= Pembroke Street =

Pembroke Street may be:

- Pembroke Street, Cambridge, England
- Pembroke Street, Oxford, England
- Pembroke Street, Dublin, Ireland

== See also ==
- Pembroke Square (disambiguation)
- Pembroke College, Cambridge
- Pembroke College, Oxford
