= Brewer Street, Oxford =

Street in central Oxford

Coordinates: 51.7497°N 1.2582°W

Brewer Street
Location of Brewer Street in central Oxford.

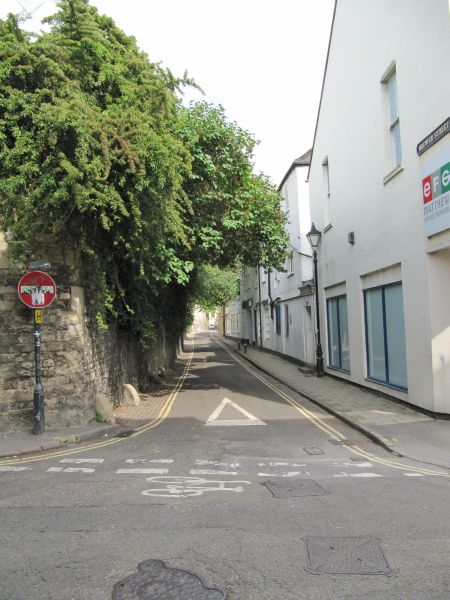
- Brewer Street with Pembroke College on the left, from St Ebbe's Street
- Interactive map of Brewer Street
- Former name(s): Sleyng Lane; Sleyne Lane; Slaying Lane; Slaughter Lane; Brewers Street
- Length: 540 ft (160 m)
- Postal code: OX1 1
- east end: A420; St Aldate's
- west end: St Ebbe's Street

Brewer Street is a historic narrow street in central Oxford, England, south of Carfax. The street runs east–west, connecting with St Aldate's to the east and St Ebbe's Street to the west.

== History ==
Originally, the area was occupied by butchers and slaughters, giving it the name Sleyng Lane (in 1478). The lane became known as Sleyne Lane (in 1690), Slaying Lane (in 1811), Slaughter Lane (in 1840). In 1772, it became Brewer Street and Lane. In 1932, the street was marked with a sign of "Brewers Street" at the St Aldate's end and "Brewer Street" at the St Ebbe's end. The latter was adopted on 14 January 1932. The current street name derives from a brewhouse in the location, dating from the 17th century.

== Institutions ==
Campion Hall, a permanent private hall of the University of Oxford, is on the south side. The hall is run by the Society of Jesus. It is the only building in Oxford designed by Sir Edwin Lutyens and was opened in 1936. The building was Grade II* listed in 2000. Rose Place is further to the south.

Christ Church Cathedral School, associated with Christ Church Cathedral and College close to the school on the other side of St Aldate's, is located at 3 Brewer Street. The school educates the choristers for the cathedral and college. The house of Cardinal Wolsey, the founder of the college, is still used for teaching.

Pembroke College, a college of the University of Oxford, is on the north side of the street, with its main entrance in Pembroke Square. Part of the old Oxford city wall is preserved in the exterior wall of Pembroke College on Brewer Street. Other parts can be found in the gardens of New College and Merton College. In 2010, Pembroke College began a major new development south of the main site, to which it is linked by a bridge over Brewer Street. The new buildings were expected to be completed in 2012.

== Famous people ==
The author Dorothy L. Sayers (1893–1957) was born at 1 Brewer Street on 13 June 1893. The house is marked with a blue plaque.

== Gallery ==
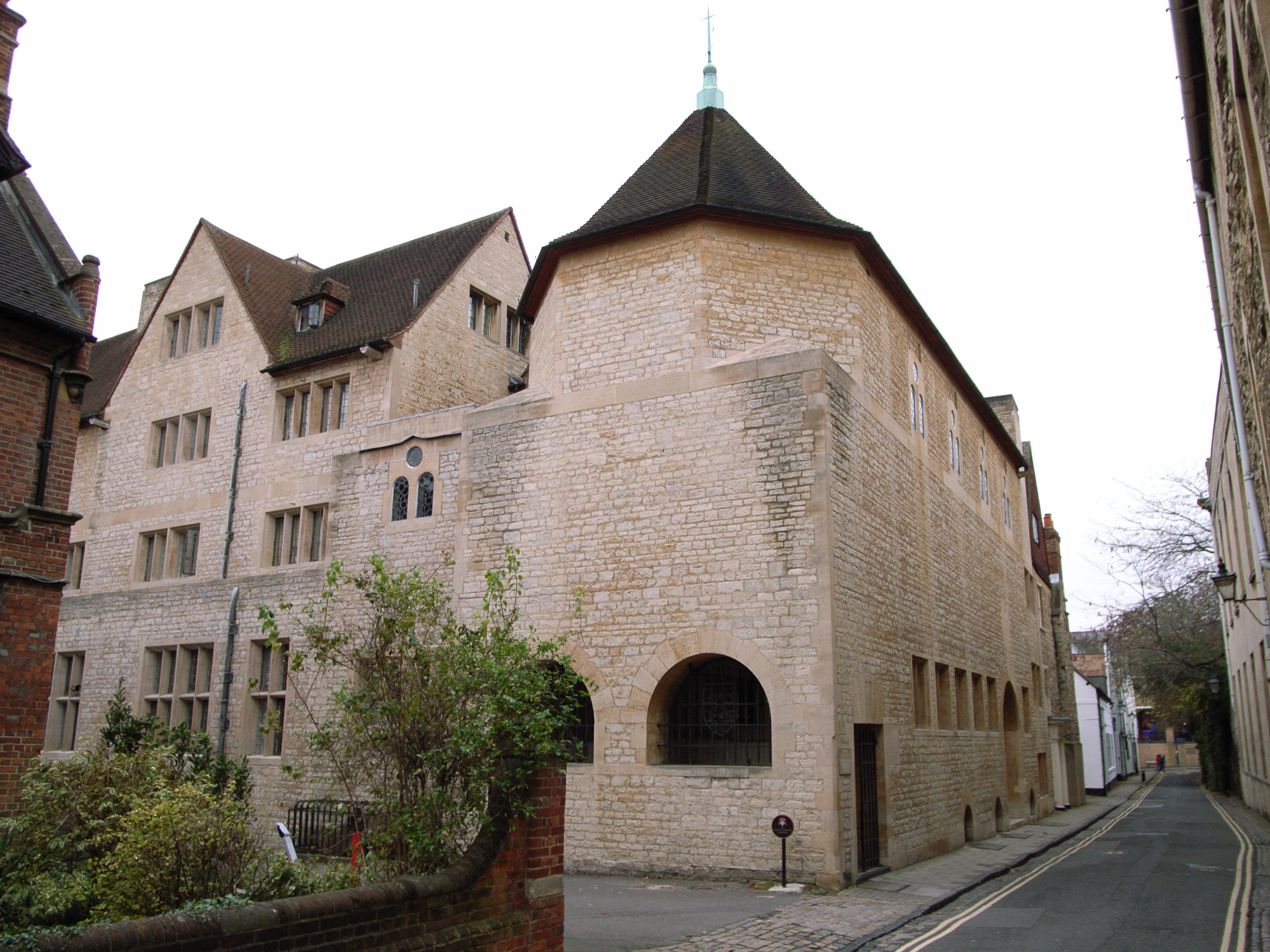
View of Campion Hall, including the chapel, on the south side of Brewer Street.

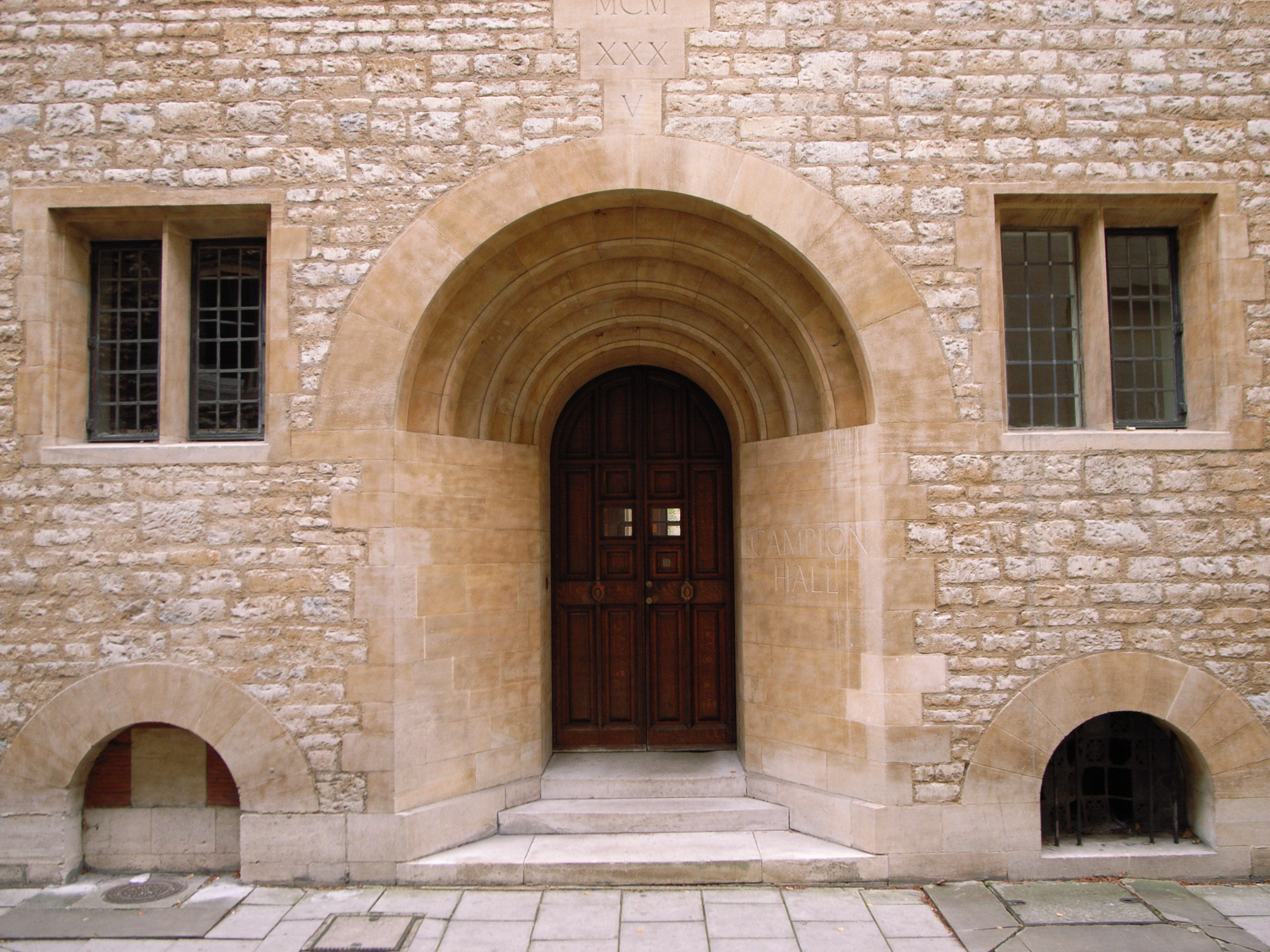
Doorway of Campion Hall on Brewer Street.

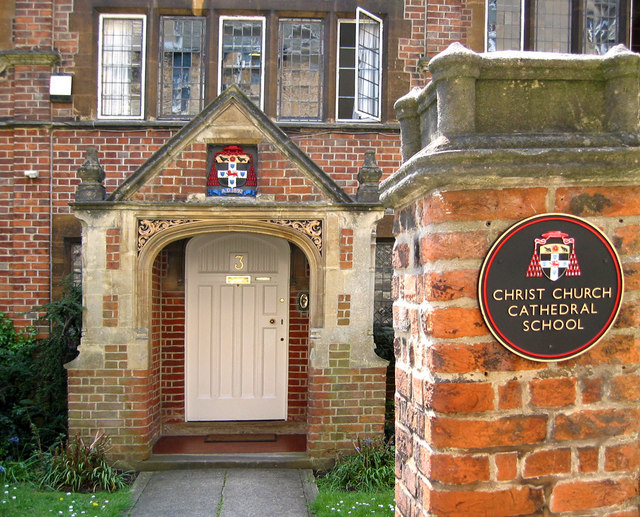
Christ Church Cathedral School at 3 Brewer Street.
