= St Aldate's, Oxford =

Street in central Oxford, England

Coordinates: 51°45′00″N 1°15′25″W

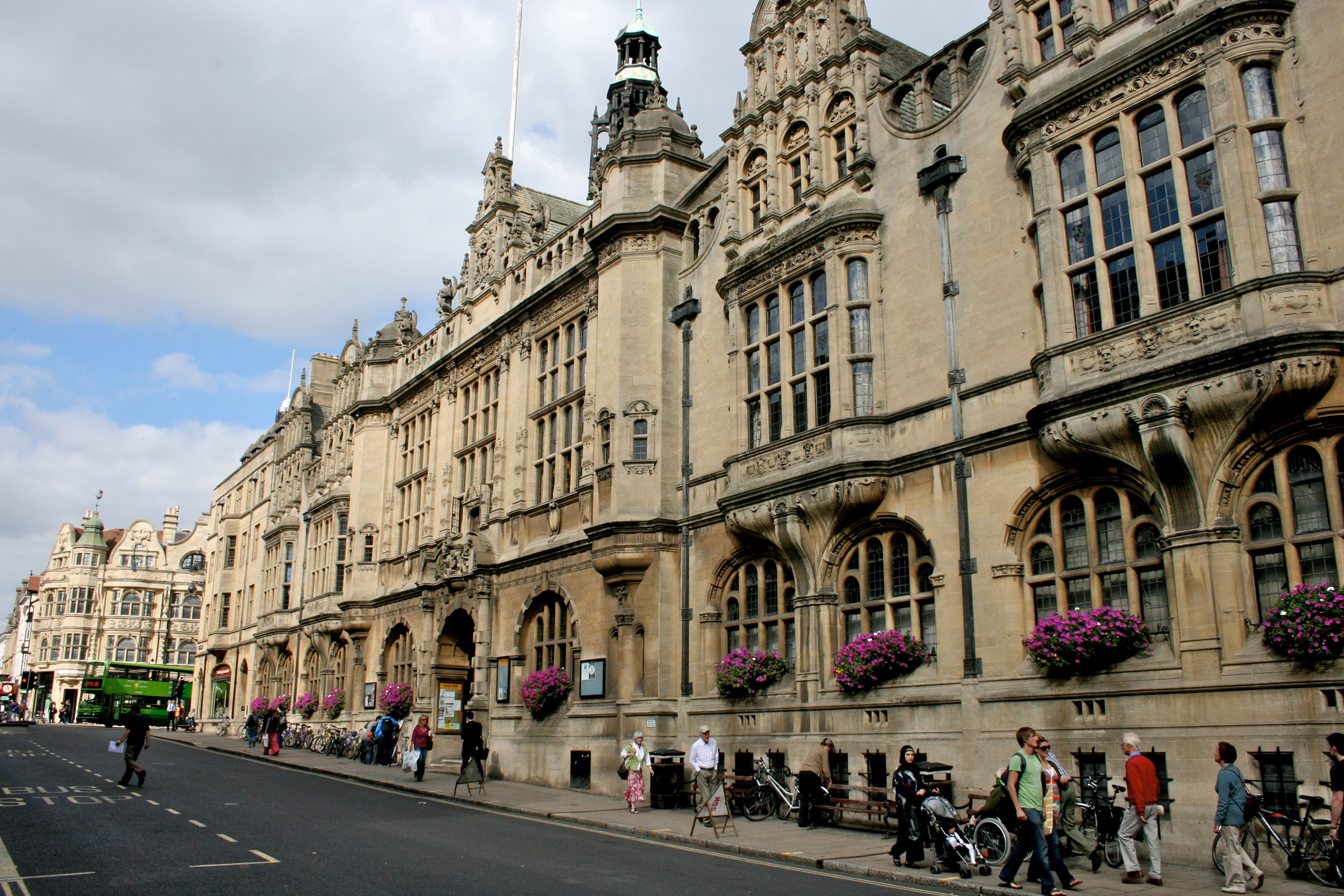
St Aldate's, looking north towards Carfax, with the Town Hall on the east side of the street

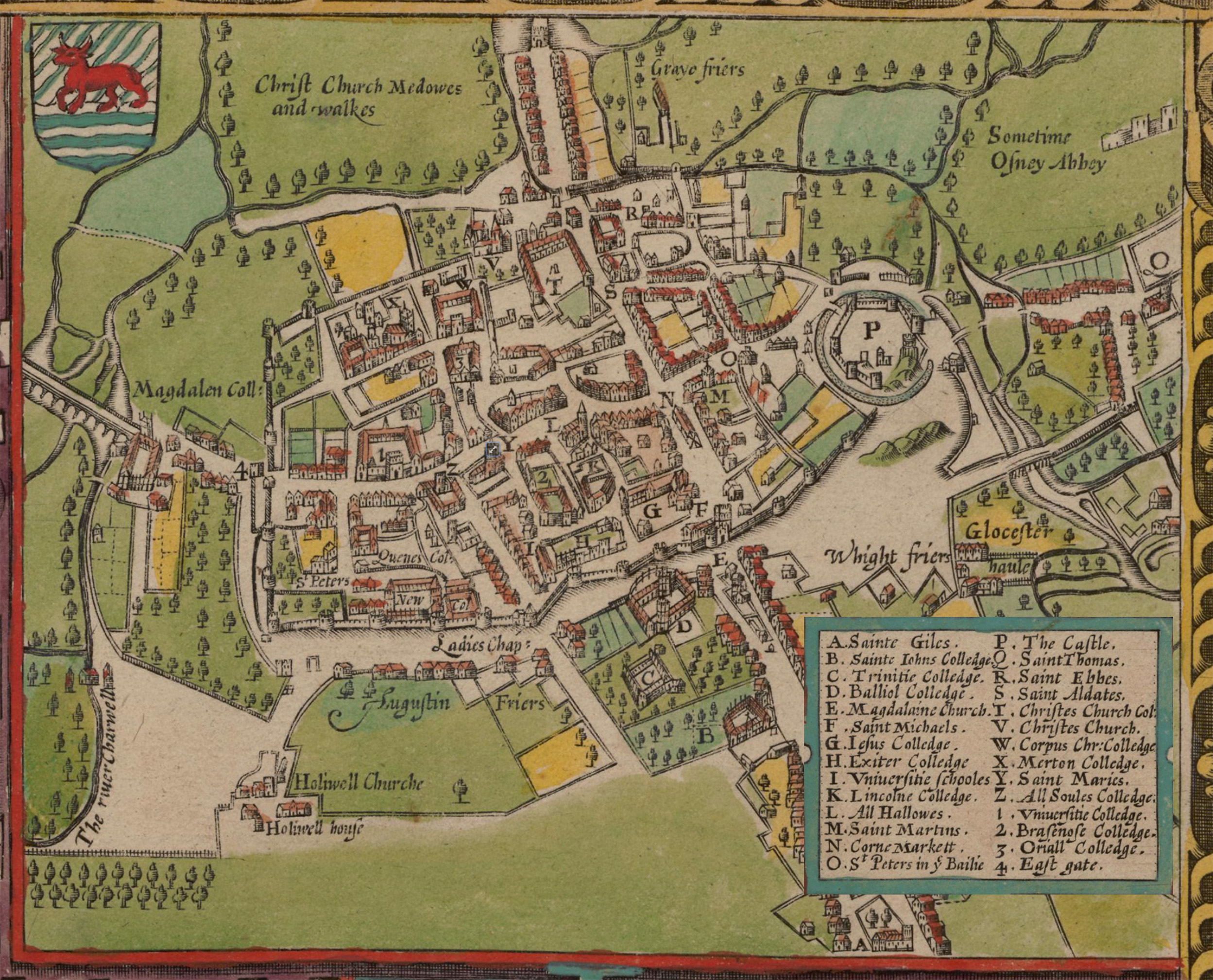
Map of Oxford by John Speed, 1605, showing city walls; south at top and "N" = Carfax

St Aldate's (/ˈɔːldeɪtz/ AWL-daytz) is a street in central Oxford, England, named after St Aldate's Church, but formerly known as Fish Street.

== Museum and Church ==
The street runs south from the generally acknowledged centre of Oxford at Carfax. The Town Hall, which includes the Museum of Oxford, is on the east side of the street. Christ Church, with its imposing Tom Tower, faces onto the east side of St Aldate's, while portions of Pembroke College (on Pembroke Square) faces its west side. Other adjoining streets include Blue Boar Street to the east side and Pembroke Street, Pembroke Square, Brewer Street, Rose Place, and Speedwell Street to the west. St Aldate's Church is on the west side of the street, in Pembroke Square.

== Alice's Shop ==
Opposite Christ Church is Alice's Shop, formerly frequented by Alice Liddell, and the model for the Sheep Shop in the "Wool and Water" chapter in Through the Looking-Glass.

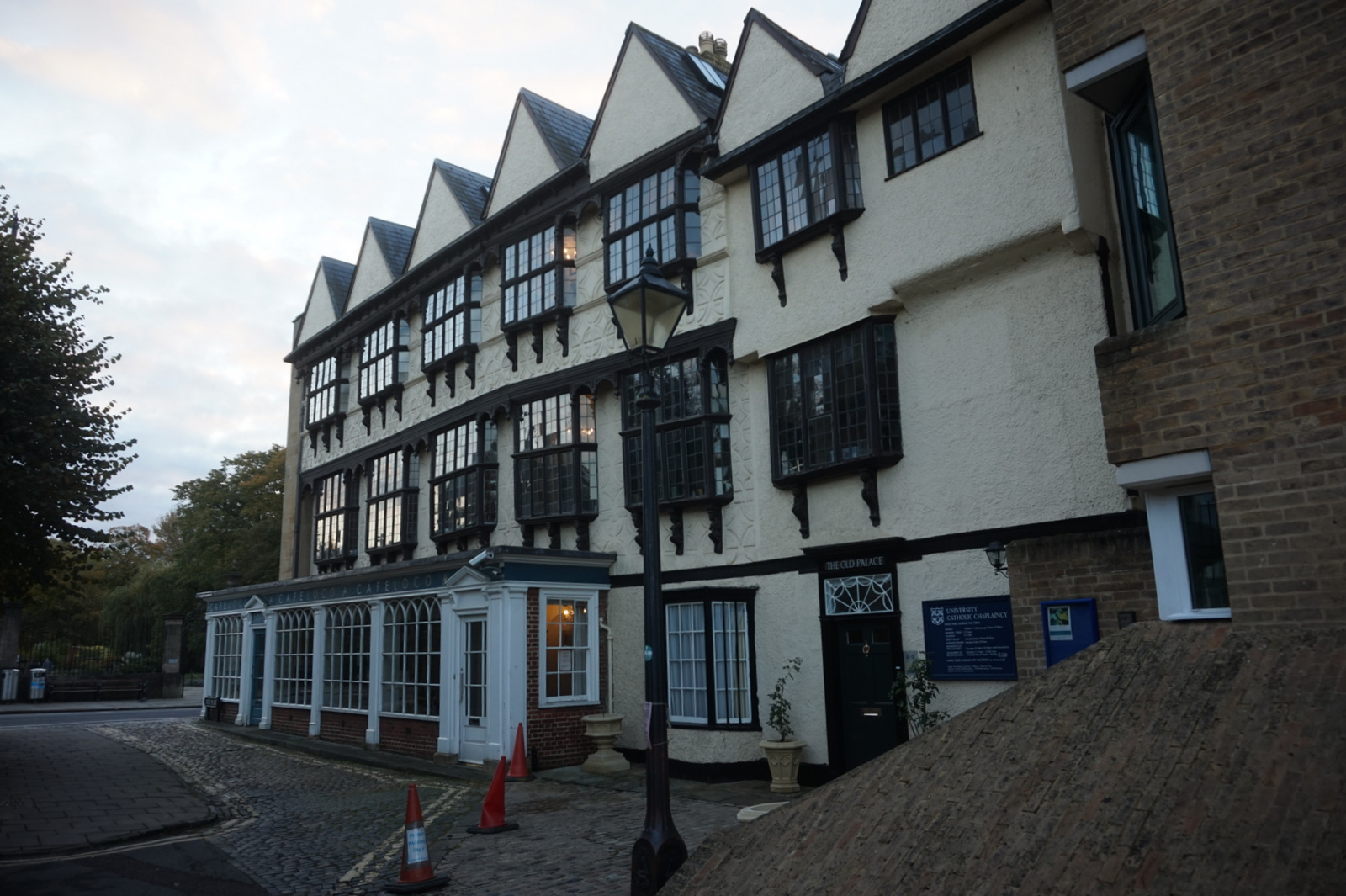
The Old Palace

== Old Palace (Bishop King's Palace) ==
The Old Palace, Nos. 86 & 87, St Aldates, is a range of buildings dating from the early 17th century, although incorporating earlier works. The main block is a three-storey timber-framed structure. Additions were made in the 19th century. It is now the headquarters for the Oxford University Catholic Chaplaincy and a Grade I listed building.

== Bate Collection of Musical Instruments ==
South of Christ Church is an entrance to Christ Church Meadow and, still on the east side, the University of Oxford's Faculty of Music, containing the Bate Collection of Musical Instruments; the building was opened in 1936 for St Catherine's Society. Oxford's police station (designed by H. F. Hurcombe, the City Estates Surveyor, and completed in 1936) and the Oxford Combined Court Centre (designed as a showroom for Morris Motors by Henry Smith and completed in 1932) opposite precede a junction with Thames Street to the west.

== Continuation into Abingdon Road ==
After Folly Bridge over the River Thames or Isis, St Aldate's enters Grandpont and becomes Abingdon Road (A4144), leading directly south out of the city of Oxford towards the Oxford Ring Road, the villages of Kennington and Radley and the town of Abingdon.

== Gallery ==
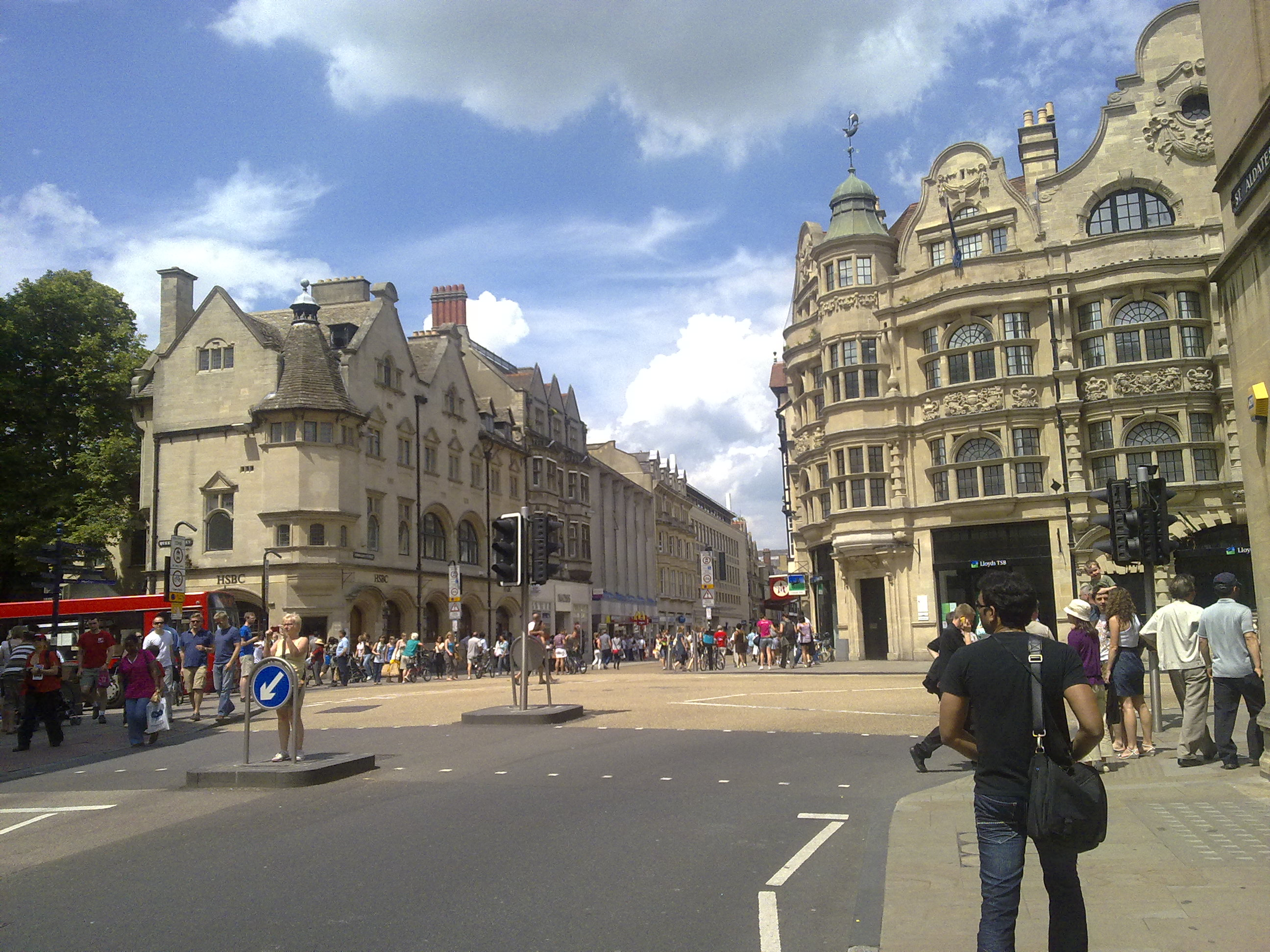
The High and Cornmarket streets intersection at the far northern end of St Aldate's.

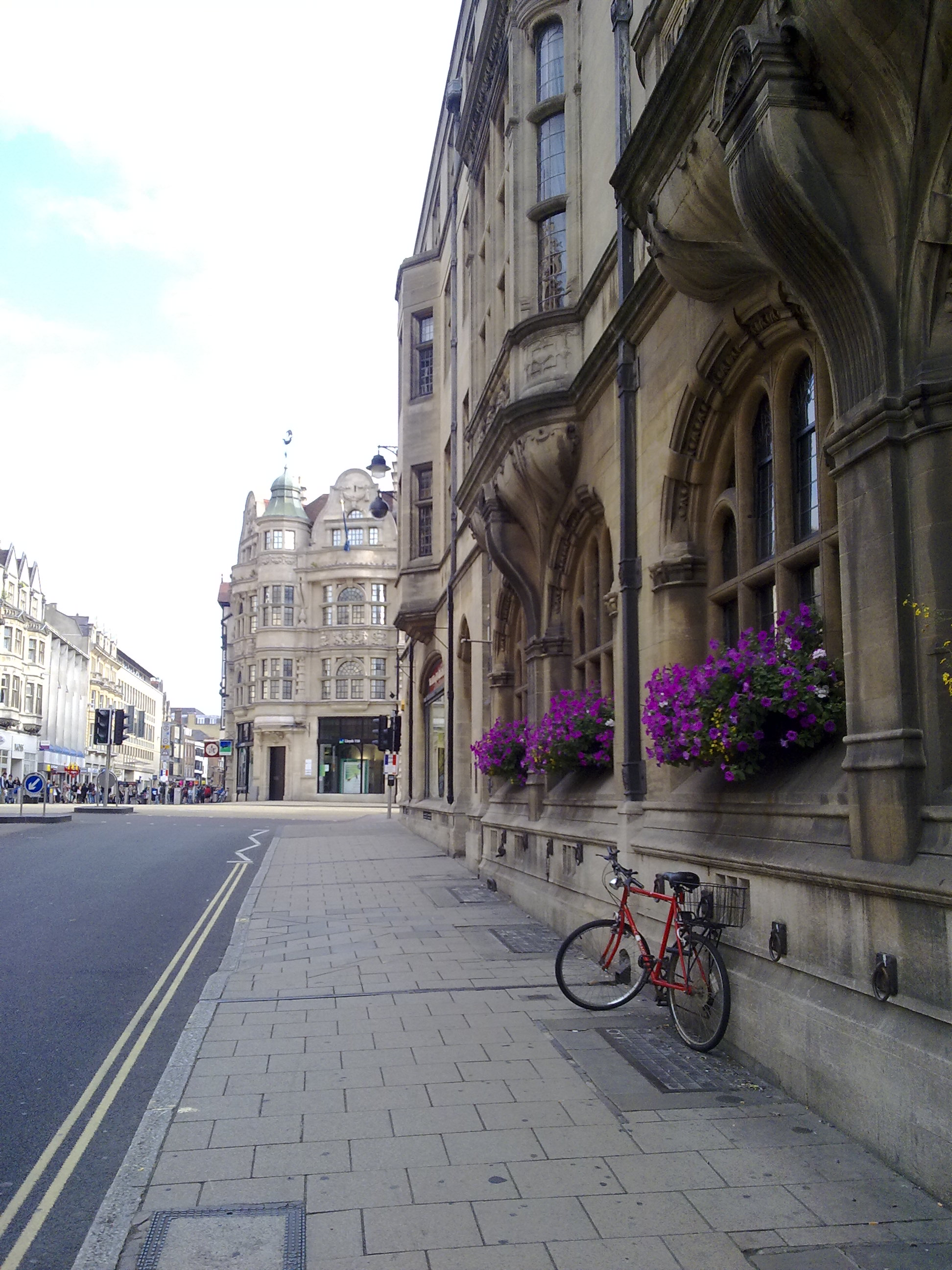
The northern end of St Aldate's.

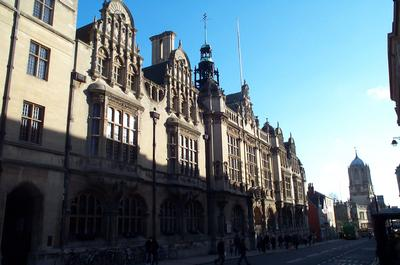
Oxford Town Hall on St Aldate's.

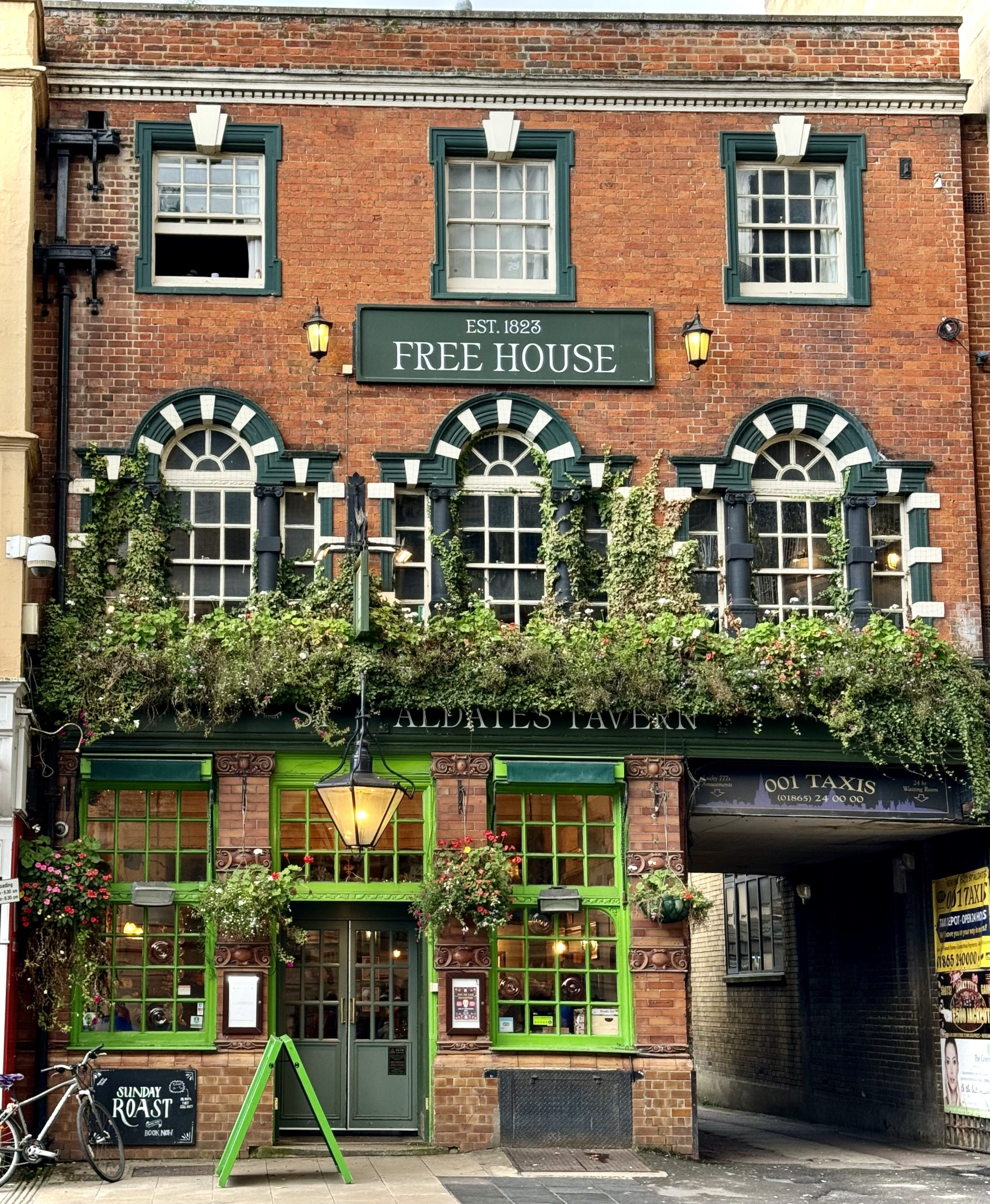
A view of St Aldate's Tavern from across the road.

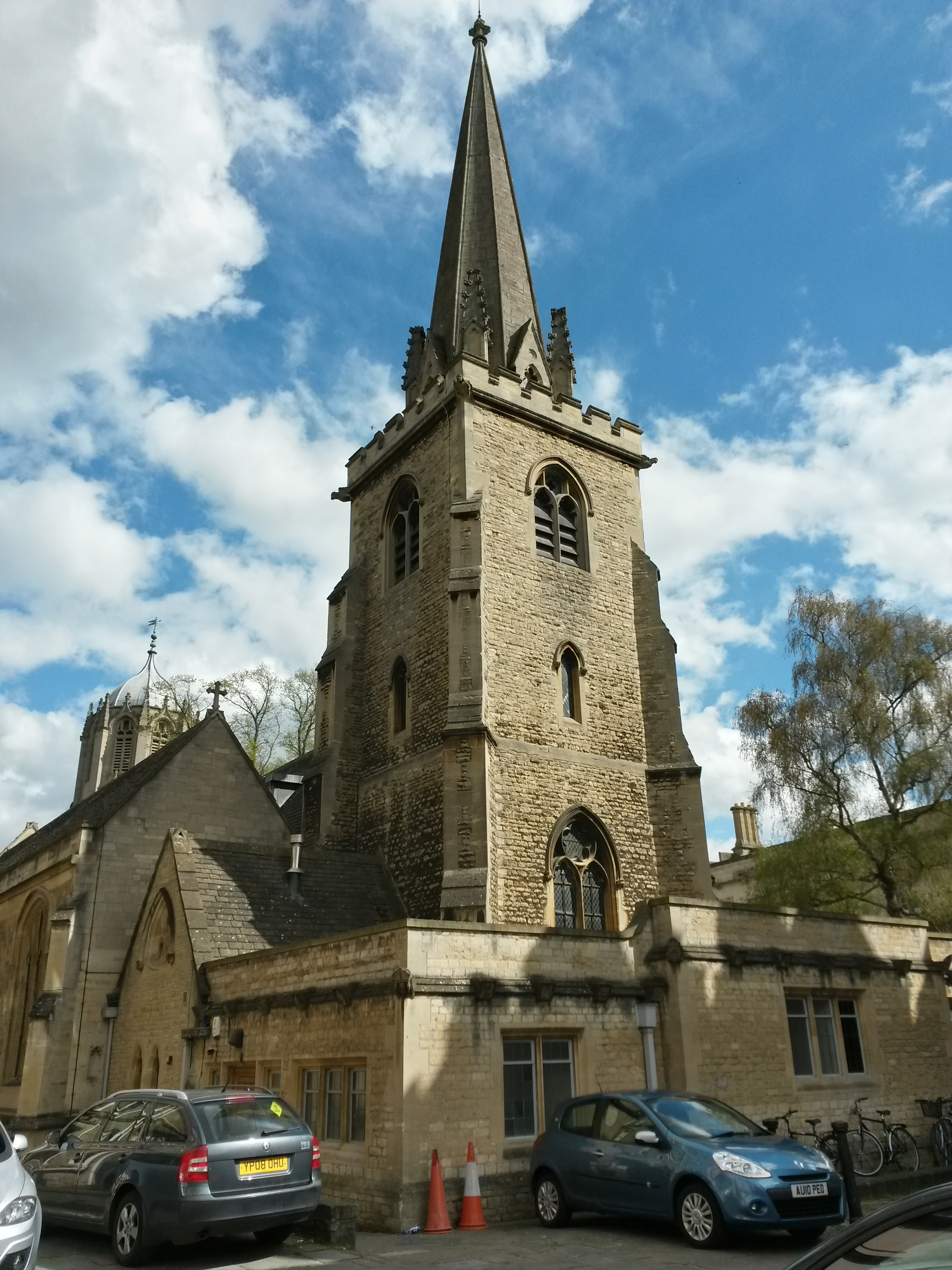
St Aldate's Church, which gives the street its name

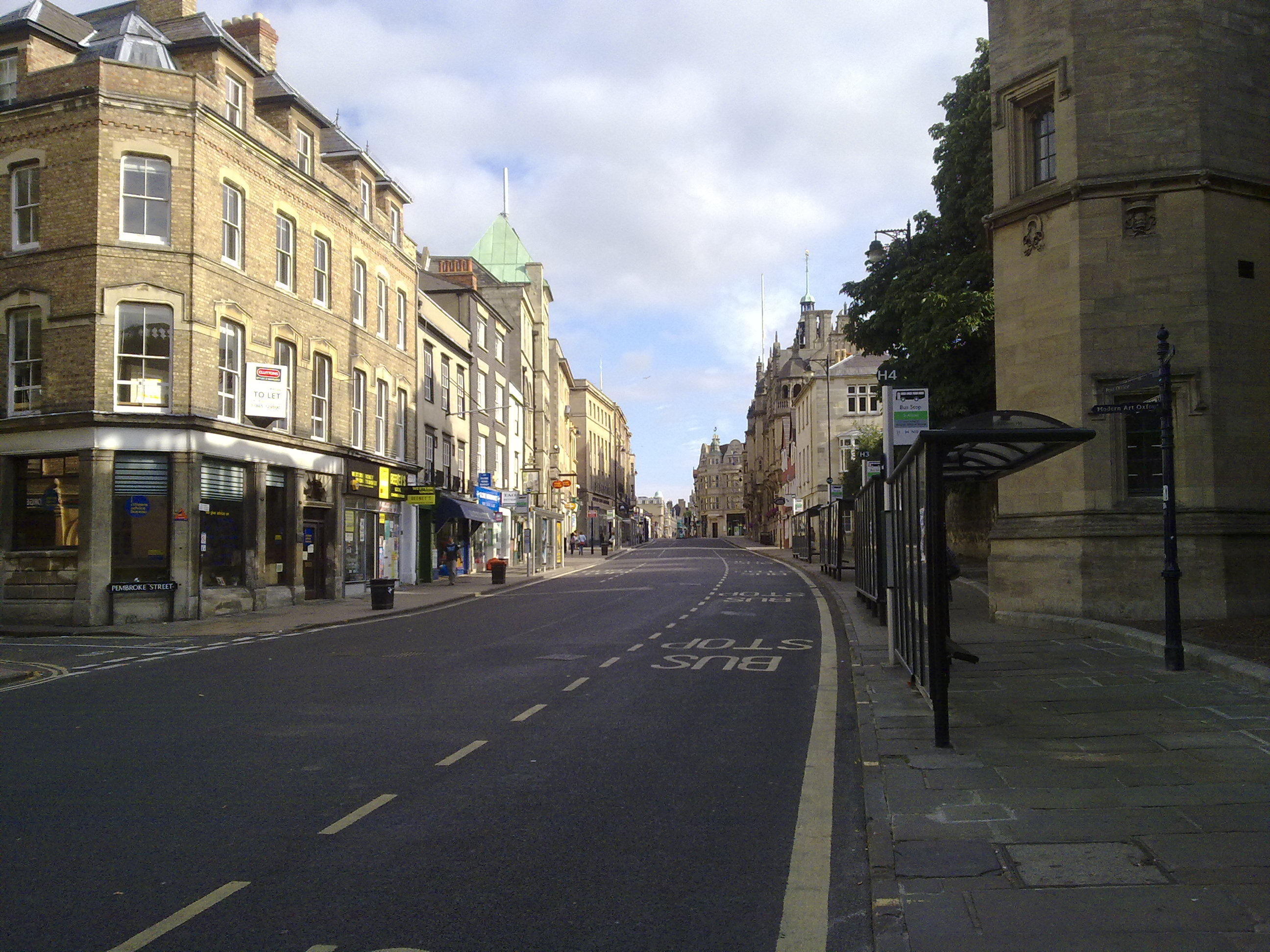
The northern section of St Aldate's Street from near the entrance to Tom Quad beneath Tom Tower.

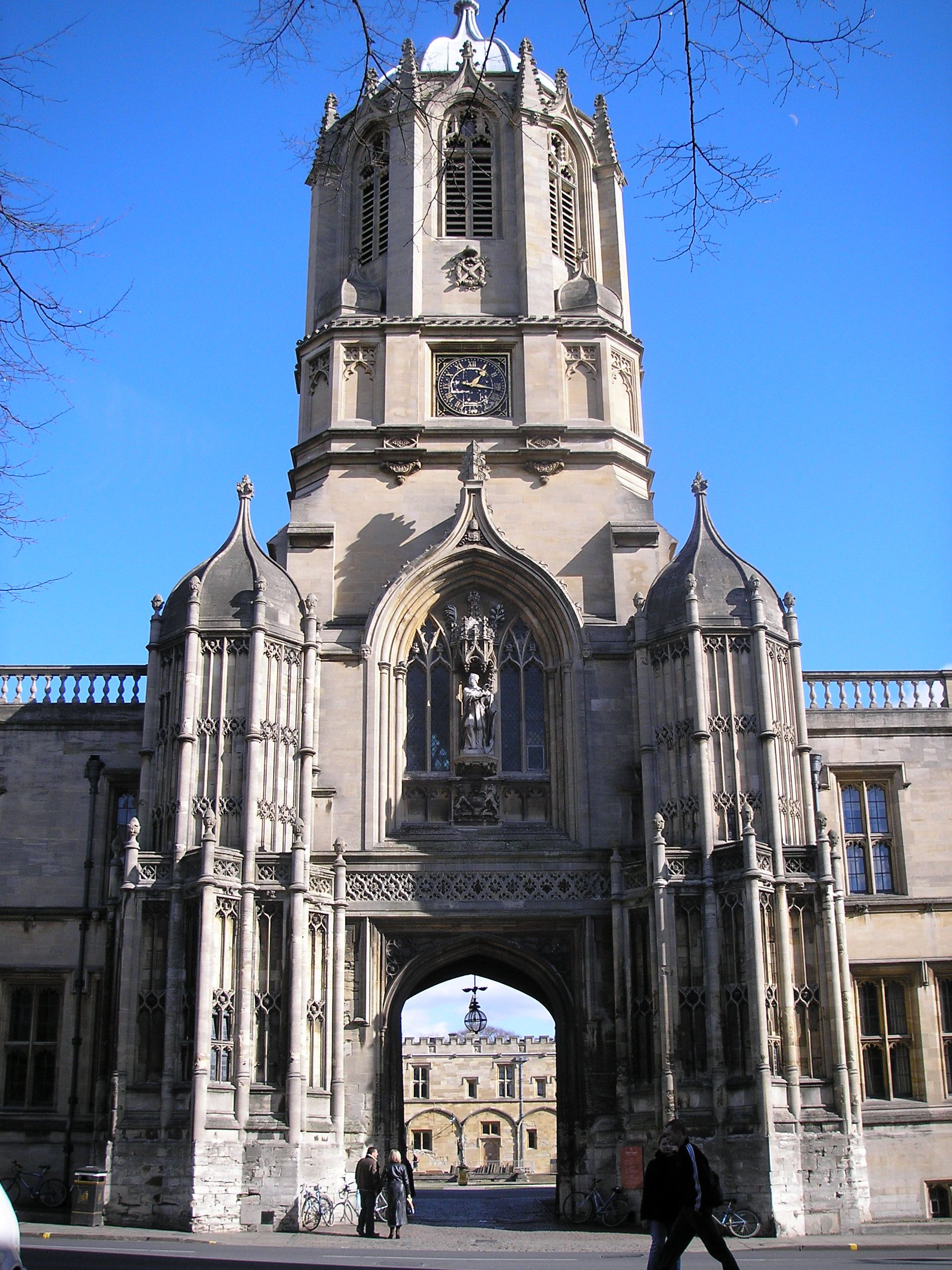
Tom Tower and the main entrance to Christ Church, the largest Oxford college, on St Aldate's.

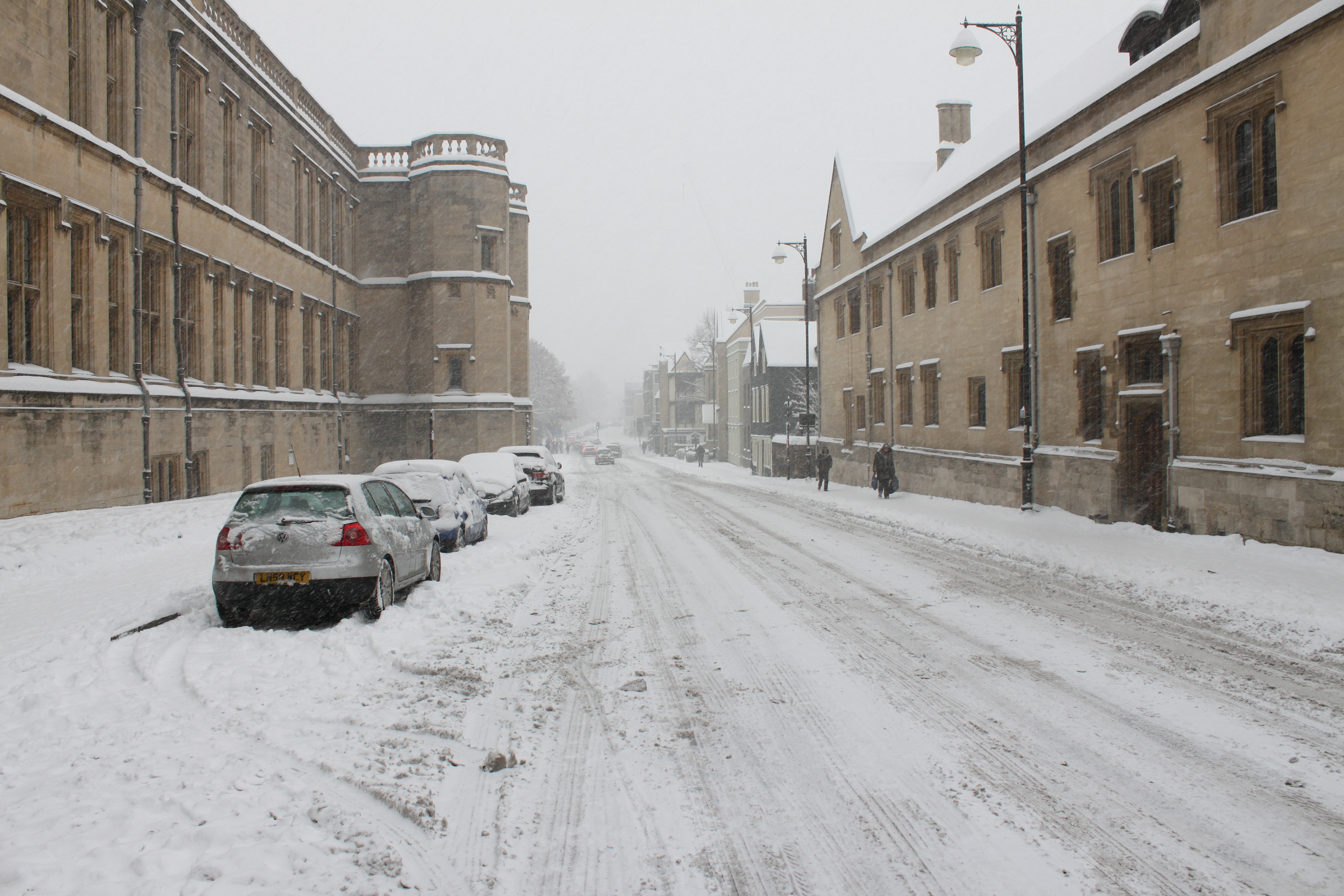
Looking south down St Aldate's in the snow, with Christ Church on the left.

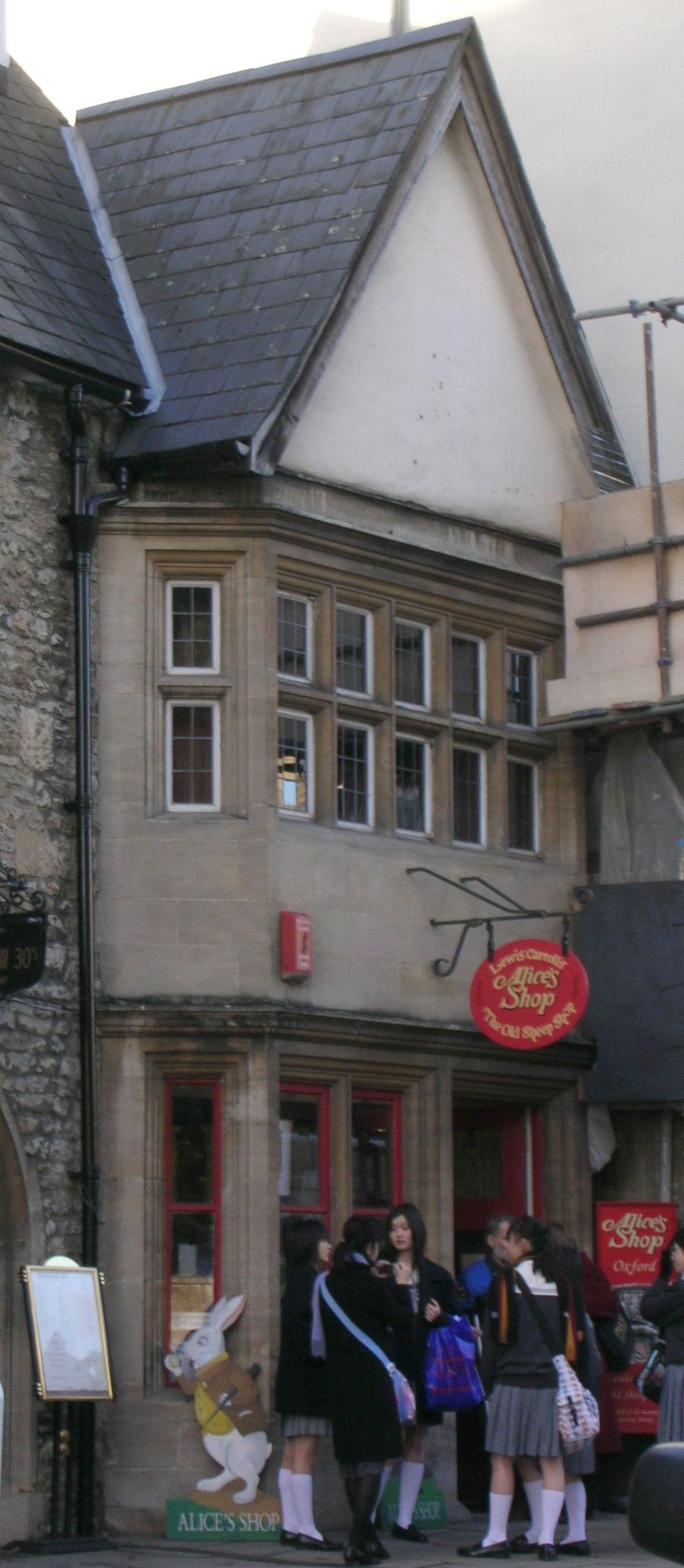
Alice's Shop on St Aldate's, opposite Christ Church.

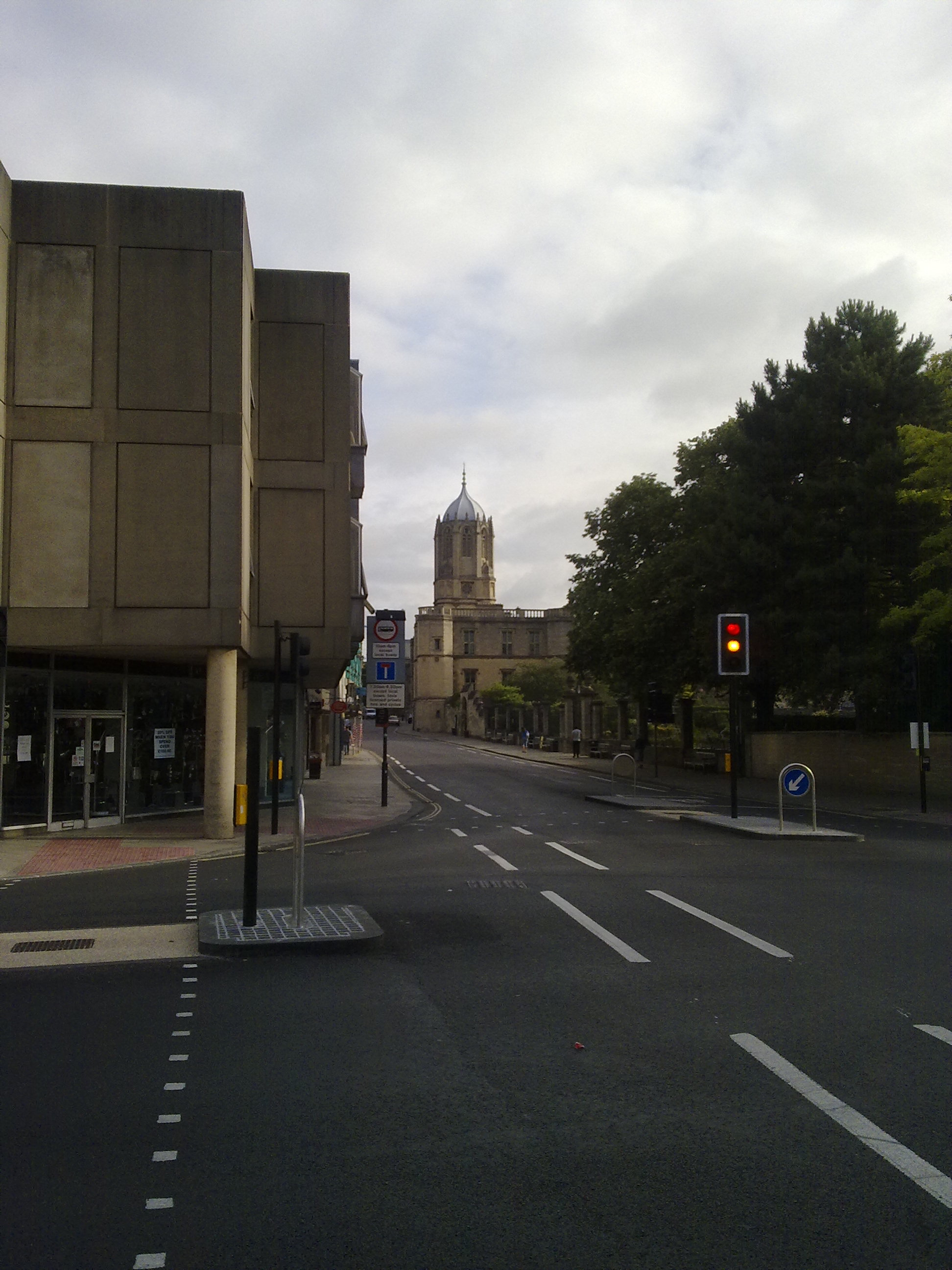
St Aldate's Street from the Speedwell Street entrance, adjacent to the Bate Collection of Musical Instruments in Christ Church Park.

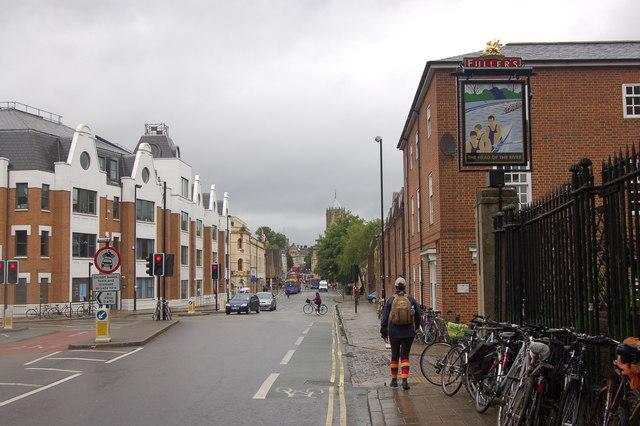
View of St Aldate's longing north from Folly Bridge with The Head of the River public house on the right.
