= Pembroke Square =

Pembroke Square may refer to:

- Pembroke Square, London, England
- Pembroke Square, Oxford, England
- Pembroke Square (Virginia), a shopping center in the United States
