= Pembroke Square, Oxford =

Square in central Oxford, England

Coordinates: 51°45′01″N 1°15′27″W

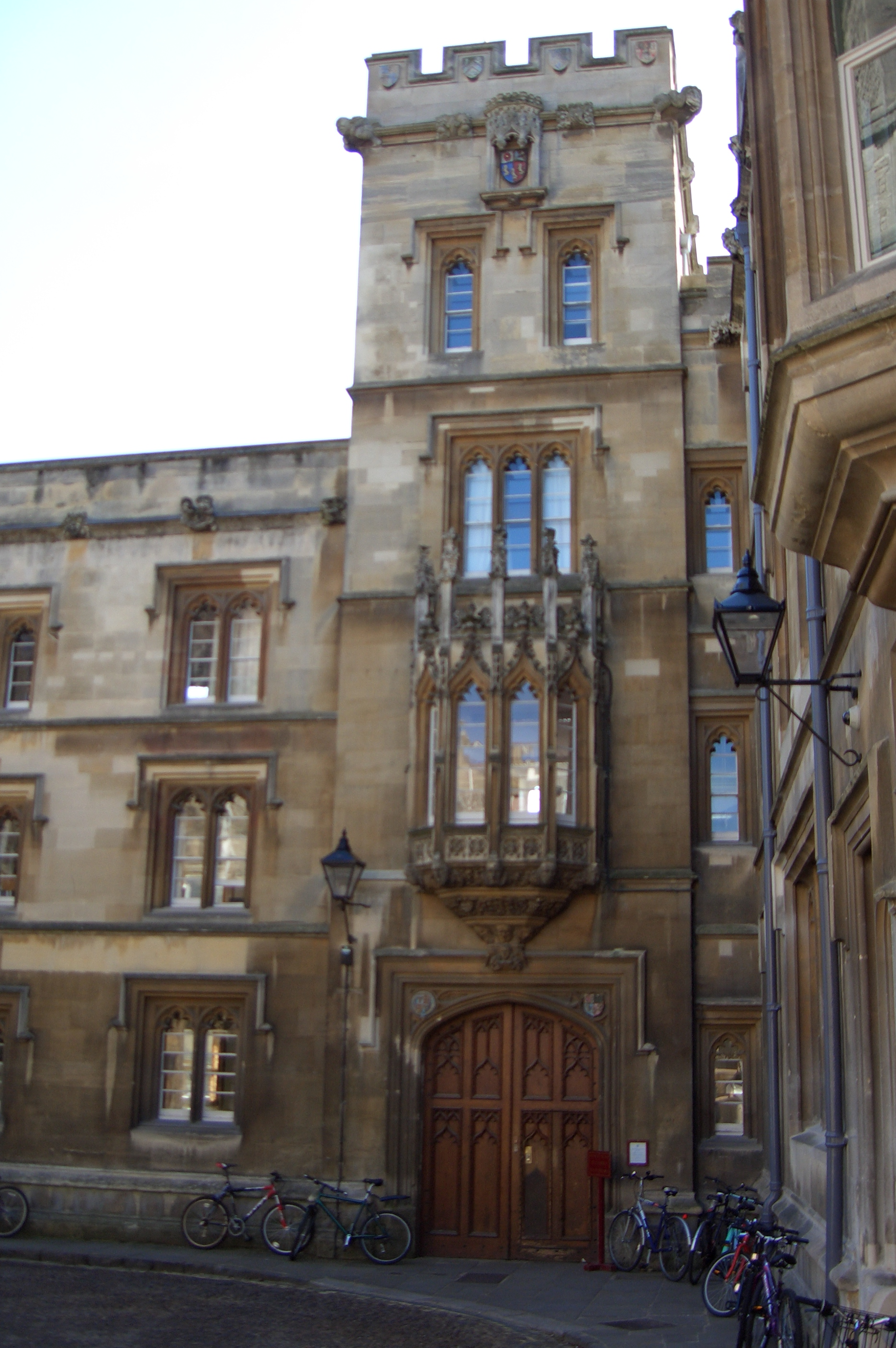
The lodge and the entrance to Pembroke College in Pembroke Square. Samuel Johnson had rooms as an undergraduate from 1728 on the second floor above the entrance.

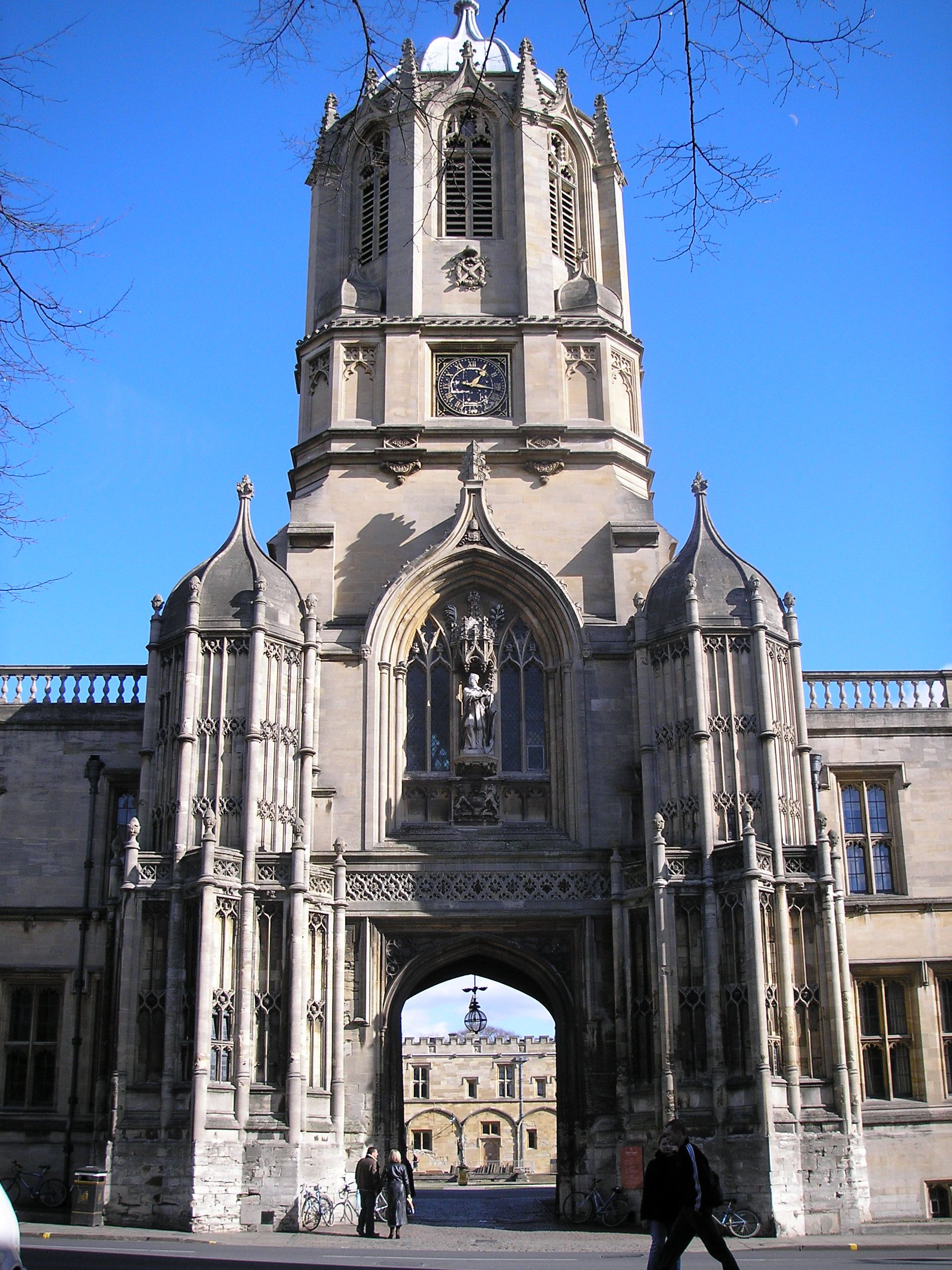
View of the main entrance of Christ Church, Oxford with Tom Tower above from Pembroke Square.

Pembroke Square is a square in central Oxford, England, located to the west of St Aldate's and directly adjoining it.

The square is named for Pembroke College, which has its main entrance at the south-west corner of the square, and houses St Aldate's Church which was formerly the library of the college. The square is also opposite the main entrance to Christ Church, the largest Oxford college, with Tom Tower above it to the east.

Nos 13–14, were built in 1641, consisting of four floors, using rubble construction with a timber frame above. Nos 17–18 are Jacobean and nos 36–37 are Georgian in style.

To the west at the north of the square is Beef Lane, although the road has now been incorporated within the walls of Pembroke College and converted into its "North Quad". Samuel Johnson, a student of Pembroke; and J. R. R. Tolkien, a fellow at Pembroke, previously had rooms overlooking the square.
