= Pembroke College, Oxford =

College of the University of Oxford

Pembroke College
- University of Oxford
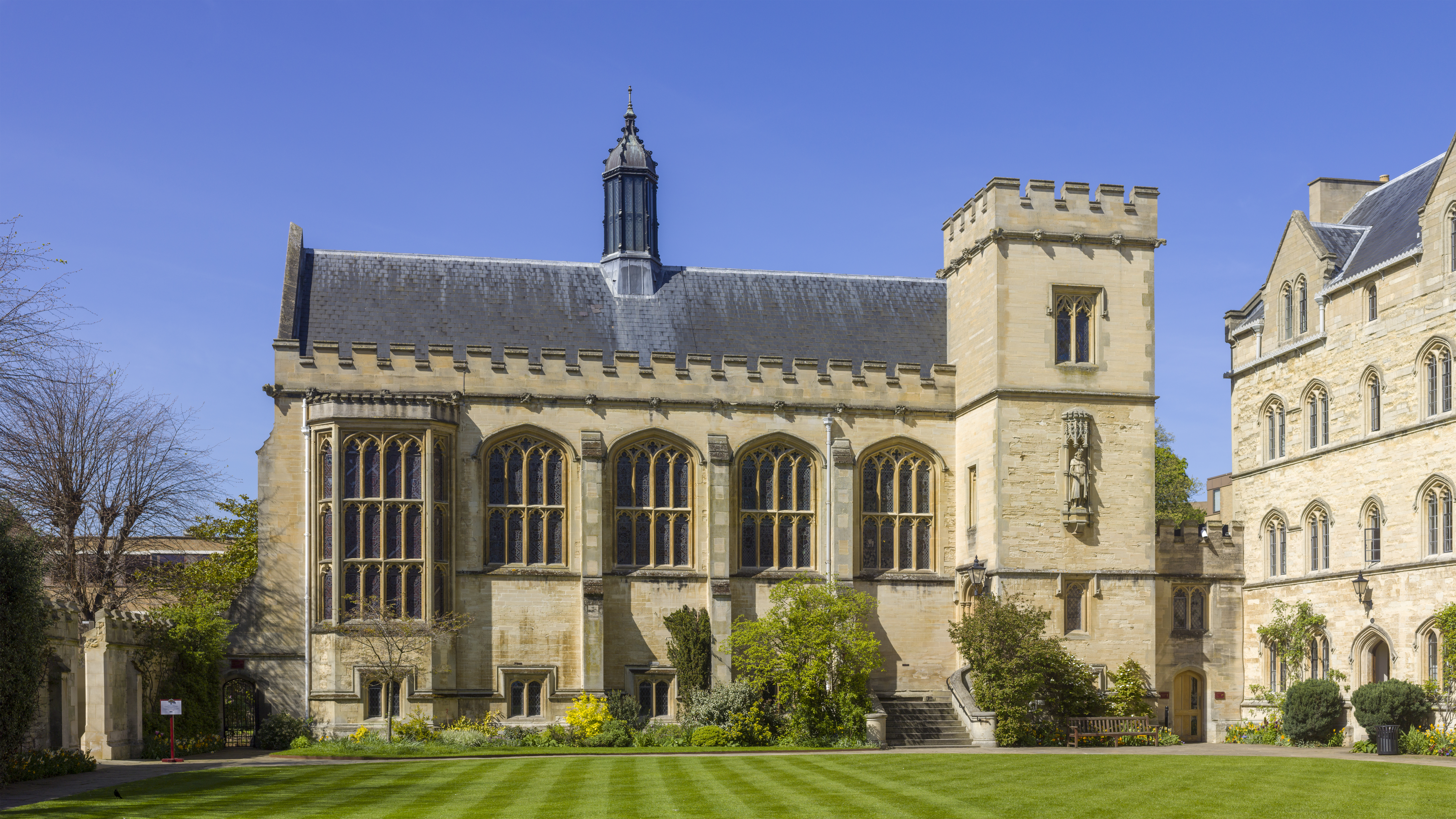
- Pembroke College Hall over the Chapel Quad

- Arms: see below
- Location: Pembroke Square, Oxford OX1 1DW
- Coordinates: 51.750062°N 1.257827°W
- Latin name: Collegium Pembrochiae, Collegium Pembrochianum
- Established: 1624; 402 years ago
- Named for: William Herbert, 3rd Earl of Pembroke
- Sister college: Queens' College, Cambridge
- Master: Sir Ernest Ryder
- Undergraduates: 390 (2024/2025)
- Postgraduates: 245 (2024/2025)
- Endowment: £58.9 million (2020)
- Website: www.pmb.ox.ac.uk
- Boat club: Pembroke College Boat Club

Map
- Location within Oxford city centre

Pembroke College, a constituent college of the University of Oxford, is located on Pembroke Square, Oxford. The college was founded in 1624 by King James I of England and VI of Scotland, using in part the endowment of merchant Thomas Tesdale, and was named after William Herbert, 3rd Earl of Pembroke, Lord Chamberlain and then-Chancellor of the University.

Like many Oxford colleges, Pembroke previously accepted men only, admitting its first mixed-sex cohort in 1979. As of 2020, Pembroke had an estimated financial endowment of £58.9 million. Pembroke College provides almost the full range of study available at Oxford University.

A former Senior President of Tribunals and Lord Justice of Appeal, Sir Ernest Ryder, has held the post of Master of Pembroke since 2020.

== History ==
=== Foundation and origins ===
In 1610, Thomas Tesdale gave £5,000 on his death for the education of Abingdon School Scholars (seven fellows and six scholars) at Balliol College, Oxford. However, in 1623, this money was augmented by the Reverend Richard Wightwick, parish priest of East Ilsley, and used instead for the conversion of Broadgates Hall into Pembroke College. Broadgates Hall had been an academic hall for law students. The site of the hall was given to the Priory of St Frideswide by a Richard Segrim in 1254. The letters patent founding the college were signed by King James I in 1624, it being named after William Herbert, 3rd Earl of Pembroke, Lord Chamberlain, Chancellor of the University, and rumoured patron of William Shakespeare.

=== Coat of arms ===
Pembroke College's arms were granted on 14 February 1625, being blazoned by the Heralds' College:

"Per pale azure and gules, three lions rampant two and one argent, in a chief party per pale argent and or, in the first a rose gules seeded or barbed vert, in the second a thistle proper".

King James I and the Earl of Pembroke are both represented in the College's arms: the former by the union of the crowns as James I of England and James VI of Scotland, depicted by the rose (of England) and the thistle (of Scotland); the latter using the three lions rampant and colours from the Pembroke family arms.

== Buildings ==
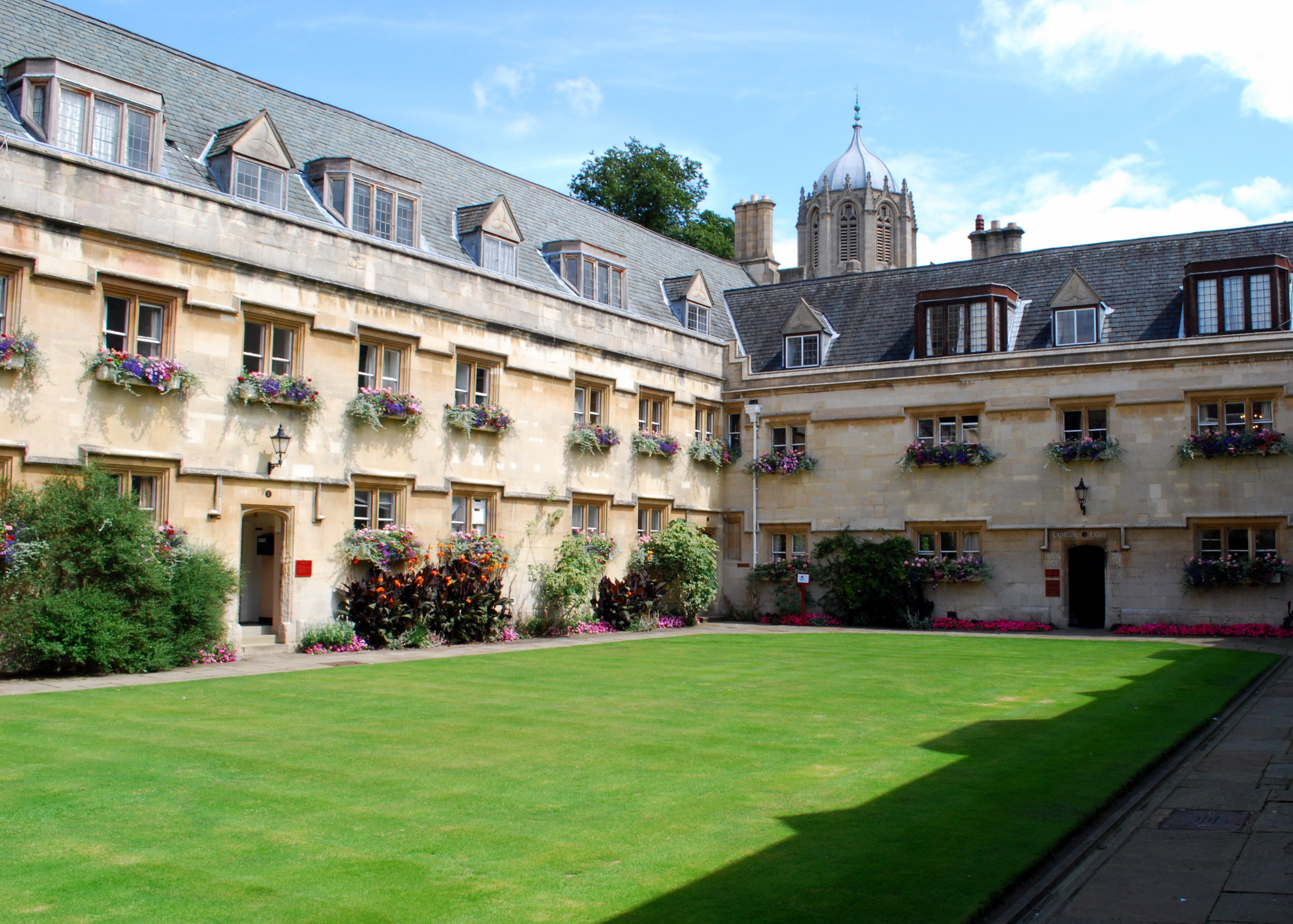
Old Quad, with Tom Tower in the distance

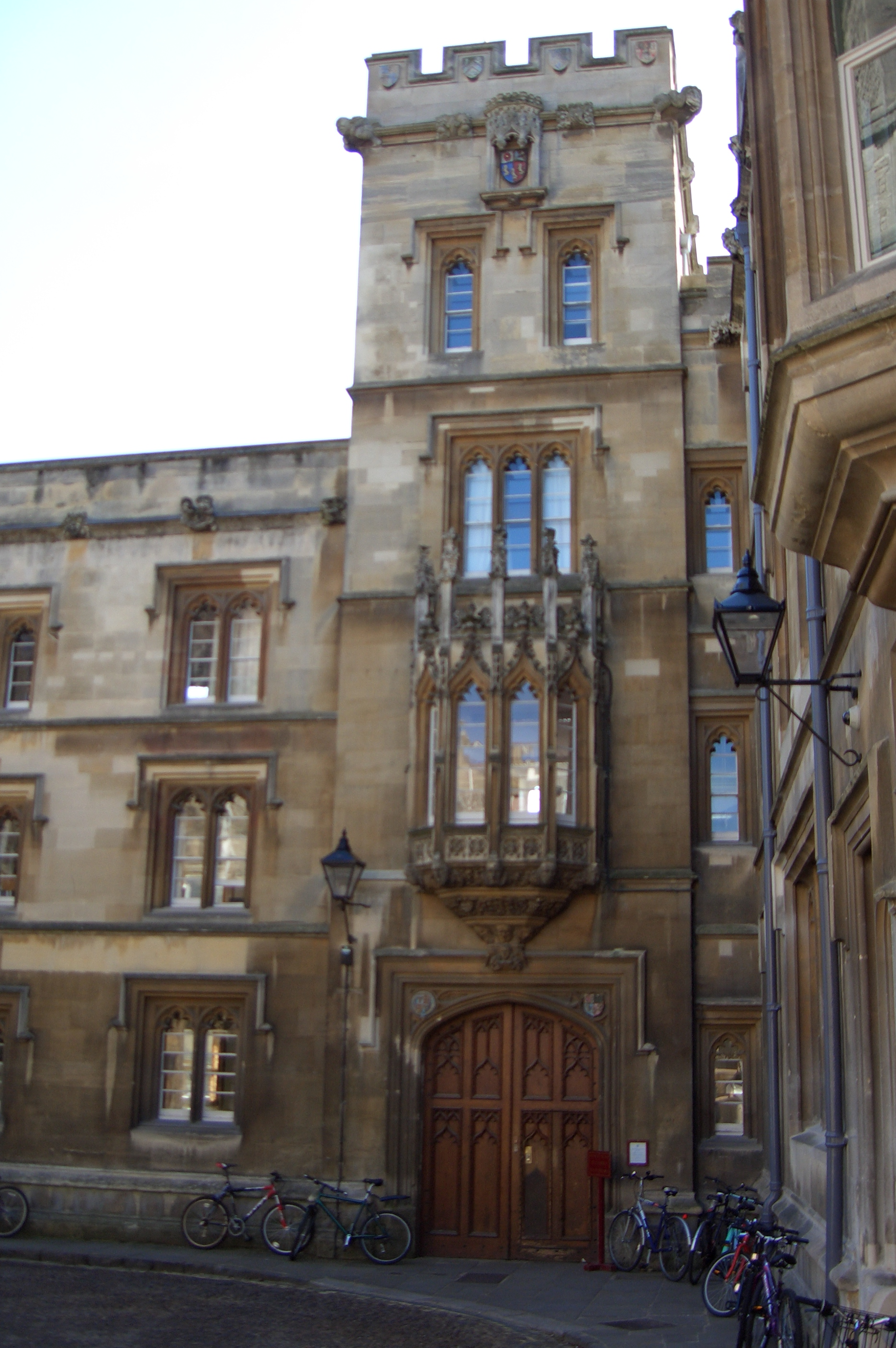
College entrance from Pembroke Square, above which Samuel Johnson, as an undergraduate (1728), had rooms on the second floor.

=== Old Quad ===
Following its foundation, the college proceeded to expand around Broadgates, building what is now known as "Old Quad" in the 1600s. Built in stages through the seventeenth century out of the local Cotswold limestone, space restrictions saw the south-side of the Quad built directly on top of the old Oxford city wall.

=== Chapel Quad ===
A Chapel was built in 1732, followed by the introduction of further accommodation in 1846 and the Hall in 1848 to designs by Exeter-based architect John Hayward, together creating "Chapel Quad". The Chapel was designed and built by William Townsend, although the interior was dramatically revamped by Charles Kempe—a Pembroke graduate—in 1884. Pembroke alumnus Dr. Damon Wells was a significant benefactor of the college over many years: he funded the restoration of the Chapel in 1972 and again in the 1990s and provided ongoing support to the Chaplaincy and History Fellowship. The Chapel, which is still used for regular worship, now bears his name.

=== North Quad ===
Further expansion of the College came in the 1960s, after the closure of Beef Lane to the north of Chapel Quad. The private houses north of the closed road were acquired by the college in a piecemeal fashion and reversed so that access was only possible from the rear. The area is now known as "North Quad" and was formally opened in 1962.

=== Rokos Quad ===
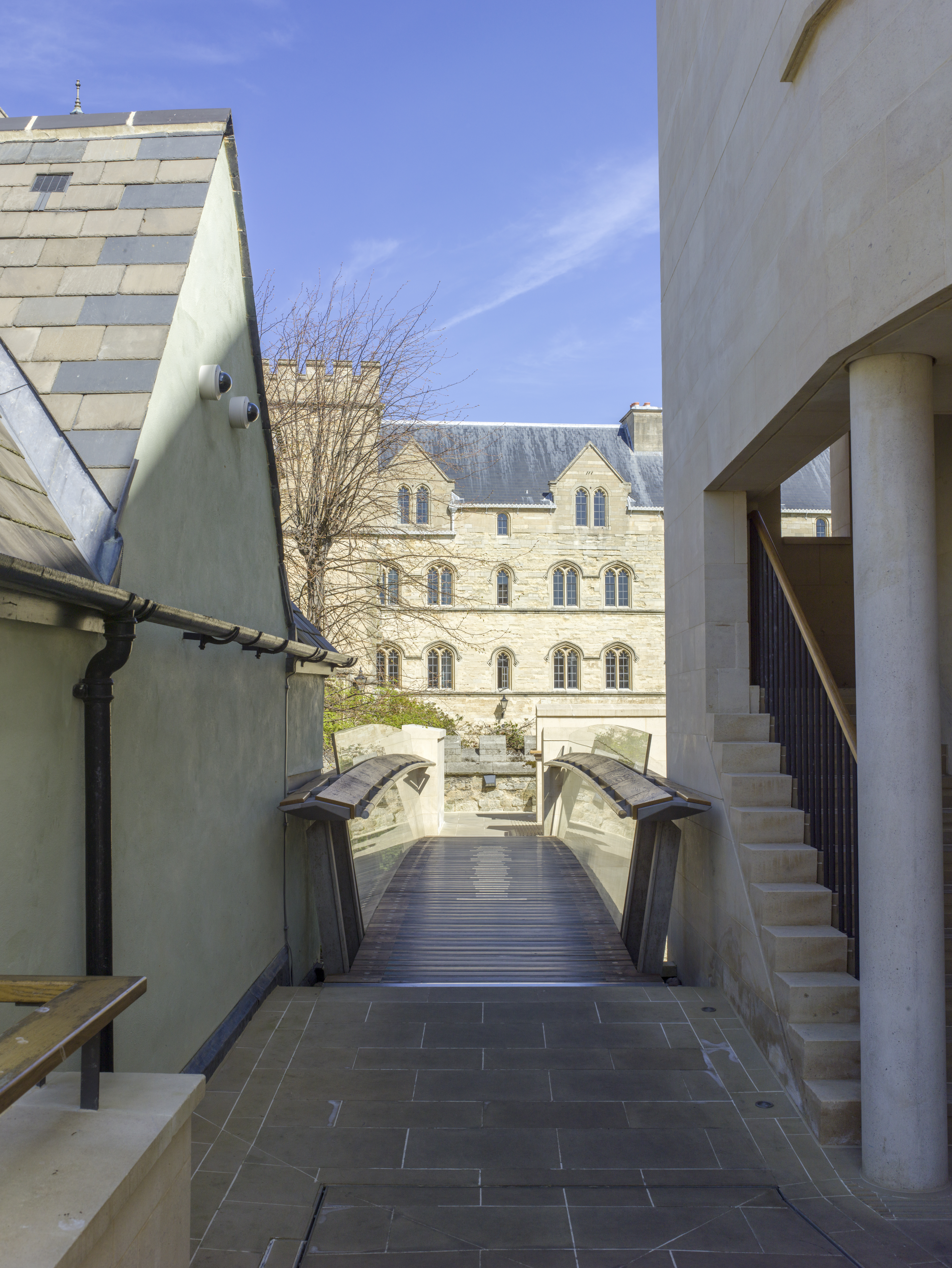
The bridge connecting Pembroke's new quadrangle with the Chapel Quad

In April 2013, Prince Edward, Duke of Kent officially opened a new quadrangle named after the lead donor Chris Rokos The new buildings include a 170-seat multi-purpose auditorium, a new café, art gallery, and teaching and function rooms. The development is physically joined to the college's existing city-centre site via a new bridge crossing Brewer Street and the original medieval city wall, and 'landing' in the old Fellows' Garden adjacent to Chapel Quad. Having historically been one of the university's dimensionally smaller colleges, following the opening of the new building, undergraduates are now able to live in college premises for all years of study. Postgraduates also benefit from more rooms, and there are six flats for those with partners.

=== Geoffrey Arthur Building ===
A modern annexe on the banks of the River Isis at Grandpont provides accommodation for around 115 graduates and 40 undergraduates of the college. Named the Geoffrey Arthur Building (commonly referred to as "The GAB"), the building is named after the diplomat Sir Geoffrey Arthur, Master of the College (1975–1985).

== Admissions ==
Pembroke offers a broad range of courses, covering most subject areas offered by the university having a strong involvement with Economics, Languages, as well as Management Studies, being the first traditional Oxford college to elect a Fellow in the field. The college maintains a relationship with the Saïd Business School.

In March 2002, two Pembroke fellows resigned after allegations that they had offered a place to the fictional child of an undercover reporter in return for a donation to the college library; a journalist had taped a conversation in which he posed as the father of a fictitious son.

Pembroke leads an educational Access initiative called OxNet, delivered in collaboration with other Oxford colleges and Higher Education institutions in addition to a national network of Hub and Link schools across West London, the North West and North East of England. OxNet runs a series of academic programmes for pupils from these target regions, aiming to raise educational aspiration and attainment and to widen access to the University of Oxford and other competitive universities, irrespective of a person's background of location. Their programmes aim to challenge pupils to think beyond the curriculum, raise academic resilience and confidence, demystify preconceptions of Oxbridge and equip pupils with important skills for continued study.

== Student life ==
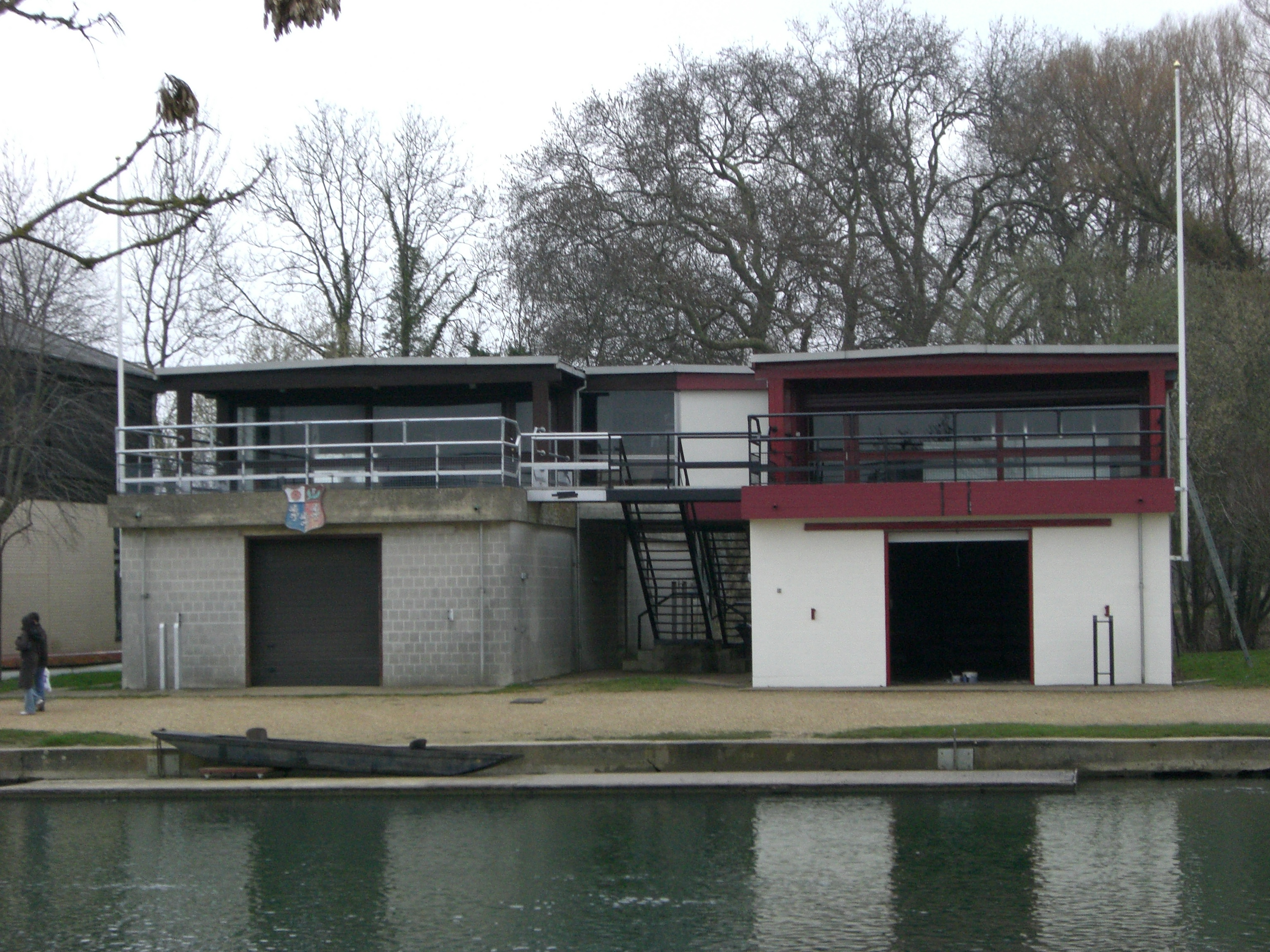
Pembroke College Boathouse on the Isis (left, adjacent to St Edmund Hall Boathouse)

=== Junior and Middle Common Rooms ===
Pembroke is home to a Junior Common Room (undergraduate community) notable for its artistic wealth and sporting prowess. The JCR is the wealthiest in Oxford due to the purchase and sale of a Francis Bacon painting in the mid 20th century; it was bought in 1953 for £150 and sold for £400,000 in 1997. The JCR has used those funds to support a student support scheme and an artistic acquisition programme.

=== Sport ===
In 2018, Pembroke became the first college to win two rugby honours in one year, with the women's team winning Cuppers, and the men's team winning the Cuppers Bowl.

Pembroke College Boat Club in 2013 held both the Torpids and Summer Eights men's headship, with the women's 1st boat sitting at 4th and 7th places respectively. In 2016, the men held Head of the River in Torpids and 4th in Summer Eights, and the women held 3rd and 2nd for Torpids and Summer Eights respectively. Pembroke Men's 2nd Torpids also bumped five places up to 11th in Division 1—the first time there have been two men's boats from a single college in over 40 years. Pembroke was the top club in aggregate points across all boats for three years running. In 2003, Pembroke became the first college to win the "Double Headship Trophy" for having both men's and women's Eights head the river. In 2018, the Pembroke Women's 1st boat again achieved the Summer Eights headship and in 2025 it became the first Women's boat in college's history to achieve Torpids headship, as the Women's 1st boat held both the Torpids and Summer Eights headship.

== People associated with Pembroke ==
=== Notable people ===
Richard Wightwick, original benefactor of Pembroke College

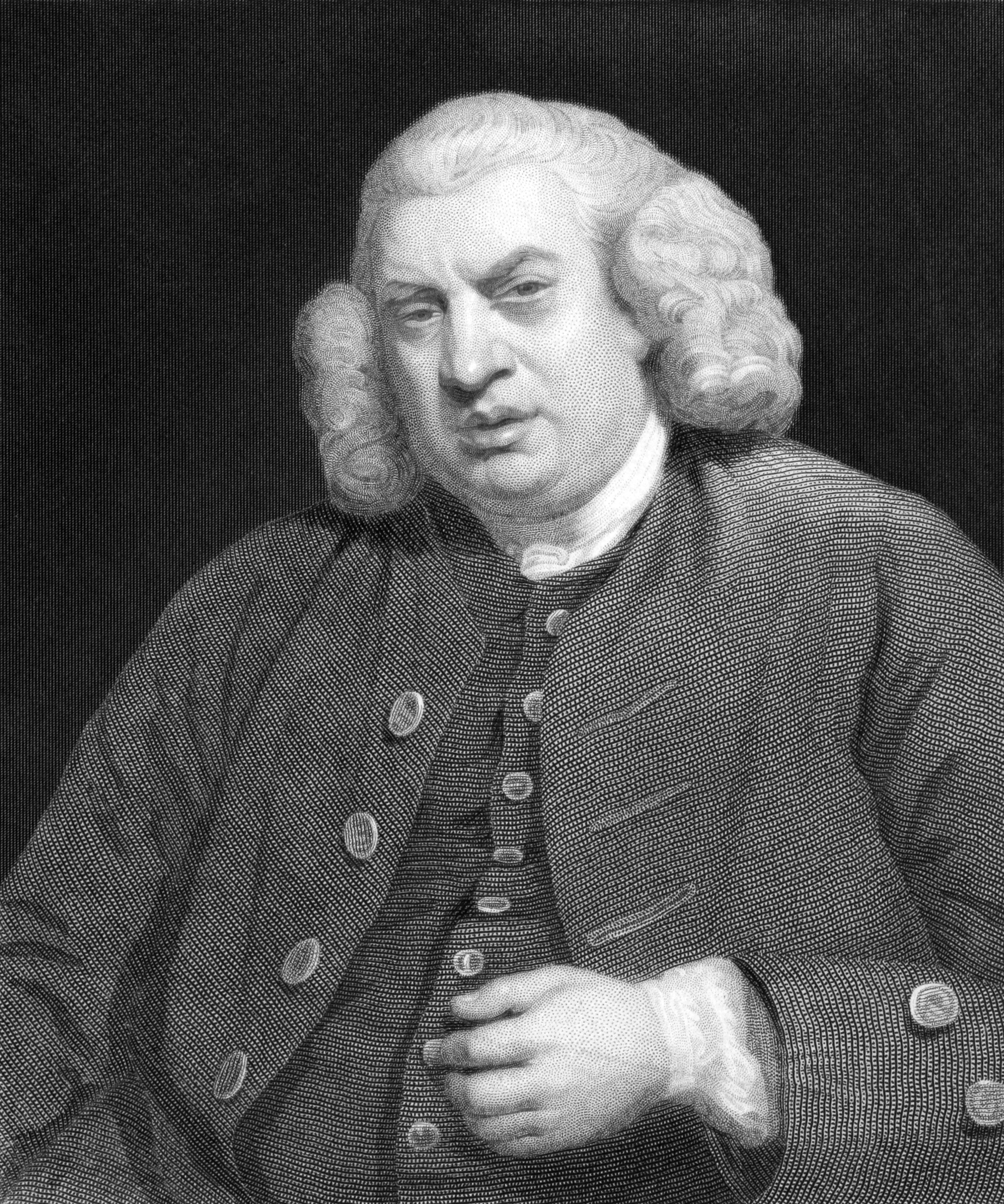
Samuel Johnson, essayist, moralist, literary critic and lexicographer

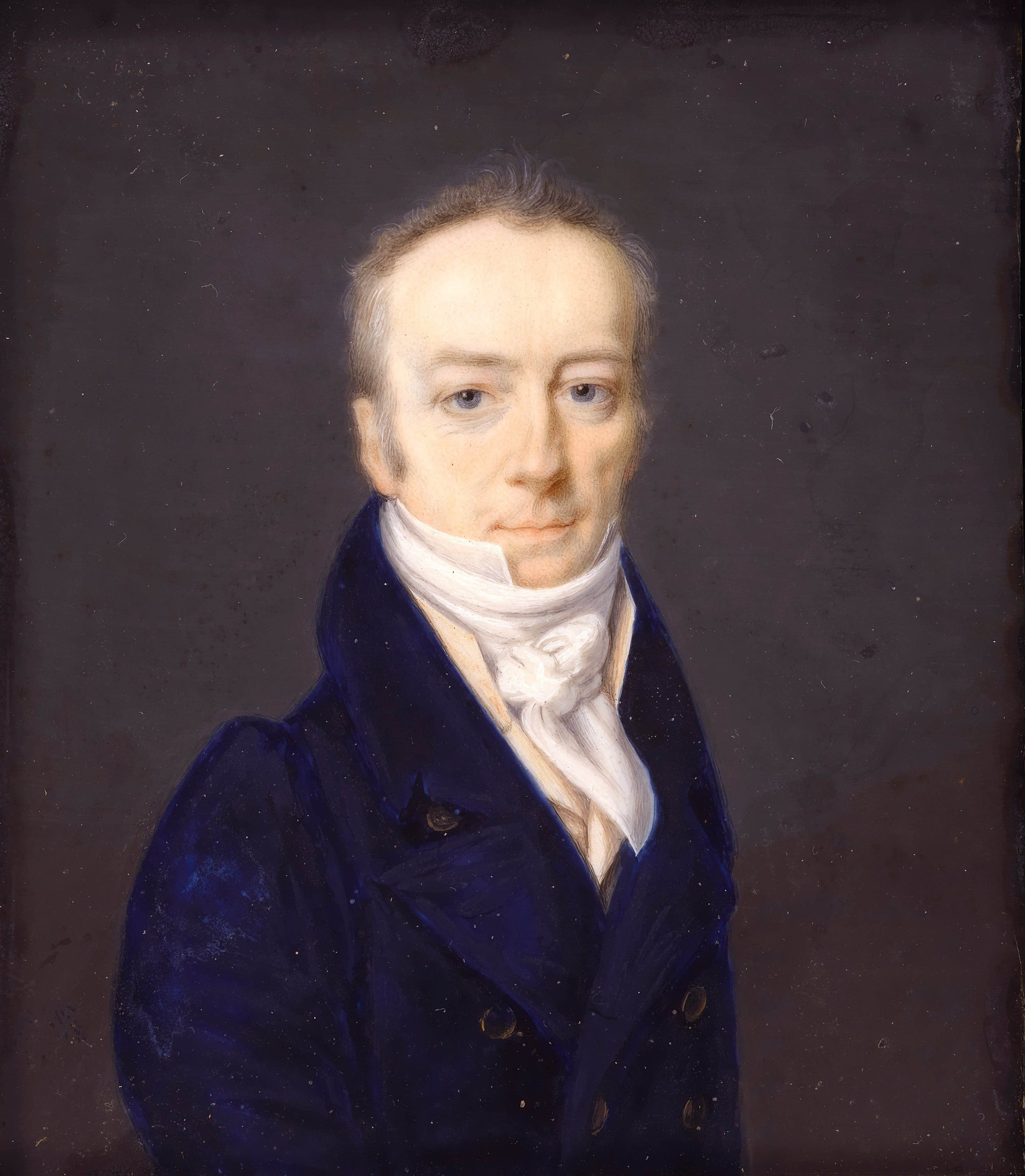
James Smithson, English chemist, founder of the Smithsonian Institution

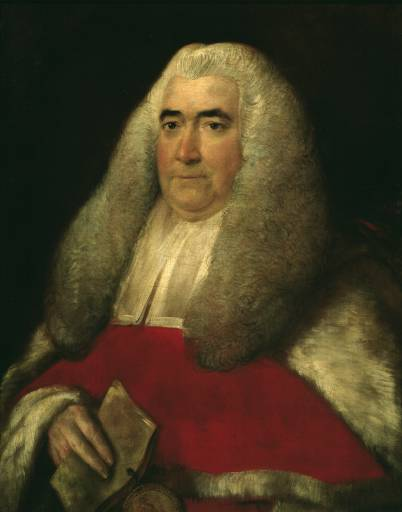
Sir William Blackstone, English jurist and legal scholar, famed for his Commentaries on the Laws of England

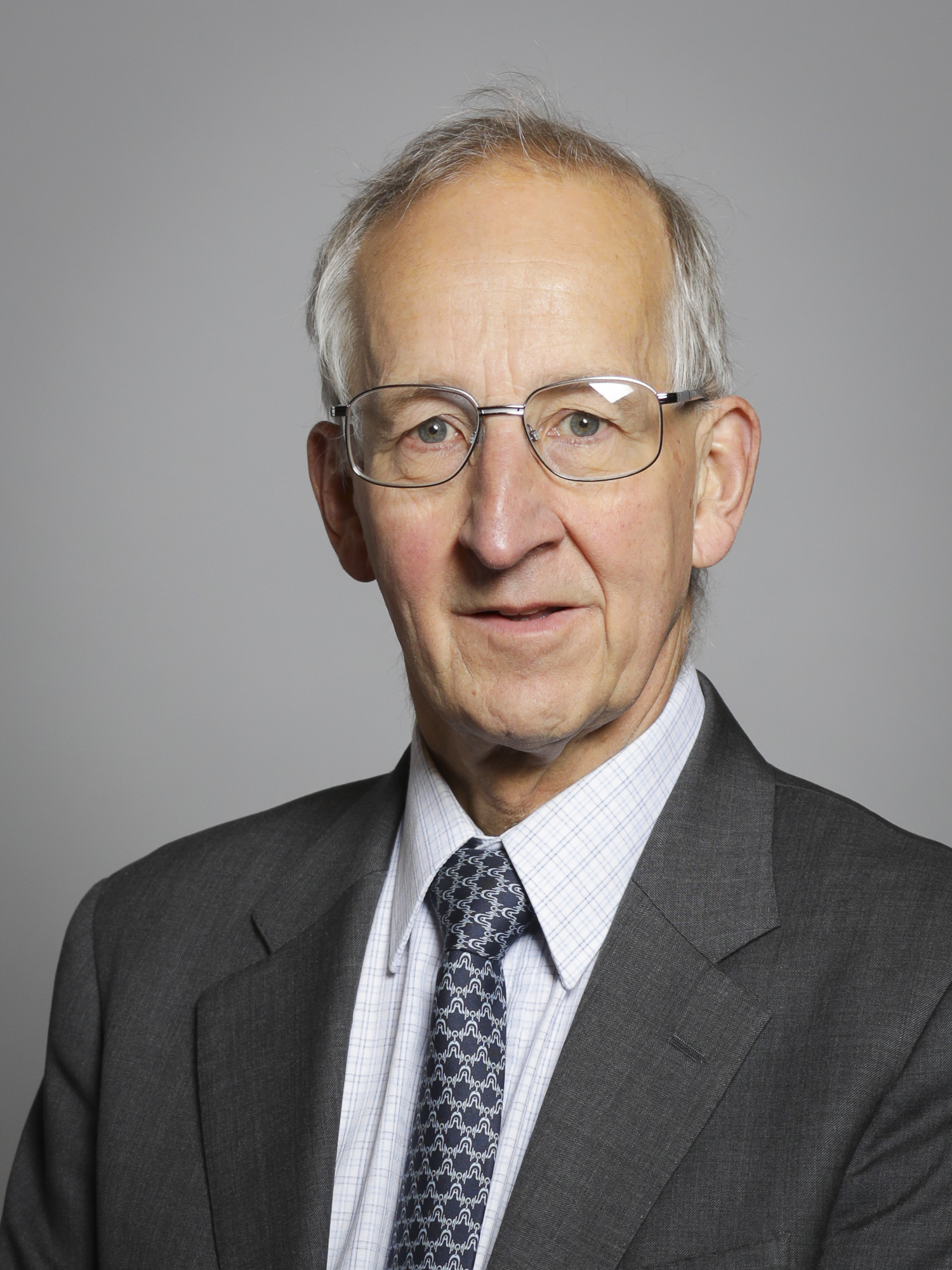
Lord Ricketts, former British Ambassador to France and Chairman of Joint Intelligence Committee

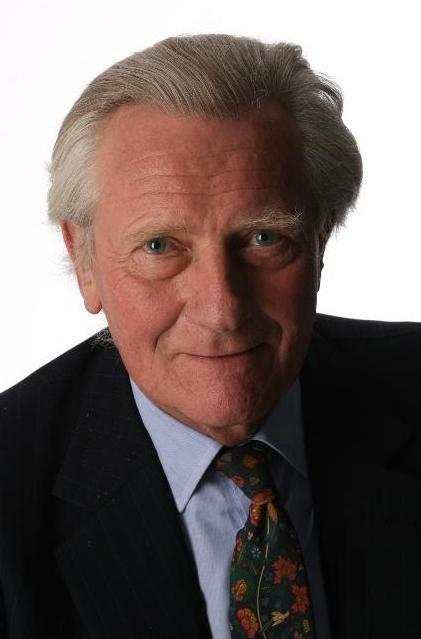
Lord Heseltine, former British Deputy Prime Minister

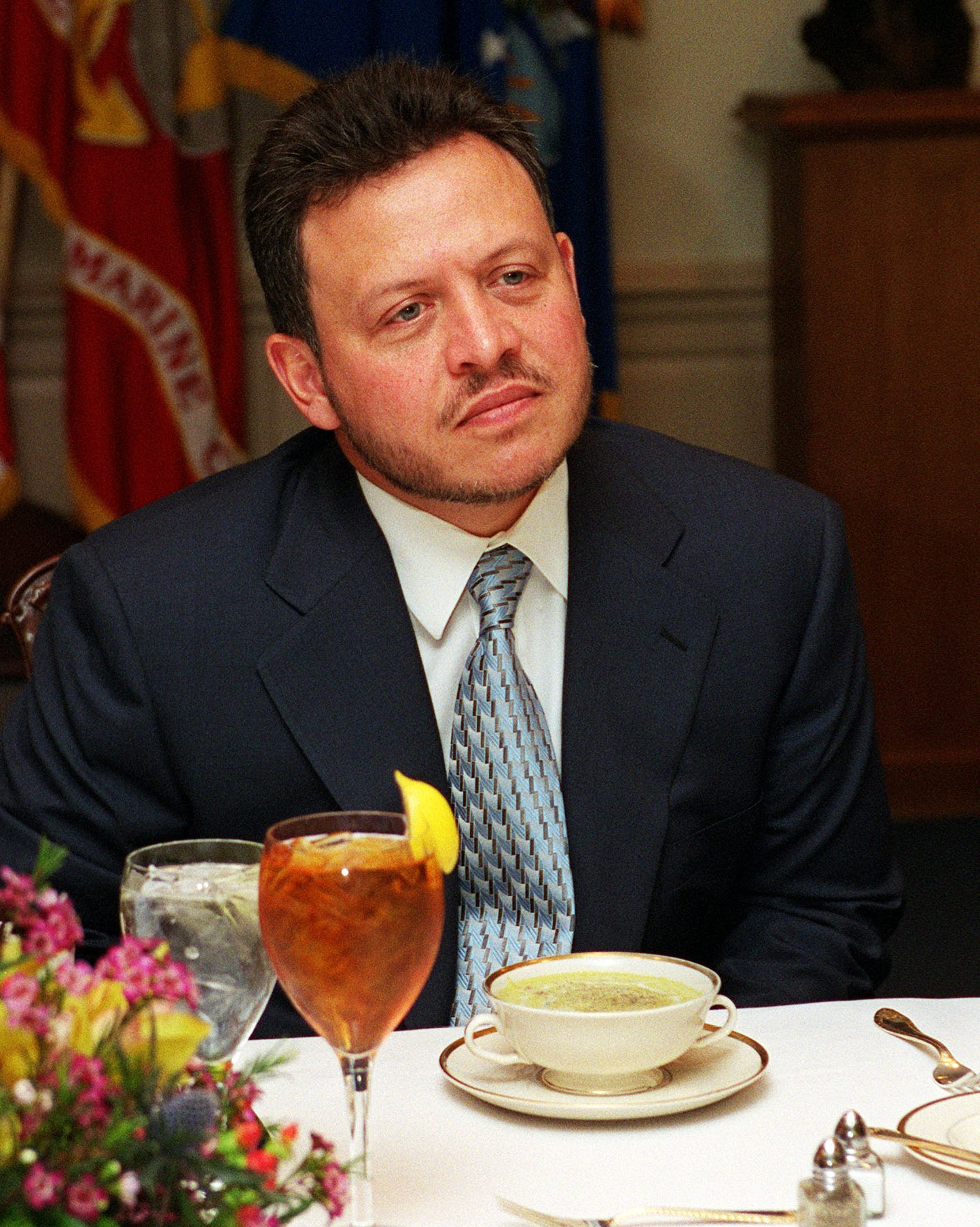
Abdullah II, King of Jordan, read Middle Eastern Affairs in 1982.

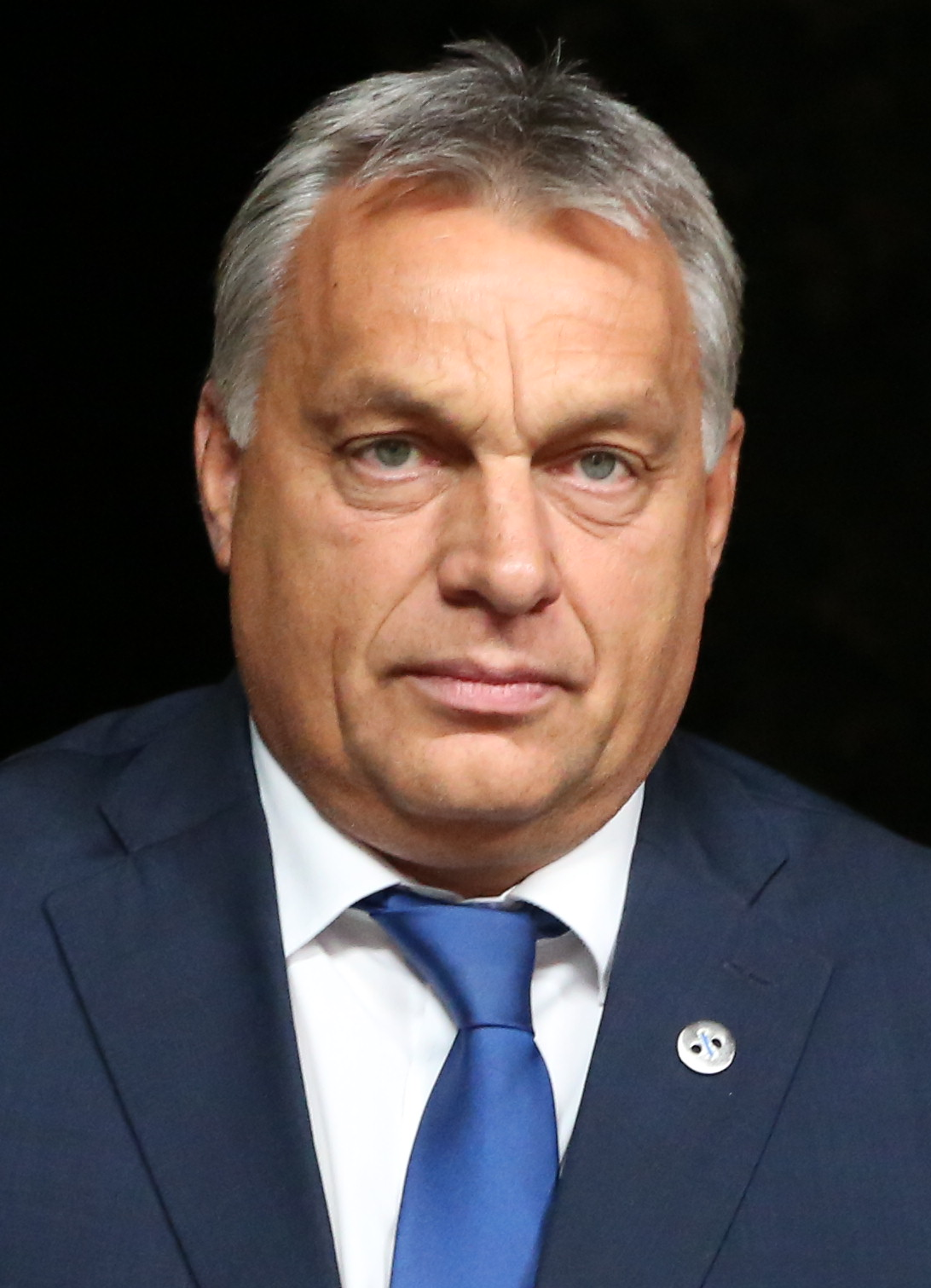
Viktor Orbán, Prime Minister of Hungary

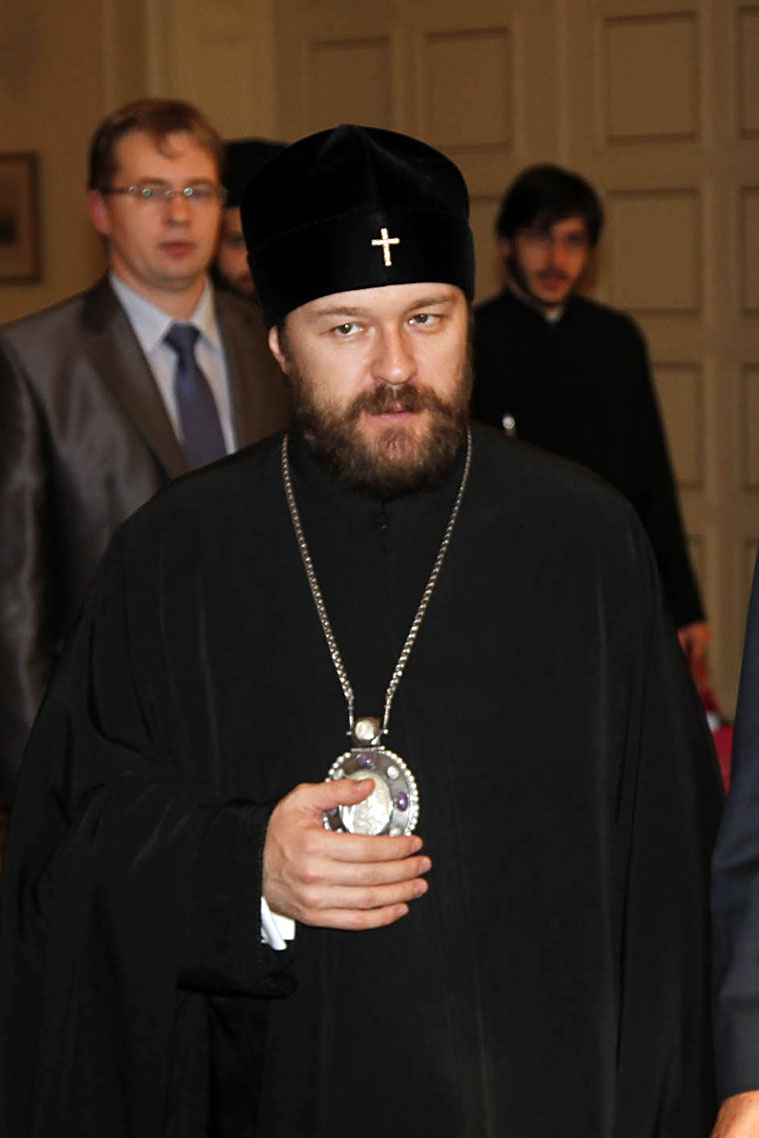
Hilarion Alfayev, Archbishop of Russian Orthodox Church, took a DPhil in 1995.

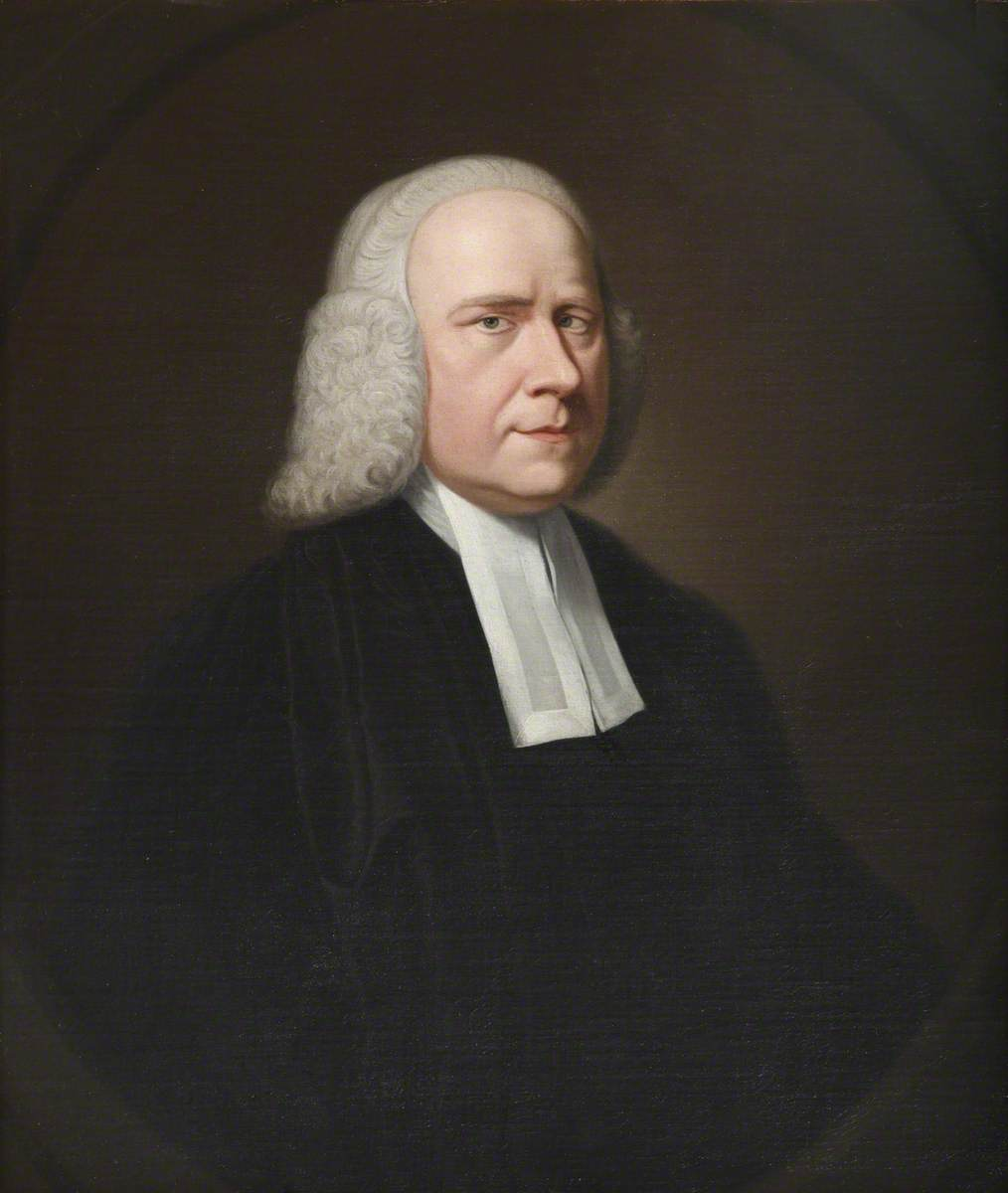
George Whitfield, founder of evangelical Methodism, 18th-century American preacher

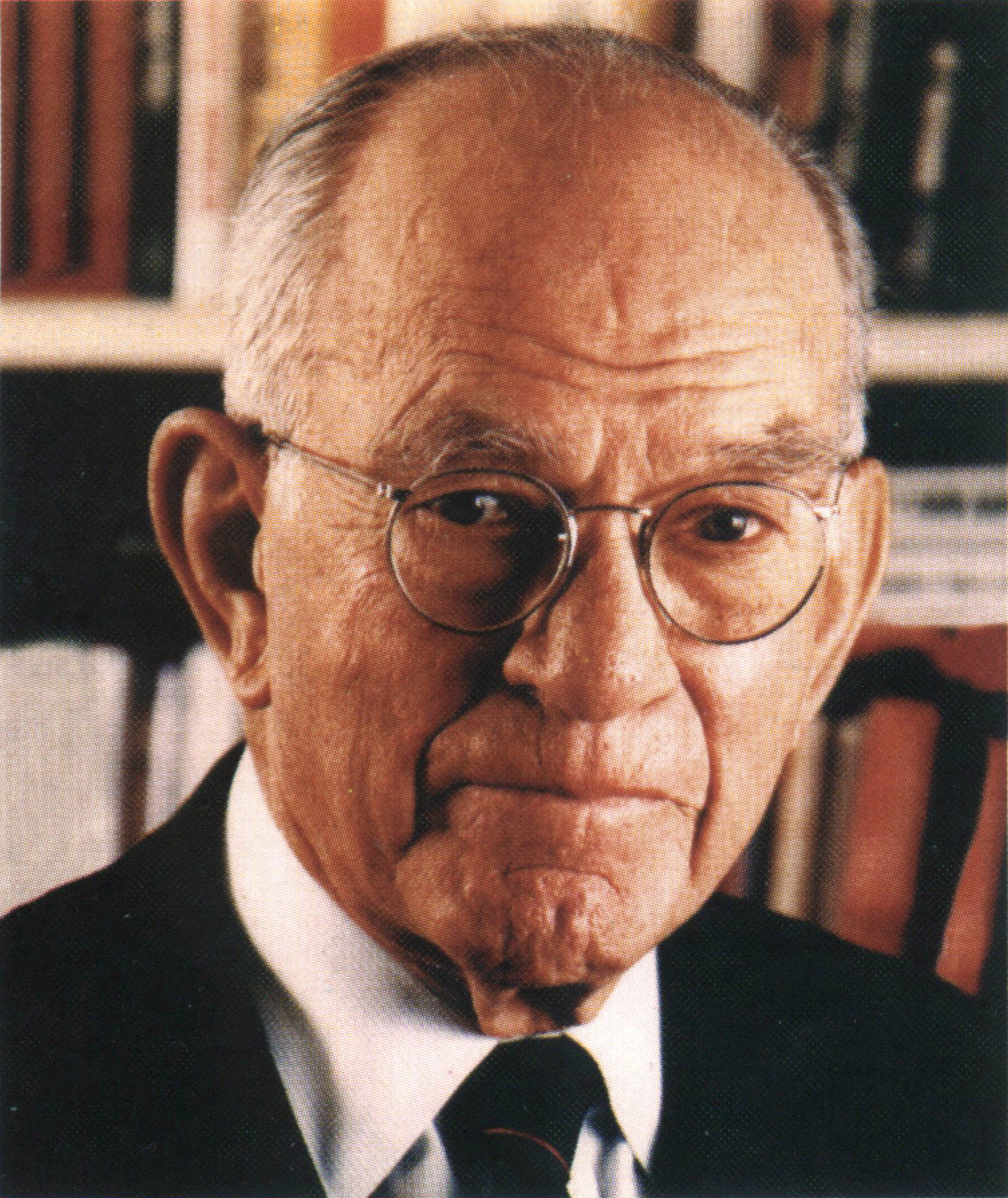
J. William Fulbright, former U.S. Senator from Arkansas, founder of the Fulbright Scholarships

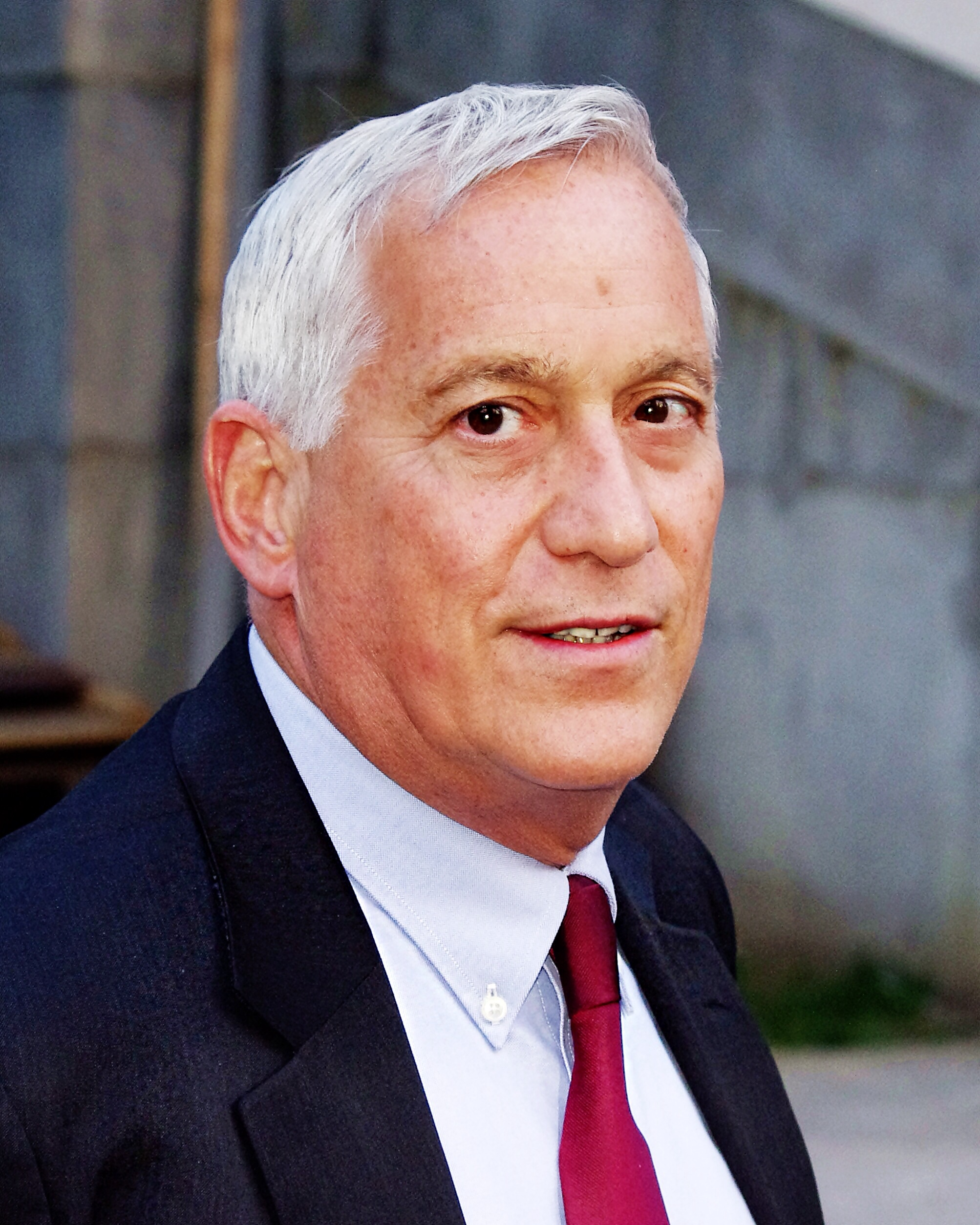
Walter Isaacson, President & CEO of Aspen Institute, biographer

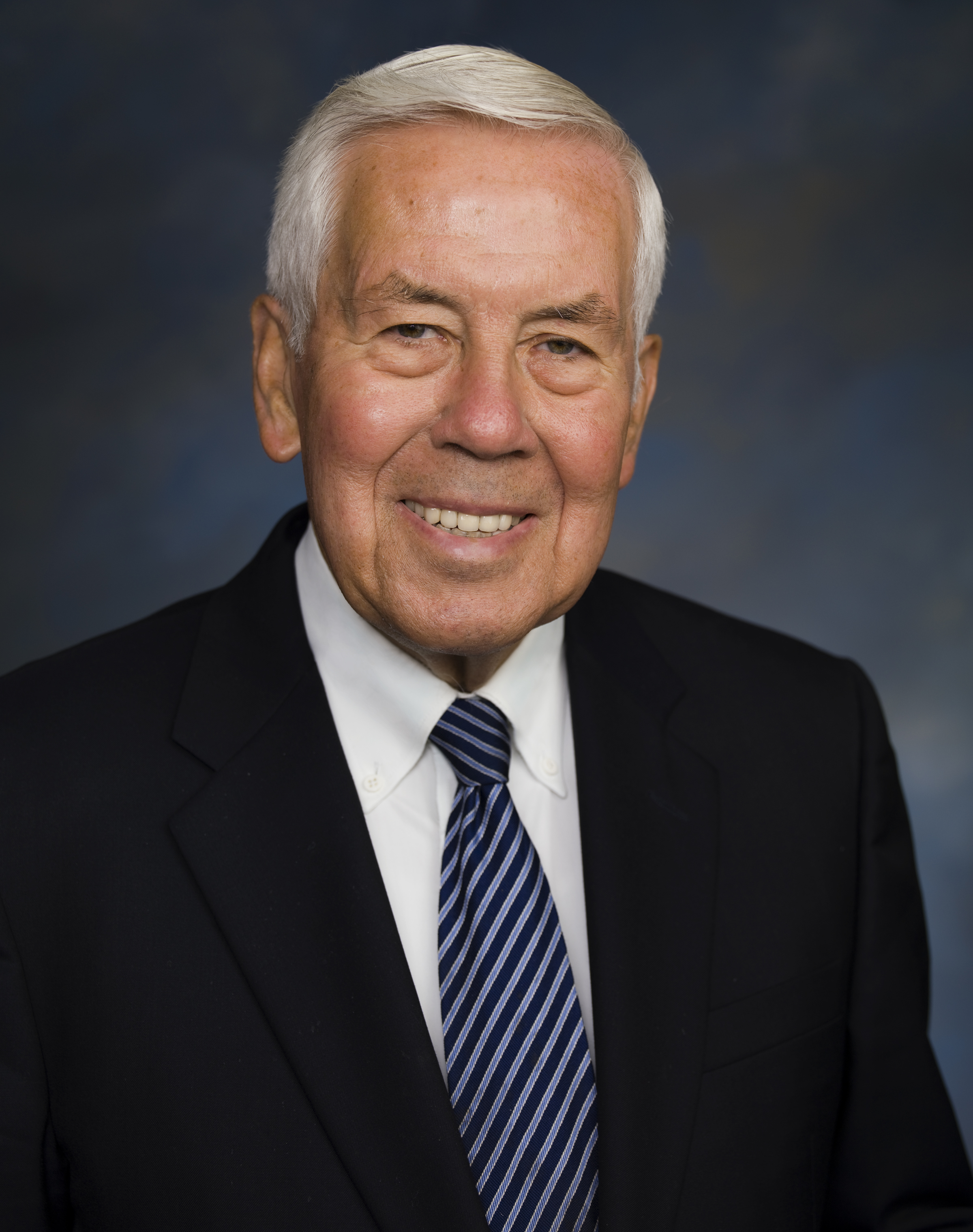
Richard Lugar, former Senator for Indiana, and Chairman of Senate Committee on Foreign Relations

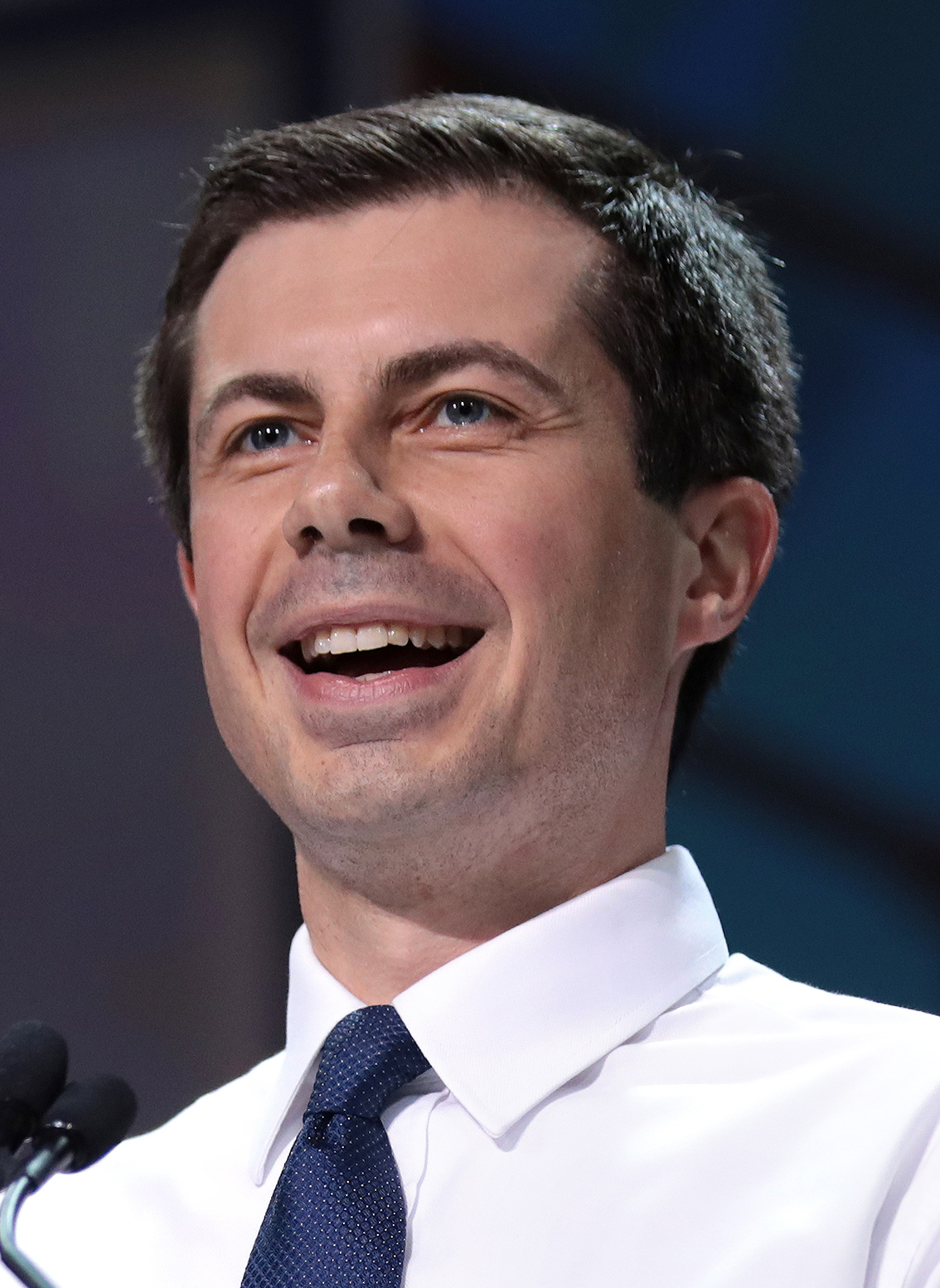
Pete Buttigieg, former U.S. Secretary of Transportation

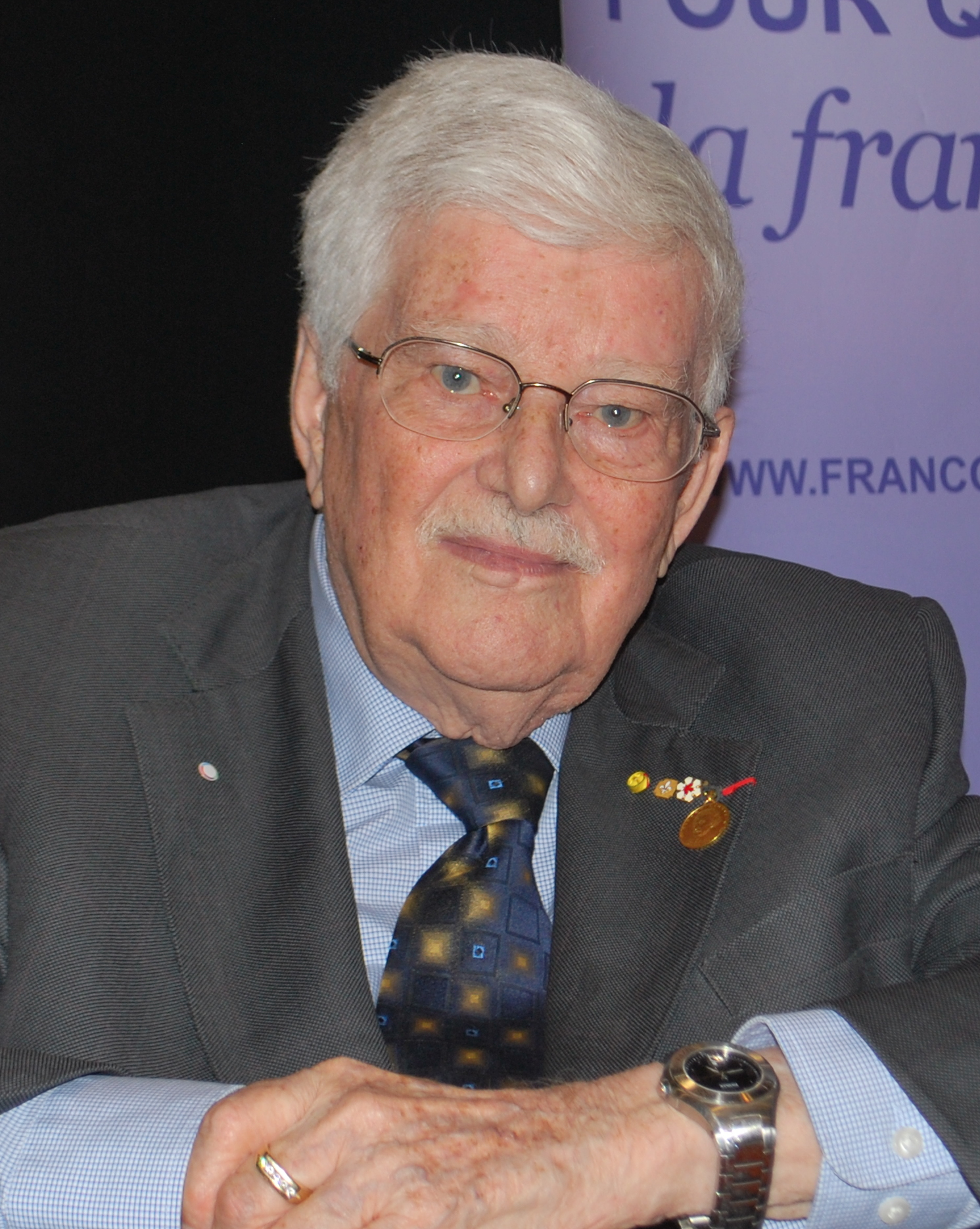
Paul Gérin-Lajoie, Canadian lawyer and politician

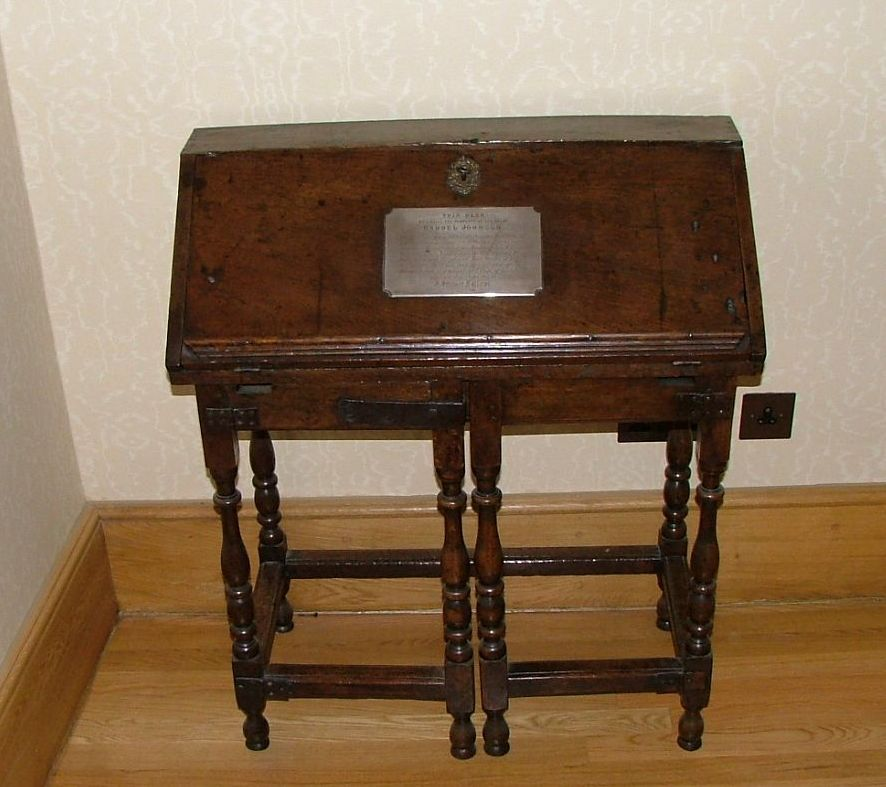
Dr Johnson's desk in Broadgates

Samuel Johnson was one of the college's more famous alumni, though he did not complete his degree (he was later awarded an honorary degree by the University); lack of funds forced him to leave Oxford after about a year and a half. Two of his desks and various other possessions are displayed around the college. He spoke fondly of Pembroke to his death, recalling especially the college's many poets, telling friends that 'we were a nest of singing birds.' James Smithson, whose bequest founded the Smithsonian Institution in Washington, D.C. (despite him never having visited the United States) was an undergraduate at Pembroke, under the name "James Lewis Macie"—he changed his name to that of his natural father after the death of his mother. In addition, Senator J. William Fulbright, who established the Fulbright Program, was a Rhodes Scholar at Pembroke in the 1920s.

In more recent years, Pete Buttigieg, US presidential candidate and former U.S. Secretary of Transportation, completed a graduate degree at Pembroke. Katharine Viner, the first female Editor in Chief of The Guardian, read English at Pembroke in 1990.

==== Diplomacy ====
Thomas Randolph, principal of Pembroke's precursor mediaeval hall, Broadgates, served as ambassador for Elizabeth I to Scotland from 1559, where he gained the friendship of Mary, Queen of Scots, until he was accused of supporting the rebellion of James Stuart. In 1568 he was despatched to Moscow to secure trading rights from Ivan IV, also known as Ivan the Terrible, gaining valuable access to Russia for English merchants of the Muscovy Company.

More recently, John, Baron Kerr of Kinlochard, served as HM Ambassador to the United States from 1995 to 1997, before being appointed Head of the British Foreign and Commonwealth Office. Philip Lader served as US Ambassador to the UK from 1997 to 2001. Thus in 1997, both the US Ambassador in London and the UK Ambassador in Washington were former Pembroke students. Peter, Baron Ricketts was Head of the Foreign and Commonwealth Office from 2006 until 2010, before serving as British Ambassador to France for six years until his retirement in 2016.

Additionally, two former chairmen of the Senate Foreign Relations Committee Senator Richard G. Lugar, (Republican), and Senator J. William Fulbright (Democrat), were students of Pembroke, between them chairing the Senate Foreign Relations Committee for a 27-year period.

From Europe, former Prime Minister of Hungary Viktor Orbán and Polish Foreign Minister Radek Sikorski MEP studied at Pembroke, as did the Sultan Haitham bin Tariq of Oman and King Abdullah II of Jordan.

=== Fellows ===
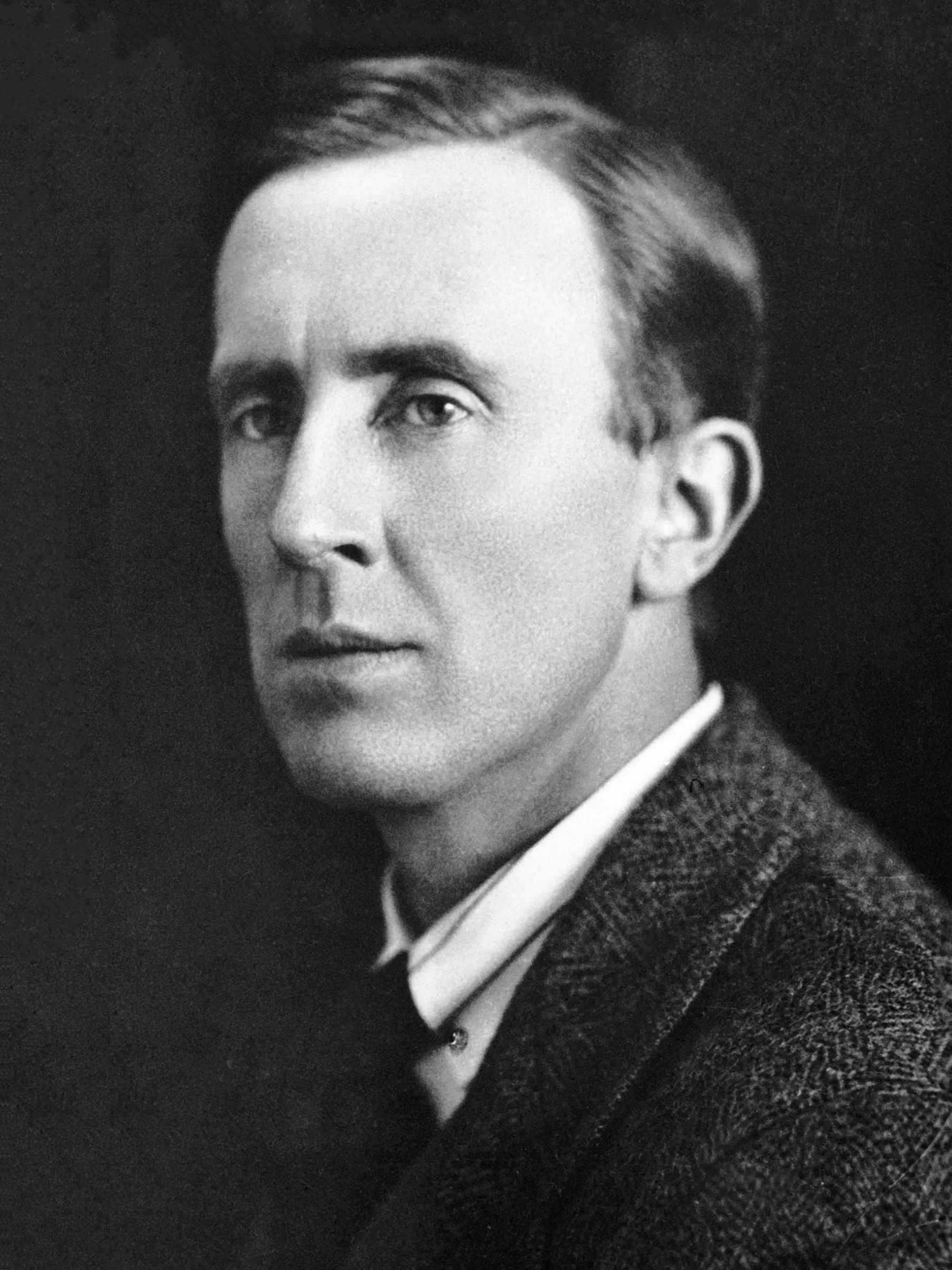
J. R. R. Tolkien, academic and author of The Lord of the Rings

J. R. R. Tolkien was a Fellow of Pembroke from 1925 to 1945, and wrote The Hobbit and the first two volumes of The Lord of the Rings during his time there. Since 2013, the college has held an annual lecture on fantasy literature in his honour. Robin G. Collingwood, historian, philosopher, and author of The Idea of History, was a Fellow of the College between the Great War and the Second World War.

Andy Orchard, a British academic in Old English, Norse and Celtic literature, is Rawlinson and Bosworth Professor of Anglo-Saxon at the University of Oxford and a fellow of Pembroke College, Oxford. He was previously Provost of Trinity College, Toronto, from 2007 to 2013. In 2021, claims of sexual harassment and assault by Orchard were publicized, which were alleged at universities where he has worked, including the University of Cambridge, the University of Toronto, and the University of Oxford.

=== Masters ===
Among the college's more recent Masters are Sir Geoffrey Arthur, former chairman of the Joint Intelligence Committee, and Sir Roger Bannister, the first man to run the mile in under four minutes. Sir Ernest Ryder, a former Lord Justice of Appeal, succeeded Dame Lynne Brindley as Master of Pembroke College on 1 July 2020.
