= Blue Boar =

Blue Boar may refer to:

- Blue Boar Quadrangle
- Blue Boar Street in Oxford
- Blue Boar Cafeterias, a defunct cafeteria chain in the Southern United States
- Blue Boar cafe at Watford Gap services
- The Blue Boar, a former public house in Grantham
- Blue Boar (bomb), a cold war era television-guided bomb
- Blue Boar, York, a pub
- Blue Boar bar in the Conrad London St. James hotel in Westminster
