= Bear Lane =

Street in central Oxford, England

Coordinates: 51.7516°N 1.2551°W

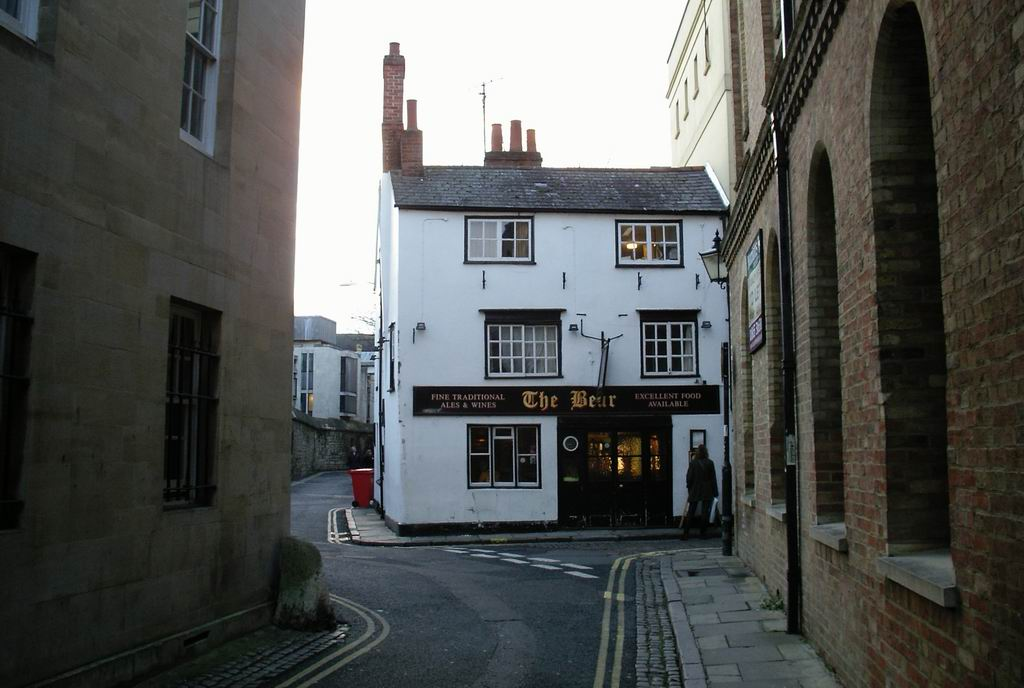
Looking west along Bear Lane towards The Bear, a historic public house.

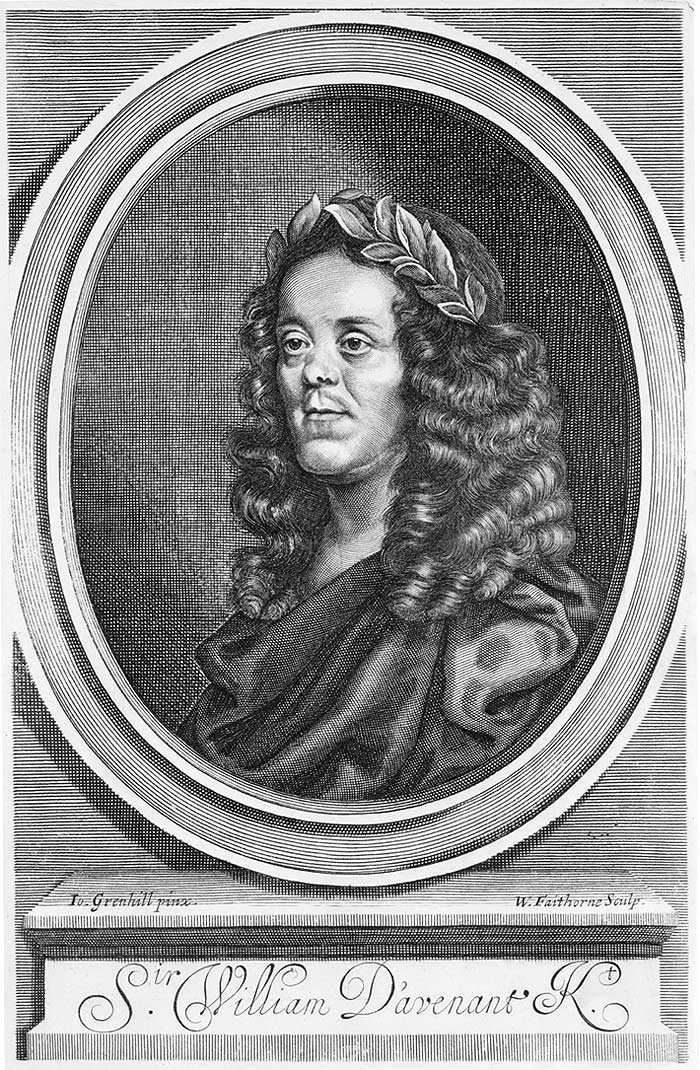
William Davenant (1606–1668), poet and playwright, born at the Crown Tavern, Bear Lane.

Bear Lane is a short historic street in central Oxford, England. The lane is located just north of Christ Church. It runs between the junction of Blue Boar Street and Alfred Street to the west, and King Edward Street and the north of Oriel Square to the east.

The south side of Bear Lane faces the back of Christ Church's Peckwater Quad while the north side opens onto a sizeable accommodation complex belonging to Lincoln College. The complex, known to students simply as Bear Lane, houses over a hundred students and reaches all the way to High Street. The site was inherited by the College from Emmelina Carr in 1436. A residential centre for graduate studies was opened in 1977, designed by Geoffrey Beard. Further student accommodation for the College has been added between Bear Lane and the High Street to the north, completed in 1995. This building complex incorporates many historic features, including the Painted Room, which has 16th-century frescoes and panelling. This was originally part of the Crown Tavern, a former historic Oxford inn. The poet and playwright William Davenant, a student of Lincoln College, was born here and William Shakespeare, Davenant's godfather, visited here.

The Bear is a historic public house located on the corner of Alfred Street at the western end, dating back to 1242. A unique feature of this pub is a large collection of tie snippets displayed on its walls and ceiling.

Alfred Street was named Bear Lane in the 17th and 18th centuries.
