= Tom Quad =

One of the quadrangles of Christ Church, Oxford, England

Coordinates: 51°45′01″N 1°15′21″W

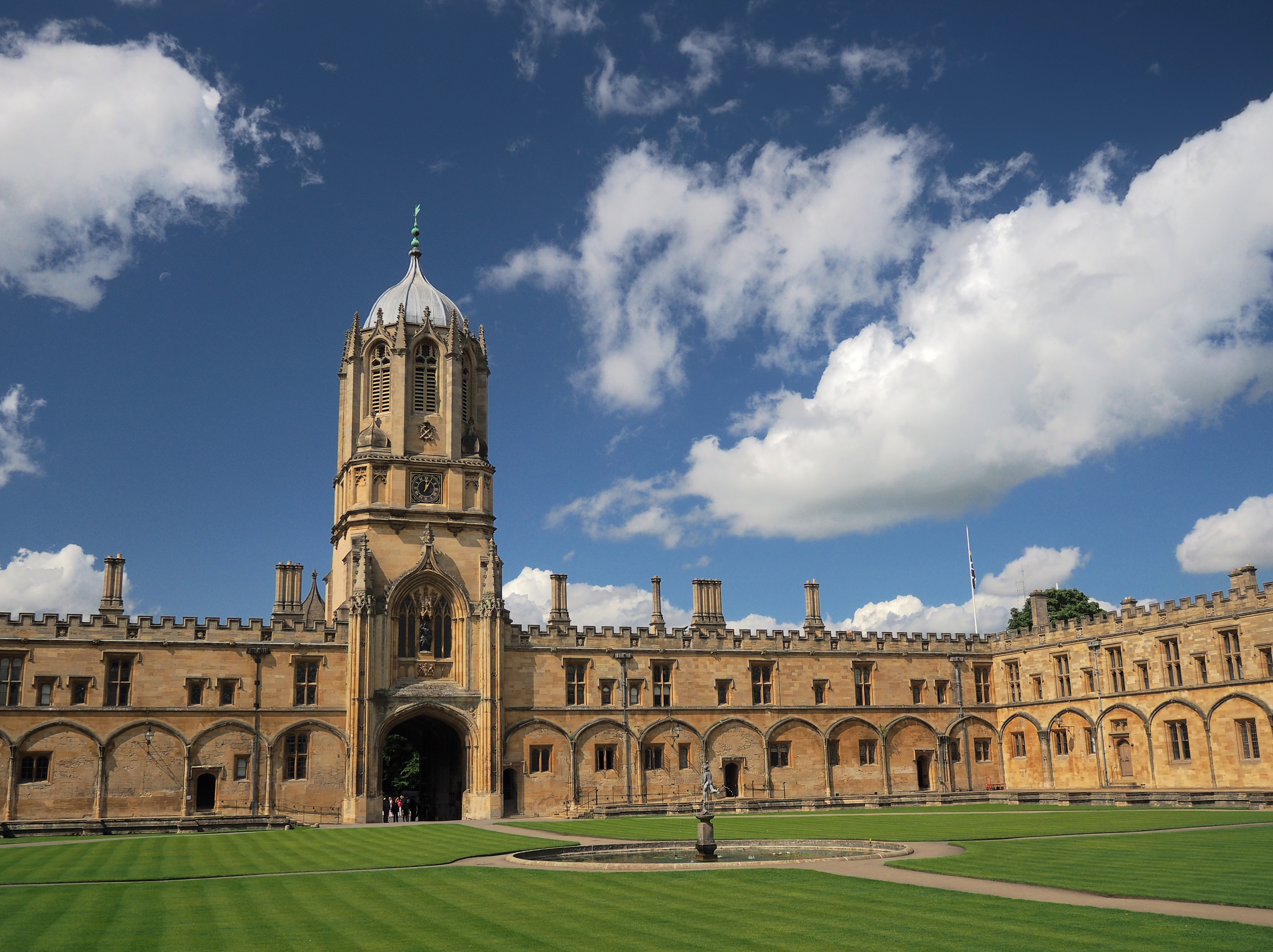
View of Tom Quad (1525–1529), including Tom Tower (1681–1682)

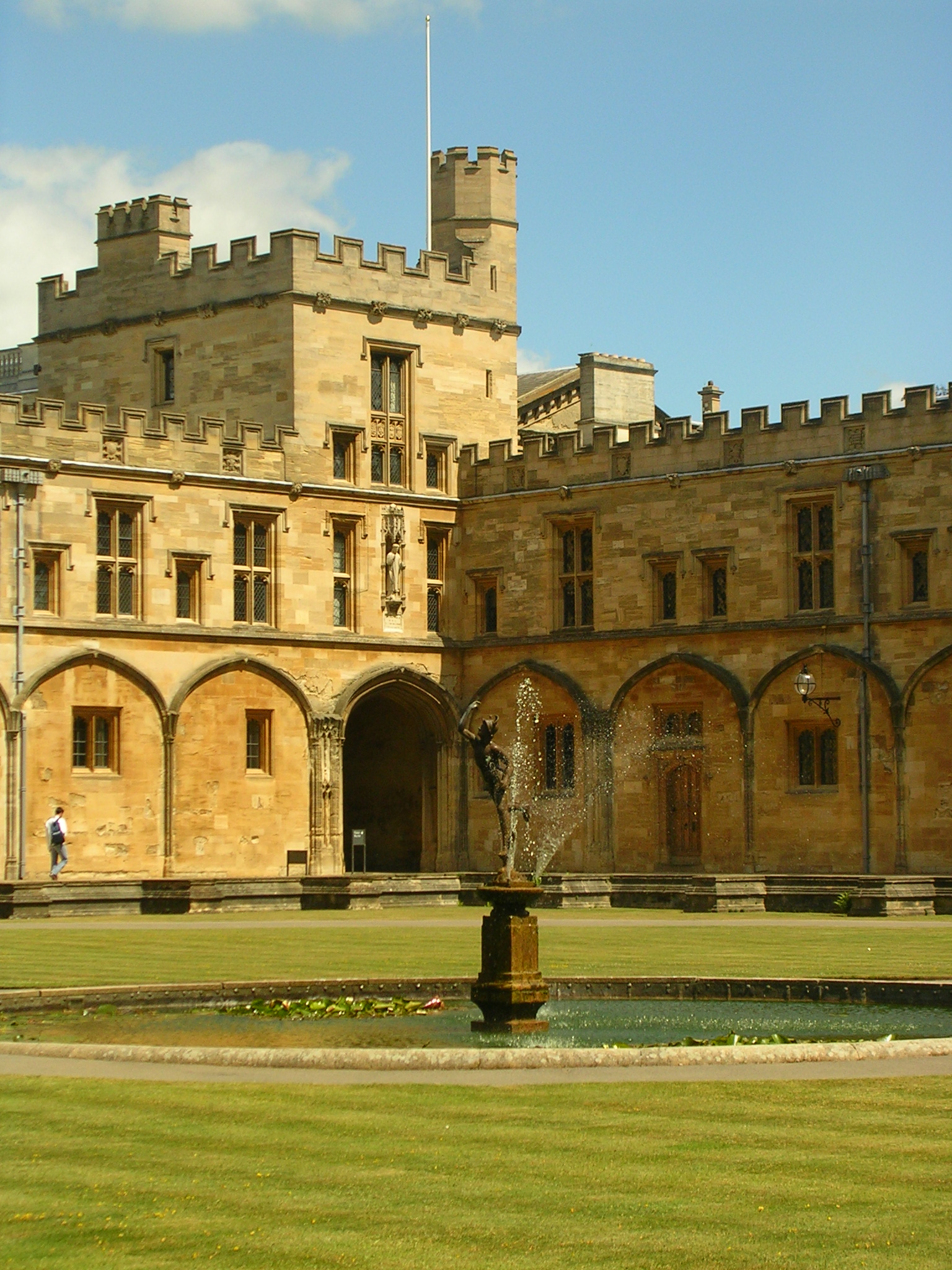
The Mercury fountain

The Great Quadrangle, more popularly known as Tom Quad, is one of the quadrangles of Christ Church, Oxford, England. It is the largest college quad in Oxford, measuring 264 by 261 feet. Although it was begun by Cardinal Wolsey in 1525–1529, he was unable to complete it before his fall from power.

Wolsey planned a cloister, but only the starts of the arches on the walls, and of the supports jutting into the lawn were done; these can still be seen around the quadrangle. The main entrance was also left incomplete, and it is not known how the gatehouse was planned to look. After some 150 years, the gatehouse was completed in 1681–1682 with Tom Tower, designed by Sir Christopher Wren, when John Fell was Dean. A statue of Queen Anne on Tom Tower overlooks the main entrance to the Quad. The quad is listed Grade I on the National Heritage List for England.

== Description ==
The funds for the building of Tom Quad were found from the suppression of three Norbertine abbeys. It is dominated to the west by Tom Tower, designed by Sir Christopher Wren. On the east side is the entrance to Christ Church Cathedral and at the south-east corner is the entrance to the college dining hall. The north contains the homes of the canons of Christ Church, and much of the east side is taken up with the Deanery, in which the Dean of the college lives. On the north-east side, the quad leads, via Kilcannon, to Peckwater Quadrangle and the college library. In the north-west part of the quad is the Junior Common Room ("JCR"). Parts of the quad are still lived in by undergraduates, including the staircase above the Porter's lodge, known as "Bachelors' Row", to the left of the quadrangle when entered via Tom Gate. Bachelors' Row was only inhabited by first year male undergraduates until 2014, when the first female first year undergraduates took up residence there.

== Mercury fountain ==
In the centre of the quad, there is an ornamental pond with a statue of Mercury. In the past, it was traditional for "hearties" (sporty students) to throw "aesthetes" (more artistic students) into this pond. Currently, entrance to Mercury carries a heavy fine for undergraduates. The pond also contains a large koi carp apparently worth a hefty sum, and donated by the Empress of Japan. The base of the fountain was designed by Sir Edwin Lutyens, the architect who designed much of India's modern capital New Delhi.

Lady Gwendolyn Cecil, in the biography of her father (the last Victorian Prime Minister Lord Salisbury), recounts how as a student in the 1840s, he rescued his bookish friends from being dunked in the fountains, by infiltrating the hearties and tipping off his friends about the time of the planned raid, and arranging with them a counter-ambush:

Late that night the intended victim sat in full view of his window, apparently solitary and absorbed in a book. But when his opponents approached the room, flushed with wine and encouraged by the certainty of victory by the unsported oak before them and by the silence that reigned around, they were suddenly startled by a yell from the dark abyss of the staircase above and at the same moment overborne by a tumultuously rushing descent. A minute later, entirely demoralized, they were flying around the quad pursued by a dozen of the most sober, respectable, and peace-loving of the reading men in the college... The next day their opponents were the laughing-stock of the college, and for some time to come a man at Christ Church might read as much and drink as little as he pleased with complete impunity'.

== Gallery ==
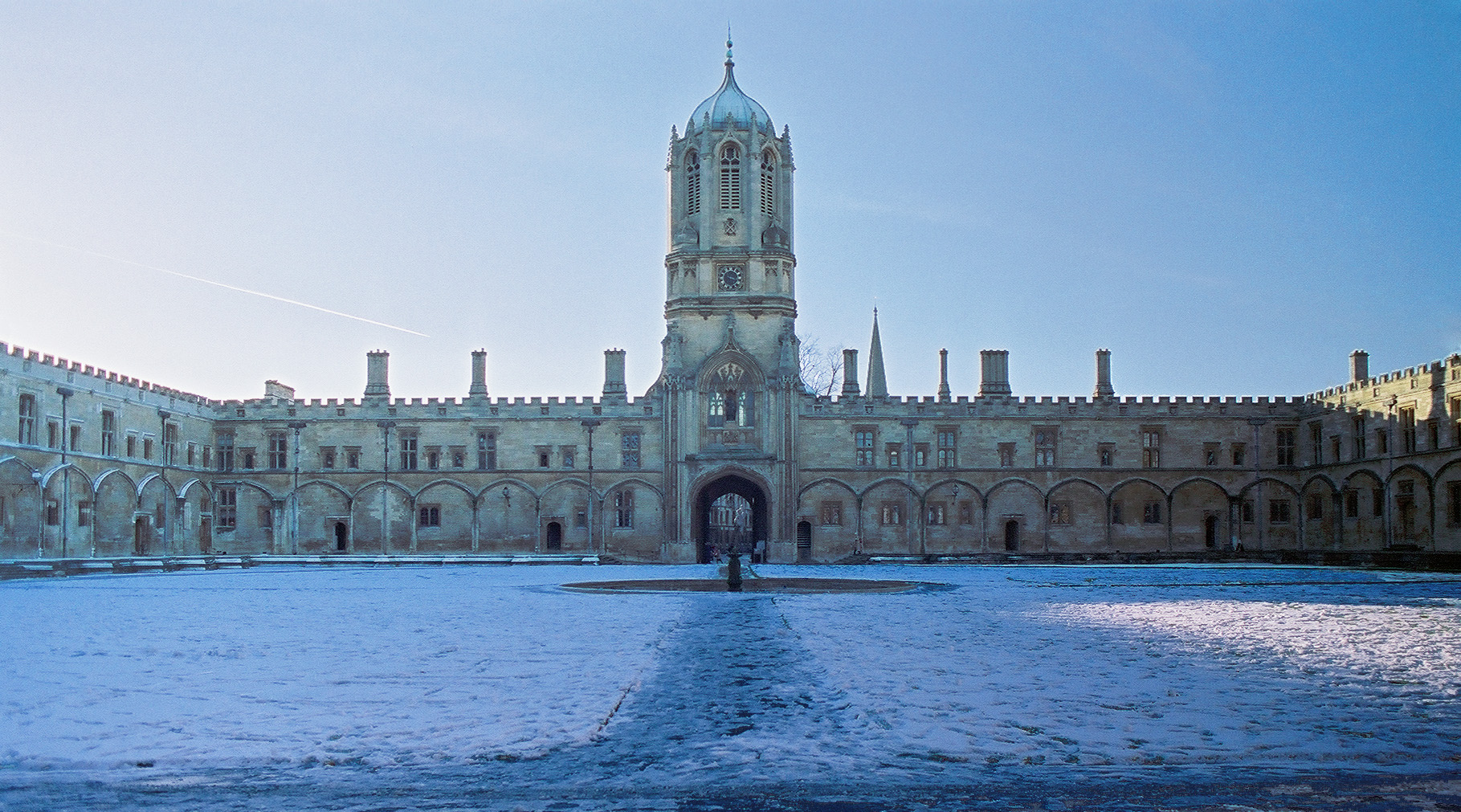
Winter view of Tom Quad in the snow.

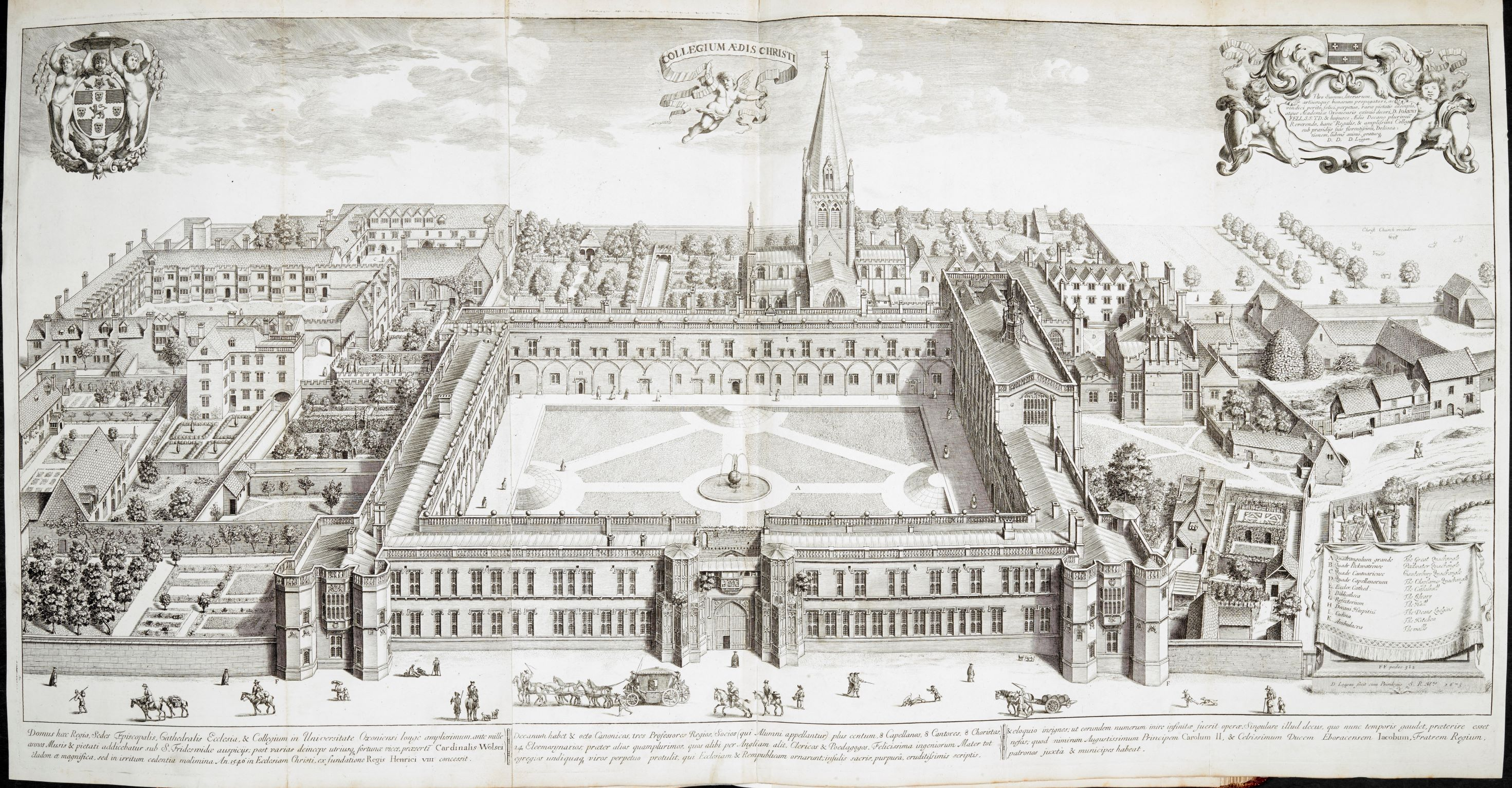
Print of 1675, before Wren's additions, David Loggan, Oxonia Illustrata

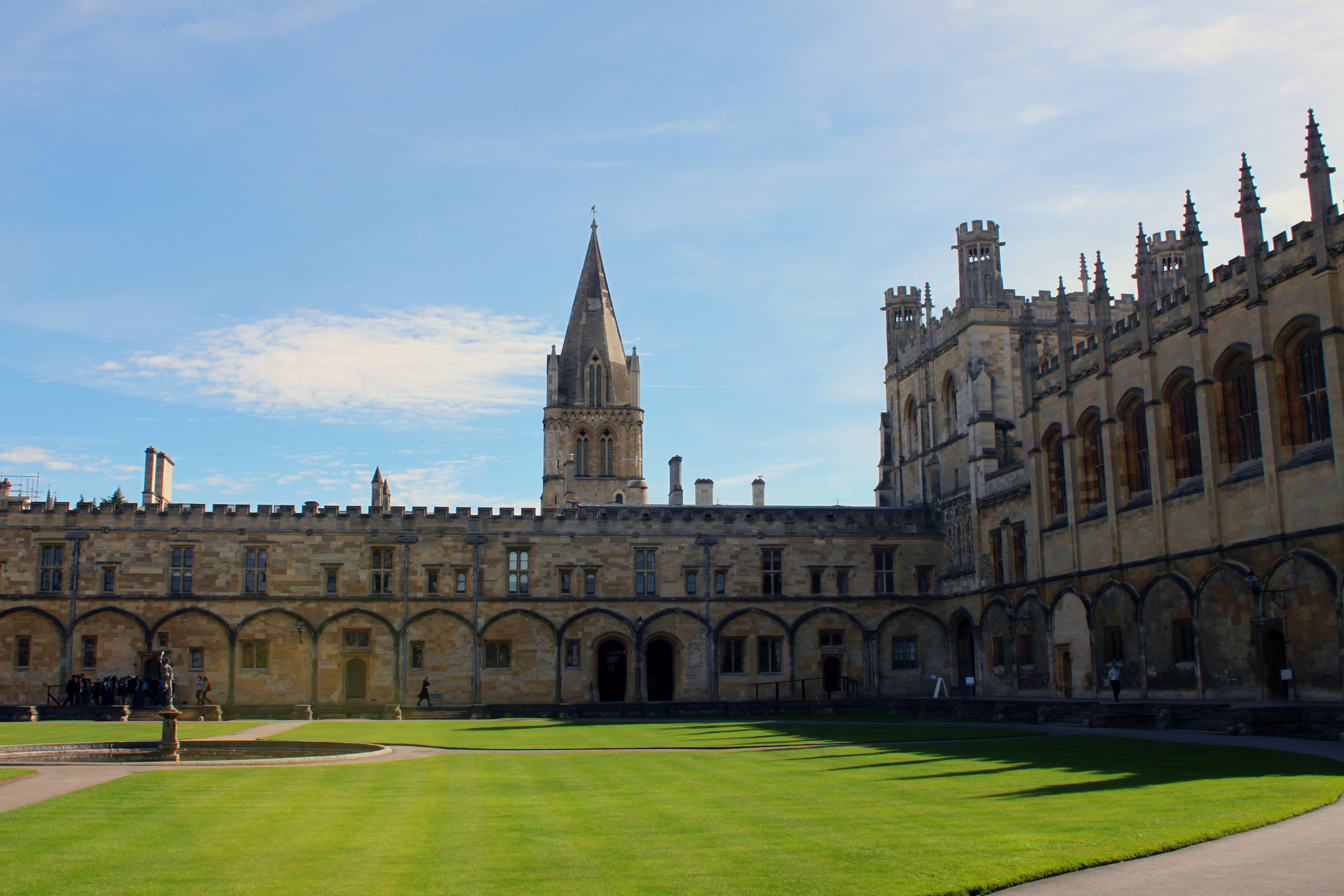
Spire of the cathedral in centre, hall at right

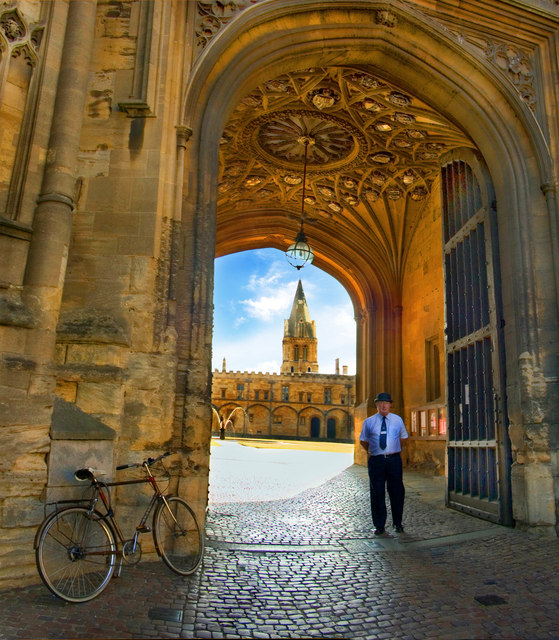
The entrance to Tom Quad

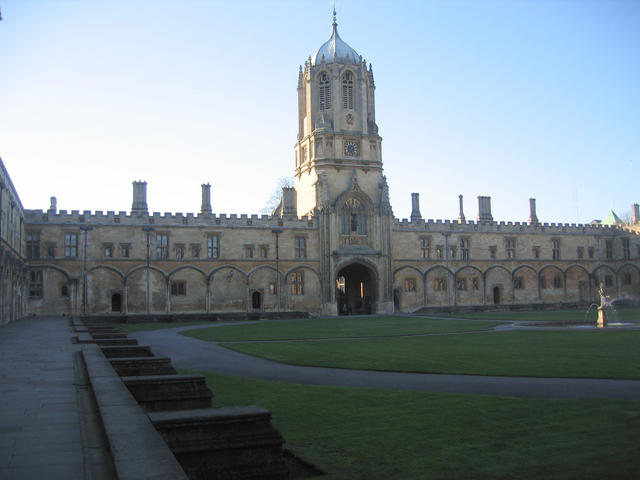
A view looking towards Tom Tower, from the entrance to the hall

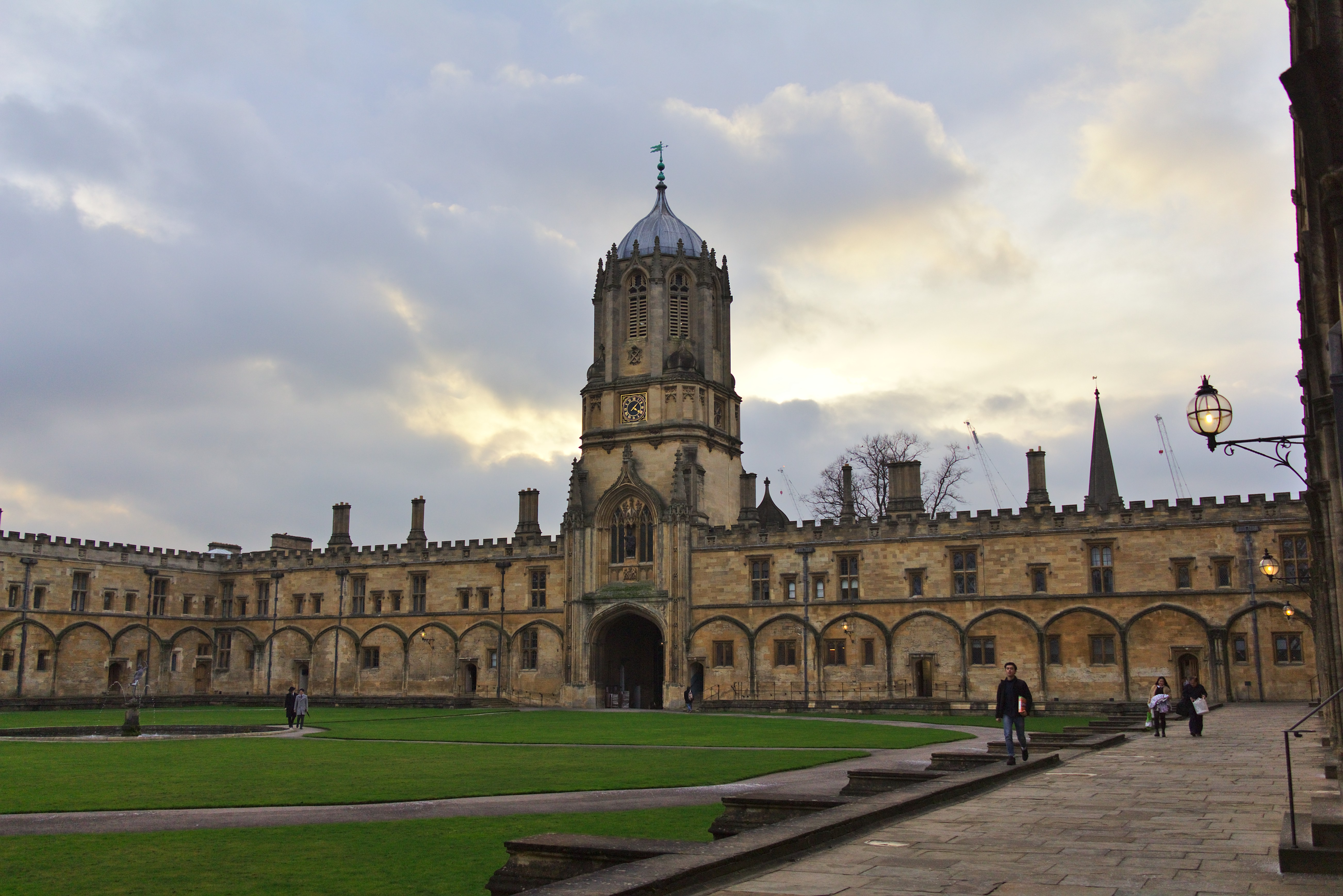
Tom Tower and Tom Quad. View on a warm winter evening.

== See also ==
- Peckwater Quadrangle
- Blue Boar Quadrangle
- Meadow Building
- Christ Church Library
- Dunster House at Harvard
