= Vine Hall, Oxford =

Former hall of the University of Oxford

Coordinates: 51.7514°N 1.2554°W

Vine Hall was an academic hall of the University of Oxford, located on Alfred Street in the 16th century. It became a part of the Peckwater Quadrangle of Christ Church, Oxford. The building gave its name to the previous name for Alfred Street, particularly the southwards continuation of it; Vine Hall Lane. Some have said that the current name Alfred Street is of unknown aetiology and pointless, and the street should be renamed Vine Hall Lane. It was previously known as St Edward's Lane, but the name Vine Hall Lane was in use by 1576.

Vine Hall, together with Peckwater's Inn and the smaller and older Brid Hall and Maiden Hall were given to Christ Church by King Henry VIII in 1547. It once housed a famous grammar school where John Leland taught.

It was a hall of civil lawyers in the 16th century.

== Bibliography ==
- Anthony à Wood (1773). The Antient and Present State of the City of Oxford. John Pechell. J. and F. Rivington.
