= Tom Tower =

Bell tower in Oxford, England

Coordinates: 51°45′00″N 1°15′24″W

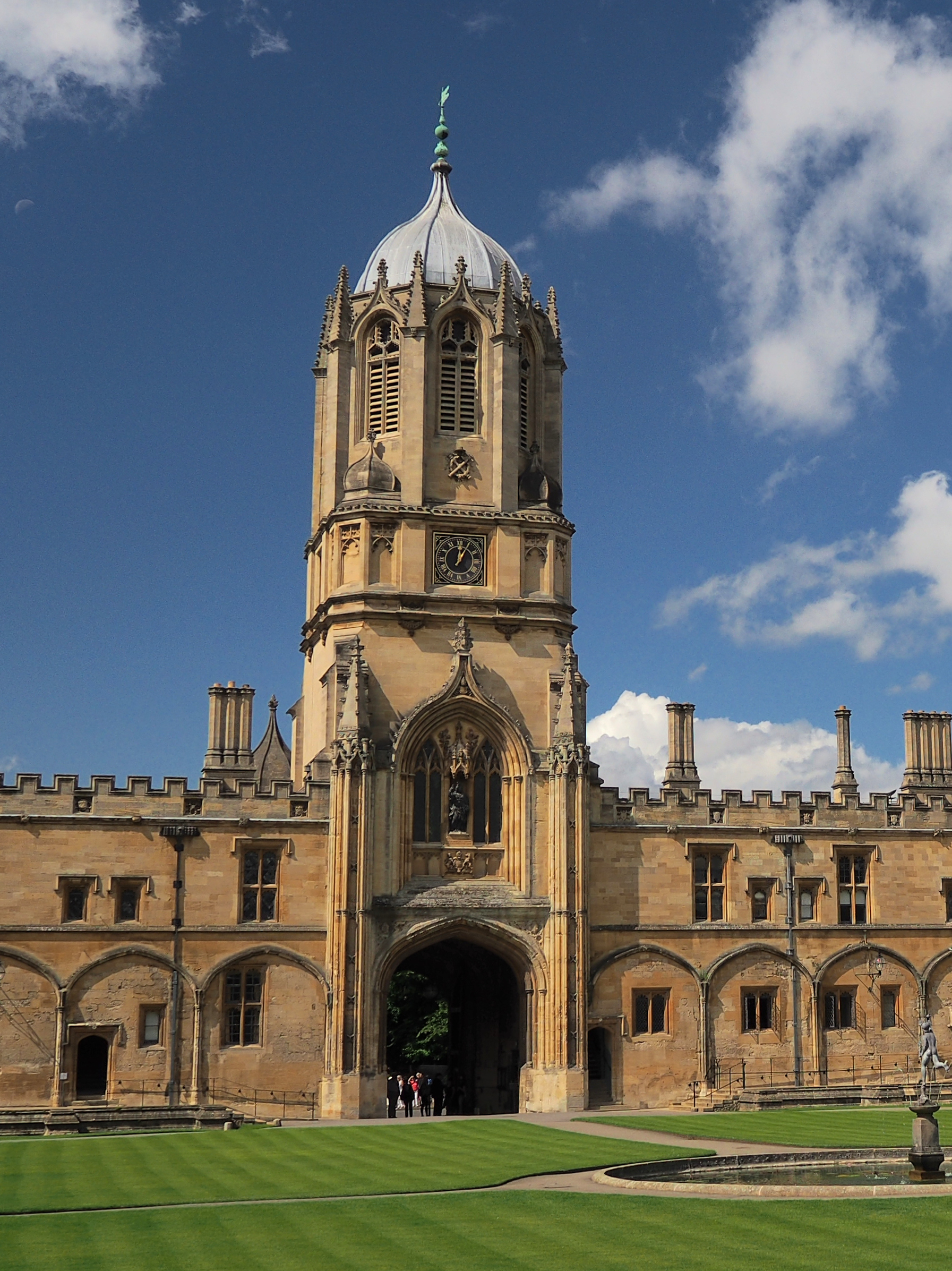
Tom Tower seen from Tom Quad

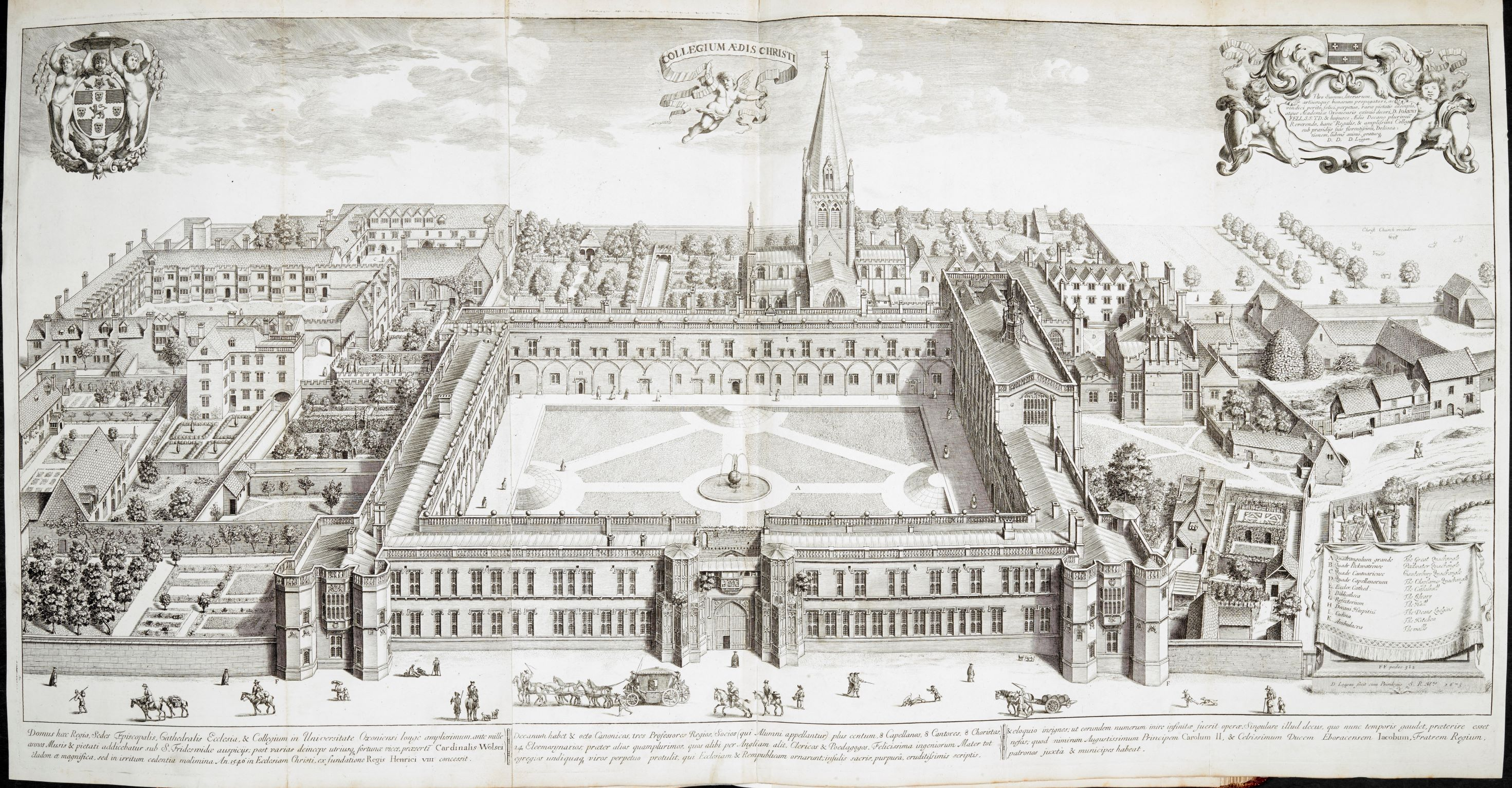
Print of 1675, before Wren's additions, David Loggan, Oxonia Illustrata

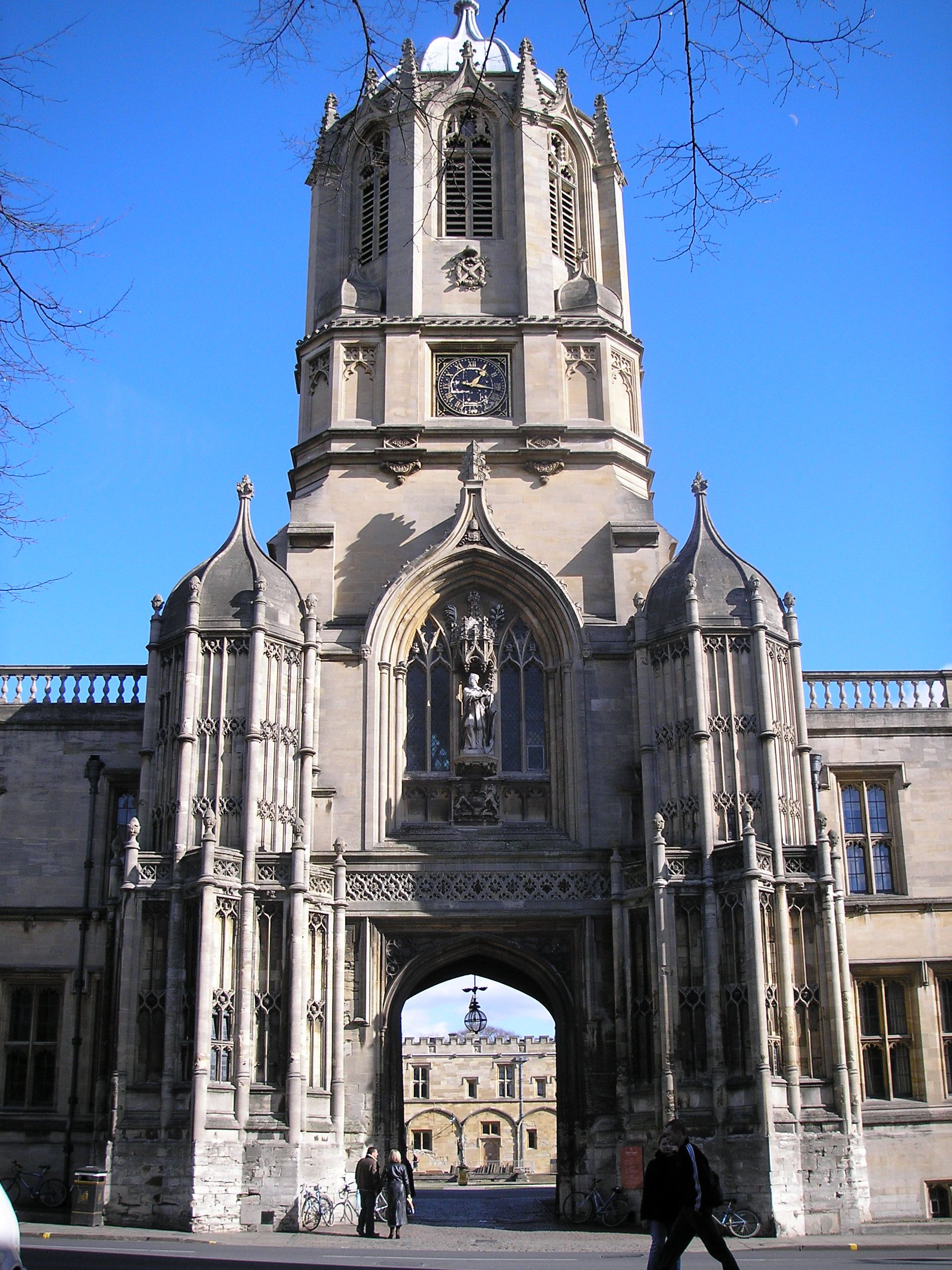
Tom Tower seen from St Aldates

Tom Tower is a bell tower in Oxford, England, named after its bell, Great Tom. It stands over Tom Gate, on St Aldates, the main entrance of Christ Church, Oxford, which leads into Tom Quad. This square tower with an octagonal lantern and facetted ogee dome was designed by Christopher Wren and built 1681–82. The strength of Oxford architectural tradition and Christ Church's connection to its founder, Henry VIII, motivated the decision to complete the gatehouse structure, left unfinished by Cardinal Wolsey at the date of his fall from power in 1529, and which had remained roofless since. Wren made a case for working in a Late Gothic style—that it "ought to be Gothick to agree with the Founders worke"—a style that had not been seen in a prominent building for a hundred and fifty years, making Tom Tower a lonely precursor of the Gothic Revival that got underway in the mid-18th century. Wren never came to supervise the structure as it was being erected by the stonemason he had recommended, Christopher Kempster of Burford.

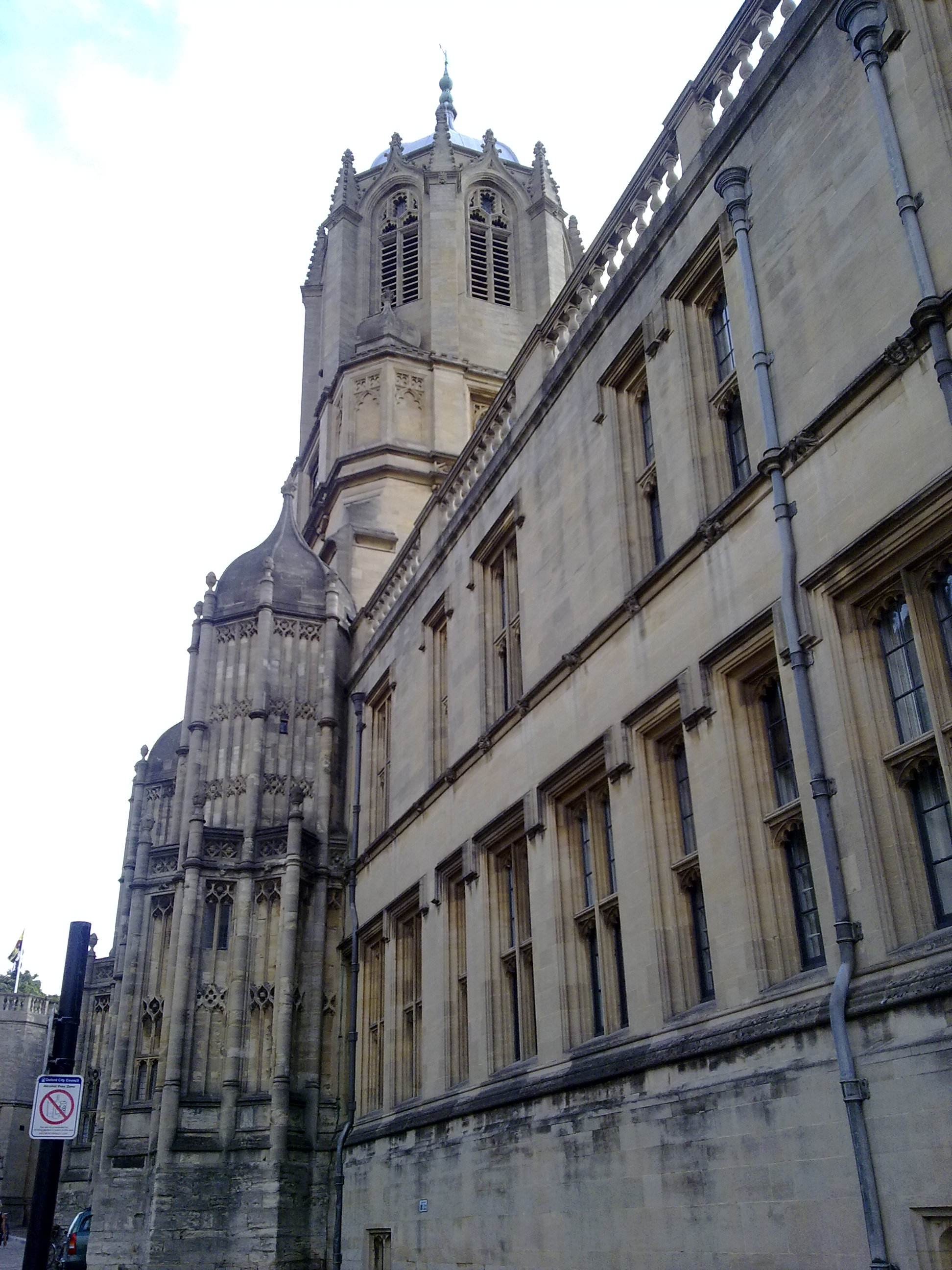
Tom Tower seen from immediately adjacent to the St Aldates entrance to Tom Quad

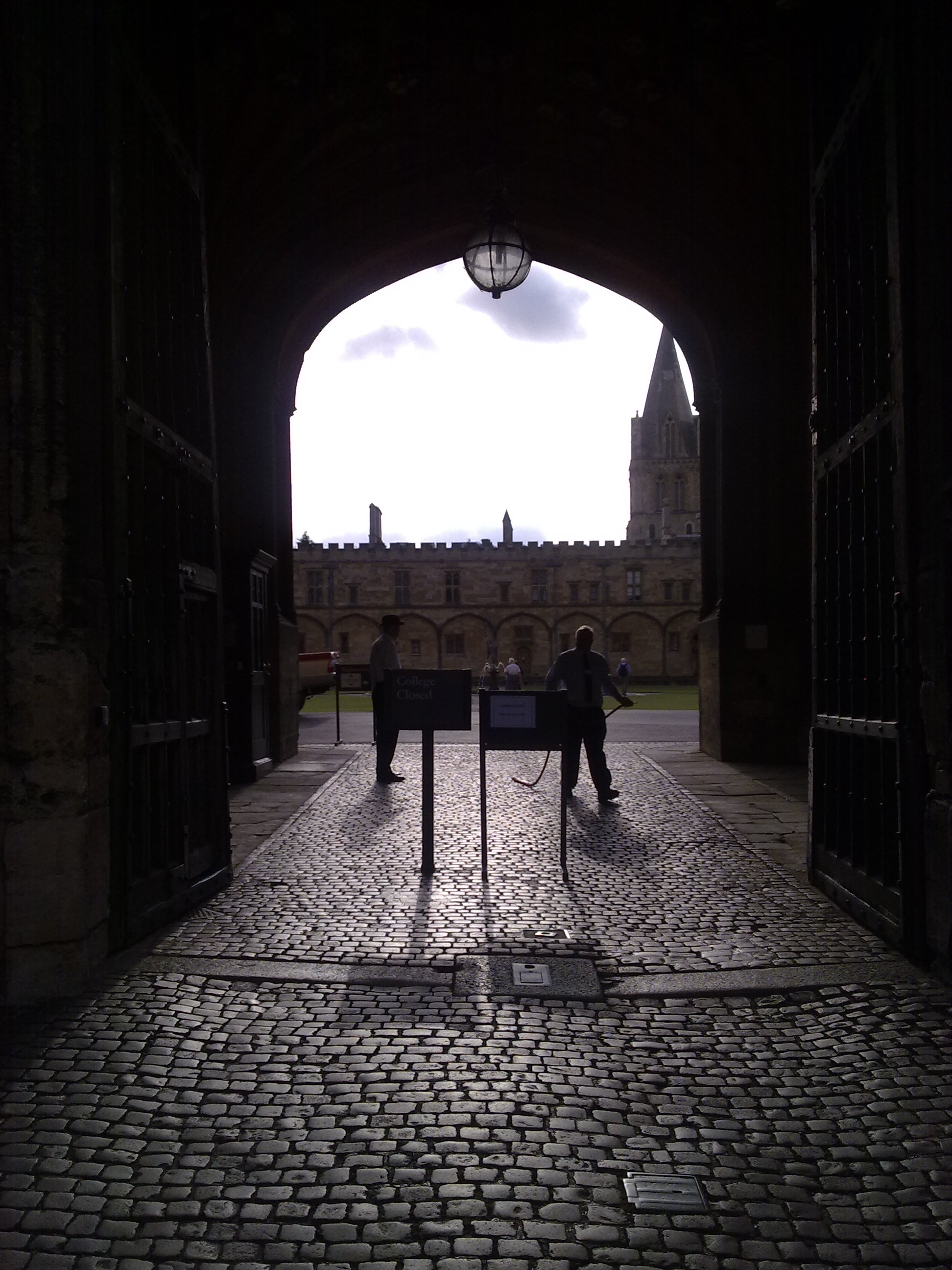
Tom Gate, the main entrance to Christ Church, beneath Tom Tower, looking in towards Tom Quad

In 1732–34, when William Kent was called upon to make sympathetic reconstruction of the east range of Clock Court in Wolsey's Tudor Hampton Court Palace, he naturally turned to the precedent of Tom Tower for his "central ogee dome with its coronet of pilaster-like gothick finials". The tower of Dunster House at Harvard University is a direct imitation of Tom Tower, though its details have been Georgianised, and stones from Christ Church are installed in one of the house's main entryways.

Tom Tower was the inspiration for the Clock Tower (formally the Old Arts Building) at the University of Auckland.

== Great Tom ==
Great Tom, housed in the tower, is the loudest bell in Oxford. It weighs six and a quarter tons and was moved from the 12th-century Osney Abbey after the dissolution of the monasteries. Aside from a student prank in 2002 when the clapper was lagged (enclosed or covered with a material providing insulation), Tom has sounded every night since the Second World War. Originally called "Mary", Great Tom was moved from Osney Abbey to St Frideswide's Priory in 1545, after which at some point it was renamed "Tom". It had caused problems since its first casting, wearing out its clapper, and was recast in 1626 and 1654, but without solving the problem (there is no evidence of a recasting in 1612).

In 1678–79, Richard Keene of Woodstock tried three times to recast the bell, in the process increasing its weight from two to over six tons, but it was not until a final recasting in 1680—by Christopher Hodson, a bell-founder from London—that success was achieved, and the resulting bell, Great Tom, was hung in the newly completed Tom Tower. It was rehung in May 1953. There is an inscription on the bell in Latin, which translated reads:

"Great Thomas the door closer of Oxford renovated April 8, 1680 in the reign of Charles II. Deacon John, the Bishop of Oxford and sub-Deacon give thanks to the knowledge of Henry Smith and the care and workmanship of Christopher Hodson".

Great Tom is still sounded 101 times every night, which signifies the 100 original scholars of the college plus one (added in 1663). It is rung at 21:05 current UK time, which corresponds to 21:00 in what used to be "Oxford time" (local mean time for Oxford, noon in Oxford always occurring five minutes later than noon in Greenwich), and was at one time the signal for all the Oxford colleges to lock their gates. The bell is only rung by swinging on very special occasions. The bell is the subject of a number of Oxfordshire Morris tunes and rounds, including "Old Tom of Oxford" (from Bampton), and the rounds "Great Tom Is Cast" and "Bonny Christ Church Bells", which were composed by the Dean of Christ Church, Henry Aldrich (1647–1710). However, "Great Tom Is Cast" is also credited to Matthew White as having been written in 1667. The two versions are identical except for two notes. Considering the dates, it is likely that White is the real author of the piece.

== Clock ==
A new clock mechanism was installed in 1889 by J. B. Joyce & Co. The main wheel of the striking train was 24 inches (61 cm) in diameter, with the hour hammer weighing 300 pounds (140 kg). The clock was constructed with the double three-legged gravity escapement invented by Lord Grimthorpe. The variations of temperature in the pendulum were obviated by it being constructed of zinc and iron. The pendulum beat was 1½ seconds.

== See also ==
- Magdalen Tower
- Oxford Society of Change Ringers
