= Blue Boar Quadrangle =

Coordinates: 51.7512°N 1.2561°W

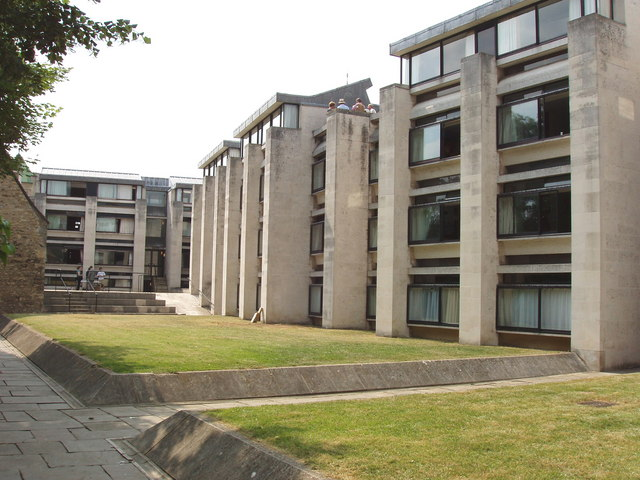
- Blue Boar Quadrangle, Christ Church, Oxford
- Interactive map of Blue Boar Quadrangle
- Location: Oxford, Great Britain

History
- Built: 1965–68

Site notes
- Architect(s): Hidalgo Moya and Philip Powell
- Architectural style: Modern architecture
- Governing body: Christ Church, Oxford

Listed Building
- Criteria: Grade II* listed
- Designated: 2006

The Blue Boar Quadrangle is a mid-century quadrangle within Christ Church, University of Oxford. Designed by Hidalgo Moya and Philip Powell, and built between 1965 and 1968, the quadrangle has been described by Lord McIntosh of Haringey as "one of the best buildings of its kind during the expansion of higher education". Since 17 October 2006, the quadrangle has held the classification of being Grade II* listed, due to the unique nature of its 1960s architecture.

The quadrangle is primarily used to house Christ Church's first year undergraduates. It is located just to the south of the historic Blue Boar Street, off St Aldate's, hence the name. Blue Boar underwent a substantial renovation from 2007 to 2008, resulting in the conversion of all rooms to modern en-suites.

== Usage ==
The quadrangle, which consists of 75 student rooms, 9 small teaching rooms, and 1 senior member set, in Christ Church, Oxford, hosts mainly first years during term time and interviewees and conference guests during the Christmas, Easter and Long Vacations. The accommodation consists of mostly medium-sized rooms with a desk, bed, fridge and window seat, with en-suite facilities. With the large double-glazed windows, the rooms are light.

== Architecture ==
Blue Boar Quadrangle was built on the site of an old car park and garages, next to the narrow, high-walled Blue Boar Street. The quadrangle was designed so that the top floor penthouses provide a broken, set-back series of horizontal planes that help to reduce the scale of the development seen from the street and is constructed almost entirely of characteristic Portland Whitbed and Roach Stone, which adds a unique quality absent from most 1960s developments. The quad itself is an 'L' shape, the rectangular nature being interrupted by the old college brewhouse. The staircases are of four storeys. Staircase four houses a seminar/break-out room and a lecture theatre. The quadrangle is accessed via a new (2007) route which leads from the path between Peckwater and Tom Quads behind Killcanon and brings you straight into the middle of the Blue Boar Quad. This is for students only, but is repeatedly defied by tourists in an attempt to see Oxford students in their 'natural habitat'.

The quadrangle has been described as "One of the best buildings of its kind during the expansion of higher education" by Lord McIntosh of Haringey, Minister for Culture, Media and Sport. The quadrangle has held the classification of Grade II* listed building since 17 October 2006, a status shared by only 20,000 other structures in the country due to the unique nature of its 1960s architecture.

== See also ==
- Tom Quad
- Peckwater Quadrangle
- Meadow Building
- Christ Church Library
