= The Bear, Oxford =

Pub in Oxford, England

The Bear
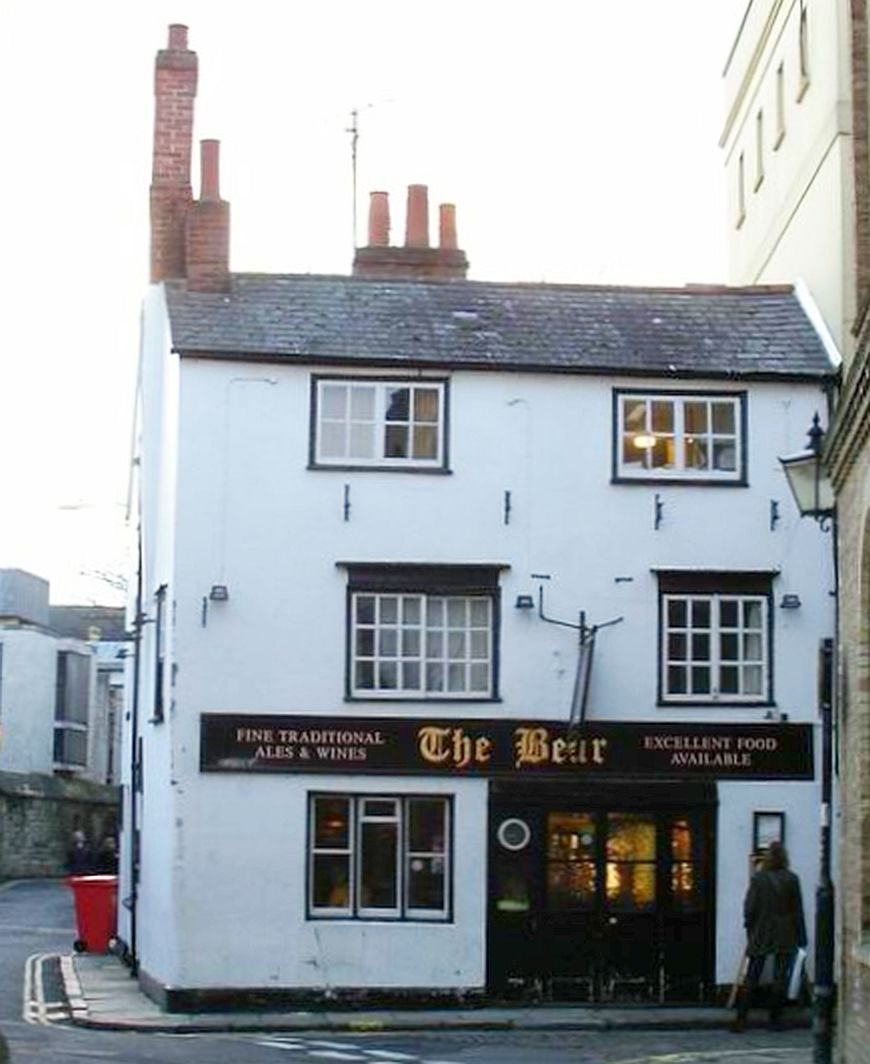
- View of The Bear from Bear Lane

- Location within Oxford city centre

General information
- Location: 6 Alfred Street, Oxford, United Kingdom
- Coordinates: 51°45′05″N 1°15′21″W
- Opened: 1242

Website
- www.bearoxford.co.uk

The Bear (historically associated with The Bear Inn) is a pub in Oxford, England, that was founded in 1774 as The Jolly Trooper. It stands on the corner of Alfred Street and Blue Boar Street, opposite Bear Lane in the centre of Oxford, just north of Christ Church, on the site of St Edward's churchyard. It was converted from the early 17th century residence of the stableman (ostler) for the coaching inn, The Bear Inn, which was on the High Street, Oxford. When The Bear Inn was converted into private housing in 1801, The Jolly Trooper changed its name to The Bear (or The Bear Inn). There is a claim that by adopting its name, the current (1774) Bear Inn has acquired the history of the pub on the High Street, and so is one of the oldest pubs in Oxford.

The documented history of the site of the original Bear Inn on the High Street has been traced to 1241, when Lady Christina Pady bequeathed the property to St Frideswide's Priory in return for having a private mass said for her for eternity; at that time it had a dwelling house, later called Parn Hall, but this burned down in 1421. There is evidence of an inn, Le Tabard, in existence by 1432 in addition to a neighbouring piece of land with shops at the rear. It was known as The Bear Inn by 1457 and by 1523 the land at the rear was part of the pub's property; it contained stables for the coaching horses and was bounded to the south by St Edward's churchyard. In 1524 the priory was closed and the "eternal" masses for Christina Pady ceased; a year later, in 1525, Thomas Wolsey laid the foundations for Christ Church (then called Cardinal College) on the priory's grounds. In the early 17th century a dwelling for the pub stableman was built over St Edward's churchyard, and this dwelling was converted in 1774 to the present day pub, with evidence of skeletons from the churchyard still in the cellar. The Mitchells & Butlers pub, All Bar One on 124 High Street, along with the neighbouring shop, 123, now occupies the site of the original Bear Inn on the High Street.

In 1952 the then landlord of The Bear, Alan Course, started a collection of tie ends; a selection of the over 4,500 ties is on display around the pub. The tie collection was used as part of the plot of Colin Dexter's novel Death Is Now My Neighbour, in which Inspector Morse consults the landlord in order to identify a club tie. The building was grade II listed in January 1954.

== History ==
=== The Bear Inn, High Street ===
On 28 April 1241 Lady Christina Pady, the daughter of Ralph Pady, a burgher (important citizen) and Oxford mill owner, and the widow of both Laurence Kepeharme (died c.1208), the first Mayor of Oxford, and Jordan Rufus (died c. 1241–50), bequeathed to St Frideswide's Priory the land and property on the High Street that would, by 1432, be an inn (Le Tabard). The bequest gave property at the western corner of High Street and Alfred Street, and property to the south near the corner of Alfred Street and Blue Boar Street, which in total amounted to one messuage (a dwelling house with outbuildings) and four "seldis" (booths or shops), to the priory in return for the canons saying a mass for her for eternity, though Christina Pady retained the right to live in and benefit from the properties while she lived. In 1277, a Thomas Pope, with his wife and son, were given the tenancy of Parn Hall (Pirnehalle) – the messuage on the High Street – for the rest of their lives for a sum of two marks per year, with a deposit of 30 marks. It is thought that the two properties bequeathed by Christina Pady (the dwelling house on the High Street and the four shops on Alfred Street) were joined at some point and formed the yard and buildings of what became The Bear Inn. The original building, Parn Hall, burnt down in 1421.

In 1432 there is mention of an inn known as Le Tabard being leased to John and Joan Berford. It was known as The Bear Inn by 1457, and a transfer of tenancy from Robert Mychegood to Henry Stanley took place in 1522. A lease dating from 1523 states that grounds of The Bear Inn were bounded on the south by the cemetery of St Edward's Church, which lay where the present pub, The Bear, stands. The 17th century antiquarian Anthony Wood, in his Survey of the Antiquities of the City of Oxford (1661–66), mentions that during the time of Henry VIII (the first half of the 16th century), the landlord was Furres and the place was known (perhaps informally) as "Furres Inne".

The property of St Frideswide's Priory was acquired by Thomas Wolsey (also known as Cardinal Wolsey, chief advisor to Henry VIII, his Lord Chancellor, and the Archbishop of York ). Wolsey closed down the priory (ending Christina Pady's perpetual masses), and built Cardinal College (now Christ Church) on the grounds. Following Wolsey's fall from grace in 1539, the land was taken over by Henry VIII, who, in 1545, sold parts of the property, including 123 and 124 High Street, to one of his courtiers Richard Taverner and his younger brother Roger.

Richard Edes, an Elizabethan poet, playwright and clergyman, in his Latin poem Iter Boreale, records the proprietor of The Bear Inn in 1583 as a Matthew Harrison, who had a pet bear named Furze (considered to be possibly a reference to the previous landlord, Furres). The inn was fashionable in the 17th century, when judges and royal commissioners were among the patrons. The heir to the throne in Denmark visited in 1652. In the 18th century, the inn served as the depot for the "Oxford Machine" stage coach, which carried passengers to London for a fare of 10 shillings.

The Bear Inn closed in 1801; after which the building was sold and divided into two. At the time there were over thirty bedrooms, with stabling for a similar number of horses. The Mitchells & Butlers pub, All Bar One on 124 High Street, along with the neighbouring shop, 123, now occupies the site of The Bear Inn on the High Street.

=== The Bear, Alfred Street ===
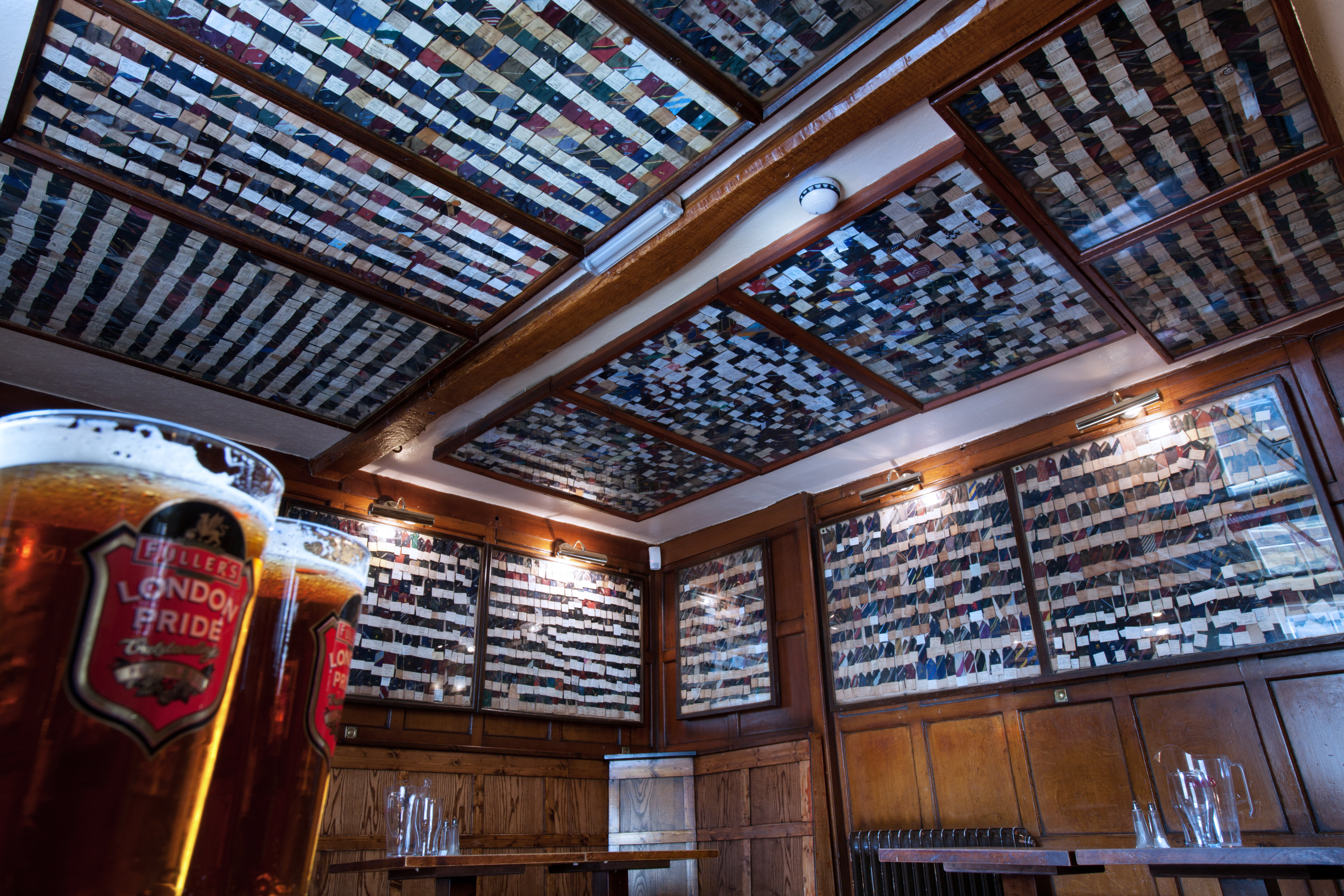
Some of the cut-off ends of neckties displayed at The Bear, 2010

The building on the corner of Blue Boar Street and Alfred Street, which now houses The Bear, was built in the early 17th century as the residence for the coaching inn's ostler. It was converted into a tavern, The Jolly Trooper, in 1774. When The Bear Inn's premises on the High Street were rebuilt and converted into private housing in 1801, its business name transferred to the Jolly Trooper. The land on which the present building was constructed was the churchyard of St Edward's church from c. 1122 to 1388; in 2018, human bones were found in the cellar which belonged to several bodies which had been buried in the churchyard.

A distinctive feature of the Bear is a collection of over 4,500 snippets of club ties, started in 1952 by the landlord, Alan Course, who had worked as a cartoonist at the Oxford Mail. Tie ends were clipped with a pair of scissors in exchange for half a pint of beer. These were originally pinned to the wall, and are now displayed in glass-fronted cases on the walls and even the (low) ceiling. The ties mostly indicate membership of a variety of institutions, such as clubs, sports teams, schools and colleges.

The building was Class II listed in January 1954, noting that the building is "Probably C17 but has been altered and modernised", and that it is timber framed, externally covered in stucco, though with some original frame work visible internally at the top of the staircase.

== In popular culture ==
In Robert Boris's 1984 comedy movie Oxford Blues, The Bear is where the main character, Nick Di Angelo, and his student friends occasionally meet to drink. In Colin Dexter's novel Death Is Now My Neighbour, Inspector Morse seeks the aid of the pub's landlords (and tie experts), Steve and Sonya Lowbridge, in identifying a tie from a photograph. Oxford-educated Australian arts leader Anthony Steel recalls in his autobiography, Painful in Daily Doses: An Anecdotal Memoir, that Alan Course, the landlord, played the Last Post on his bugle, for a student lying in the middle of the street outside the pub.

== See also ==
- Bear Inn
