= Bear Inn =

Bear Inn may refer to:

- Bear Inn, a popular Pub name
- Bear Inn, Cowbridge, Wales
- The Bear, Oxford, England - historically associated with The Bear Inn, Oxford
