= John Massey (priest) =

English clergyman

John Massey (1651–1716) was an English clergyman and academic administrator at the University of Oxford.

Masey was born in Bristol and educated at Magdalen College, Oxford. In 1672 he became a Fellow of Merton College, Oxford. He was Proctor of Oxford University from 1684 to 1686; and Dean (head) of Christ Church, Oxford from 1686 to 1688. In later life he became a Roman Catholic.

| Preceded by John Fell | Dean of Christ Church, Oxford; 1686–1688 | Succeeded by Henry Aldrich |
