= Alfred Street =

Street in central Oxford, England

Coordinates: 51.7519°N 1.2558°W

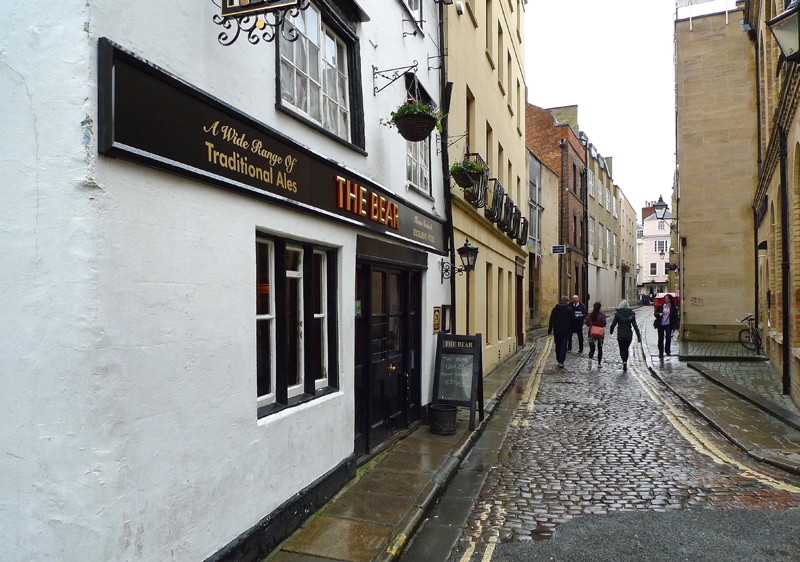
View looking north along Alfred Street with The Bear public house on the left

Alfred Street is a cobbled street running between the High Street to the north and the junction with Blue Boar Street and Bear Lane at the southern end, in central Oxford, England. To the south is Christ Church, one of Oxford University's historic colleges.

The Bear is a historic public house located on the west side of Alfred Street at the southern end. A unique feature is a large collection of ties displayed on its walls and ceiling.

== History ==
Alfred Street was named Venella Sancti Edwardi in 1220. The name was taken from St Edward's Church, which was on the west side of the street, but was destroyed around 1500. In the 16th century, the street was known as Vine Hall Street. This name is derived from Vine Hall, located near the rear of Christ Church.

In the 17th–18th centuries, the name Bear Lane was used, after the Bear inn in the street. Nowadays, this name is used for the lane from the southern end of Alfred Street to the east. The origin of the current name, which has been used since at least the middle of the 19th century, is not known, but may mean King Alfred, the purported founder of University College, Oxford for many years.

During the 19th century, it was host to the Oxford Gymnasium, designed by William Wilkinson and built in 1859 for Archibald MacLaren, an early physical education pioneer. The gymnasium was used by William Morris and other prominent Oxford residents of the day. The building was later converted to a press by the Holywell Press and is now Blue Boar Court.

A real tennis court used to be located off Alfred Street. Other real tennis courts in Oxford were located off Oriel Square and (still extant) off Merton Street.

In 1916, St Columba's United Reformed Church was built in the street following the Gothic style. It was designed by T. Phillips Figgis. A new front and lobby were added in 1960, designed by Brian Smith.

Pusey Street, also in central Oxford to the north, was formerly called Alfred Street, but was renamed to avoid confusion in the 1920s.

== Bibliography ==
- Hibbert, Christopher, ed. (1988). "Alfred Street". The Encyclopaedia of Oxford. Macmillan. ISBN 0-333-39917-X.
