= Quadrangle (architecture) =

Open space or courtyard between buildings

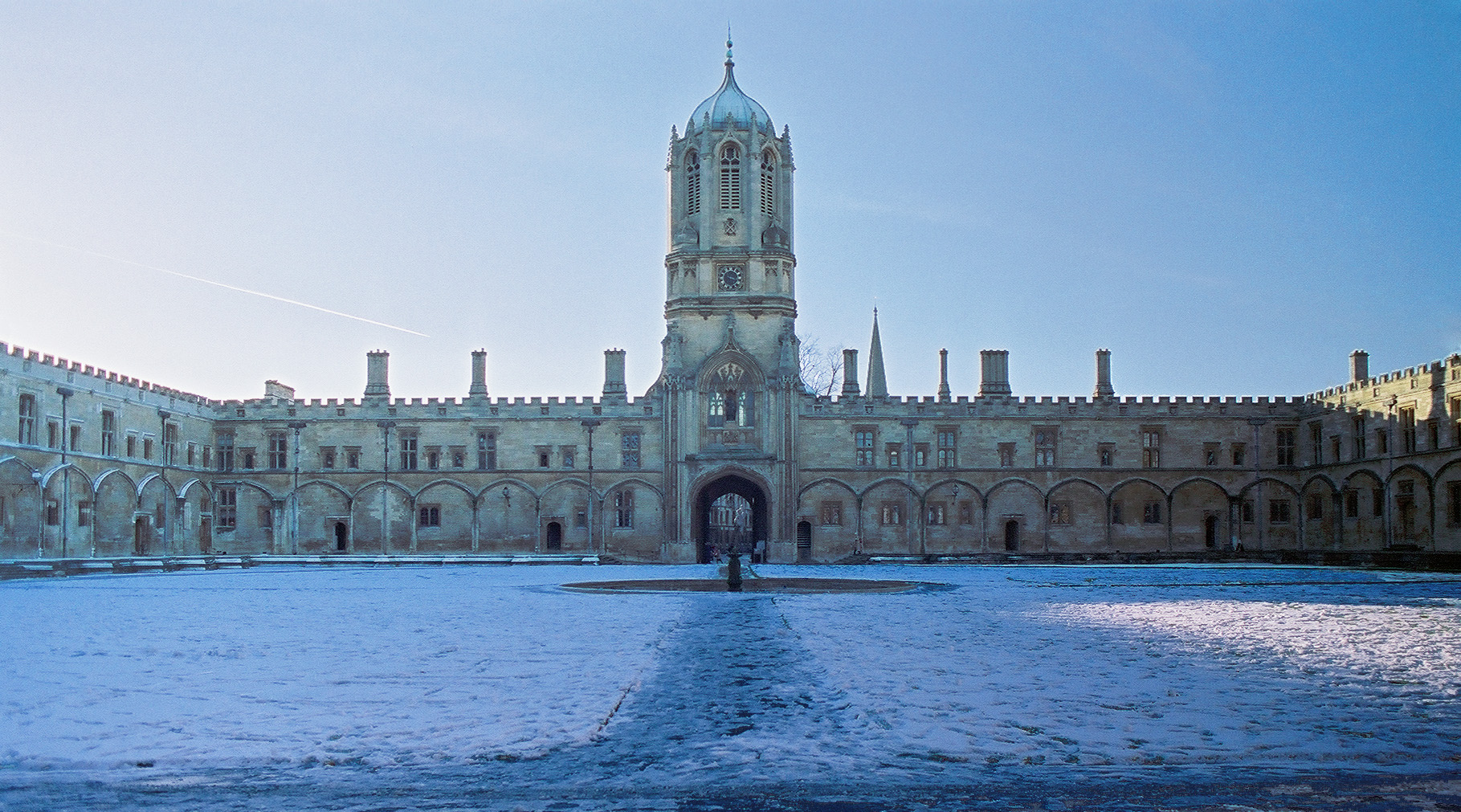
Tom Quad, Christ Church, Oxford

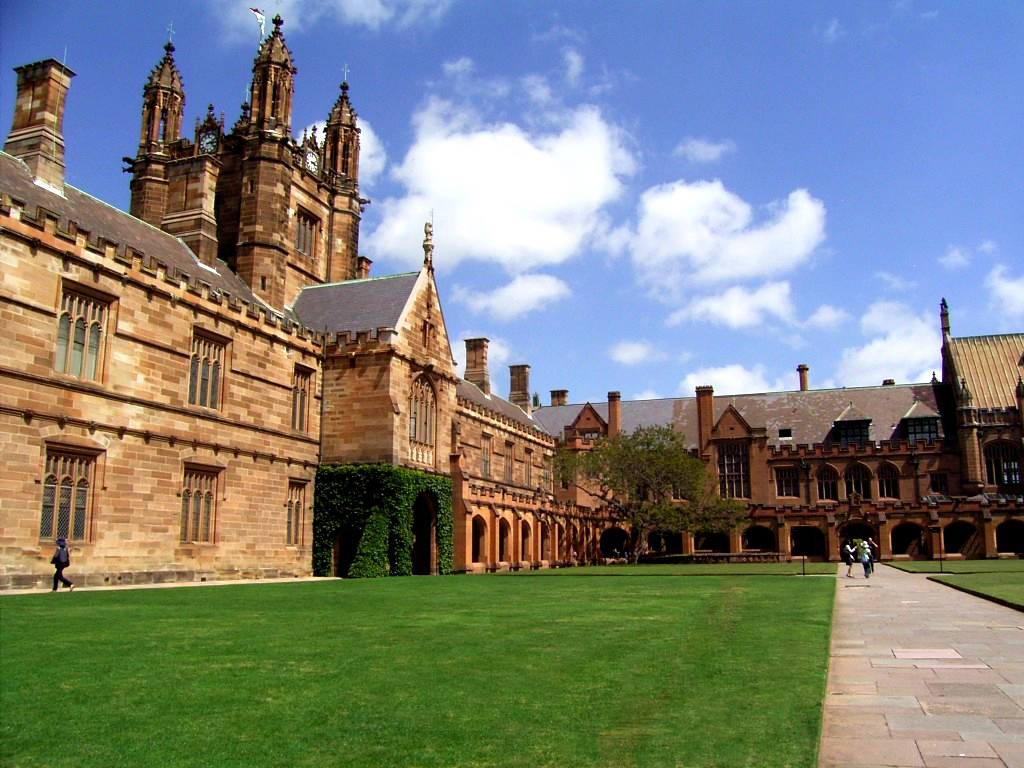
Quadrangle of the University of Sydney

In architecture, a quadrangle (or colloquially, a quad) is a space or a courtyard, usually rectangular (square or oblong) in plan, the sides of which are entirely or mainly occupied by parts of a large building (or several smaller buildings). The word is probably most closely associated with college or university campus architecture, but quadrangles are also found in other buildings such as palaces. Most quadrangles are open-air, though a few have been roofed over (often with glass), to provide additional space for social meeting areas or coffee shops for students.

The word quadrangle was originally synonymous with quadrilateral, but this usage is now relatively uncommon.

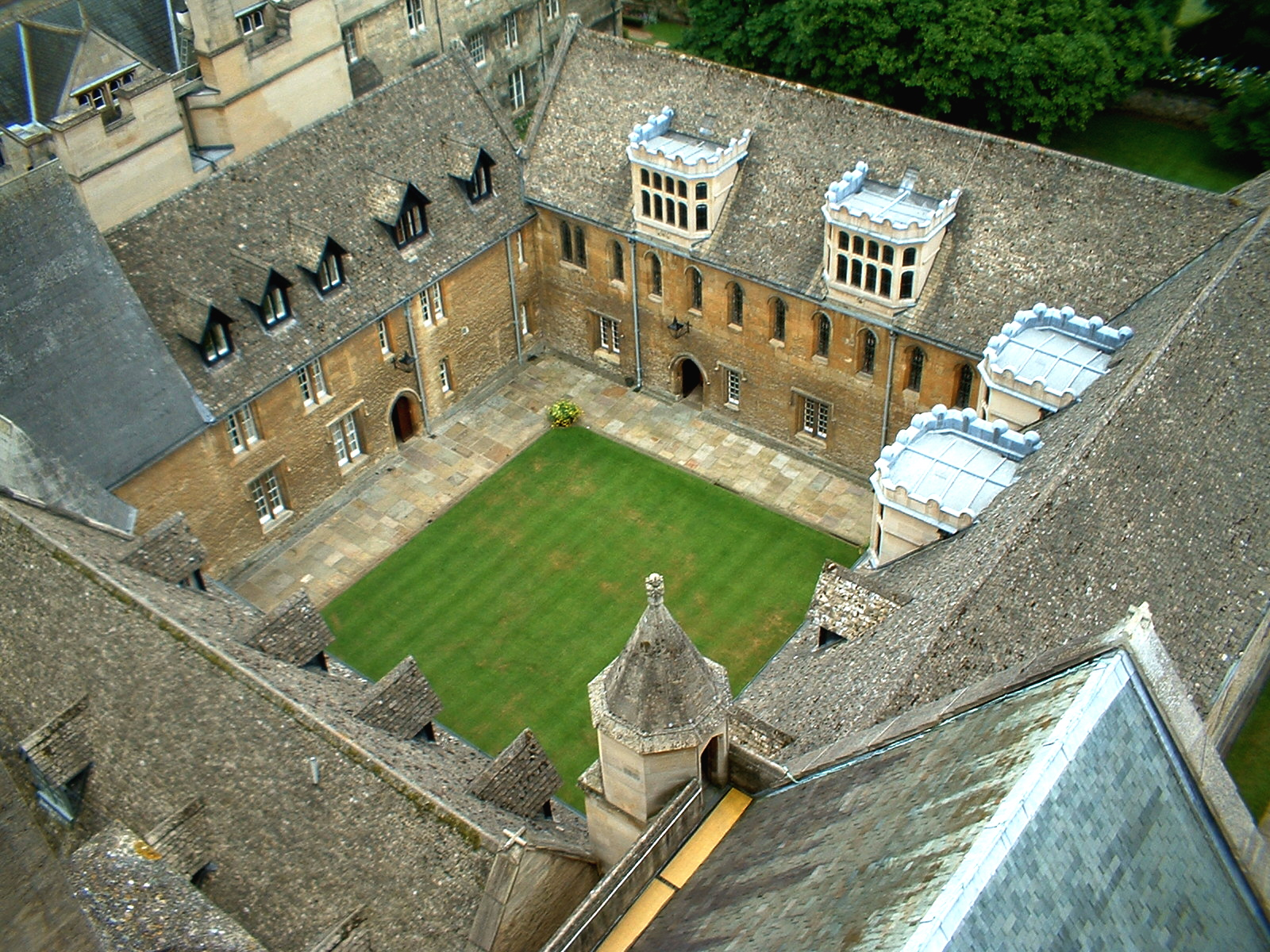
Mob Quad, Merton College, Oxford is often claimed to be the oldest university quadrangle

Some modern quadrangles resemble cloister gardens of medieval monasteries, called garths, which were usually square or rectangular, enclosed by covered arcades or cloisters. However, it is clear from the oldest examples (such as Mob Quad) which are plain and unadorned with arcades, that the medieval colleges at Oxford and Cambridge were creating practical accommodation for college members. Grander quadrangles that look like cloisters came later, once the idea of a college was well established and benefactors or founders wished to create more monumental buildings. Although architectonically analogous, for historical reasons quads in the colleges of the University of Cambridge are always referred to as courts (such as the Trinity Great Court).

In North America, Thomas Jefferson's design for the University of Virginia centered the housing and academic buildings in a Palladian form around three sides of the Lawn, a huge grassy expanse. Later, some American college and university planners imitated the Jeffersonian plan, the Oxbridge idea, Beaux-Arts forms, and other models. All five barracks at The Citadel (military college) feature quadrangles with red-and-white squares (the colors of the South Carolina battle flag), which are used for formations by the Corps of Cadets.

Quadrangles are also found in traditional Kerala houses (Naalukettu) and is known as the Nadumittam ("Middle Space").

== Notable quadrangles ==
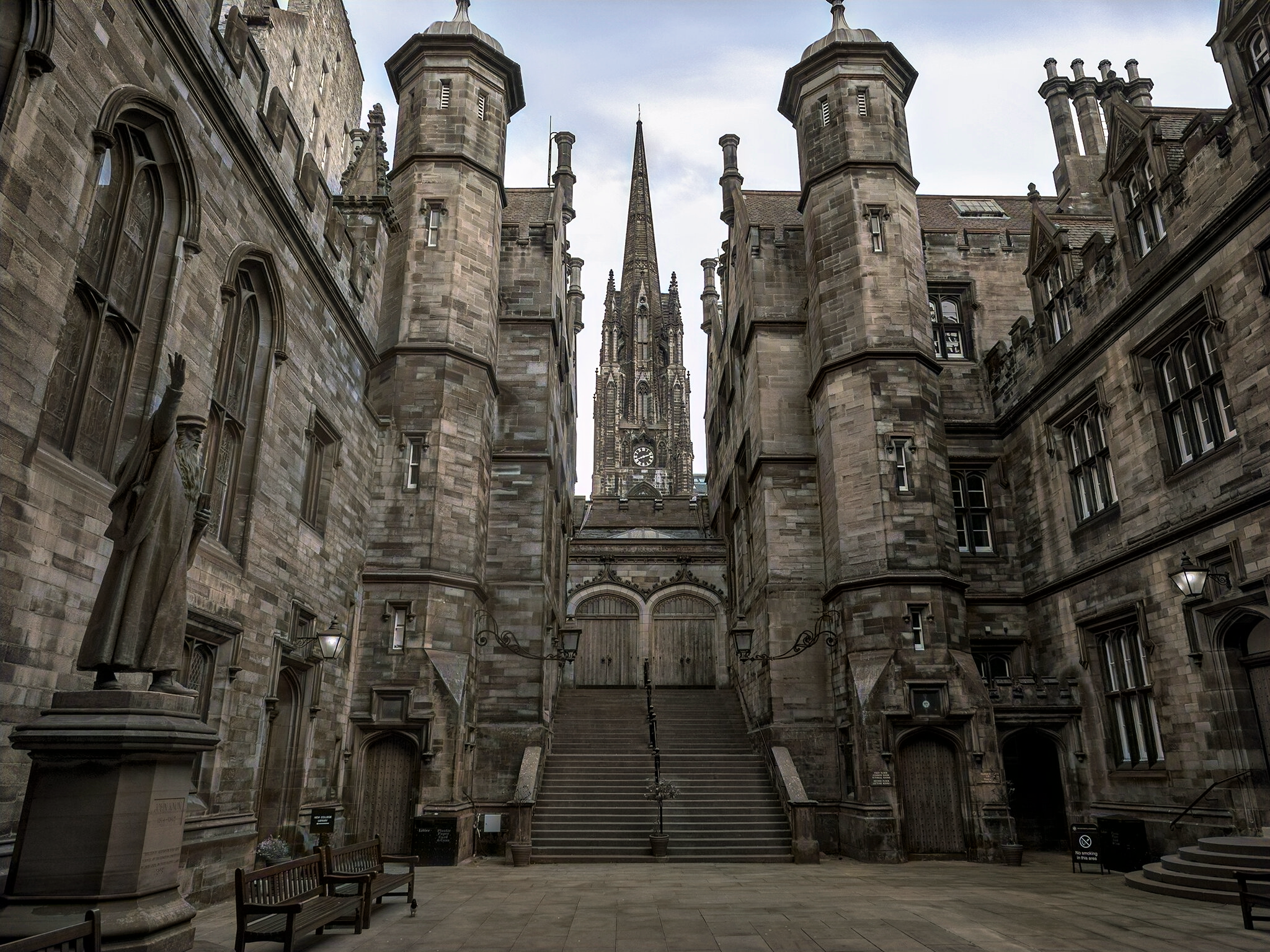
Quadrangle of New College, Edinburgh

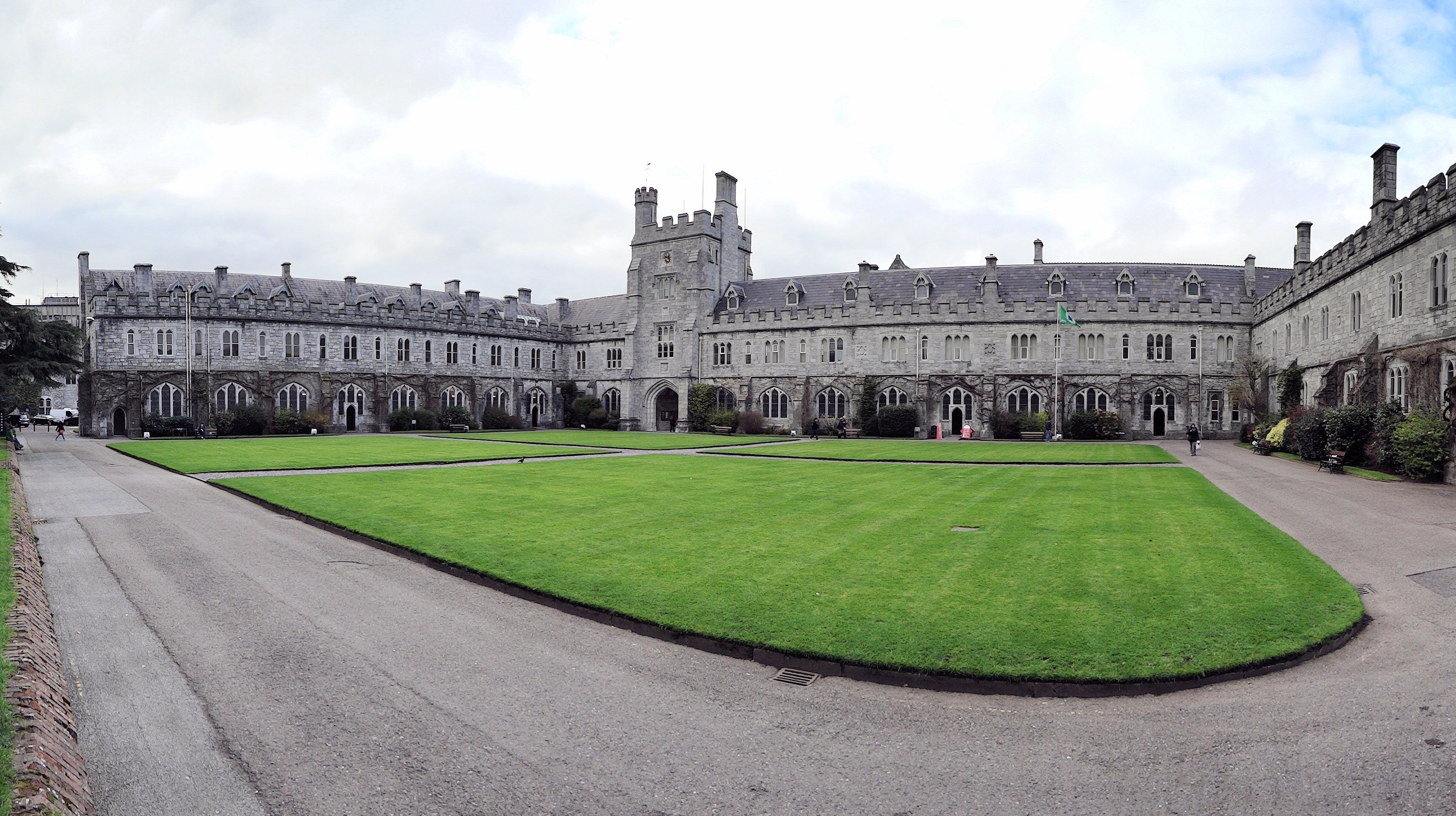
University College Cork quadrangle

Quadrangle of S. Thomas' College, Mount Lavinia

- Woodburn Circle, West Virginia University
- Main Quad, University of Illinois Urbana-Champaign
- Blue Boar Quadrangle, Christ Church, Oxford
- Francis Quadrangle, University of Missouri
- Memorial Quadrangle, Yale University
- Mob Quad, Merton College, Oxford is one of the oldest quads in existence.
- Peckwater Quadrangle, Christ Church, Oxford
- Killian Court, Massachusetts Institute of Technology
- The Quad, Harvard University
- Harvard Yard, Harvard University
- Queen's Lawn, Imperial College London
- The Green, Dartmouth College
- King's College Quad, University of Aberdeen
- The Quadrangle, Springfield, Massachusetts
- Radcliffe Quadrangle, University College, Oxford
- Schenley Quadrangle, University of Pittsburgh
- Bascom Hill, University of Wisconsin–Madison
- Tom Quad, Christ Church, Oxford University
- University of Alabama Quad
- The Quad, University College London
- Founder's Building, Royal Holloway College, London
- The Diag, University of Michigan
- Sunken Garden, College of William & Mary
- The Lawn, University of Virginia
- McKeldin Mall, University of Maryland
- Old College, University of Edinburgh
- New College, University of Edinburgh
- Holyrood Quad, Moray House, Edinburgh
- Dahlgren Quadrangle, Georgetown University
- Old Campus, Yale University
- Main Quad, Stanford University
- Law Quadrangle, University of Michigan
- UVic Quad, University of Victoria
- Liberal Arts Quadrangle, University of Washington
- West Chester State College Quadrangle Historic District, West Chester University
- The Quadrangle, University of Pennsylvania
- El Cuadrángulo, University of Puerto Rico, Río Piedras
- Whitworth Hall Quadrangle, University of Manchester
- Hearn Plaza, Wake Forest University
- Quadrangle, S.Thomas' College, Mount Lavinia

== See also ==
- Siheyuan – Historical type of residence in China
- Nālukettu – Traditional housing style in Kerala
- Haveli, a form of classical architecture from South Asia & Persia, which incorporates a quad for cooling ventilation in the hot climate, and the private enjoyment of the open sky by residents, in a very modest culture
