= Christ Church Library =

University library in Oxford, England

Coordinates: 51.7510°N 1.2549°W

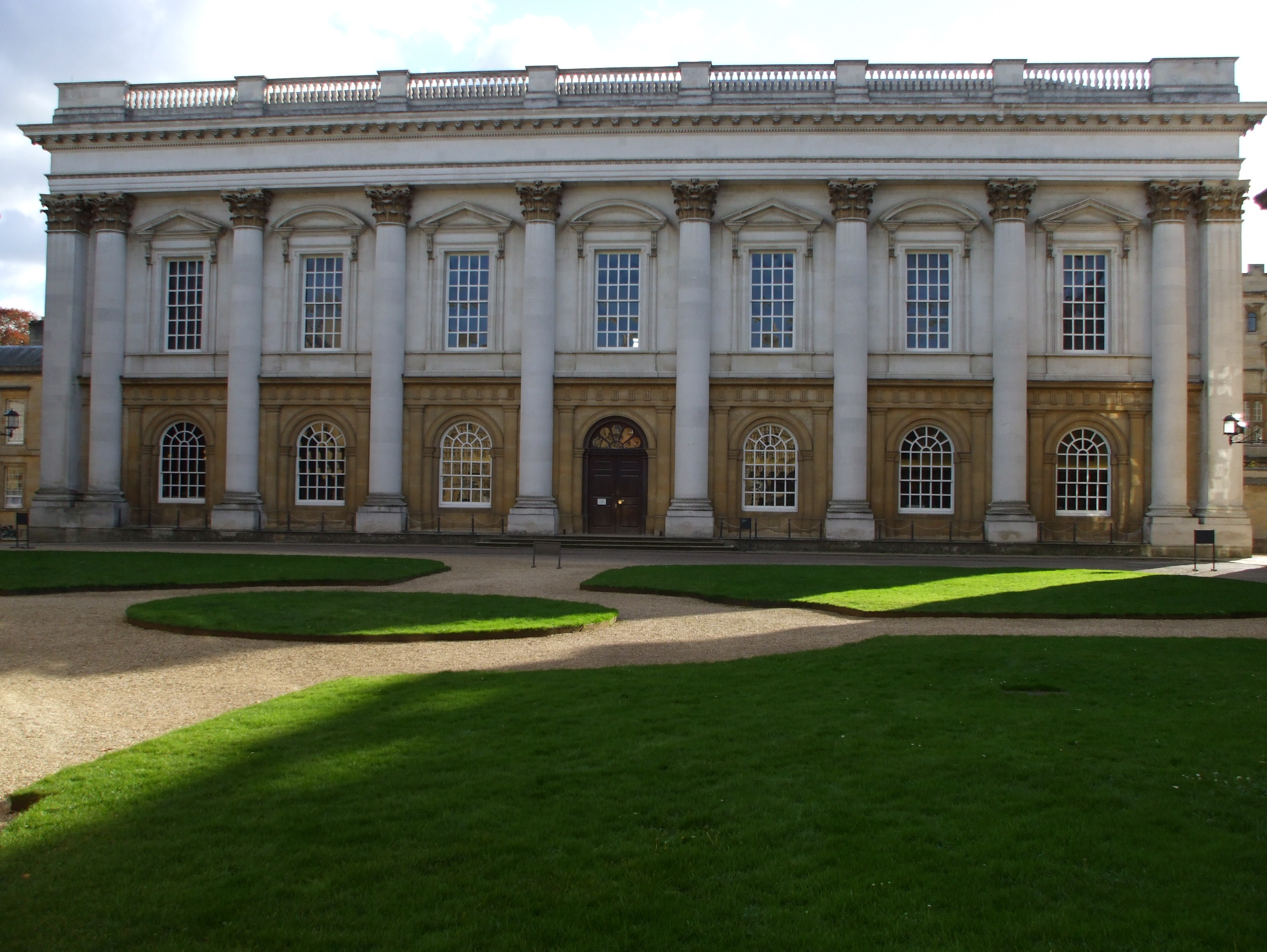
Christ Church Library.

Christ Church Library is a Georgian building that forms the south side of Peckwater Quadrangle in Christ Church, Oxford, England. To the east is Canterbury Quadrangle. The library houses the college's modern lending library and early printed books on two floors.

== History ==
The first library at Christ Church was established in 1562 in what had been the refectory of St Frideswide's Priory. The books, of which around 140 remain in the library, were originally chained to wooden lecterns.

A new library was designed in the eighteenth century, with the intention of attracting aristocratic students to the college by equalling the great classical library buildings of Trinity College, Cambridge and Trinity College, Dublin. The most likely candidate for the architect is Dr George Clarke of All Souls; the master mason was William Townsend/Townesend. Building work started in 1717 and was only completed in 1772.

The books were housed on the first floor to avoid damp and flooding, while the ground floor was designed as an open loggia. However, a bequest of paintings from General John Guise during the protracted construction of the library led to the enclosure of the ground floor to display them. The Christ Church Picture Gallery has since moved to a separate, modernist, building.

The front elevation and plan.

The collections incorporate substantial bequests of books from, amongst others, Robert Burton; Henry Aldrich, Dean of Christ Church; William Stratford, a canon of the cathedral; William Wake, Archbishop of Canterbury; and Charles Boyle, 4th Earl of Orrery.

== Collections ==
Christ Church Library contains one of the largest collections of early printed books in Oxford outside the Bodleian Library. The library was described in 1946 as 'a heterogeneous collection of about 100,000 works' and this is the figure which has generally been quoted since. For comparison, the modern collection holds around 72,000 books as of 2006.

== Exhibitions ==
The library also hosts exhibitions; these have ranged from the art and photography of Lewis Carroll (curated by Edward Wakeling, Allan Chapman, Janet McMullin and Cristina Neagu) to a commemoration of Johann Joachim Winckelmann (curated by Amy Smith, Katherine Harloe and Cristina Neagu).

== Bibliography ==
- Christ Church Library. Books and articles about the Library
