= Blue Boar Street =

Street in central Oxford, England

Coordinates: 51.7513°N 1.2563°W

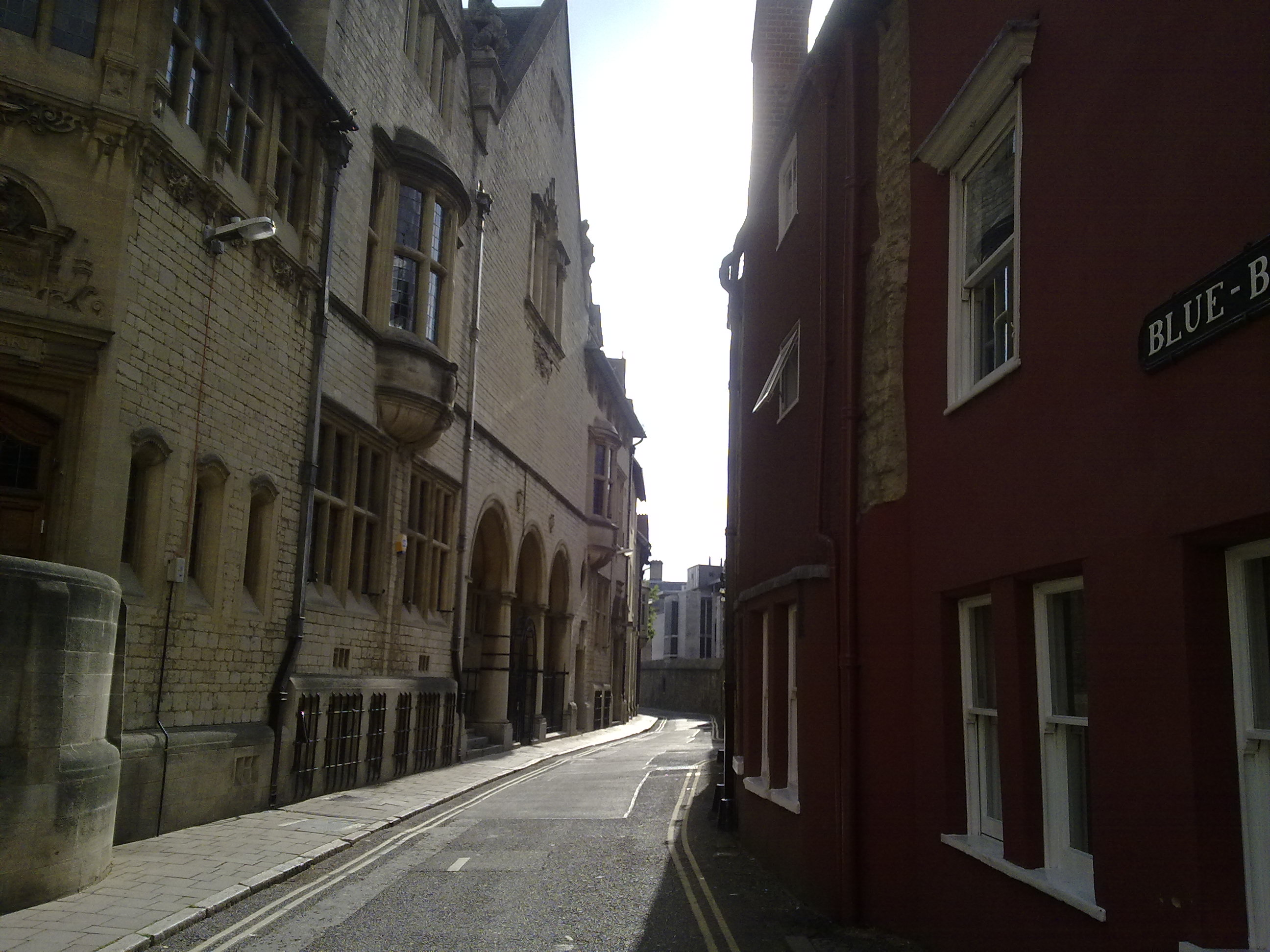
The St Aldate's Street entrance to Blue Boar Street, with the Oxford Town Hall and the entrance to the Museum of Oxford on the left.

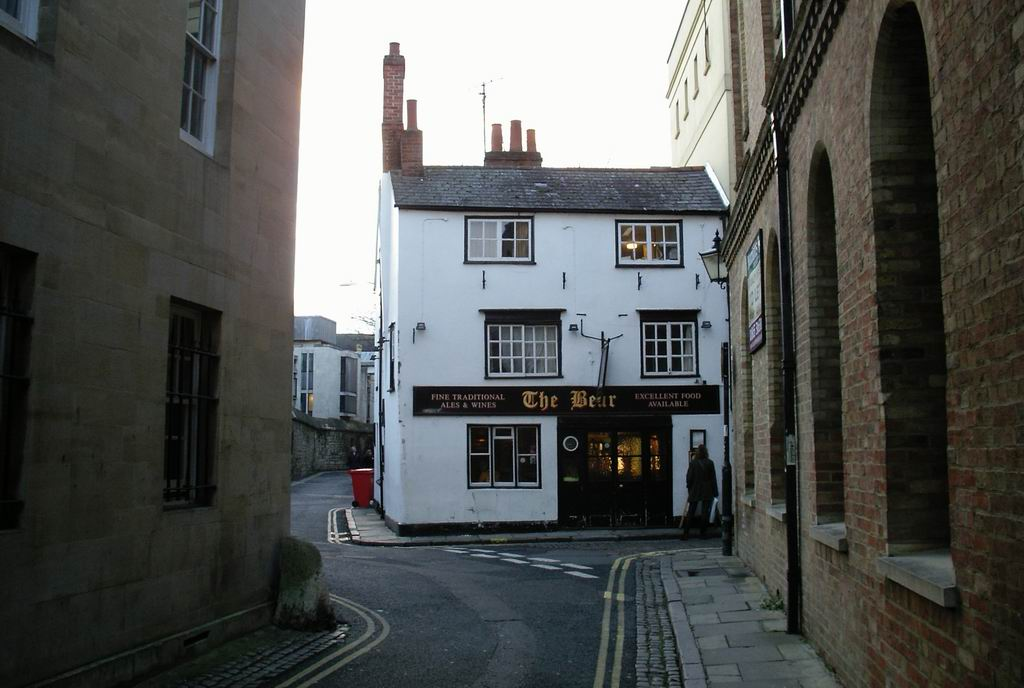
The Bear public house, on the corner of Blue Boar Street and Alfred Street.

Blue Boar Street is a narrow historic street running between St Aldate's to the west and the southern end of Alfred Street to the east, in central Oxford, England. It is located just north of Christ Church.

At the western end is the Museum of Oxford and the Town Hall to the north.

The Bear is a historic public house located on the north side of Blue Boar Street on the corner with Alfred Street. A unique feature is a large collection of short lengths of tie displayed on its walls and ceiling.

To the south is Christ Church, one of the largest Oxford colleges. Behind an old wall on Blue Boar Street are the modern 1960s buildings of the Blue Boar Quadrangle in the college, named after Blue Boar Street. In 2006, this was Grade II* listed.

The street was formerly known as Tresham('s) Lane. Blewebore Inn, once owned by King Henry III, was located here, hence the current name. The Blue Boar Inn was demolished in 1893 for the building of the Oxford Public Library, later the Museum of Oxford.
