= Henry Aldrich =

English academic, architect and composer (1648–1710)

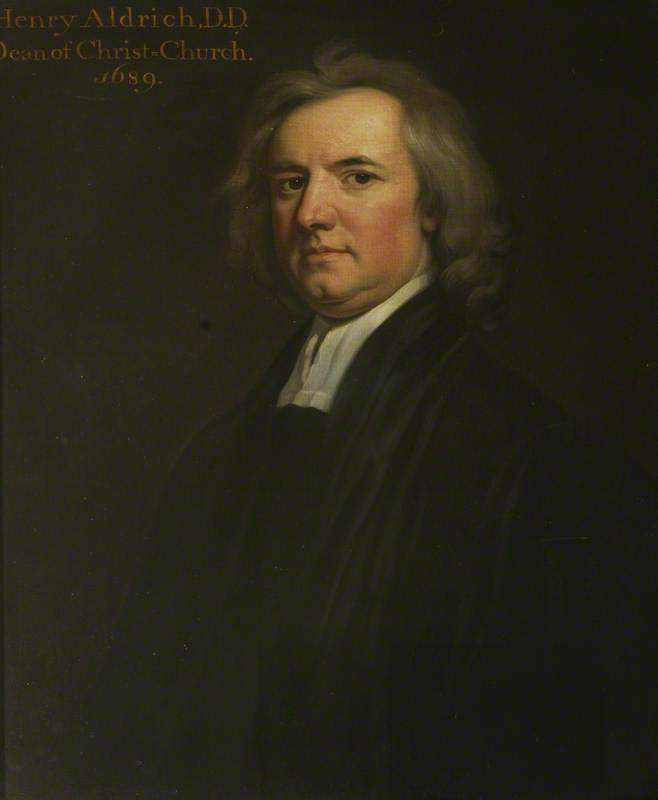
Henry Aldrich (circa 1689)

Henry Aldrich (15 January 1648 – 14 December 1710) was an English scholar, clergyman, architect, and composer.

== Life ==
Aldrich was educated at Westminster School under Dr Richard Busby. In 1662, he entered Christ Church, Oxford, and in 1689 was made Dean in succession to the Roman Catholic John Massey, who had fled to the Continent. In 1692, he became Vice-Chancellor of the University of Oxford until 1695. In 1702, he was appointed Rector of Wem in Shropshire, but continued to reside at Oxford, where he died on 14 December 1710. He was buried in Christ Church Cathedral without any memorial, at his own request. However, a medallion portrait memorial was erected to his memory in 1732 in Oxford Cathedral sculpted by Henry Cheere.

== Works ==
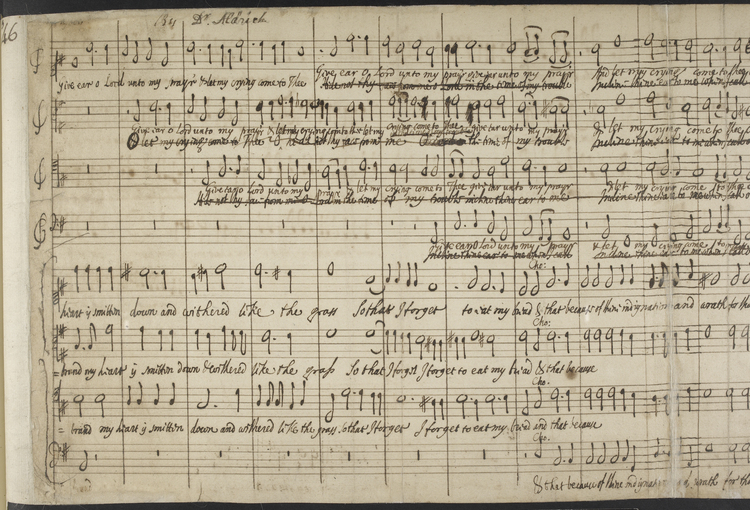
A folio from Give ear, O Lord by Aldrich, written in his own hand.

Henry Aldrich was a man of unusually varied gifts. A classical scholar of fair merits, he is best known as the author of a little book on logic (Artis Logicæ Compendium). Although not innovative in the field of Logic itself (it closely follows Peter of Spain's Summulae Logicales), its insistent use by generations of Oxford students has shown it to be of great synthetic and didactic value: the Compendium continued to be read at Oxford (in Mansel's revised edition) until long past the middle of the 19th century.

“Aldrich also composed several anthems and church services, and adapted music by Palestrina and Carissimi to English words. Contemporary accounts praised his adaptations, and he is credited with the catch ‘Hark, the bonny Christ Church bells."

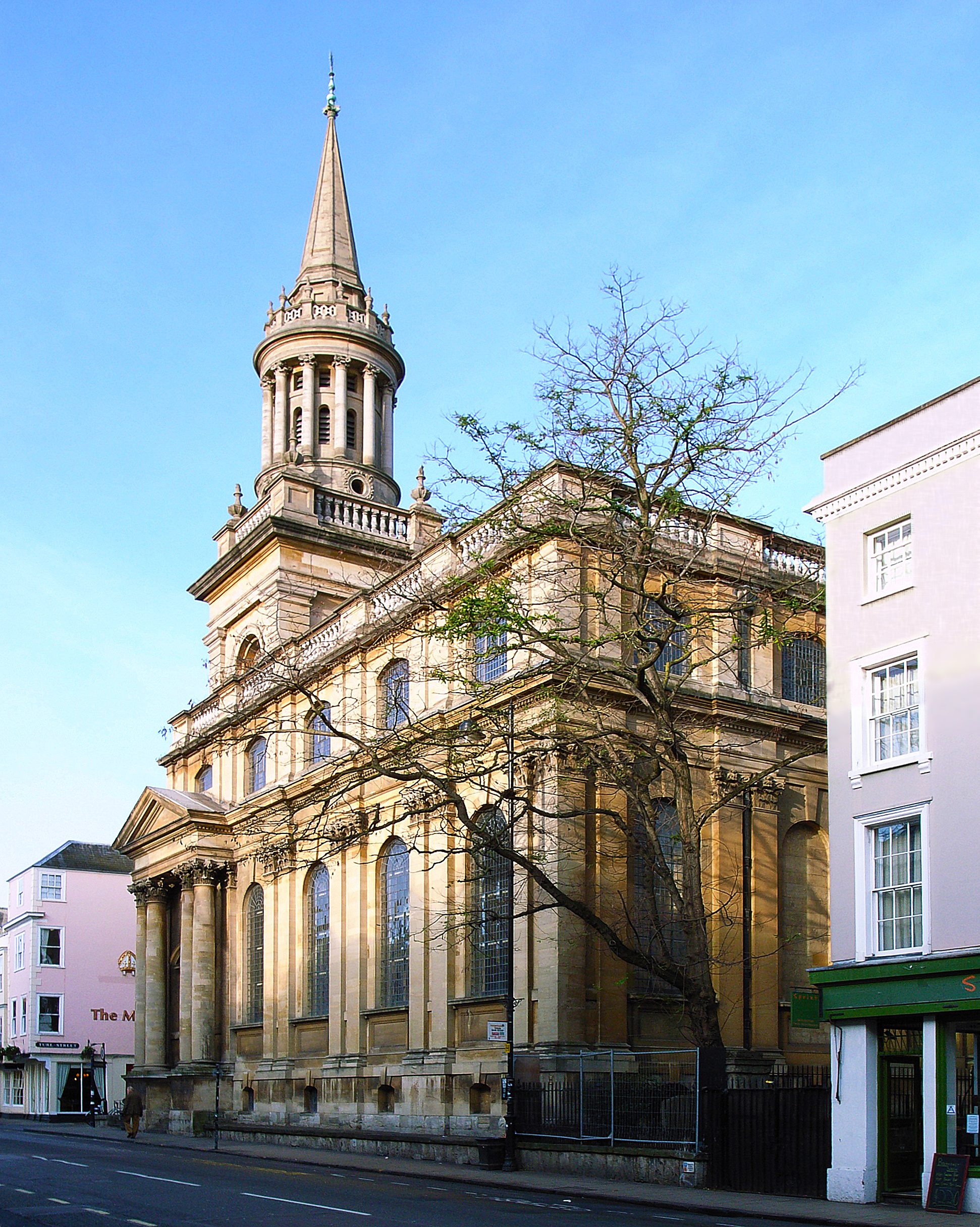
All Saints Church on the north side of the High Street, designed by Henry Aldrich and completed in 1720.

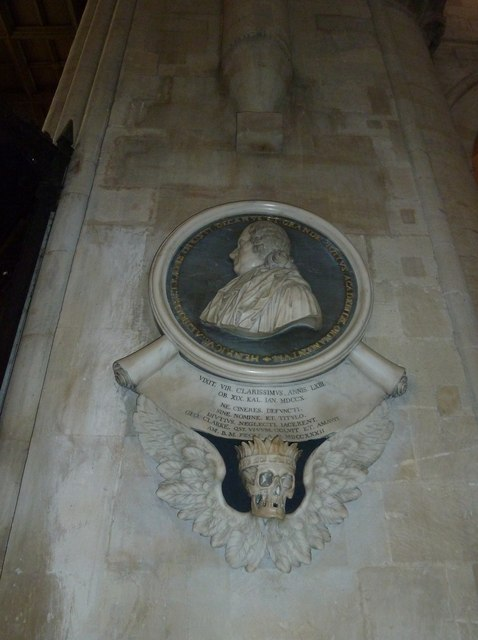
Oxford's Christ Church Cathedral, memorial to Henry Aldrich

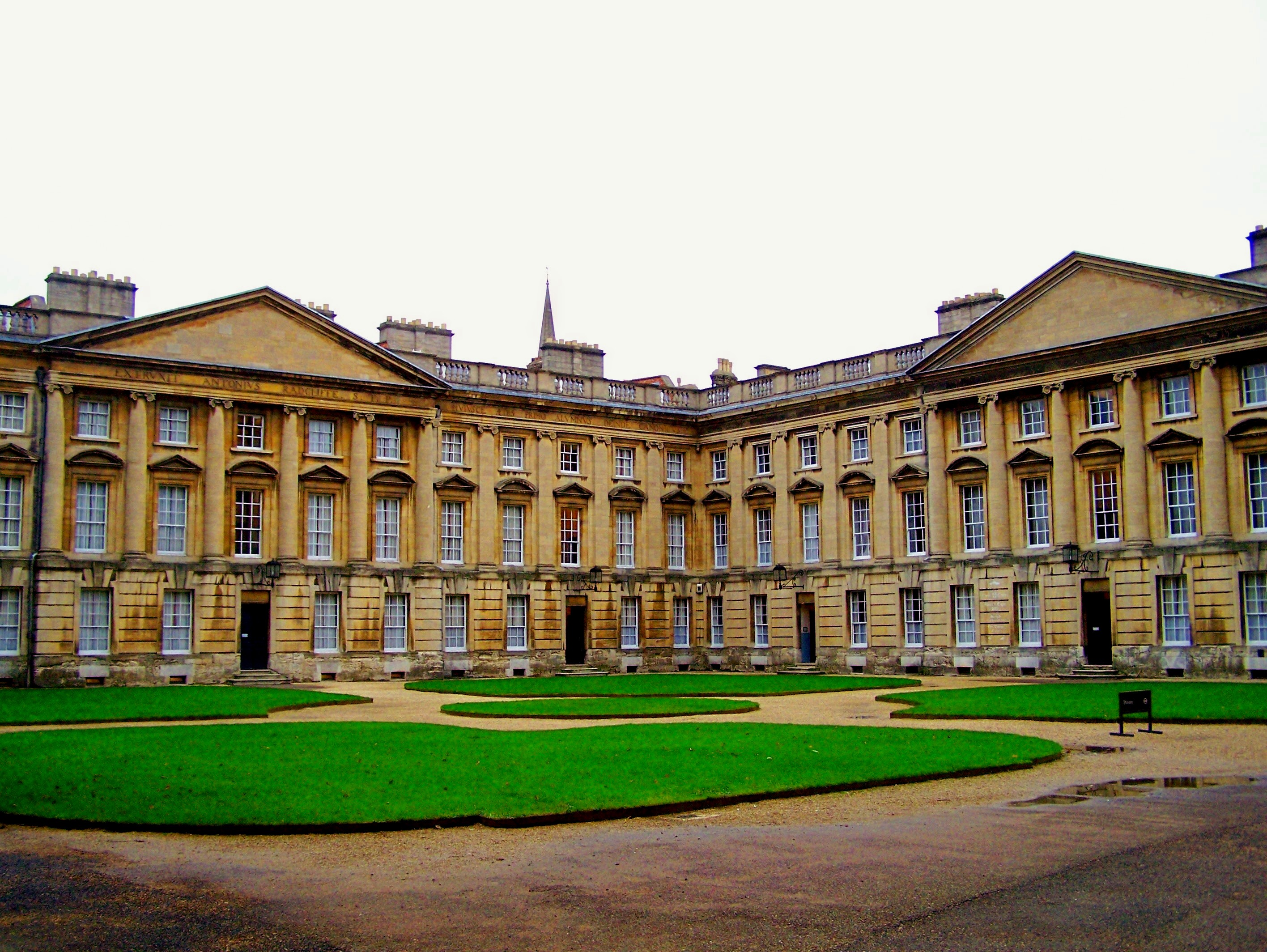
Peckwater Quadrangle of Christ Church, Oxford, designed by Henry Aldrich.

Evidence of his skill as an architect may be seen in the church and campanile of All Saints Church, Oxford, and in three sides of the so-called Peckwater Quadrangle of Christ Church, which were erected after his designs. He bore a great reputation for conviviality', and wrote a humorous Latin version of the popular ballad A soldier and a sailor, A tinker and a tailor, etc.

Another specimen of his wit is furnished by the following epigram of the five reasons for drinking:

If on my theme I rightly think,
There are five reasons why men drink:—
Good wine; a friend; because I'm dry;
Or lest I should be by and by;
Or — any other reason why.

This epigram is a translation of the following Latin dictum attributed by the Menagiana to Jacques Sirmond:

Si bene quid memini, causae sunt quinque bibendi;
Hospitis adventus, praesens sitis atque futura,
Aut vini bonitas, aut quaelibet altera causa.

Aldrich had a large personal library of ca. 3000 books, 8000 pieces of music, and 2000 engravings which he bequeathed to Christ Church upon his death. His engravings constitute one of the earliest surviving English collections in this field.

== Sources ==
Academic offices
Preceded by John Massey	Dean of Christ Church, Oxford; 1689–1710	Succeeded by Francis Atterbury
Preceded by Jonathan Edwards	Vice-Chancellor of Oxford University; 1692–1695	Succeeded by Fitzherbert Adams
