= Peckwater Quadrangle =

Grade I listed building in Oxford, United Kingdom

Coordinates: 51.7513°N 1.2550°W

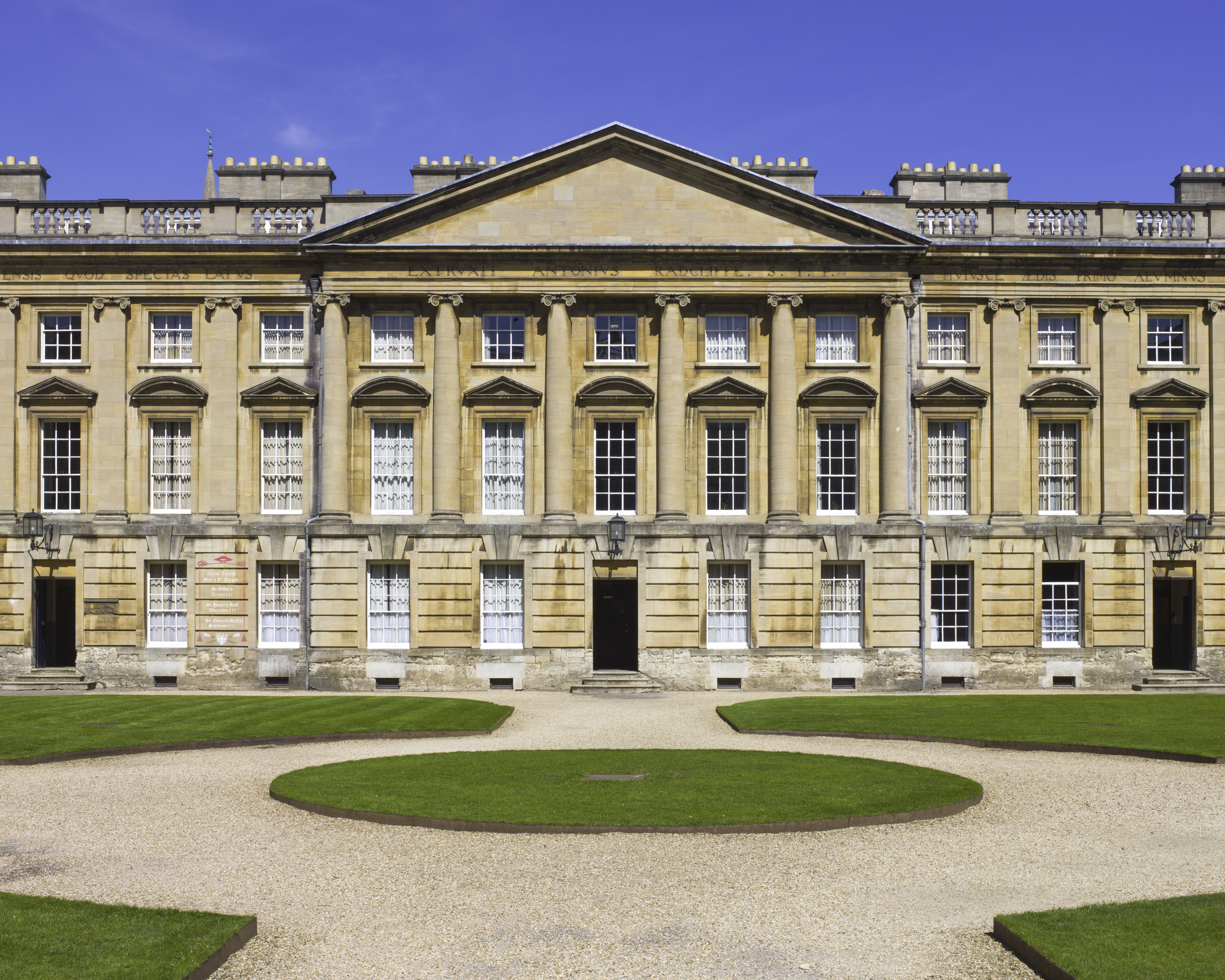
Student housing, Peckwater Quadrangle, Christ Church.

The Peckwater Quadrangle (known as "Peck" to students) is one of the quadrangles of Christ Church, Oxford, England. It is a Grade I listed building.

Christ Church Library is on the south side of the quad. To the southeast is Canterbury Quadrangle, with access to Oriel Square via Canterbury Gate.

Peckwater Quad is on the site of a medieval inn, which was run by the Peckwater family and given to St Frideswide's Priory in 1246.

The buildings on the north, east and west sides of the Quadrangle were designed by Henry Aldrich and built by William Townesend between 1706 and 1711. They constitute one of the earliest examples of English neo-Palladian architecture. The Library, on the south side, dates from later in the 18th century. First floor rooms in this quad have traditionally been particularly sought after by undergraduate members of the college due to their size, oak panelling and high ceilings. The largest examples of these rooms can be found in the corners of the building.

On 12 May 1894 and again on 20 February 1927, after dinner, Bullingdon Club members smashed almost all the glass of the lights and 468 windows in the quadrangle, along with the blinds and doors of the building.

== Gallery ==
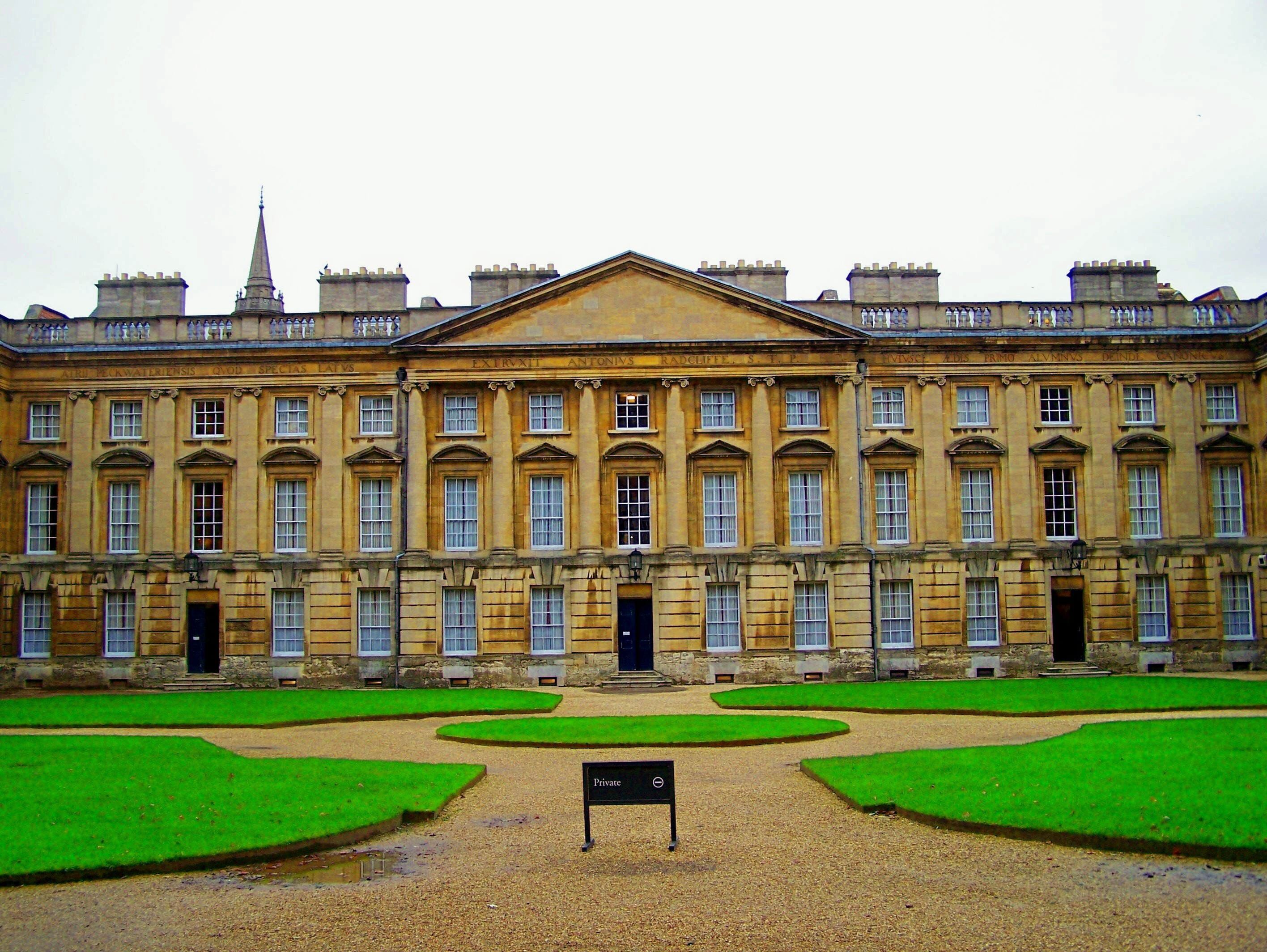

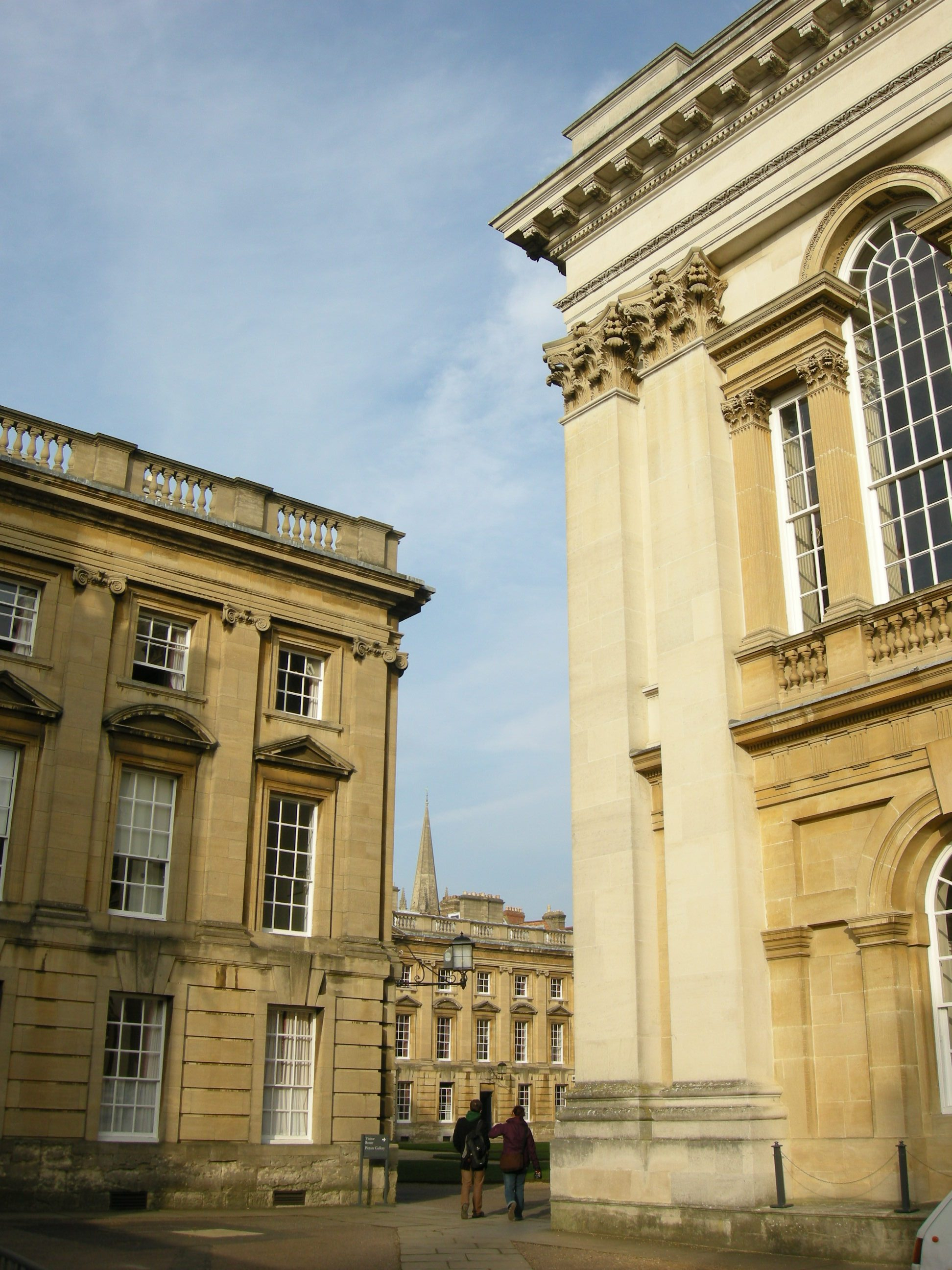

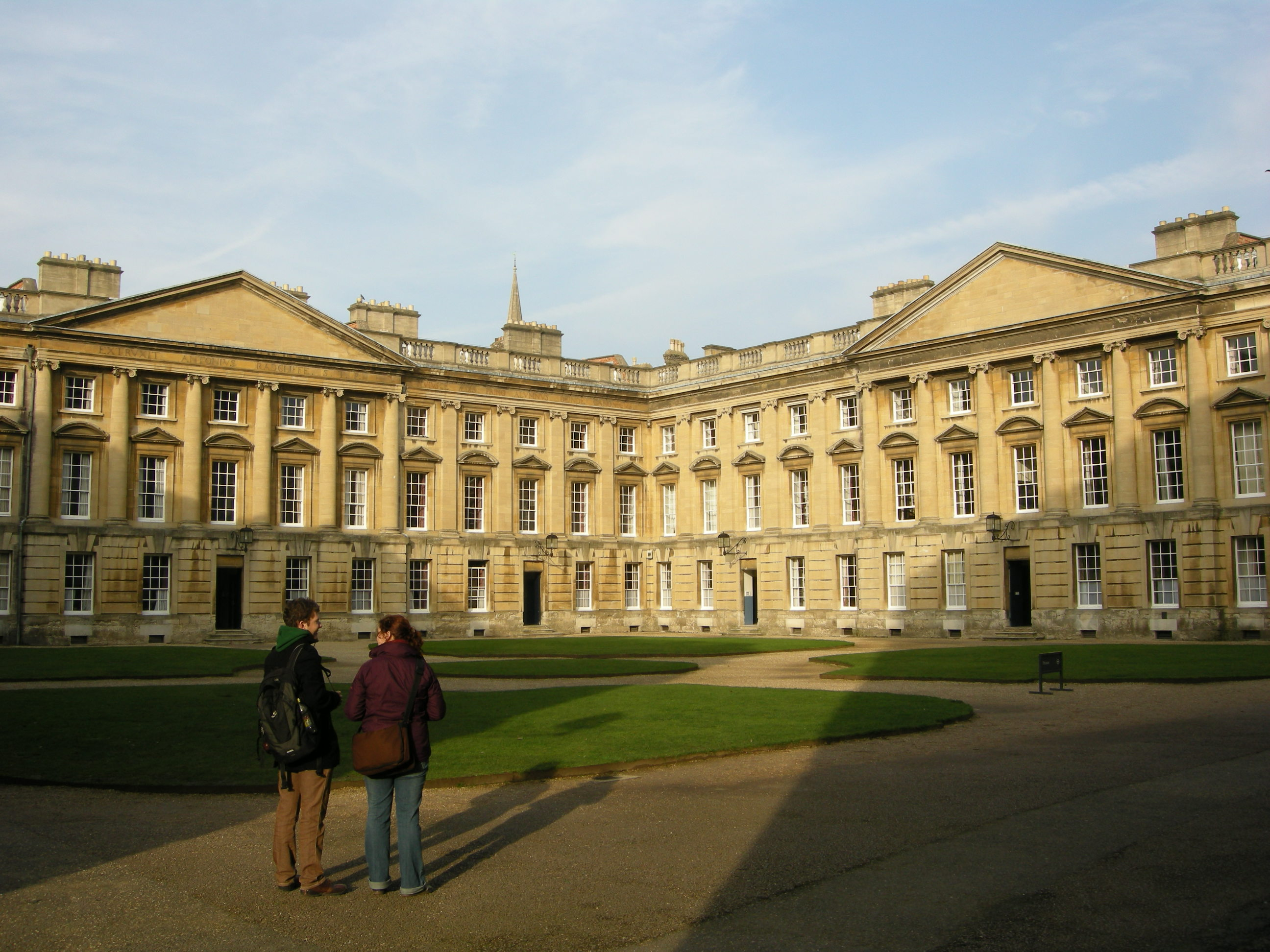

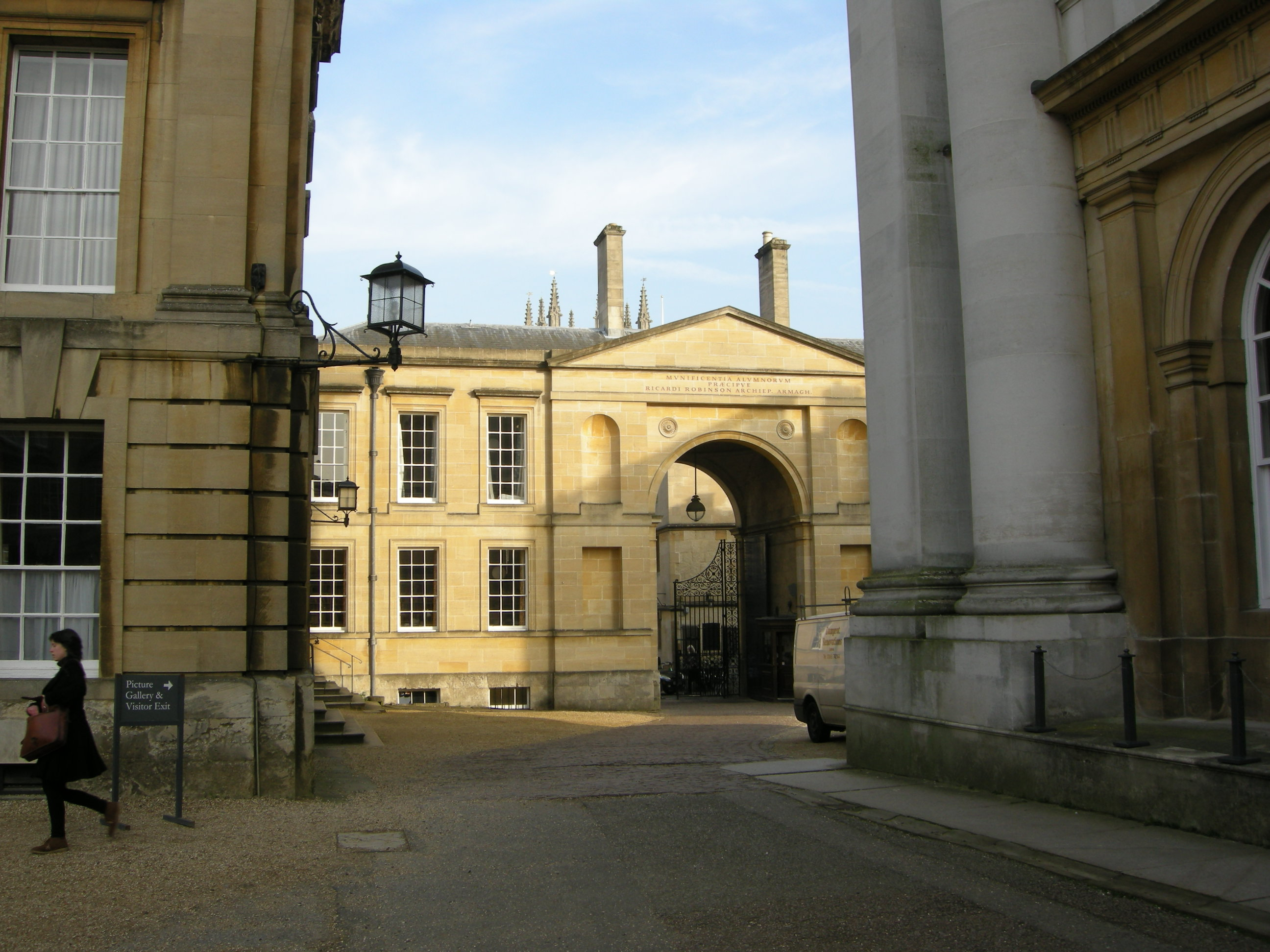

== Panorama ==
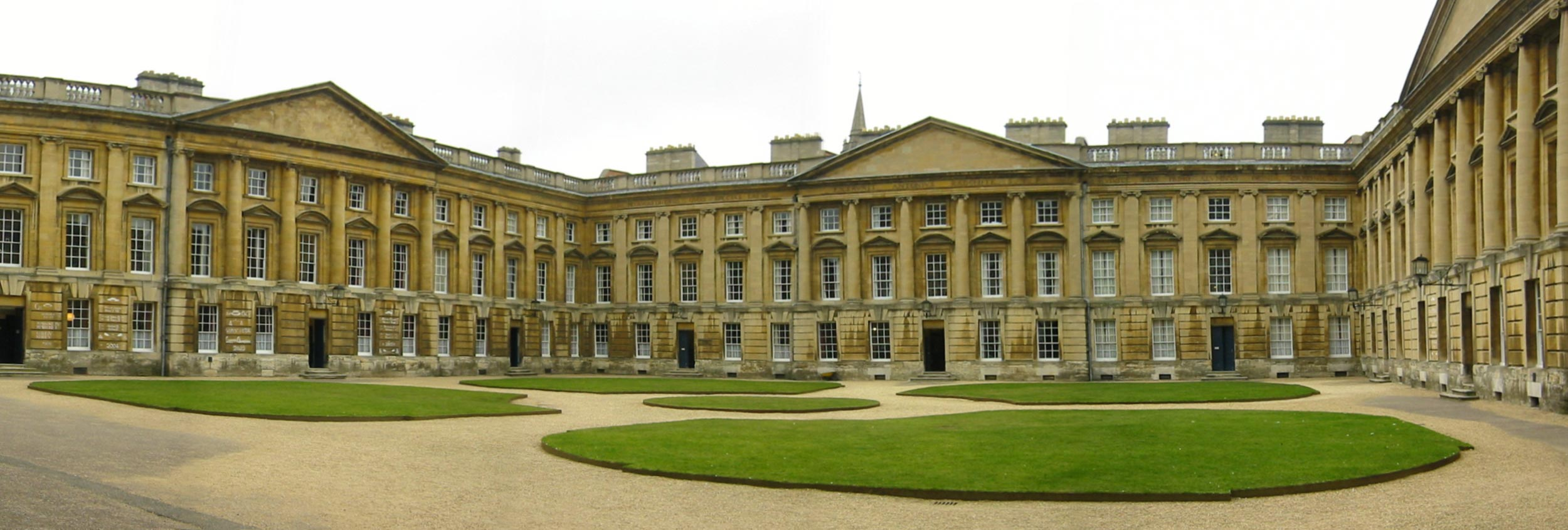
Panoramic photo of Peckwater Quadrangle.

== See also ==
- Tom Quad
- Blue Boar Quadrangle
- Meadow Building
- Christ Church Library
