= Merton Street =

Street in central Oxford, England

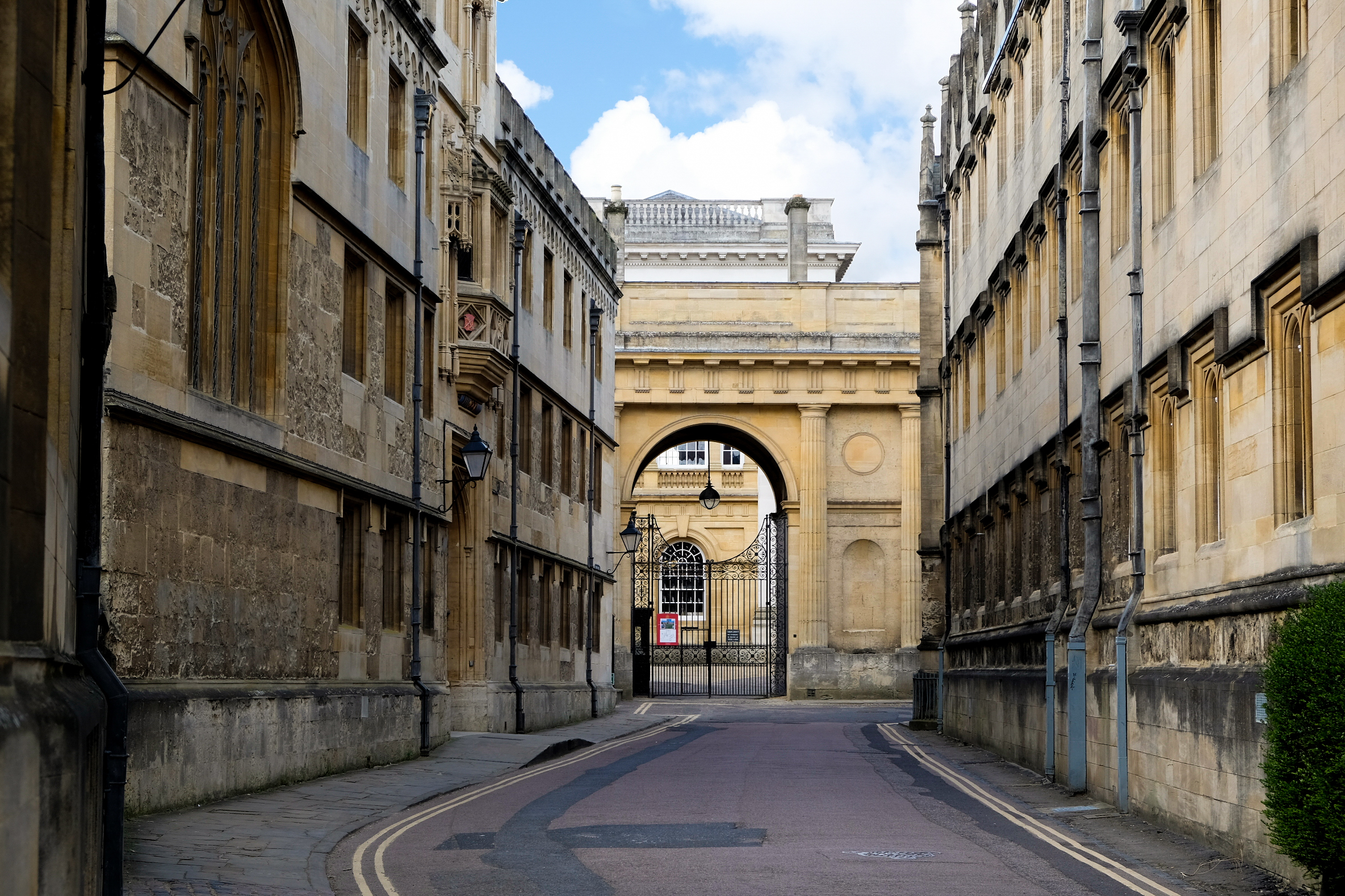
- Looking west along Merton Street in April 2021 towards the Canterbury Gate of Christ Church.

- Location within Oxford
- Former names: Coach & Horses Lane King Street St John Baptist’s Street
- Namesake: Walter de Merton
- Location: Oxford, United Kingdom
- Postal code: OX1
- Coordinates: 51.7514°N 1.2518°W
- West end: Christ Church
- East end: Examination School / Ruskin School of Art

Other
- Known for: Corpus Christi College; Christ Church; Merton College; University College

Merton Street is a cobbled street in central Oxford, England. It joins the High Street at its northeastern end, between the Ruskin School of Drawing and Fine Art (together with the Examination Schools) and the Eastgate Hotel at the historic east gate of the city. It then runs east–west, parallel and to the south of the High Street for most of its length.

== Location ==
Merton College, one of Oxford's older colleges, is situated to the south of the street. To the west of Merton, Corpus Christi College, one of Oxford's smallest colleges, also fronts onto the street. At the very western end, actually in Oriel Square, is an entrance to Christ Church, Oxford's largest college. At the eastern end can be found the notorious 'Pink House', as well as an entrance to University College.

Logic Lane (through University College, which backs onto the street) and Magpie Lane, both narrow lanes, lead off the street to the north. Also located here is the Merton Street tennis court, a rare example of an extant real tennis court. To the south is Merton Grove (opposite Magpie Lane), providing pedestrian access between Merton College and Corpus Christi College to Christ Church Meadow to the south.

The street is designated the A420 due to the blockage of the High Street to normal traffic. To the west it continues through Oriel Square, where Oriel College is located.

Despite being cobbled, the street has been repaired by Oxford City Council using asphalt.

== History ==
The part of modern-day Merton Street adjoining the High Street used to be known as Coach & Horses Lane, named after a public house on the west side of the lane. From the early 18th to the late 19th century, it became known as King Street.

The rest of the street (the part running east–west) was originally known as St John Baptist's Street, named after the church which is now Merton College's chapel. In 1751, the whole street had become King Street, but by 1772 just the east–west part was called Merton Street. The entire street became known as Merton Street only in the 20th century.

== Notable residents ==
Siegfried Sassoon briefly took rooms in no 14 during 1919, on the recommendation of Lady Ottoline Morrell. The historian Michael Brock (1920–2014) and his wife (and co-editor) Eleanor lived in the street in the early 1950s. The academic and author J. R. R. Tolkien had rooms in Merton Street towards the end of his life in the early 1970s.

== Gallery ==
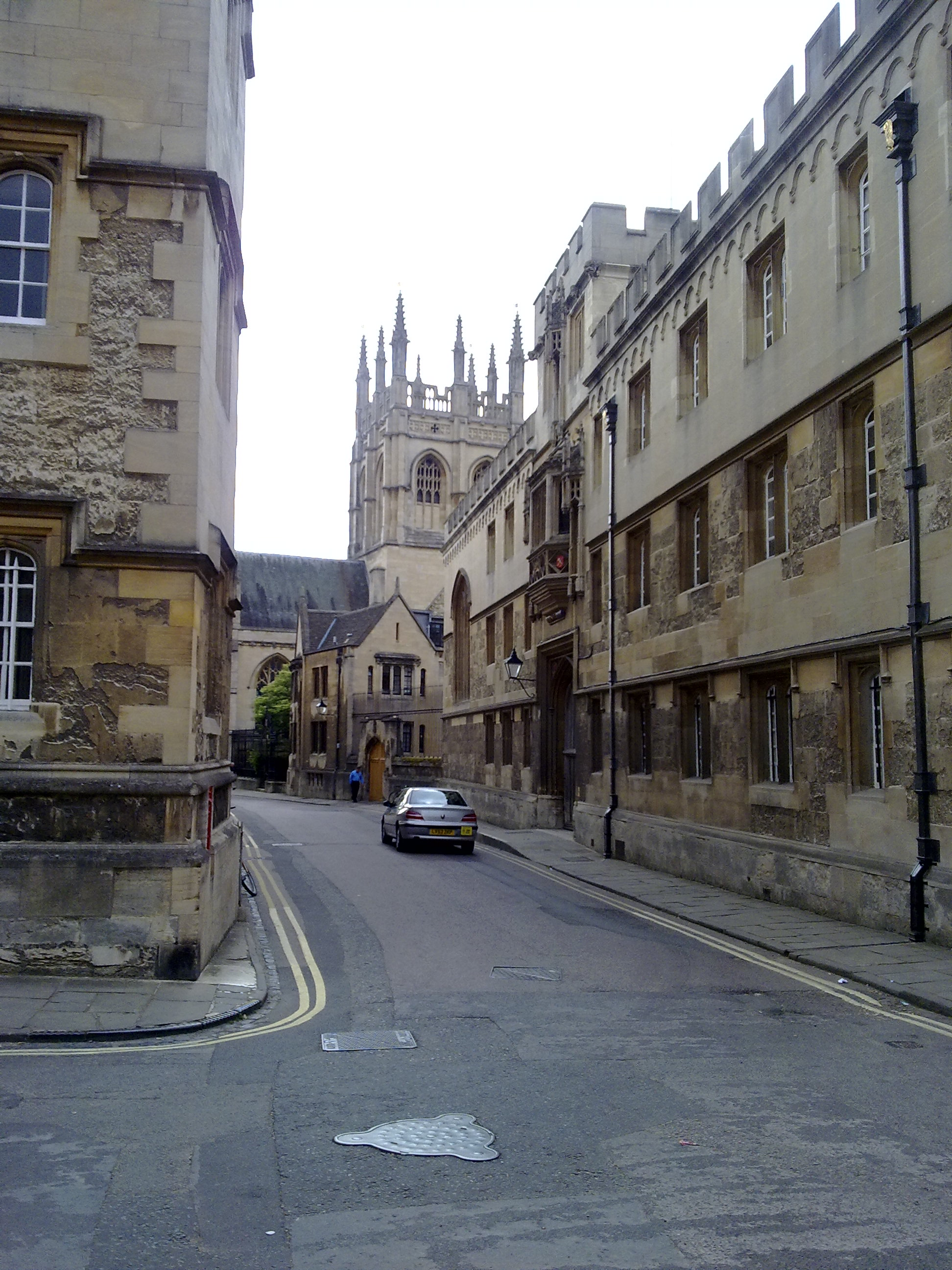
Looking down Merton Street, at the corner with Oriel Square, looking east towards Merton College.

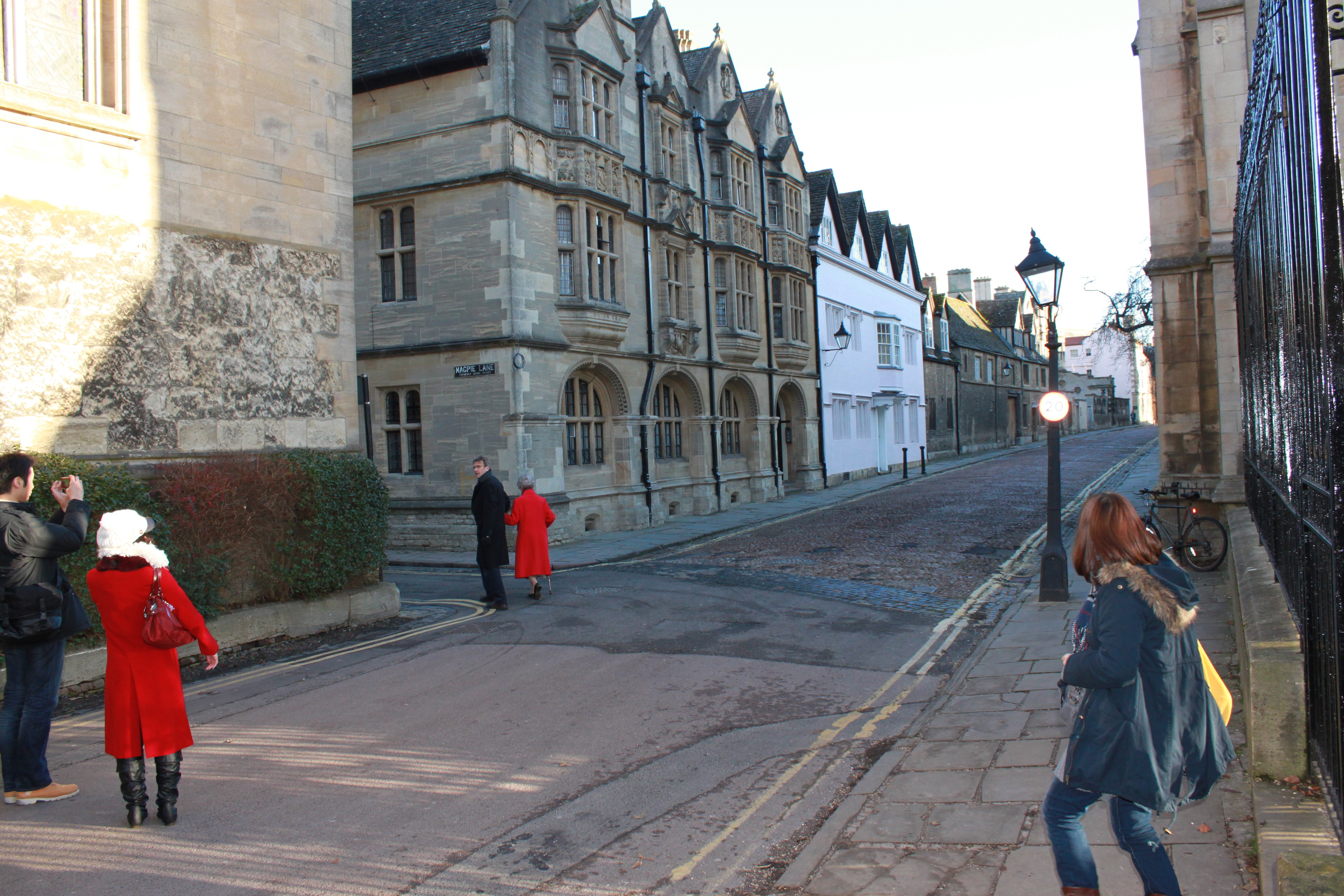
Looking east along Merton Street from the south side at the junction with Magpie Lane.
