= Oriel Street =

Street in central Oxford, England

Coordinates: 51°45′07″N 1°15′14″W

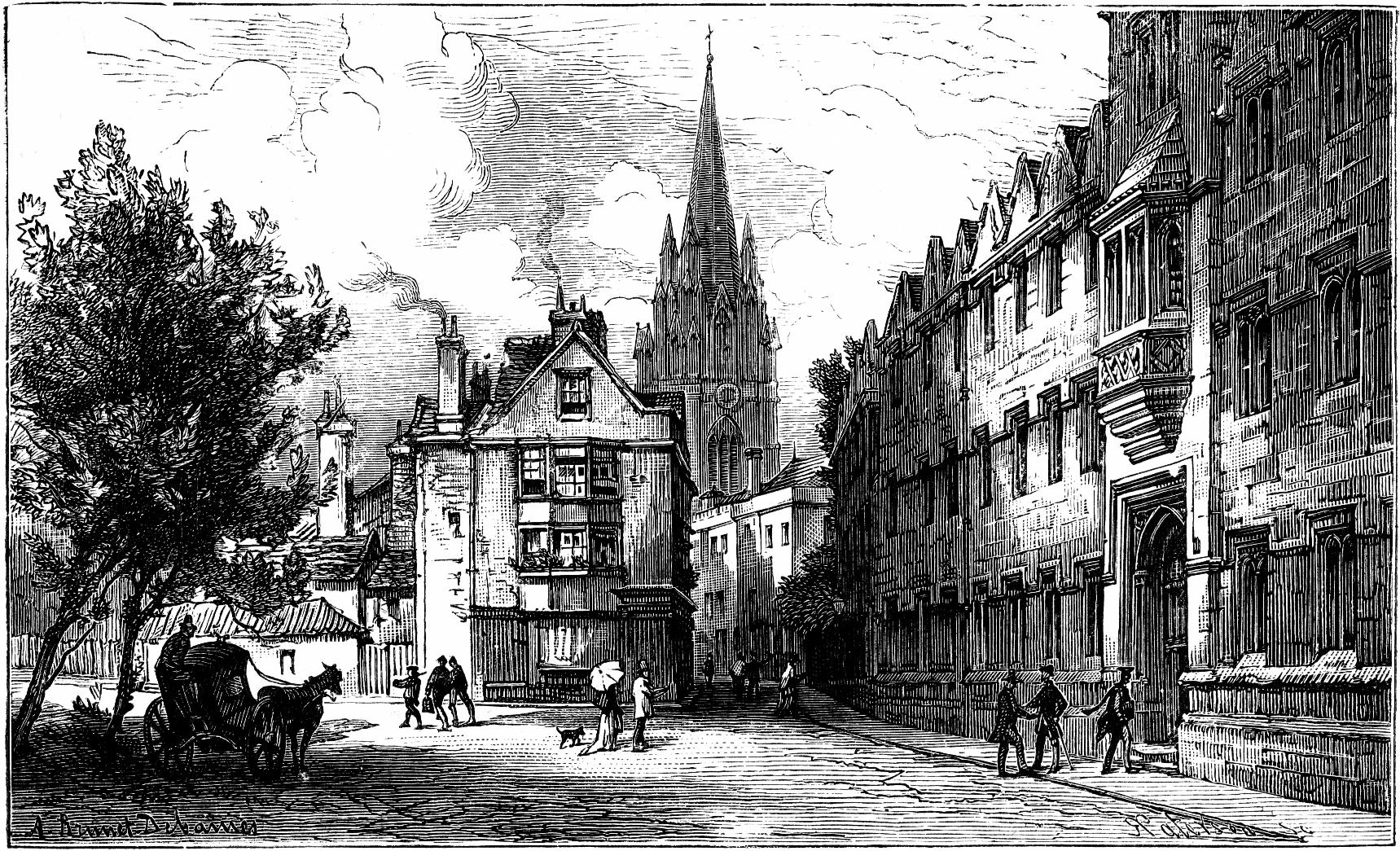
Late 19th Century view from Oriel Square north up Oriel Street with Oriel College on the right and St Mary's spire in the background.

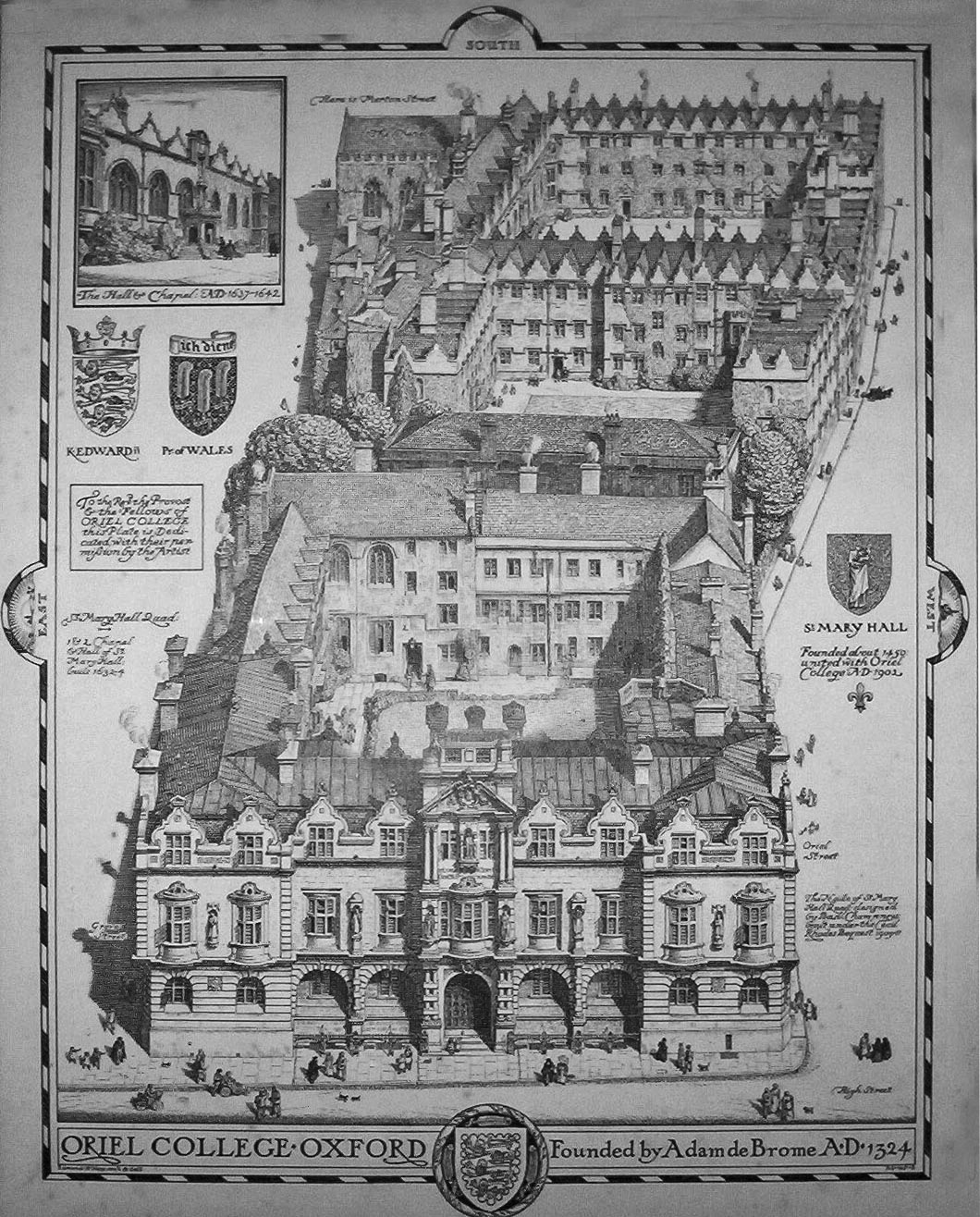
1919 photogravure of Oriel College from the north, with the Rhodes Building in the foreground and Oriel Street to the right.

Oriel Street is a narrow but historic street running between the High Street to the north and Oriel Square to the south in central Oxford, England. The street is now blocked off to traffic by bollards at the High Street end.

It passes between the main site of Oriel College (hence its name) to the east and Oriel's newer "Island" site to the west. At the High Street end to the east is the 1911 Rhodes Building, named after the former Oriel student Cecil Rhodes, who went on to colonize the African state of Rhodesia (also named after him).

== History ==
The name Oriel Street was in use by 1850. From 1210 it was called Schidyard Street, although the spelling changed over time, according to Thomas Hearne in 1728 it was Sched Row – Writers' Row, and between 1542 and 1772 it was known as St Mary Hall Lane. A map of 1814 shows the street running south through what is now Corpus Christi as far the President's lodgings. Until 1838, it was also known as Skimmery Hall Lane and Oriel Lane was in use from around the mid-19th century.

In 1833, the first of a number of theatres in Oxford to be known as "The New Theatre" was opened in St Mary Hall Lane. It is generally thought that this refers to the Oriel Square tennis court. In August 1986, a tunnel under the street, connecting St Mary quad and O'Brien quad, was completed.
