= Canterbury Quadrangle =

Quadrangle of Christ Church, Oxford, England

Coordinates: 51.75107°N 1.25439°W

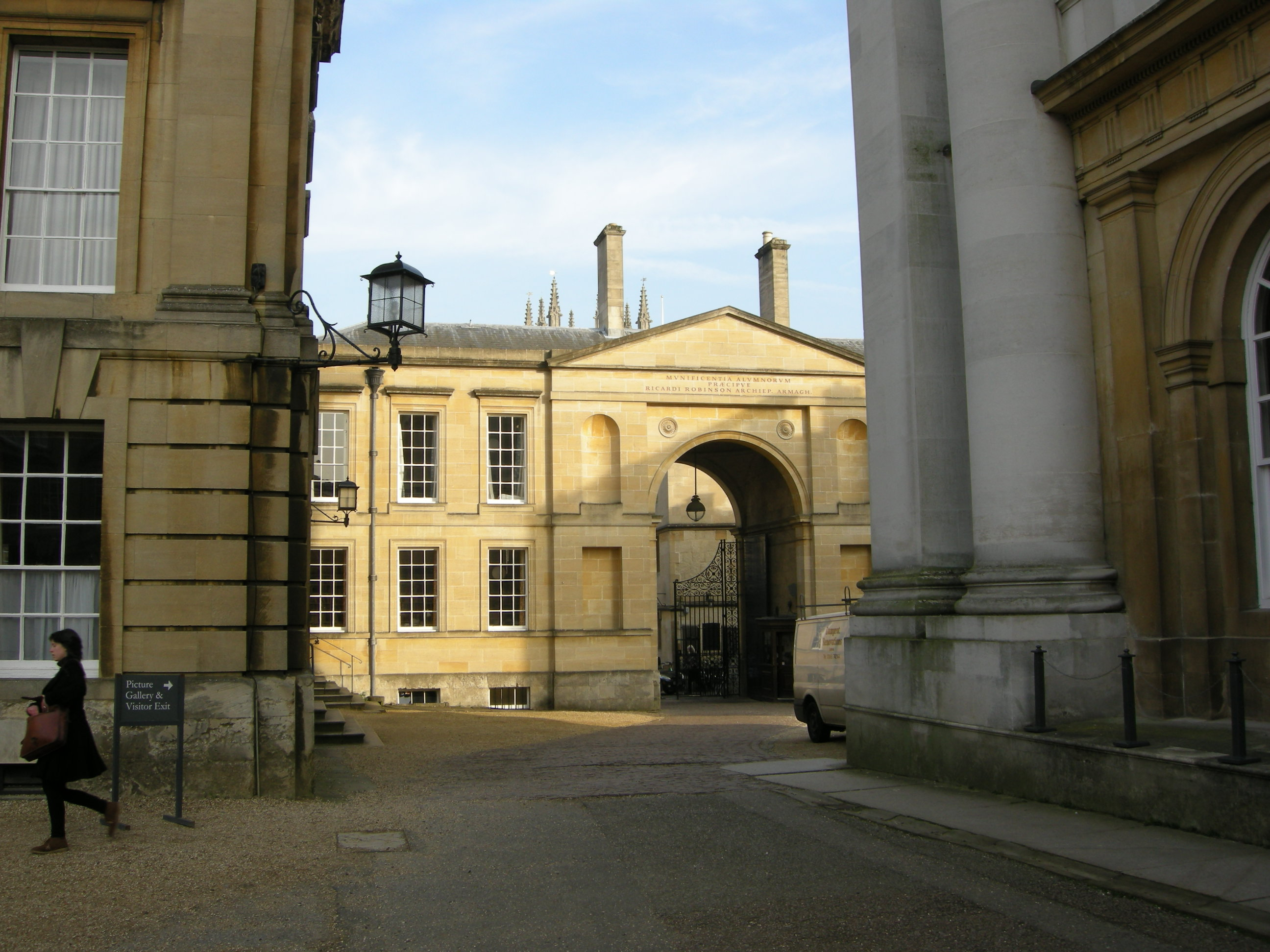
View of Canterbury Gate in Canterbury Quadrangle from Peckwater Quadrangle at Christ Church, Oxford.

The Canterbury Quadrangle is one of the quadrangles of Christ Church, Oxford, England. It stands on the site of the former Canterbury College.

On the west side is Christ Church Library, whose north façade completes the four sides of Peckwater Quadrangle. On the east side is Canterbury Gate with access to Oriel Square and Merton Street. The Christ Church Picture Gallery is accessed through staircase 4 in the south range, originally designed to house the college's most noble undergraduates. Designed by Philip Powell & Hidalgo Moya in 1968, the exterior of the Picture Gallery cannot be seen from within Canterbury Quadrangle, as it is partially sunk into the Deanery garden behind.

The original quadrangle was created 1632 to 1636 by a group of masons from London led by John Jackson and Robert White.

Canterbury Quadrangle was redesigned by the architect James Wyatt (1746–1813), in a style similar to the neighbouring Peckwater Quadrangle, and was completed in 1783. The money needed to build the quadrangle was donated to the college by Richard Robinson, 1st Baron Rokeby, Archbishop of Armagh. The quad is Grade I listed.

As an undergraduate at Christ Church from 1828, future Prime Minister, William Gladstone lived in a "leisured set" in Canterbury Quadrangle.

== See also ==
- Blue Boar Quadrangle
- Tom Quad
