= King Edward Street =

Street in Oxford, England

Coordinates: 51.7520°N 1.2545°W

Location of King Edward Street within central Oxford

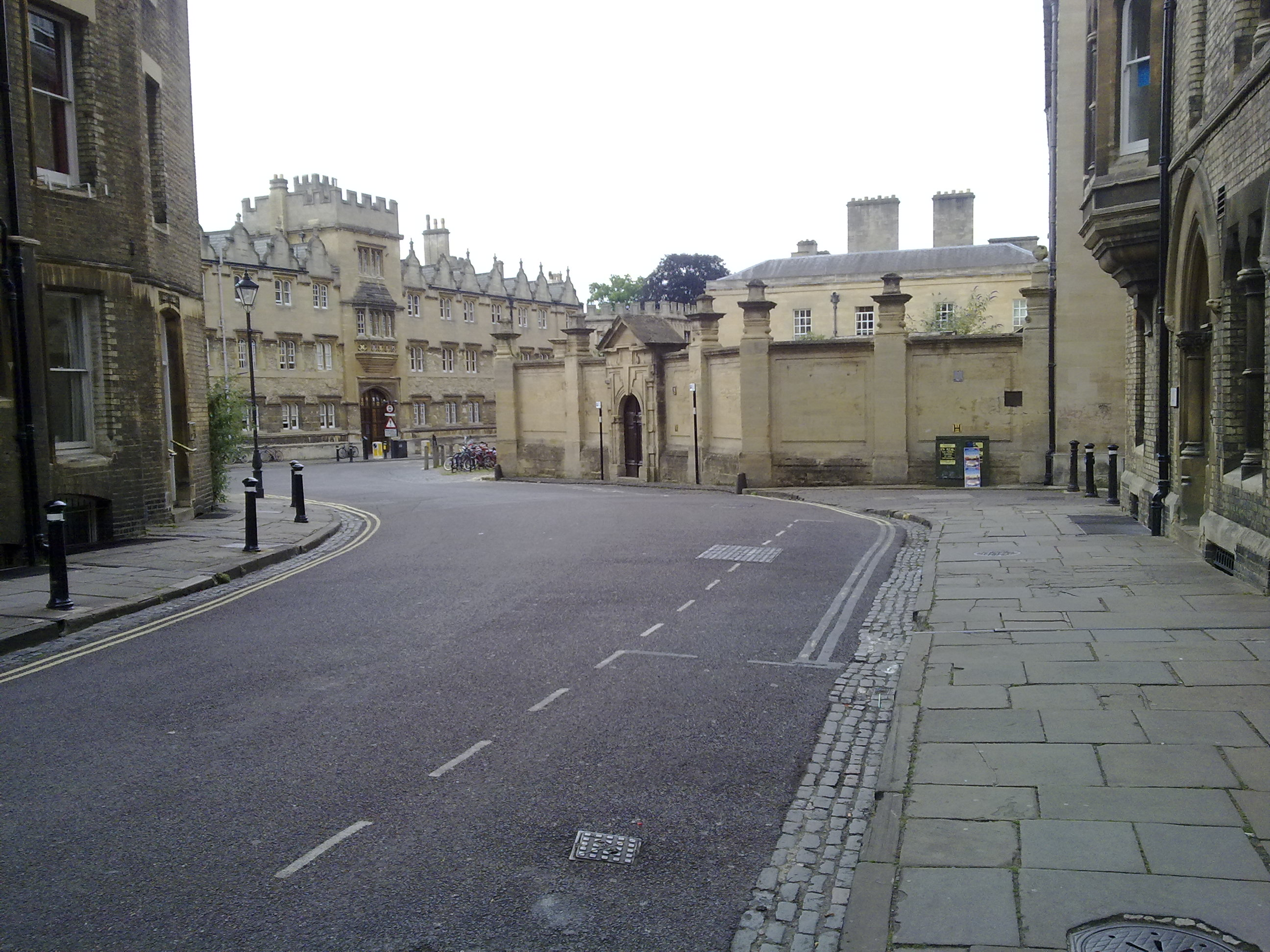
The south end of King Edward Street, looking towards Oriel College, to the east, in Oriel Square.

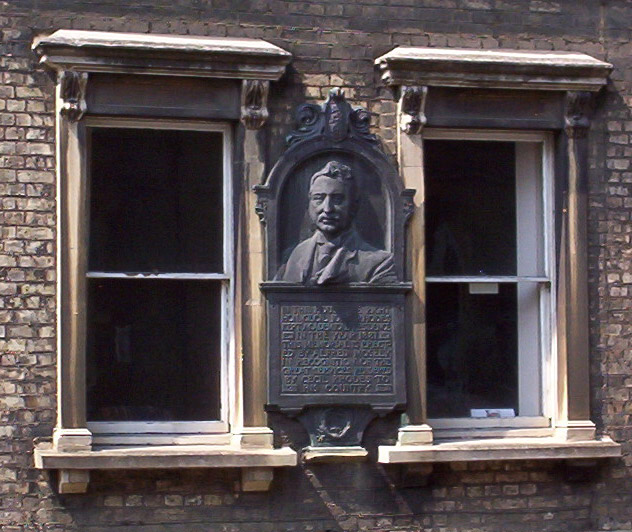
Portrait bust of Cecil Rhodes, former student at Oriel College, on the 1st floor of 6 King Edward Street.

King Edward Street is a street running between the High Street to the north and Oriel Square to the south in central Oxford, England.

On the east side of the street is the "Island" site of Oriel College, one of the colleges of Oxford University. On the west side are shops, including Shepherd & Woodward (the leading University outfitters, which fronts onto the High Street) and Vincent's Club.

King Edward Street is officially designated as part of the A420 road due to the blockage of the High Street to normal traffic.

The street was only created in 1872–73 by Oriel College when 109 and 110 High Street were demolished, so it is much wider than other older streets off the High Street. The buildings were mostly designed by Frederick Codd.

On the wall of the first floor of No. 6, there is a large metal plaque with a portrait of Cecil Rhodes; underneath is the inscription:

In this house, the Rt. Hon Cecil John Rhodes kept academical residence in the year 1881. This memorial is erected by Alfred Mosely in recognition of the great services rendered by Cecil Rhodes to his country.

On No. 14 lived Felix Yusupov, one of the murderers of Grigori Rasputin.
