= Oriel Square =

Square in central Oxford, England

Coordinates: 51.75122°N 1.25405°W

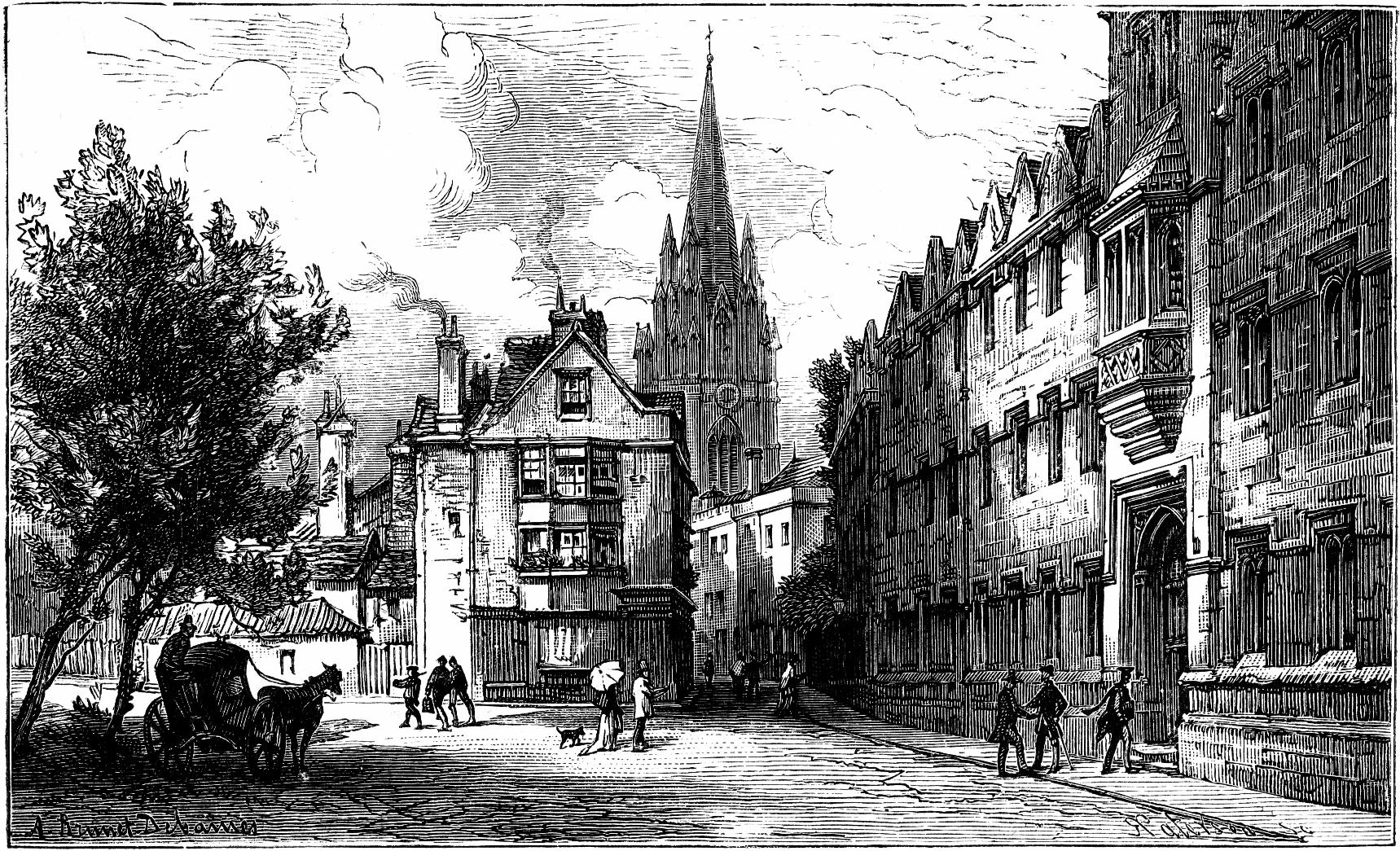
Late 19th Century view of Oriel Square, looking north up Oriel Street, with Oriel College on the right and St Mary's spire in the background.

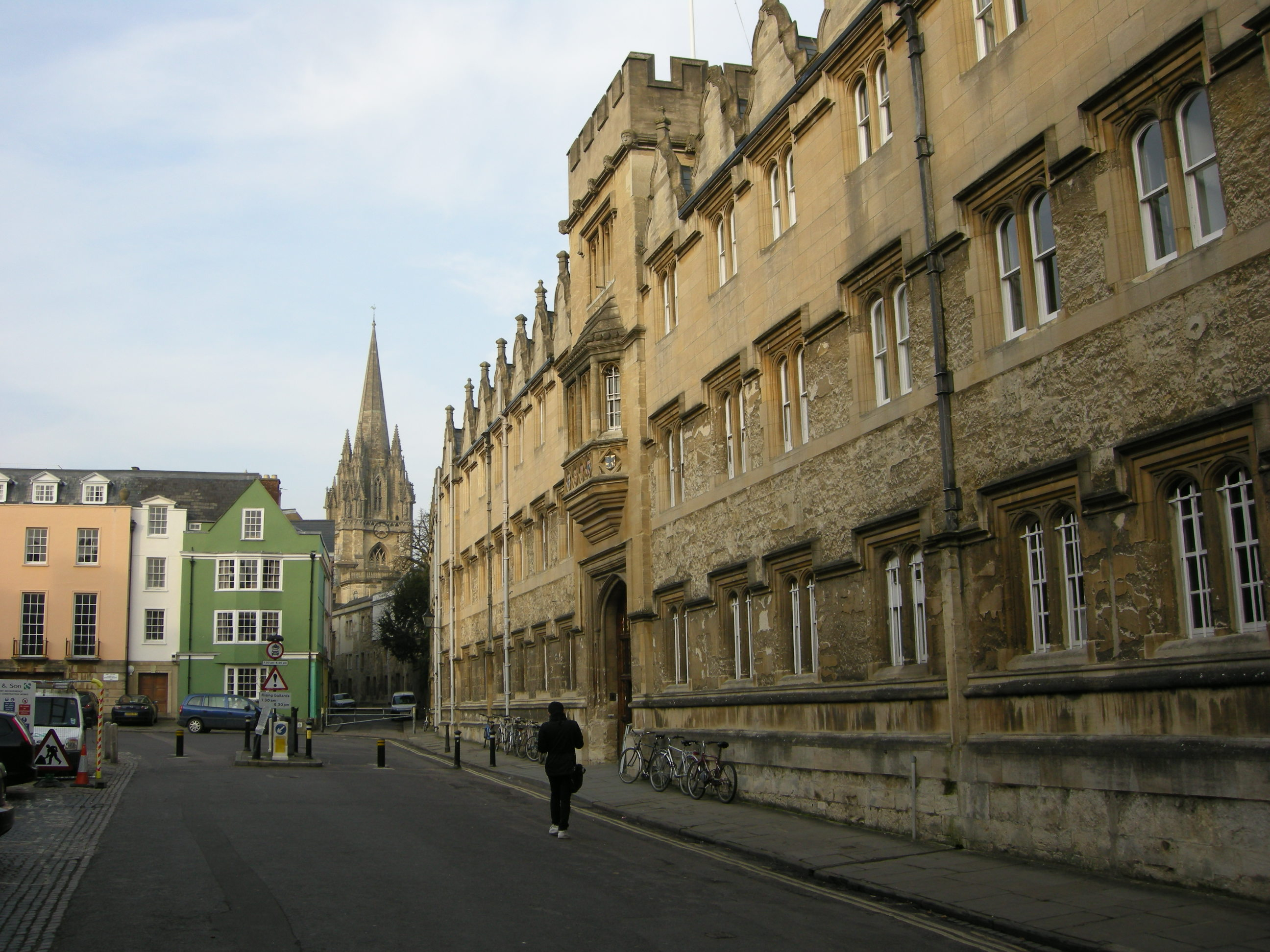
Similar view in modern times.

Oriel Square, formerly known as Canterbury Square, is a square in central Oxford, England, located south of the High Street. The name was changed after the Second World War at the request of Oriel College which maintained that the square had originally been known as Oriel Square.

== Location ==
To the east at the southern end is the cobbled Merton Street and to the north are King Edward Street and Oriel Street. To the west at the northern end is Bear Lane.

Oriel College, one of the older colleges of the University of Oxford, fronts onto the square to the east. Canterbury Gate of Christ Church also backs onto the square.

The street is officially designated as part of the A420 due to the blockage of the High Street to normal traffic. To the north it continues as King Edward Street and to the east it continues as Merton Street.

Oriel Square tennis court was a former real tennis court. The only active court left in Oxford is the Merton Street tennis court nearby.

The television crime series Inspector Morse used the square as a location in the episodes "The Dead of Jericho", "Last Seen Wearing", "The Ghost in the Machine", "Infernal Serpent", "Absolute Conviction", "Deadly Slumber" and "The Daughters of Cain".

Oriel Square is the setting for a poem by Sir John Betjeman titled "On an Old-Fashioned Water-Colour of Oxford".

== Gallery ==
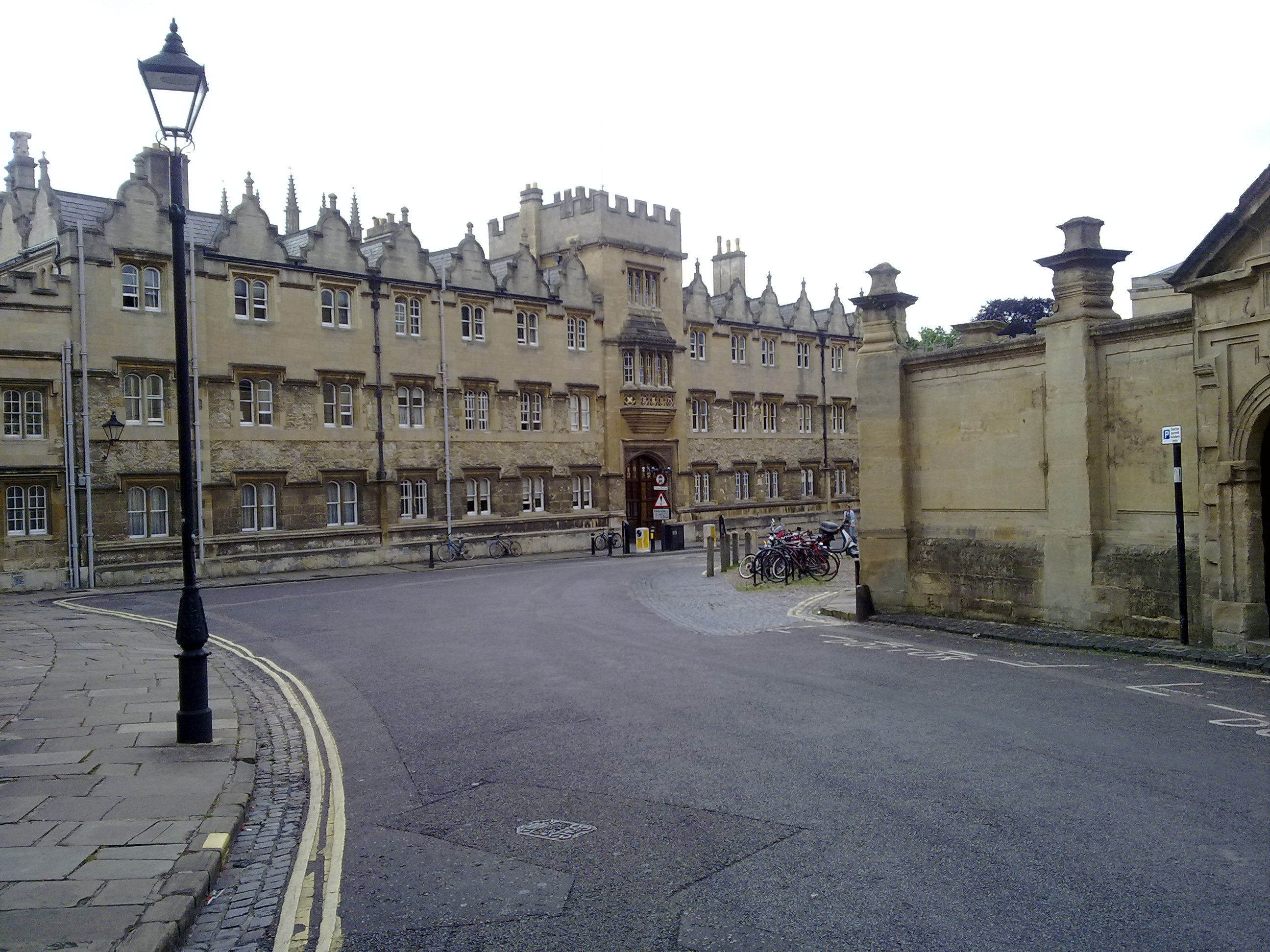
Looking towards Oriel College in Oriel Square, from King Edward Street.

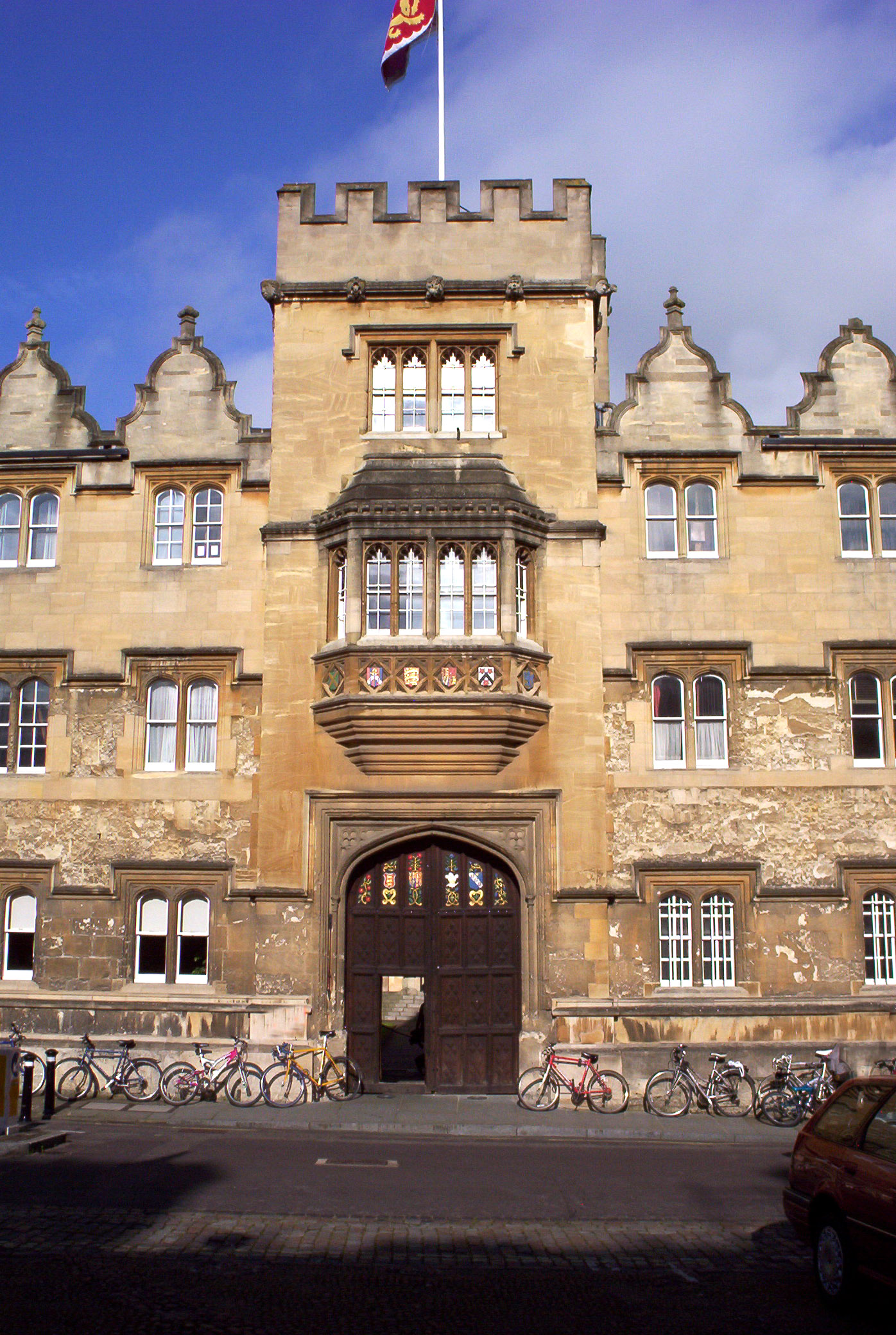
The main entrance of Oriel College in Oriel Square.
