= Examination Schools =

Building and institution of the University of Oxford

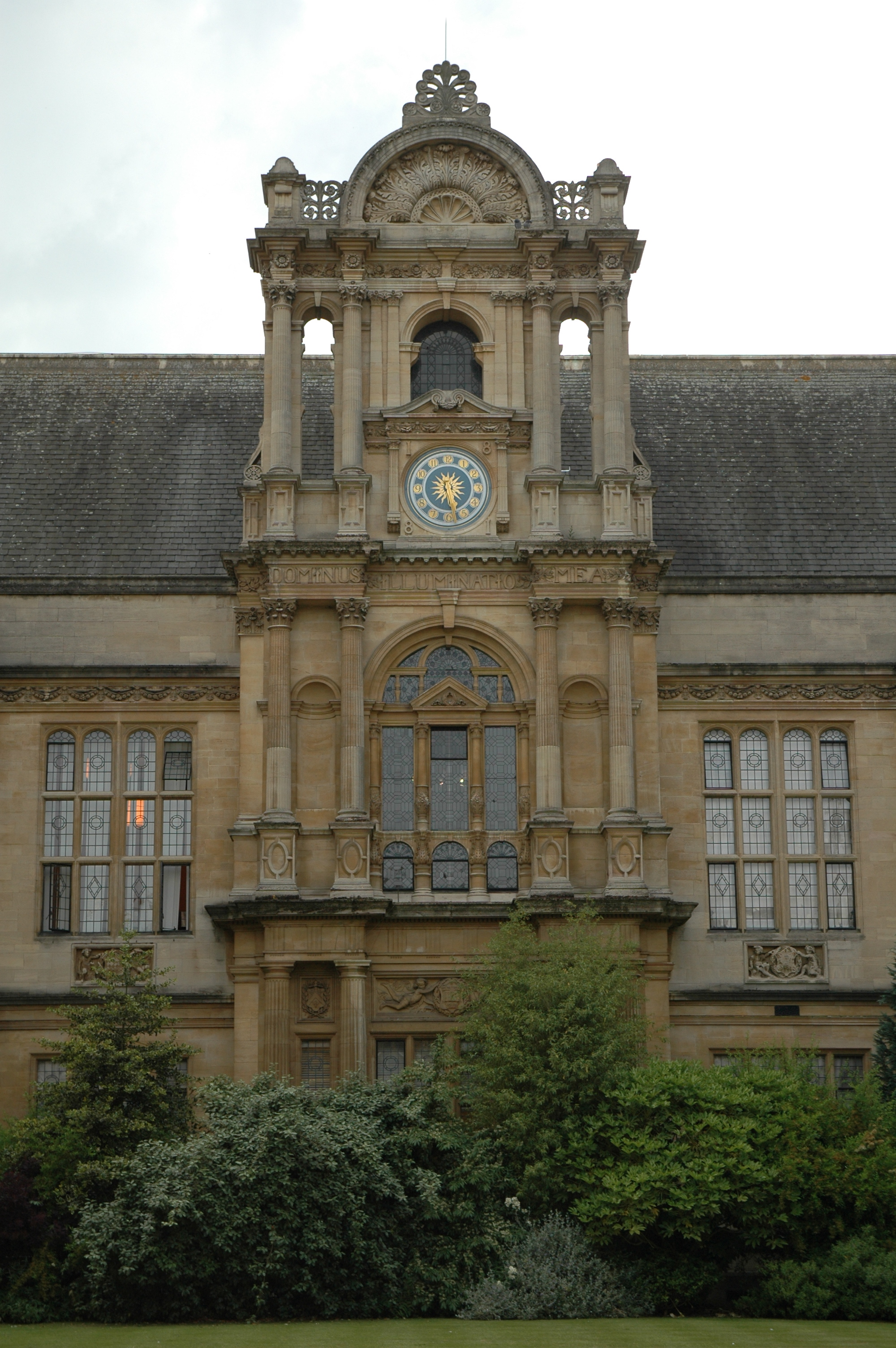
- Examination Schools

- Location within Oxford city centre

General information
- Location: Oxford, Oxfordshire, United Kingdom
- Coordinates: 51.7521°N 1.2500°W
- Construction started: 1876
- Completed: 1882
- Owner: University of Oxford

Listed Building – Grade II
- Official name: University Examination Schools
- Designated: 12 January 1954
- Reference no.: 1115427

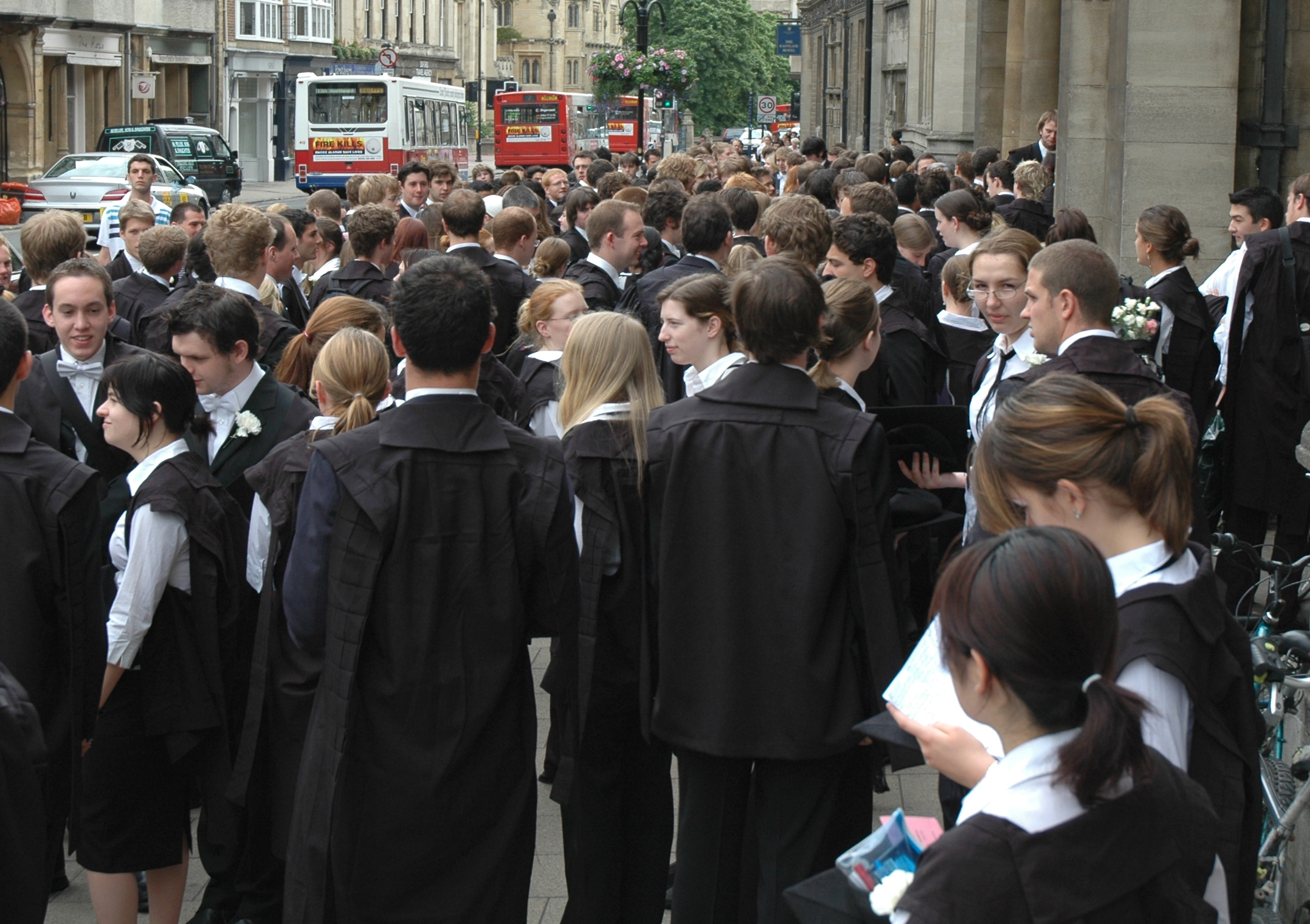
Students outside the Examination Schools.

The Examination Schools of the University of Oxford are located at 75–81 High Street, Oxford, England. The building was designed by Sir Thomas Jackson (1835–1924), who also designed several other University buildings, such as much of Brasenose College. The designs for the building were prepared in 1876 and it was completed in 1882, in Clipsham stone. The Examination Schools building is Grade II listed.

During the First World War, the Examination Schools together with Somerville College and other Oxford buildings were requisitioned by the War Office to create the 3rd Southern General Hospital, a facility for the Royal Army Medical Corps to treat military casualties. The headquarters of the hospital were at the Examination Schools.

The main purpose of the Schools is for the organisation and administration of the university examinations. Many of the final and other examinations for the University's students take place in the building, especially during Trinity Term. There is access to the building from both the High Street and Merton Street. Traditionally there have been parties in the street by students who have finished their exams, although the University tries to take measures to prevent this. At their height, traffic has been disrupted in the High Street. In Michaelmas Term, the Examination Schools are host to the university's Freshers' Fair.

The building provides a major lecturing facility for the University and is also used as a meeting and conference venue outside term time. It is one of the largest buildings owned by the University.

The Ruskin School of Drawing & Fine Art is located at 74 High Street to the east of the Examination Schools and University College is to the west.
