= Merton Street tennis court =

Tennis court in Oxford, Oxfordshire, England

Coordinates: 51.7517°N 1.2519°W

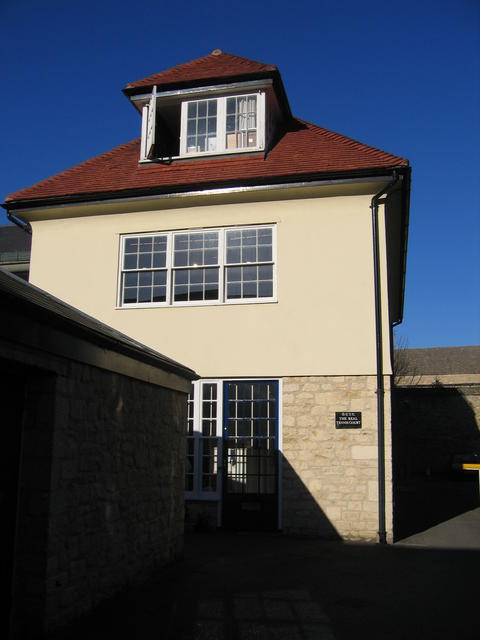
Merton Street tennis court

Merton Street tennis court is the home of the Oxford University Real Tennis Club. It stands on the north side of Merton Street in central Oxford, England, and forms part of Merton College.

There has been a tennis court in Oxford since 1450 and one at the Merton Street site since c. 1494, according to one source. Alternatively, according to another source, Oxford has had a court since 1595 and one at this site when it was rebuilt in 1798. The Merton Street court, being early, has somewhat non-standard dimensions, and in particular an unusually flat tambour (a buttress used as part of the court).

It is the smallest court in England and the second oldest.

== See also ==
- Oriel Square tennis court

== Bibliography ==
- Tennis and Oxford by Jeremy Potter; 1st edition of 1994; 152 pp in 8vo and dw.
