= Oriel College, Oxford =

College of the University of Oxford

Oriel College
- University of Oxford
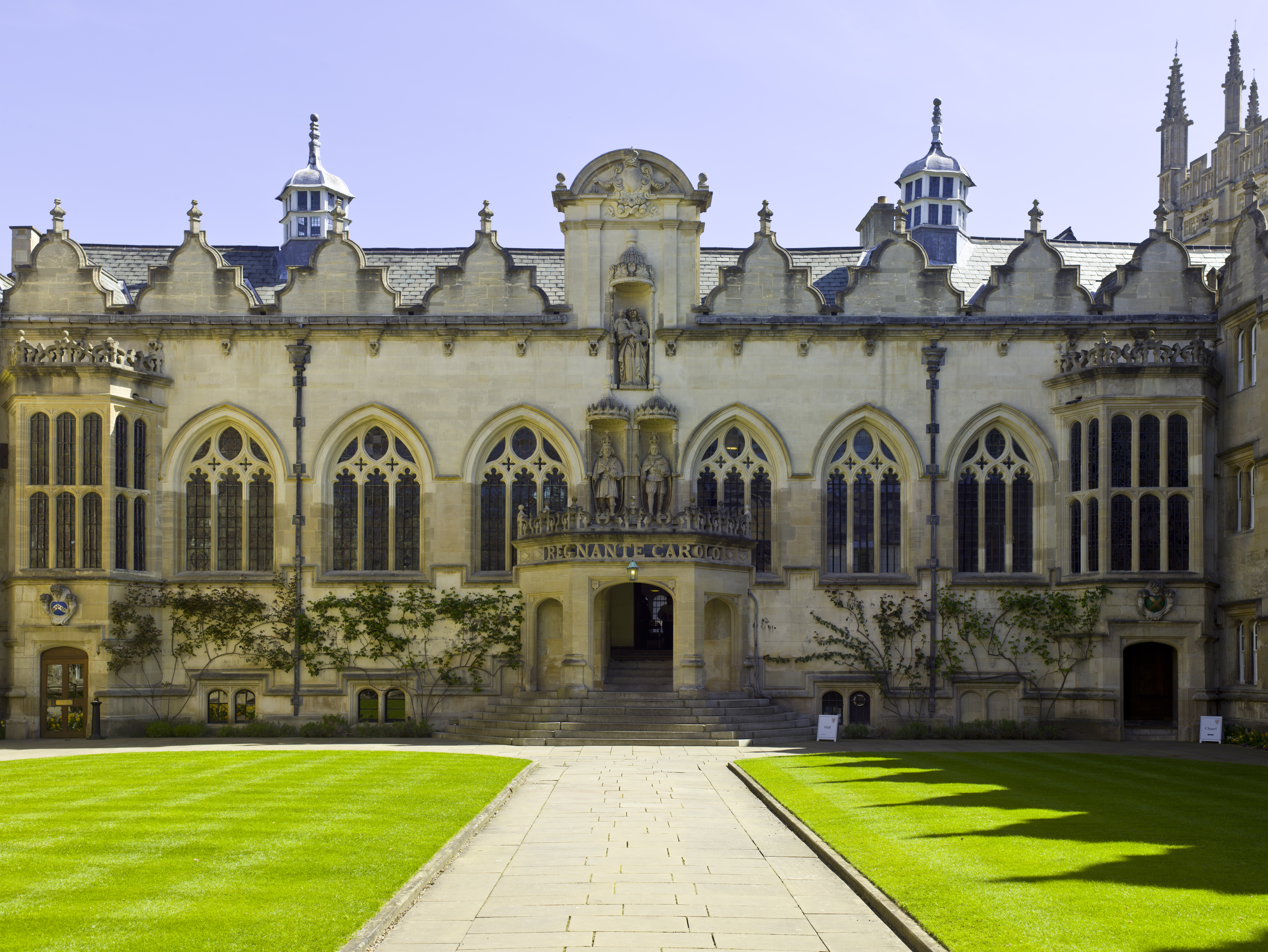

- Arms: Gules, three lions passant guardant in pale or, a bordure engrailed argent
- Location: Oriel Square, Oxford OX1 4EW
- Coordinates: 51.7519°N 1.2538°W
- Full name: The Provost and Scholars of the House of the Blessed Mary the Virgin in Oxford, commonly called Oriel College, of the Foundation of Edward the Second of famous memory, sometime King of England
- Latin name: Collegium Orielense; Prepositus et Scholares domus beate Marie Virginis in Oxonia vulgariter vocata Oriell Colledge de fundatione inclite memorie Edwardi quondam Regis Anglie secundi
- Founders: Adam de Brome; Edward II of England
- Established: 1324; 702 years ago
- Founded: 1326; 700 years ago
- Named for: Blessed Virgin Mary; oriel window
- Sister colleges: Clare College, Cambridge; Trinity College Dublin
- Provost: The Lord Mendoza
- Undergraduates: 340 (2023–24)
- Postgraduates: 245 (2023–24)
- Endowment: £96.6 million (2022)
- Visitor: Charles III (The Crown ex officio)
- Website: Official website
- Boat club: Oriel College Boat Club

Map
- Location within Oxford city centre

Oriel College (/ˈɔːriəl/) is a constituent college of the University of Oxford in Oxford, England. Located in Oriel Square, the college has the distinction of being the oldest royal foundation in Oxford (a title formerly claimed by University College, whose claim of being founded by King Alfred is no longer promoted). In recognition of this royal connection, the college has also been historically known as King's College and King's Hall. The reigning monarch of the United Kingdom (since 2022, Charles III) is the official visitor of the college.

The original medieval foundation established in 1324 by Adam de Brome, under the patronage of King Edward II, was the House of the Blessed Mary at Oxford, and the college received a royal charter in 1326. In 1329, an additional royal grant of a manor house, La Oriole, eventually gave rise to its common name. The first design allowed for a provost and ten fellows, called "scholars", and the college remained a small body of graduate fellows until the 16th century, when it started to admit undergraduates. During the English Civil War, Oriel played host to high-ranking members of the king's Oxford Parliament.

The main site of the college incorporates four medieval halls: Bedel Hall, St Mary Hall, St Martin Hall, and Tackley's Inn, the last being the oldest standing medieval hall in Oxford. The college has nearly 40 fellows, about 300 undergraduates and some 250 graduates. Oriel was the last of Oxford's men's colleges to admit women, doing so in 1985 after more than six centuries as an all-male institution. Today, however, the student body has almost equal numbers of men and women. Oriel's notable alumni include two Nobel laureates; prominent fellows have included founders of the Oxford Movement. Among Oriel's more notable possessions are a painting by Bernard van Orley and three pieces of medieval silver plate. As of the 2020–21 academic year, the college was ranked twentieth in academic performance out of thirty colleges in the Norrington Table, having topped the table in 2015–16.

== History ==
=== Middle Ages ===
On 24 April 1324, the Rector of the University Church, Adam de Brome, obtained a licence from King Edward II to found a "certain college of scholars studying various disciplines in honour of the Virgin" and to endow it to the value of £30 a year. Brome bought two properties in 1324, Tackley's Hall, on the south side of the High Street, and Perilous Hall, on the north side of Broad Street, and as an investment, he also purchased the advowson of a church in Aberford.

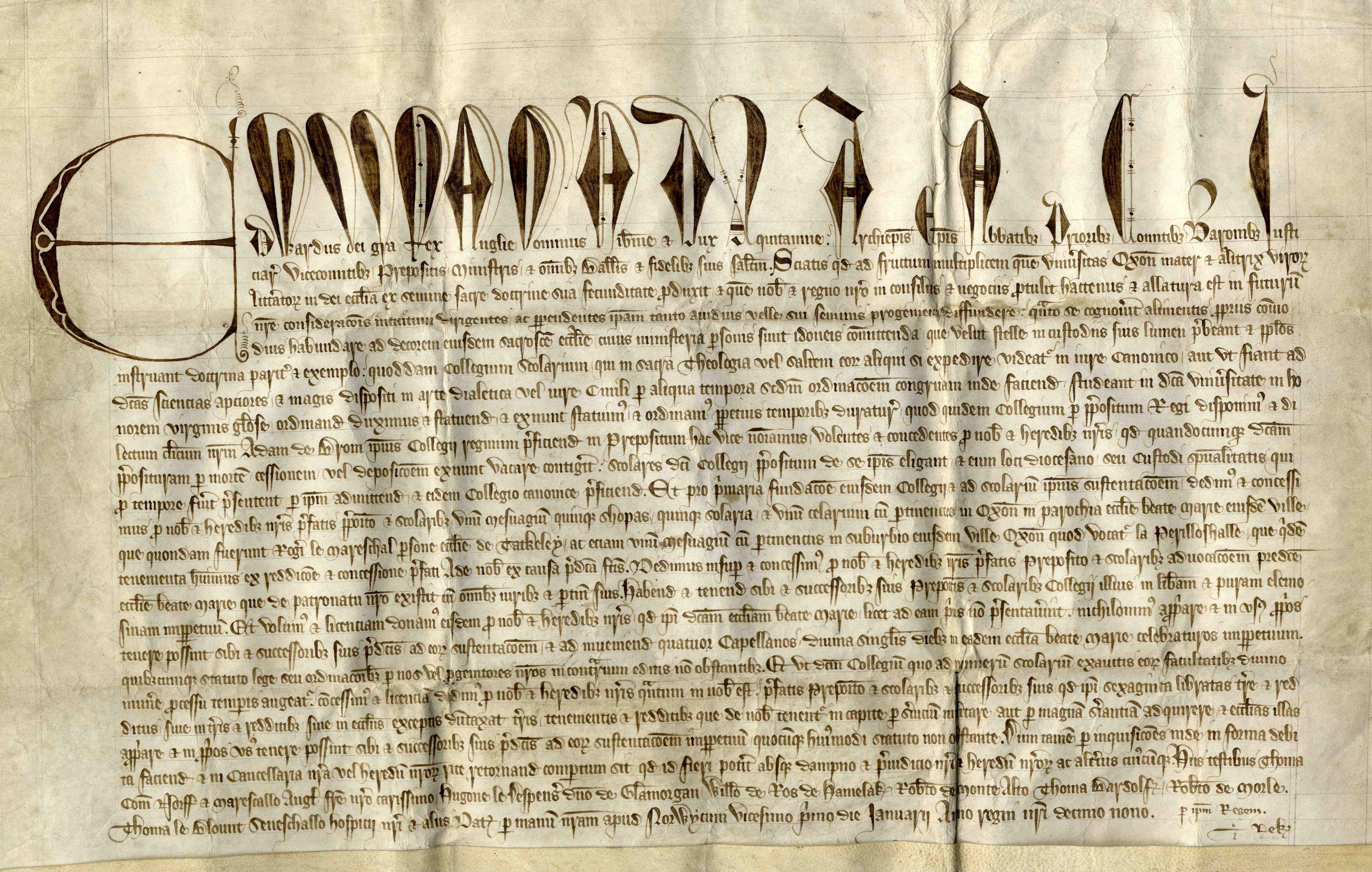
The college charter of 1326 given by Edward II. The concluding nine words give the date as 21 January in the nineteenth year of his reign.

Brome's foundation was confirmed in a charter dated 21 January 1326, in which the Crown, represented by the Lord Chancellor, was to exercise the rights of Visitor; a further charter drawn up in May of that year gave the rights of Visitor to Henry Burghersh, Bishop of Lincoln, as Oxford at that time was part of the diocese of Lincoln. Under Edward's patronage, Brome diverted the revenues of the University Church to his college, which thereafter was responsible for appointing the Vicar and providing four chaplains to celebrate the daily services in the church. The college lost no time in seeking royal favour again after Edward II's deposition, and Edward III confirmed his father's favour in February 1327, but the amended statutes with the Bishop of Lincoln as Visitor remained in force. In 1329, the college received by royal grant a large house belonging to the Crown, known as La Oriole, on the site of what is now First Quad. It is from this property that the college acquired its common name, "Oriel"; the name was in use from about 1349. The word referred to an oratoriolum, or oriel window, forming a feature of the earlier property.

In the early 1410s several fellows of Oriel took part in the disturbances accompanying Archbishop Arundel's attempt to stamp out Lollardy in the university; the Lollard belief that religious power and authority came through piety and not through the hierarchy of the Church particularly inflamed passions in Oxford, where its proponent, John Wycliffe, had been head of Balliol. Disregarding the provost's authority, Oriel's fellows fought bloody battles with other scholars, killed one of the Chancellor's servants when they attacked his house, and were prominent among the group that obstructed the Archbishop and ridiculed his censures.

In 1442, Henry VI sanctioned an arrangement whereby the town was to pay the college £25 a year from the fee farm (a type of feudal tax) in exchange for decayed property, allegedly worth £30 a year, which the college could not afford to keep in repair. The arrangement was cancelled in 1450.

=== Early Modern ===
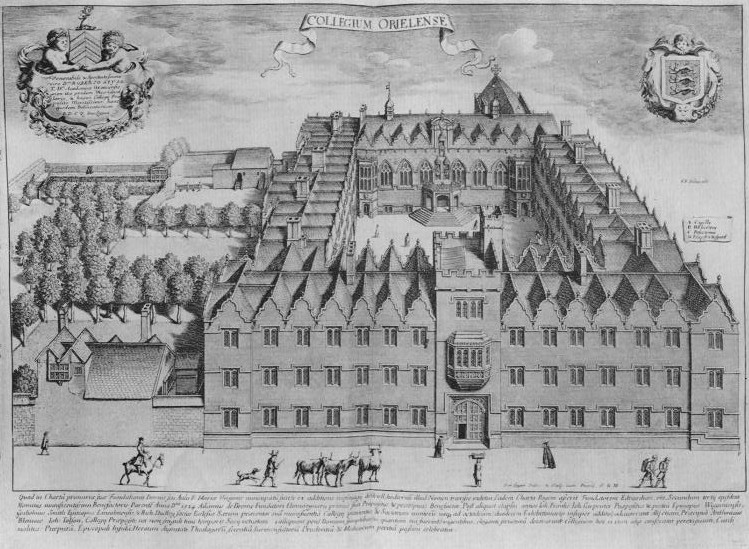
1675 copper engraving of the college, looking east across the front entrance and First Quad; on the left is the tiered garden where Second Quad would be built.

In 1643, a general obligation was imposed on Oxford colleges to support the Royalist cause in the English Civil War. The King called for Oriel's plate, and almost all of it was given, the total weighing 29 lb. 0 oz. 5 dwt. of gilt, and 52 lb. 7 oz. 14 dwt. of "white" plate. In the same year the college was assessed at £1 of the weekly sum of £40 charged on the colleges and halls for the fortification of the city. When the Oxford Parliament was assembled during the Civil War in 1644, Oriel housed the executive committee of the Privy Council, Parliament being held at neighbouring Christ Church. Following the defeat of the Royalist cause, the university was scrutinised by the Parliamentarians, and five of the eighteen Oriel fellows were removed. The Visitors, on their own authority, elected fellows between 1648 and October 1652, when without reference to the Commissioners, John Washbourne was chosen; the autonomy of the college in this respect seems to have been restored.

In 1673 James Davenant, a fellow since 1661, complained to William Fuller, then Bishop of Lincoln, about Provost Say's conduct in the election of Thomas Twitty to a fellowship. Bishop Fuller appointed a commission that included the Vice-Chancellor, Peter Mews; the Dean of Christ Church, John Fell; and the Principal of Brasenose, Thomas Yates. On 1 August Fell reported to the Bishop that:

When this Devil of buying and selling is once cast out, your Lordship will, I hope, take care that he return not again, lest he bring seven worse than himself into the house after 'tis swept and garnisht.

On 24 January 1674, Bishop Fuller issued a decree dealing with the recommendations of the commissioners – a majority of all the fellows should always be present at an election, so the provost could not push an election in a thin meeting, and fellows should be admitted immediately after their election. On 28 January Provost Say obtained from the King a recommendation for Twitty's election, but it was withdrawn on 13 February, following the Vice-Chancellor's refusal to swear Twitty into the university and the Bishop's protests at Court.

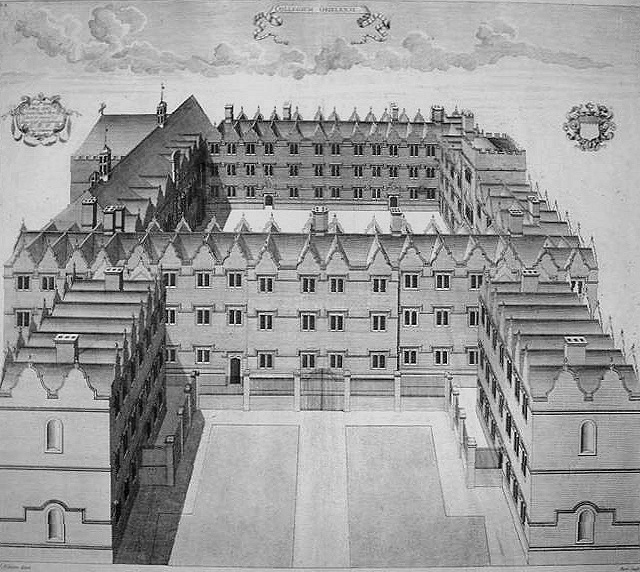
1733 copper engraving of the college, looking south, after the completion of Bishop Robinson's and Provost Carter's buildings in Second Quad

During the early 1720s, a constitutional struggle began between the provost and the fellows, culminating in a lawsuit. In 1721, Henry Edmunds was elected as a fellow by 9 votes to 3; his election was rejected by Provost George Carter, and on appeal, by the Visitor, Edmund Gibson, then Bishop of Lincoln. The provost continued to reject candidates, fuelling discontent among the fellows, until a writ of attachment against the Bishop of Lincoln was heard between 1724 and 1726. The opposing fellows, led by Edmunds, appealed to the original statutes, claiming the Crown as Visitor, making Gibson's decisions invalid; Provost Carter, supported by Bishop Gibson, appealed to the second version, claiming the Bishop of Lincoln as Visitor. The jury decided for the fellows, supporting the original charter of Edward II.

In a private printing of 1899, Provost Shadwell lists thirteen Gaudies observed by the college during the 18th century; by the end of the 19th century all but two, the Feast of the Immaculate Conception and the Purification of the Virgin, had ceased to be celebrated.

=== Modern ===
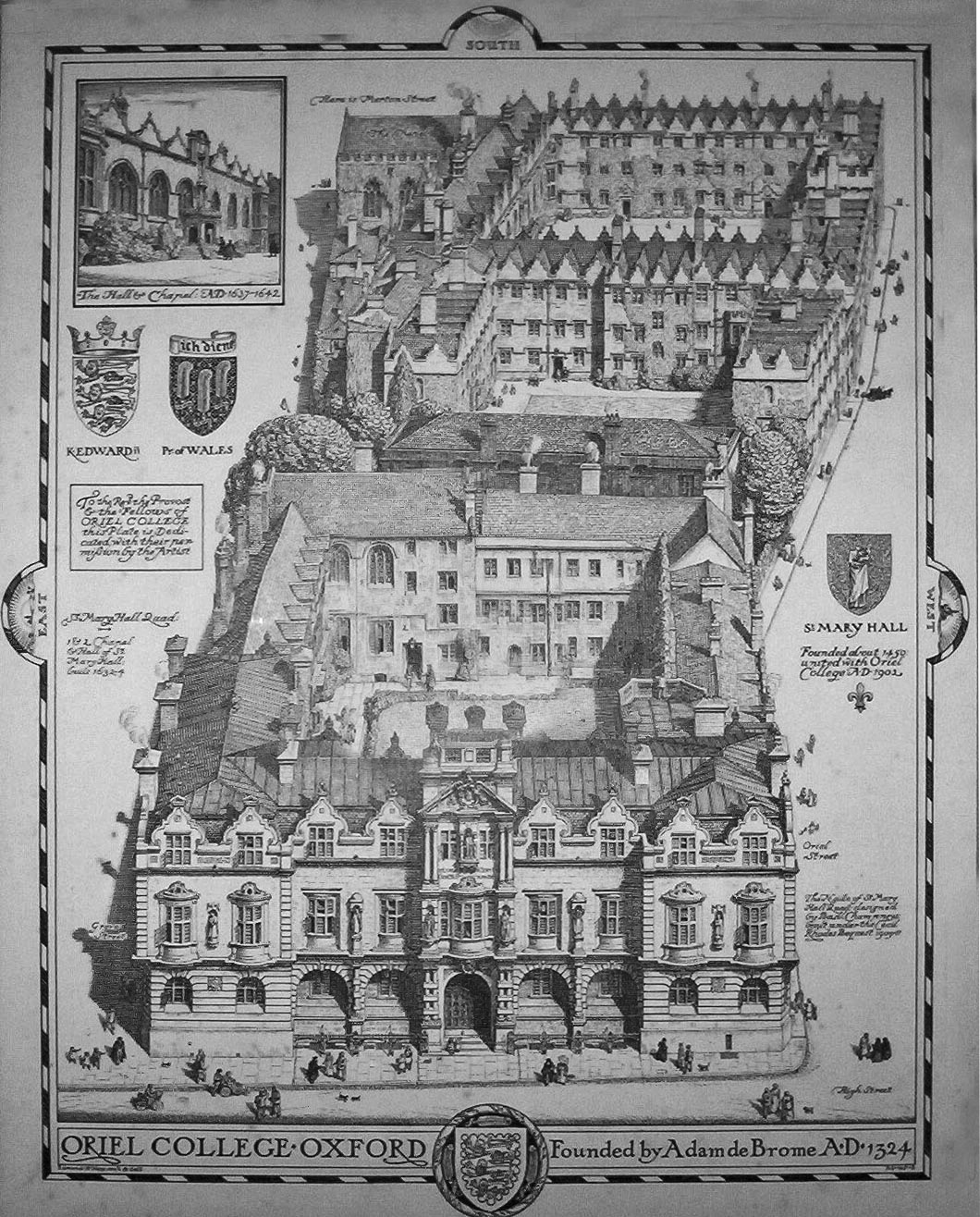
1919 photogravure of the college, looking south, after the completion of the Rhodes Building (in the foreground)

In the early 19th century, the reforming zeal of Provosts John Eveleigh and Edward Copleston gained Oriel a reputation as the most brilliant college of the day. It was the centre of the "Oriel Noetics" – clerical liberals such as Richard Whately and Thomas Arnold were fellows, and during the 1830s, two intellectually eminent fellows of Oriel, John Keble and Saint John Henry Newman, supported by Canon Pusey (also an Oriel fellow initially, later at Christ Church) and others, formed a group known as the Oxford Movement, alternatively as the Tractarians, or familiarly as the Puseyites. The group was disgusted by the then Church of England and sought to revive the spirit of early Christianity. Tension arose in college since Provost Edward Hawkins was a determined opponent of the Movement.

During the First World War, a wall was built dividing Third Quad from Second Quad to accommodate members of Somerville College in St Mary's Hall while their college buildings were being used as a military hospital. At that time Oxford separated male and female students as far as possible; Vera Brittain, one of the Somerville students, recalled an amusing occurrence during her time there in her autobiography, Testament of Youth:

[...] the few remaining undergraduates in the still masculine section of Oriel not unnaturally concluded that it would be a first-rate "rag" to break down the wall which divided them from the carefully guarded young females in St. Mary Hall. Great perturbation filled the souls of the Somerville dons when they came down to breakfast one morning to find that a large gap had suddenly appeared in the protecting masonry, through which had been thrust a hilarious placard:

"'OO MADE THIS 'ERE 'OLE?"

"MICE!!!"

Throughout that day and the following night the Senior Common Room, from the Principal downwards, took it in turns to sit on guard beside the hole, for fear any unruly spirit should escape through it to the forbidden adventurous males on the other side.

In 1985, the college became the last all-male college in Oxford to start to admit women for matriculation as undergraduates. In 1984, the Senior Common Room voted 23–4 to admit women undergraduates from 1986. The Junior Common Room president believed that "the distinctive character of the college will be undermined".

A second feast day was added in 2007 by a benefaction from George Moody, formerly of Oriel, to be celebrated on or near St George's Day (23 April). The only remaining gaudy had then been Candlemas; the new annual dinner was to be known as the St. George's Day Gaudy. The dinner is black tie and gowns, and by request of the benefactor, the main course will normally be goose.

=== 17 November 2026 Protest (Siege of Oriel) ===
On 17 November 2026, Oriel College became the scene of a large riot against a lecture by academic Nathan Cofnas, entitled An Evening with Nathan Cofnas: Is DEI Undermining Higher Education?, organised by the Oxford University Reform Society. The riot, involving hundreds of protesters, was organised by anti-racism groups including Stand Up to Racism, Oxford Resist and Black Lives Matter UK. A petition opposing the event had attracted more than 30,000 signatures.

The lecture had originally been scheduled to take place in the Harris Lecture Theatre. However, following safety concerns arising from the demonstration and the security situation outside the college, the venue was changed to the Senior Library. Additional security arrangements were introduced, including restrictions on access to the college and the presence of private security personnel and University security staff.

Protesters began gathering in Oriel Square during the afternoon around 5pm, with numbers increasing to several hundred. Riotors carried placards and chanted slogans opposing Cofnas's views on race and intelligence. Some placards commemorated Cambridge professor Jason Arday, calling him a "saint" and a "man of great intelligence."

As the evening progressed, demonstrators formed human cordons around the college's entrances, linking arms to prevent ticket holders from entering and members of the college from leaving. Protesters attempted to force their way through the college's entrances, while some climbed over the college's walls into its grounds. At approximately 6 pm, protesters breached the college's main gate, although college staff succeeded in closing it again. Protestors began using the metal barricades as battering rams against the college doors.

During the confrontation at the college entrance, Oriel's Provost, Lord Mendoza, was photographed personally holding the entrance door shut against demonstrators attempting to force their way inside. His intervention, in which he physically helped to defend the college entrance, became one of the notable images associated with the incident.

The blockade prevented some Oriel students from entering or leaving the college. Students who had intended to attend the lecture were also prevented from gaining access.

An internal protest took place in the college's Second Quad, where students displayed placards opposing Cofnas's views. This initially was meant to be a silent protest, but students did not follow this request from the college.

The lecture went ahead in the Senior Library at approximately 6 pm, despite the disruption outside. Only approximately 30 people attended. Attendance was substantially reduced because protesters had blockaded the college entrances, preventing many ticket holders from gaining access to the event. Protest chants could be heard inside the building during the lecture, requiring Cofnas to use a microphone. He subsequently answered questions from attendees.

The situation escalated further during the lecture, with protesters continuing to blockade the college's entrances and some demonstrators climbing into Second Quad from Oriel Street. Thames Valley Police officers entered the college grounds and clashed with protesters as they attempted to restore access. A member of the college's portering staff was injured during an altercation. Police eventually dispersed the remaining demonstrators, and the crowds had largely left the area by approximately 9:30 pm.

== Buildings and environs ==
=== First Quad (Front Quad) ===
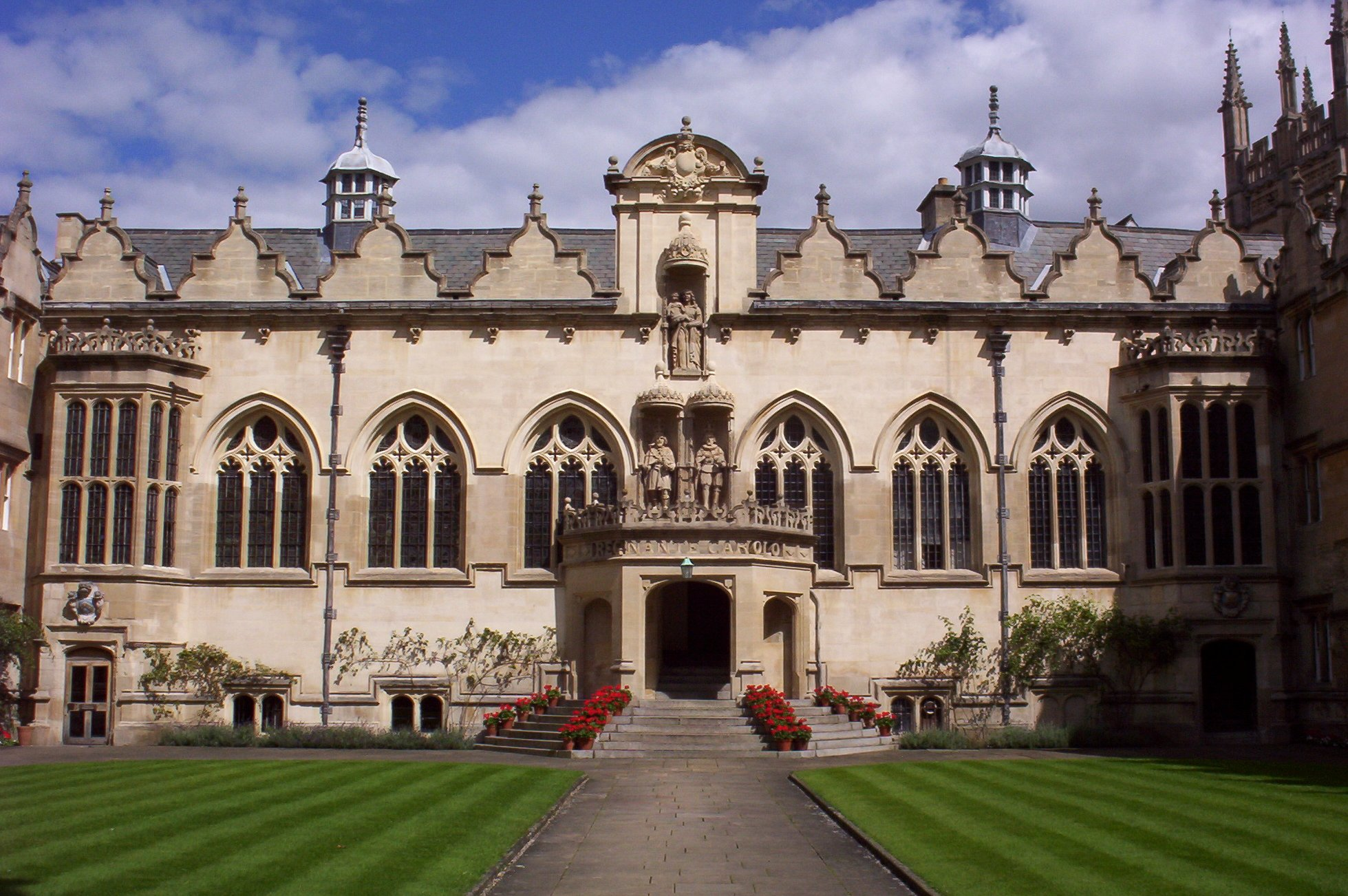
East range of First Quad; the ornate portico in the centre leads into a hall, the doors on either side lead to the undercroft (left) and chapel (right).

The Oriel Street site was acquired between 1329 and 1392. Nothing survives of the original buildings, La Oriole and the smaller St Martin's Hall in the south-east; both were demolished before the quadrangle was built in the artisan mannerist style during the 17th century. The south and west ranges and the gate tower were built around 1620 to 1622; the north and east ranges and the chapel buildings date from 1637 to 1642. The façade of the east range forms a classical E shape comprising the college chapel, hall and undercroft. The exterior and interior of the ranges are topped by an alternating pattern of decorative gables. The gate house has a Perpendicular portal and canted Gothic oriel windows, with fan vaulting in the entrance. The room above has a particularly fine plaster ceiling and chimney piece of stucco caryatids and panelling interlaced with studded bands sprouting into large flowers.

==== Hall ====
In the centre of the east range, the portico of the hall entrance commemorates its construction during the reign of Charles I with the legend Regnante Carolo, 'Charles, being king', in capital letters in pierced stonework. The portico was completely rebuilt in 1897, and above it are statues of two kings: Edward II, the college's founder, on the left, and probably either Charles I or James I, although this is disputed; above those is a statue of the Blessed Virgin Mary, after whom the college is officially named. The top breaks the Jacobean tradition and has classical pilasters, a shield with garlands, and a segmental pediment.

The hall has a hammerbeam roof and a louvre in the centre, which was originally the means of escape for smoke rising from a fireplace in the centre of the floor. The wooden panelling was designed by Ninian Comper and was erected in 1911 in place of some previous 19th-century Gothic type, though even earlier panelling, dating from 1710, is evident in the buttery.

Behind the high table is a portrait of Edward II; underneath is a longsword brought to the college in 1902 after being preserved for many years on one of the college's estates at Swainswick, near Bath. On either side are portraits of Sir Walter Raleigh and Joseph Butler. The other portraits around the hall include other prominent members of Oriel such as Matthew Arnold, Thomas Arnold, James Anthony Froude, John Keble, John Henry Newman, Richard Whately and John Robinson. In 2002, the college commissioned one of the largest portraits of Queen Elizabeth II, measuring 92 by 58 inches (230 by 150 cm), from Jeff Stultiens to hang in the hall; the painting was unveiled the following year. The stained glass in the windows display the coats of arms of benefactors and distinguished members of the college; three of the windows were designed by Ninian Comper. The window next to the entrance on the east side contains the arms of Regius Professors of Modern History who have been ex officio fellows of the college.

==== Chapel ====
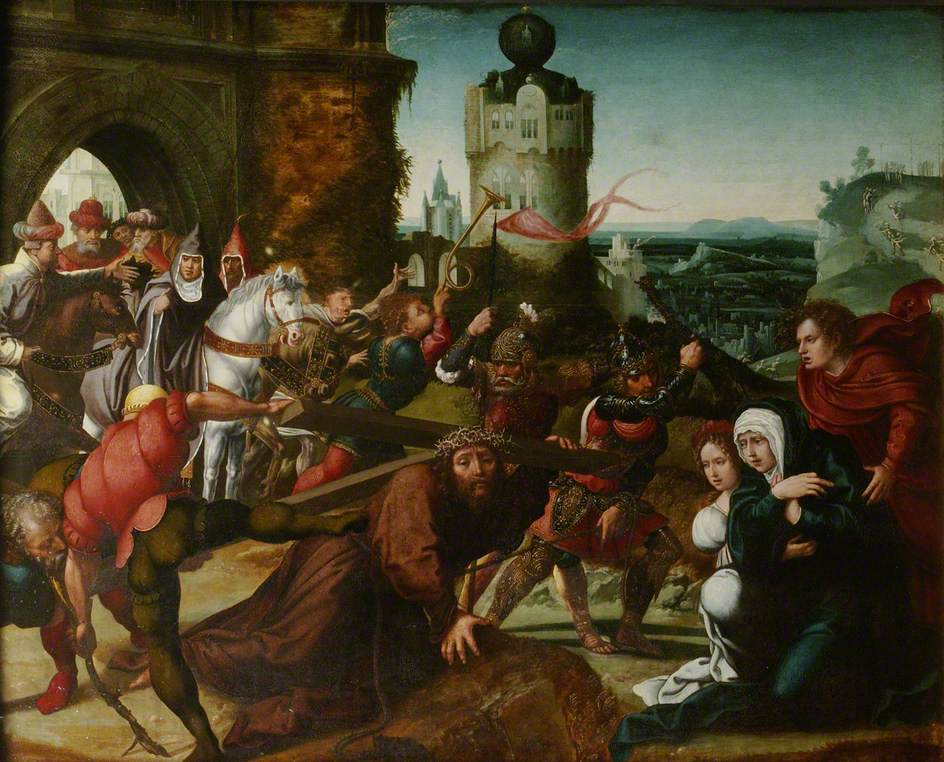
Bernard van Orley's Christ Falls, with the Cross, before a City Gate, which hangs in the chapel

The current chapel is Oriel's third, the first being built around 1373 on the north side of First Quadrangle. By 1566, the chapel was located on the south side of the quadrangle, as shown in a drawing made for Elizabeth I's visit to Oxford in that year. The present building was consecrated in 1642 and despite subsequent restorations it largely retains its original appearance.

The bronze lectern was given to the college in 1654. The black and white marble paving dates from 1677 to 1678. Except for the pews on the west, dating from 1884, the panelling, stalls and screens are all 17th-century, as are the altar and carved communion rails. Behind the altar is the oil-on-panel painting The Carrying of the Cross, also titled Christ Falls, with the Cross, before a City Gate, by the Flemish Renaissance painter Bernard van Orley. A companion piece to the painting is in the National Gallery of Scotland. The organ case dates from 1716; originally designed by Christopher Schreider for St Mary Abbots Church, Kensington, it was acquired by Oriel in 1884.

Above the entrance to the chapel is an oriel that, until the 1880s, was a room on the first floor that formed part of a set of rooms that were occupied by Richard Whately, and later by Saint John Henry Newman. Whately is said to have used the space as a larder and Newman is said to have used it for his private prayers – when the organ was installed in 1884, the space was used for the blower. The wall that once separated the room from the ante-chapel was removed, making it accessible from the chapel. The organ was built by J. W. Walker & Sons in 1988; in 1991 the space behind the organ was rebuilt as an oratory and memorial to Newman and the Oxford Movement. A new stained-glass window designed by Vivienne Haig and realised by Douglas Hogg was completed and installed in 2001.

During the late 1980s, the chapel was extensively restored with the assistance of donations from Lady Norma Dalrymple-Champneys. During this work, the chandelier, given in 1885 by Provost Shadwell while still a fellow, was put back in place, the organ was restored, the painting mounted behind the altar, and the chapel repainted. A list of former chaplains and organ scholars was erected in the ante-chapel.

=== Second Quad (Back Quad) ===
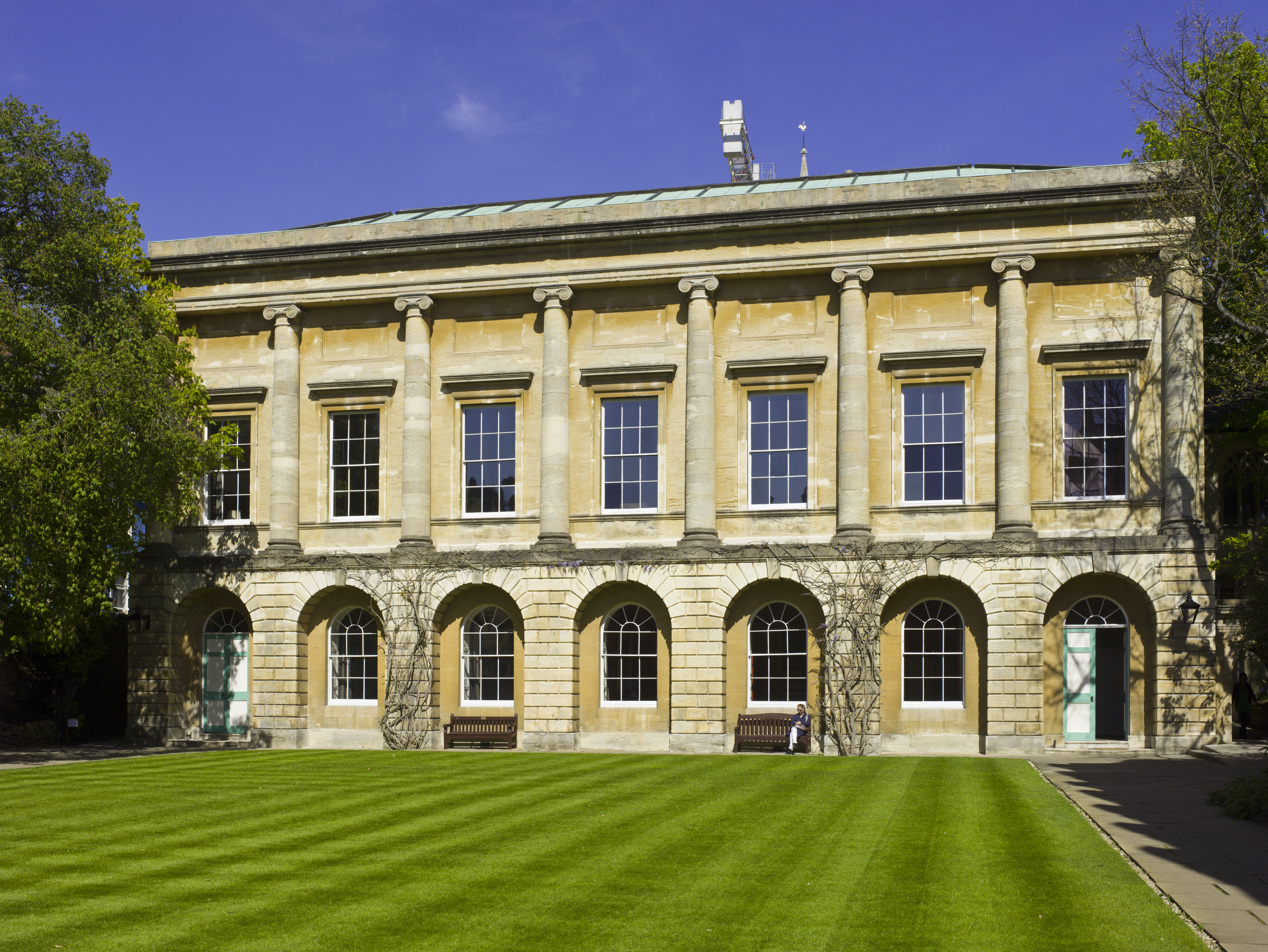
Designed by James Wyatt and completed in 1796, this building houses the senior common rooms and library.

Originally a garden, the demand for more accommodation for undergraduates in the early 18th century resulted in two free-standing blocks being built. The first block erected was the Robinson Building on the east side, built in 1720 by Bishop Robinson at the suggestion of his wife, as the inscription over the door records. Its twin block, the Carter Building, was erected on the west side in 1729, as a result of a benefaction by Provost Carter. The two buildings stood for nearly a hundred years as detached blocks in the garden, and the architectural elements of First Quad are repeated on them – only here the seven gables are all alike. Between 1817 and 1819, they were joined up to First Quad with their present, rather incongruous connecting links. In the link to the Robinson Building, two purpose-built rooms have been incorporated – the Champneys Room, designed by Weldon Champneys, the nephew of Basil Champneys, and the Benefactors Room, a panelled room honouring benefactors of the college. A Gothic oriel window, belonging to the provost's lodgings, was added to the Carter Building in 1826.

==== Library ====
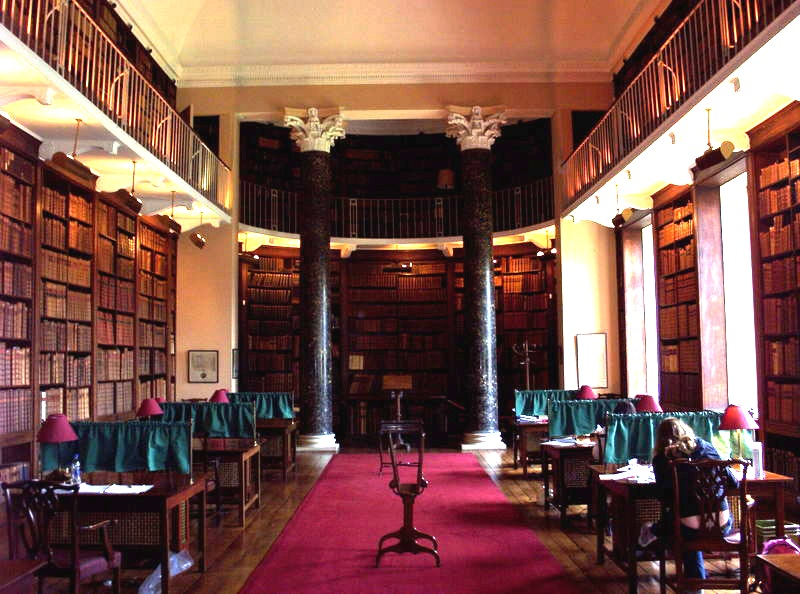
On the first floor of James Wyatt's building, the senior library, looking east

The north range of the Second Quad houses the library and senior common rooms; designed in the Neoclassical style by James Wyatt, it was built between 1788 and 1796 to accommodate the books bequeathed by Edward, Baron Leigh, formerly High Steward of the university and an Orielensis, whose gift had doubled the size of the library. The two-storey building has rusticated arches on the ground floor and a row of Ionic columns above, dividing the façade into seven bays – the ground floor contains the first purpose-built senior common rooms in Oxford, above is the library.

On 7 March 1949, a fire spread from the library roof; over 300 printed books and the manuscripts on exhibition were completely destroyed, and over 3,000 books needed repair, though the main structure suffered little damage and restoration took less than a year.

=== Third Quad (St Mary's Quad) ===
The south, east and west ranges of Third Quadrangle contain elements of St Mary Hall, which was incorporated into Oriel in 1902; less than a decade later, the Hall's buildings on the northern side were demolished for the construction of the Rhodes Building. Bedel Hall in the south was formally amalgamated with St Mary Hall in 1505.

In the south range, parts of the medieval buildings survive and are incorporated into staircase ten – the straight, steep flight of stairs and timber-framed partitions date from a mid-15th century rebuilding of St Mary Hall. The former Chapel, Hall and Buttery of St Mary Hall, built in 1640, form part of the Junior Library. Viewed from Third Quad, the chapel, with its Gothic windows, can be seen to have been built neatly on top of the Hall, a unique example in Oxford of such a plan.

On the east side of the quad is a simple rustic style timber-frame building; known as "the Dolls' House", it was erected by Principal King in 1743.

In 1826 an ornate range was erected by St Mary Hall in the Gothic Revival style, incorporating the old gate of St Mary Hall, on the west side of the quad. Designed by Daniel Robertson, it contains two quite ornate oriels placed asymmetrically, one is of six lights, the other four. They are the best example of the pre-archaeological Gothic in Oxford. The large oriel on the first floor at the north end was once the drawing room window of the Principal of the Hall. Parts of the street wall incorporated into this range show traces of blocked windows dating from the same period of rebuilding in the 15th century as the present-day staircase ten.

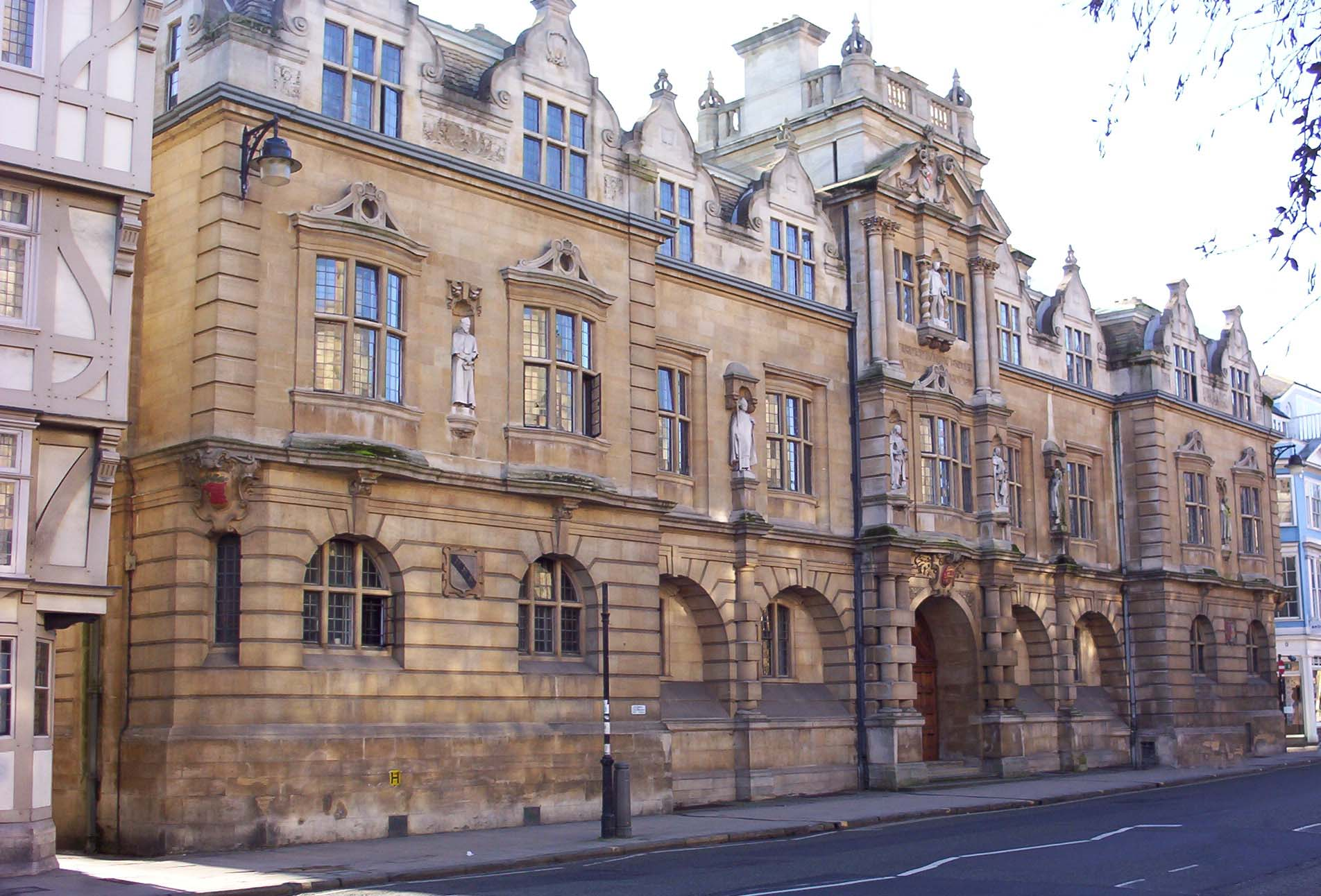
Statues of Cecil Rhodes, Edward VII and George V on the central bay of the Rhodes Building's High Street façade

The Rhodes Building, pictured, was built in 1911 using £100,000 left to the college for that purpose by former student Cecil Rhodes. It was designed by Basil Champneys and stands on the site of the house of the St Mary Hall Principal, on the High Street. Champneys's first proposal for the building included an open arcade to the High Street, a domed central feature and balustraded parapet. The left hand block and much of the centre was to be given up to a new provost's lodging, and the five windows on the first floor above the arcade were to light a gallery belonging to the lodging. The college eventually decided to retain the existing provost's lodging and demanded detailing "more in accordance with the style which has become traditional in Oxford". It became the last building of the Jacobean revival style in Oxford.

The staircases of the interior façade are decorated with cartouches similar to those found in First Quad, and likewise bear the arms of important figures in the college's history; (13) Sir Walter Raleigh who was an undergraduate from 1572 to 1574, (14) John Keble who was a fellow between 1811 and 1835, (archway) Edward Hawkins who was provost from 1828 until 1882 and (15) Gilbert White who was an undergraduate from 1739 until 1743 and a fellow from 1744 until 1793.

The building was not entirely well received; William Sherwood, Mayor of Oxford and Master of Magdalen College School, wrote: "Oriel [has] broken out into the High, ... destroying a most picturesque group of old houses in so doing, and, to put it gently, hardly compensating us for their removal."

==== Statue of Cecil Rhodes ====
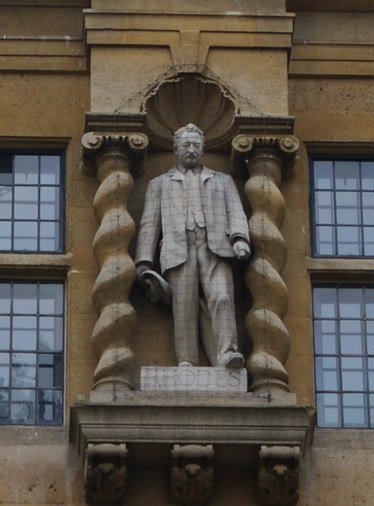
The statue of Rhodes

On the side facing the High Street, there is a statue of Oriel graduate Cecil Rhodes over the main entrance, with Edward VII and George V beneath. These formed part of a group of seven statues commissioned for the building from the sculptor Henry Pegram. The inscription reads: "e Larga MVnIfICentIa CaeCILII rhoDes", which, as well as acknowledging Rhodes's munificence, is a chronogram giving the date of construction, 1911.

The statue has been the subject of protests for several years in the wake of the Rhodes Must Fall movement in 2015. Hundreds of protestors again demanded its removal in June 2020, in the wake of the removal of the statue of Edward Colston in Bristol a few days previously. The statues had been targeted during the protests that arose following the murder of George Floyd in the United States. On 20 May 2021, however, the college decided not to remove the statue despite the majority of members of a commission to decide its future recommending removal; Oriel College cited costs and "complex" planning procedures. Roughly 150 Oxford lecturers stated they will not teach Oriel students more than is required in their contracts in protest at the decision to keep the statue.

=== Island Site (O'Brien Quad) ===
This is a convex quadrilateral of buildings, bordered by the High Street, and the meeting of Oriel Street and King Edward Street in Oriel Square. The site took six hundred years to acquire and although it contains teaching rooms and the Harris Lecture Theatre, it is largely given over to accommodation.

On the High Street, No. 106 and 107 stand on the site of Tackley's Inn; built around 1295, it was the first piece of property that Adam de Brome acquired when he began to found the college in 1324. It comprised a hall and chambers leased to scholars, behind a frontage of five shops, with the scholars above and a cellar of five bays below. The hall, which was open to the roof, was 33 feet (10 m) long, 20 feet (6.1 m) wide, and about 22 feet (6.7 m) high; at the east end was a large chamber with another chamber above it. The south wall of the building, which survives, was partly of stone and contains a large two-light early 14th-century window. The cellar below is of the same date and is the best preserved medieval cellar in Oxford; originally entered by stone steps from the street, it has a stone vault divided into four sections by two diagonal ribs, with carved corbels.

No. 12 Oriel Street, now staircases 19 and 20, is the oldest tenement acquired by the college; known as Kylyngworth's, it was granted to the college in 1392 by Thomas de Lentwardyn, fellow and later provost, having previously been let to William de Daventre, Oriel's fourth provost, in 1367. A back wing to the property was added around 1600 and further work to the front was conducted in 1724–1738. In 1985, funded by a gift from Edgar O'Brien and £10,000 from the Pilgrim Trust, Kylyngworth's was refurbished along with Nos. 10, 9 and 7.

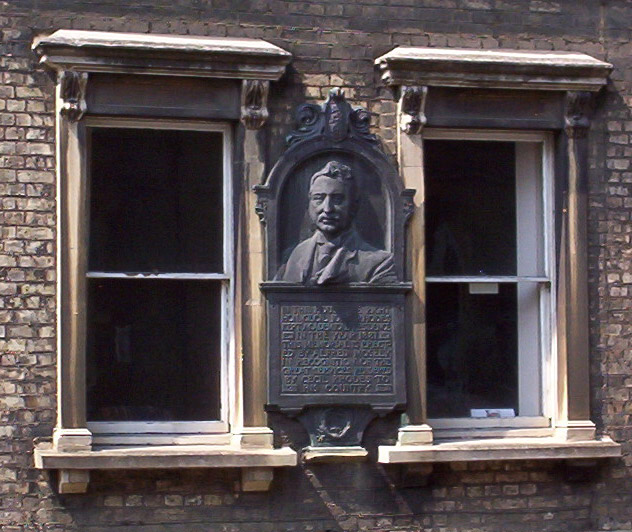
On the first floor of No. 6 King Edward Street is a portrait bust of former student and benefactor Cecil Rhodes.

King Edward Street was created by the college between 1872 and 1873 when 109 and 110 High Street were demolished. The old shops on each side of the road were pulled down and rebuilt, and to preserve the continuity, the new shops were numbered 108 and 109–112. Named after the college's founder, the road was opened in 1873. On the wall of the first floor of No. 6, there is a large metal plaque with a portrait of Cecil Rhodes; underneath is the inscription:

In this house, the Rt. Hon Cecil John Rhodes kept academical residence in the year 1881. This memorial is erected by Alfred Mosely in recognition of the great services rendered by Cecil Rhodes to his country.

In the centre of the quad is the Harris Building, formerly Oriel court, a real tennis court where Charles I played tennis with his nephew Prince Rupert in December 1642 and King Edward VII had his first tennis lesson in 1859. The building was in use as a lecture hall by 1923, and after modernisation between 1991 and 1994, funded by Sir Philip and Lady Harris, contains accommodation, a seminar room and the college's main lecture theatre. The bronze plaque in the lobby commemorates his father, Captain Charles William Harris, after whom the building is named. The building was opened by John Major, then Prime Minister, on 10 August 1993.

=== Rectory Road ===
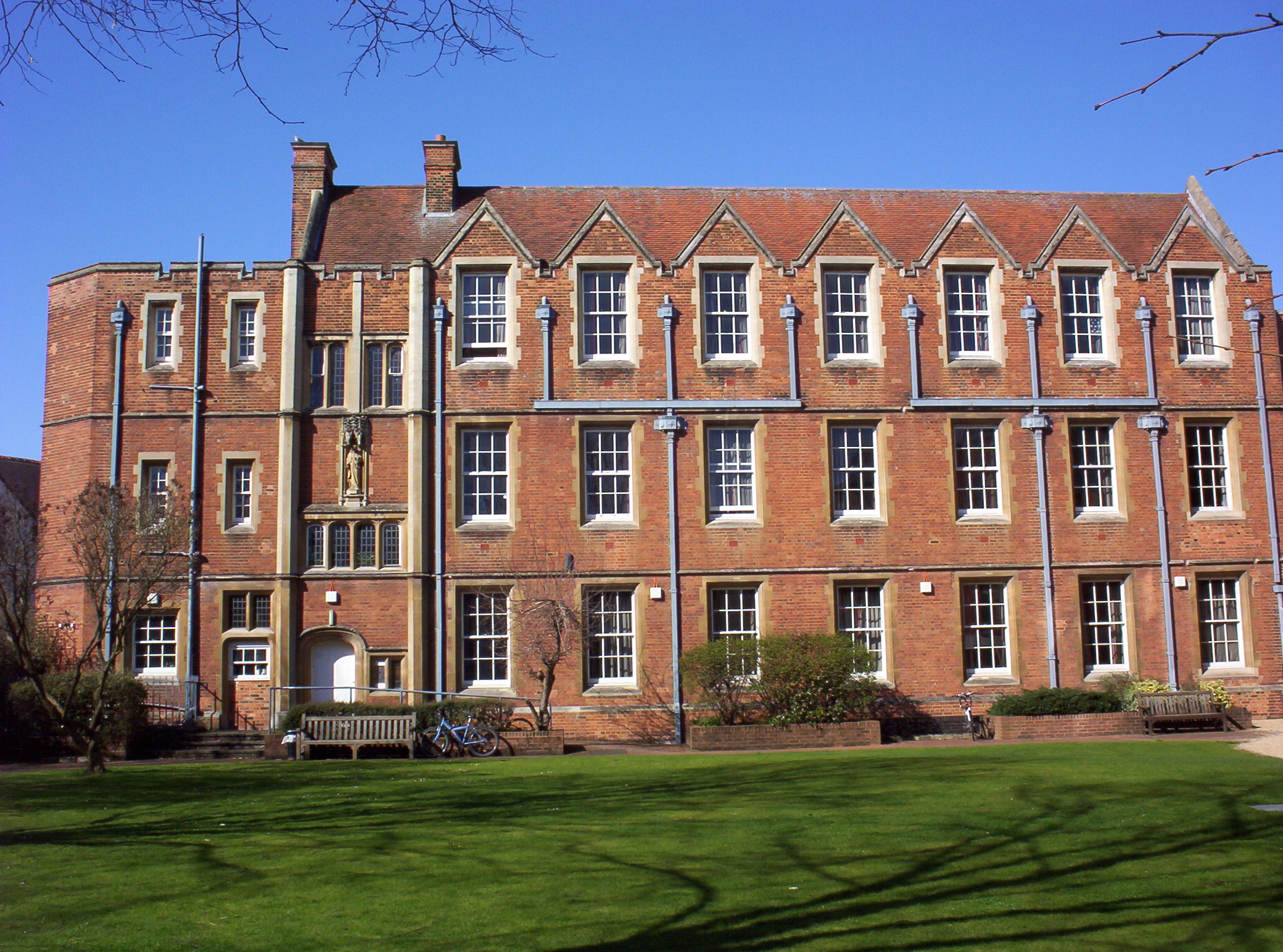
Rectory Road's Goldie Wing is one of the remaining buildings of a former convent.

Bordered by the Cowley Road, this site was formerly Nazareth House, a residential care home convent – Goldie Wing and Larmenier House are its surviving buildings. Nazareth House itself was demolished to make room for two purpose-built halls of residence, James Mellon Hall and David Paterson House. The two new halls were opened by Queen Elizabeth II on 8 November 2000.

Due to its short walk from the college, it has become the principal choice of accommodation for Oriel's graduates and finalists. The site has its own common rooms, squash court, gymnasium and support staff.

=== Bartlemas ===
Bartlemas is a conservation area that incorporates the remaining buildings of a leper hospital founded by Henry I; it includes the sports grounds for Oriel, Jesus and Lincoln Colleges, along with landscaping for wildlife and small scale urban development.

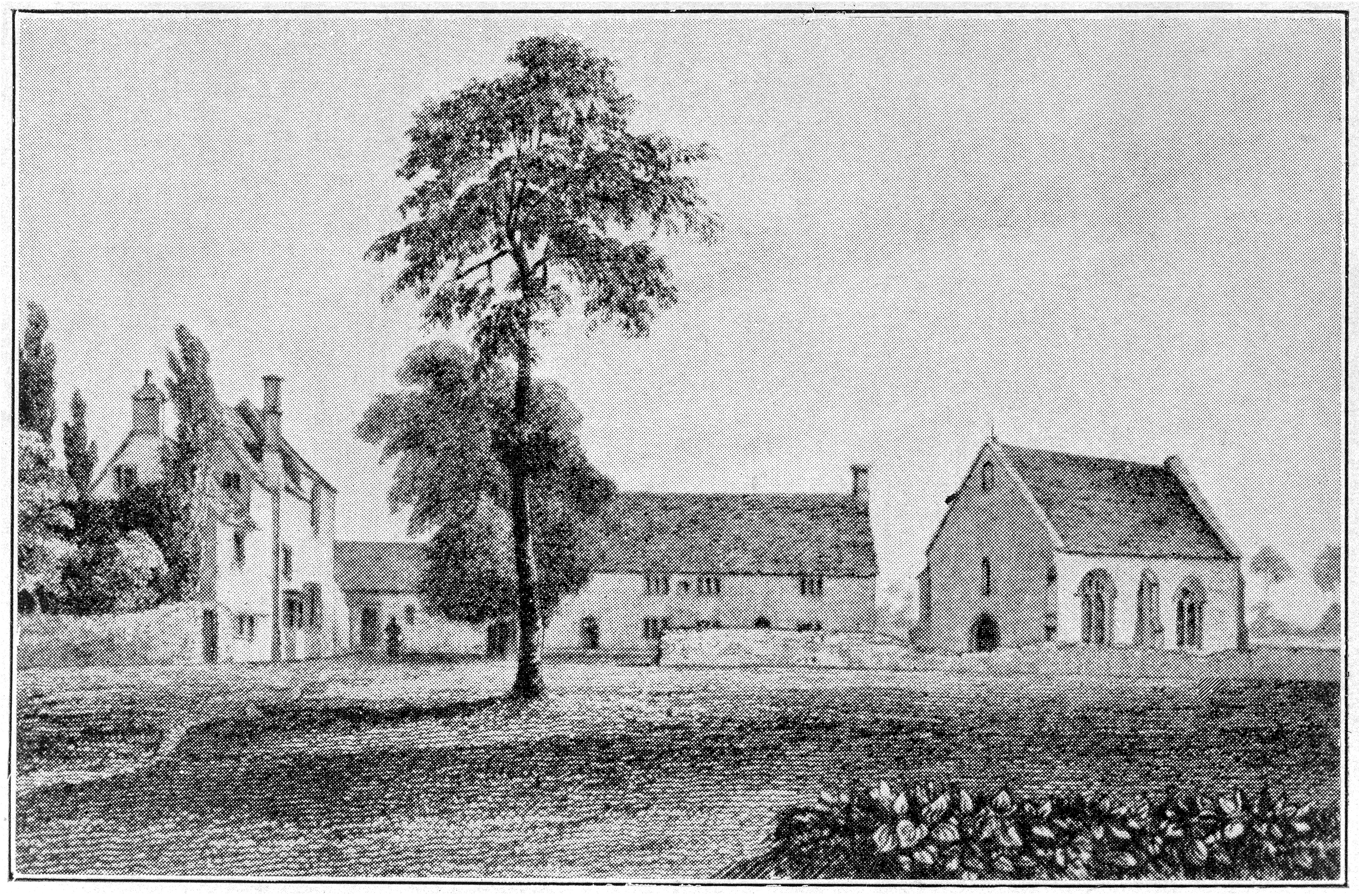
Old leper Hospital of St. Bartholomew, Oxford

In 1326 Provost Adam de Brome was appointed warden of St Bartholomew's; a leper hospital in Cowley Marsh, the hospital was later granted to the college by Edward III, along with the payments it had been receiving from the fee farm. It was increasingly used as a rest house for sick members of the college needing a change of air. In 1649 the college rebuilt the main hospital range north of the chapel, destroyed in the Civil War, as a row of four almshouses, called Bartlemas House. Bartlemas Chapel and two farm cottages are the other extant buildings.

=== Filming location ===
The buildings of Oriel College were used as a location for Hugh Grant's first film, Privileged (1982), as well as Oxford Blues (1984), True Blue (1991) and The Dinosaur Hunter (2000). The television crime series Inspector Morse used the college in the episodes "Ghost in the Machine" (under the name of "Courtenay College"), "The Silent World of Nicholas Quinn", "The Infernal Serpent", "Deadly Slumber", "Twilight of the Gods" and "Death is now My Neighbour", and in the one-off follow on, Lewis, the Middle Common Room and Oriel Square were used. In the ITV crime drama Chancer, the third quad was used in the episode "Trust" (1990).

== Heraldry ==
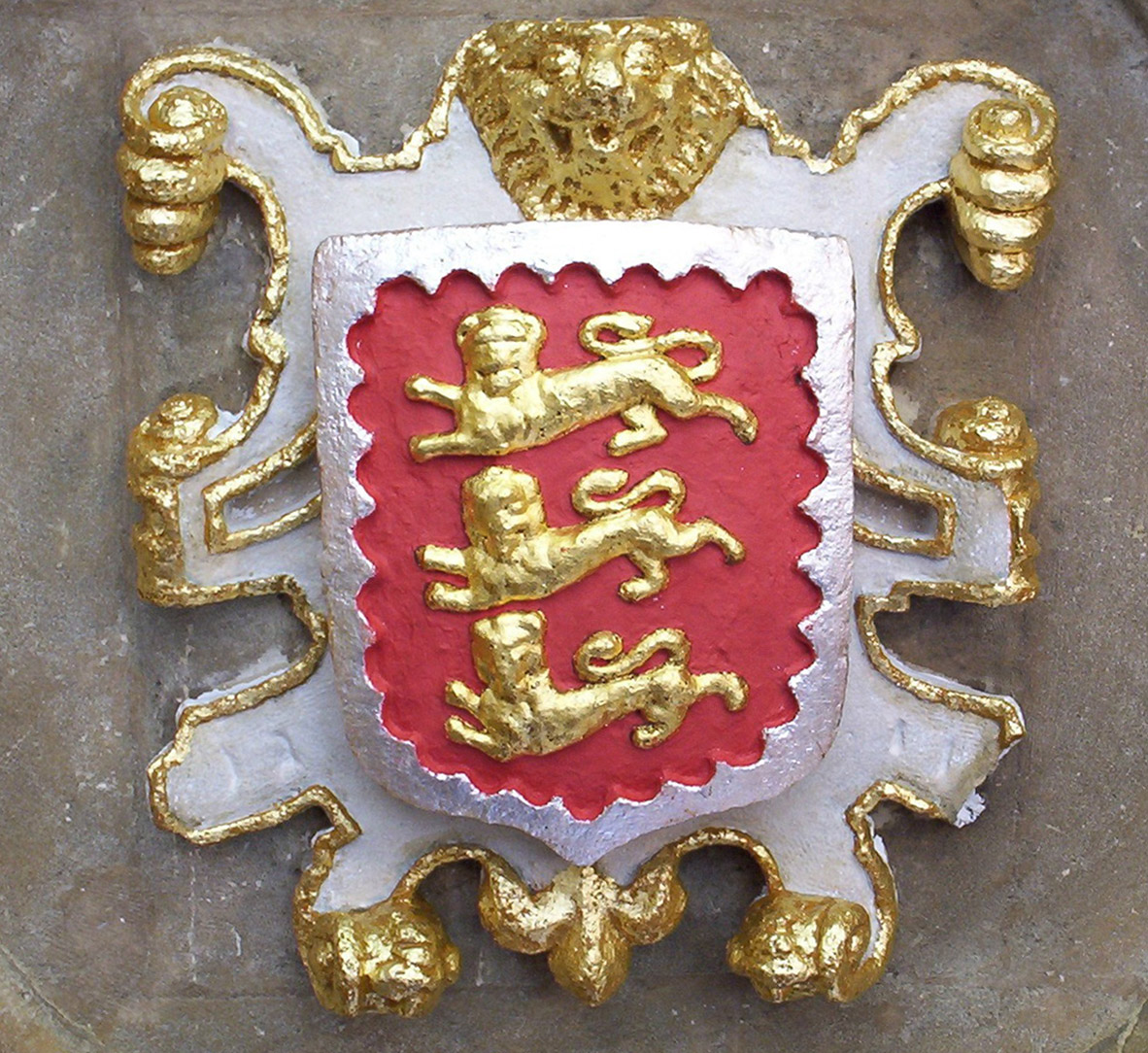
Oriel's coat of arms on a roof boss

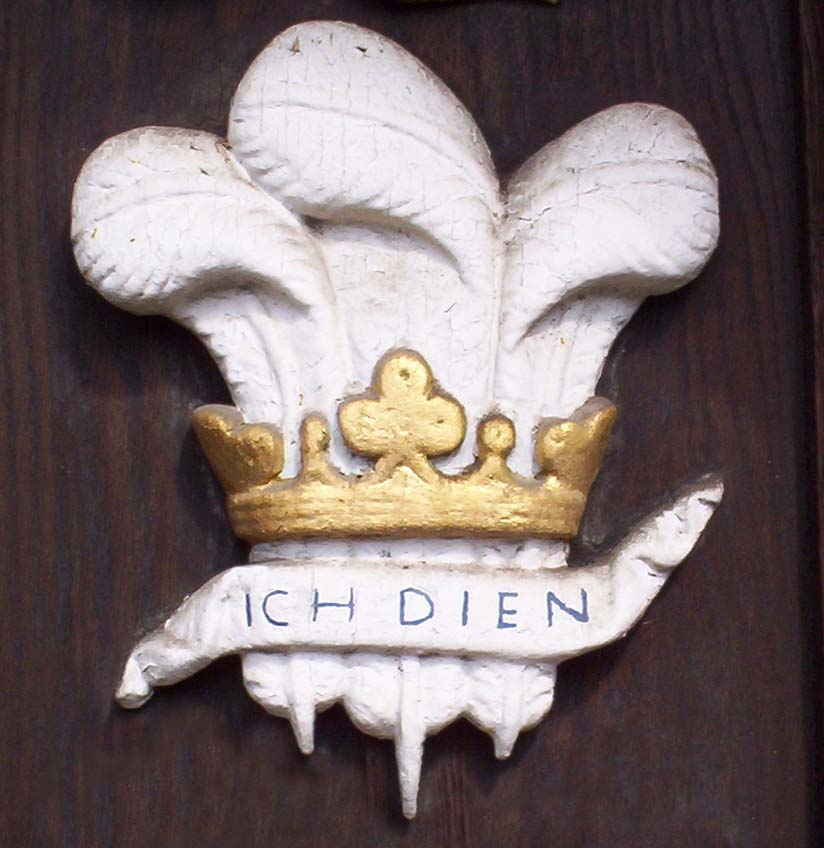
Relief sculpture of the Prince of Wales's feathers, a heraldic badge used by the college, on the main gate

The college's coat of arms are blazoned: "Gules, three lions passant guardant or within a bordure engrailed argent". In recognition of Oriel's foundation by King Edward II, the arms are based on the royal arms of England, which also feature three lions, with a bordure added as a mark of difference. The blazoning was recorded at the Visitation of 1574.

The Prince of Wales's feathers, often adopted as insignia by members of the college, appear as decorative elements within the college buildings and appear on the official college tie. It probably represents Edward, the Black Prince, Prince of Wales, who first adopted the device, the senior grandson of King Edward II, although it may represent King Charles I, who was Prince of Wales when the building of First Quad began in the 17th century.

In 2009, the College of Arms granted the college the use of a heraldic badge, particularly for the boat club and the Tortoise Club, a society of college rowing alumni. The badge is blazoned: "A tortoise displayed the shell circular azure charged with two concentric annulets argent".

== Prayer and graces ==
One of the following two college prayers is recited by the provost or the senior fellow present at the conclusion of Evensong on Sundays and other services:

Modern:

O merciful God and Father, from whom the whole family in Heaven and Earth is named, who art always to be praised both in the living and in the dead: we give Thee hearty thanks for our memorable Founder Edward II, Adam de Brome and all other our Benefactors; and we beseech Thee that we may rightly use the advantages afforded in this place by their munificence; and this life ended, may with them be made partakers of the glorious resurrection to the Life Everlasting; through Jesus Christ our Lord. Amen.

Traditional:

Lord God, the resurrection and the life of all who believe, who art always to be praised both in the living and in the dead, we give Thee hearty thanks for our memorable Founder Edward II, Adam De Brome our principal Benefactor, and all other our Benefactors, by whose benefits we are here maintained in godliness and learning; and we beseech Thee that, using Thy gifts rightly, we may be led to the immortal glory of the resurrection, through Jesus Christ our Lord. Amen.

A full list of benefactors is read out on certain occasions, including Commemoration Sunday and at services before gaudies.

Before Formal Hall, the following Latin ante cibum grace is recited by a student Bible clerk. The translation is reputedly by Erasmus in his Convivium Religiosum of a grace recorded by Saint John Chrysostom:

Benedicte Deus, qui pascis nos a iuventute nostra et praebes cibum omni carni, reple gaudio et laetitia corda nostra, ut nos, affatim quod satis est habentes, abundemus in omne opus bonum. Per Jesum Christum Dominum nostrum, cui tecum et Spiritu Sancto sit omnis honos, laus et imperium in saecula saeculorum. Amen.

Blessed God, who feeds us from our youth and provides food for all flesh, fill our hearts with joy and gladness, that we, having enough to satisfy us, may abound in every good work. Through Jesus Christ our Lord, to whom with you and Holy Spirit, be all honour, praise and power for all ages. Amen.

After the meal, the provost or the presiding fellow may recite a short Latin prayer (Benedicto benedicatur, per Jesum Christum, Dominum nostrum. Amen; 'Let praise be given to/by the Blessed One, though Jesus Christ our Lord. Amen') instead of the following full post cibum grace:

Domine Deus, resurrectio et vita credentium, qui semper es laudandus tum in viventibus tum in defunctis, gratias tibi agimus pro Edvardo Secundo Fundatore nostro, pro Adamo de Brome praecipuo Benefactore, caeterisque Benefactoribus nostris, quorum beneficiis hic ad pietatem et ad studia bonarum literarum alimur: rogantes ut nos his donis tuis ad tuam gloriam recte utentes, una cum illis ad Resurrectionis gloriam immortalem perducamur, per Jesum Christum Dominum nostrum. Amen.

Lord God, the resurrection and life of all who believe in thee, who art always worthy to be praised by both the living and the dead, we give thee thanks for Edward the Second, our Founder; for Adam de Brome, our principal benefactor; and for all our other benefactors, by whose benefits we are here maintained in godliness and learning; and we beseech thee that, using these thy gifts rightly, we may be led to the immortal glory of the resurrection, through Jesus Christ our Lord. Amen.

== Student life ==
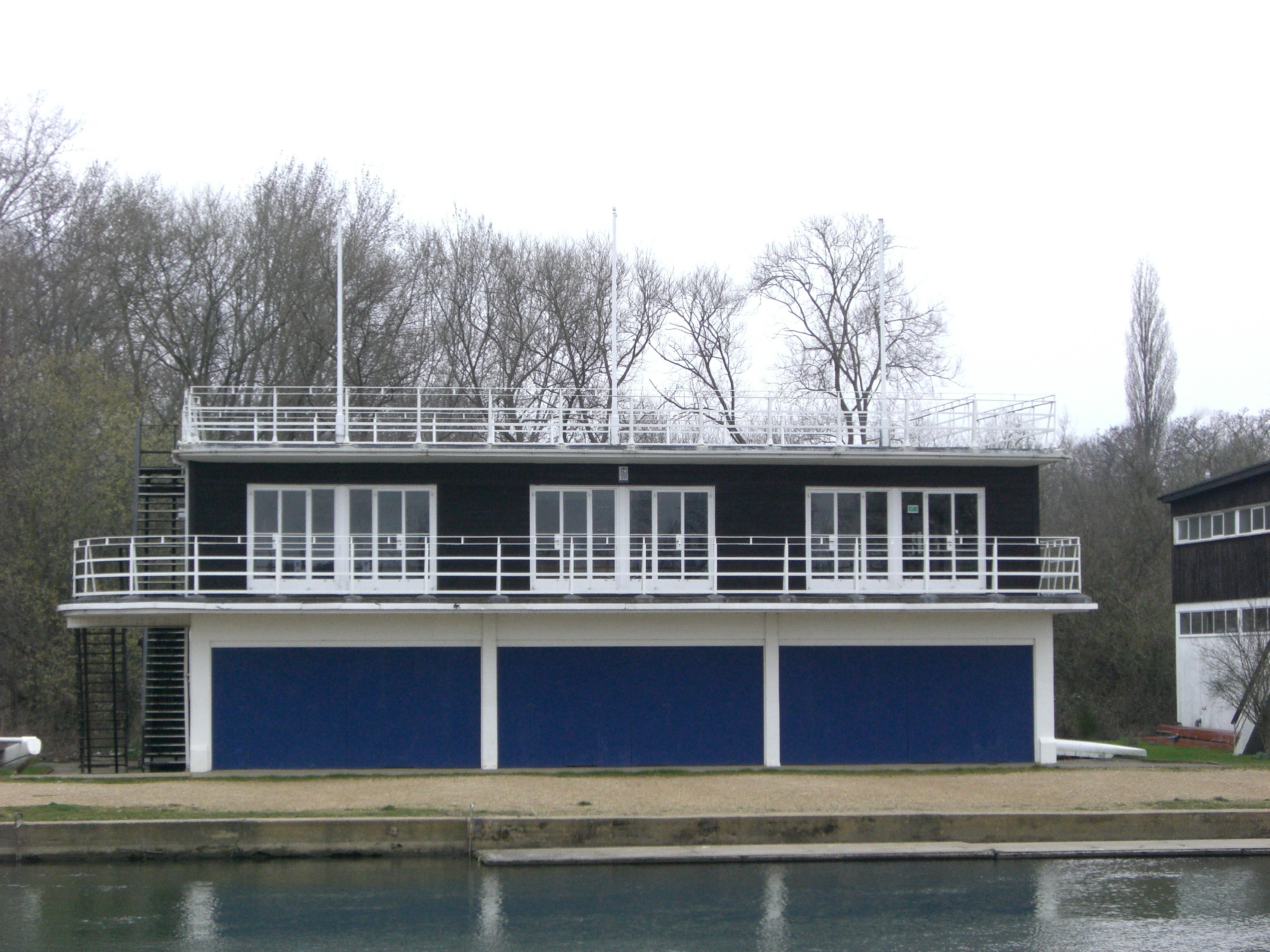
Oriel shares a boathouse with Lincoln and The Queen's Colleges.

Accommodation is provided for all undergraduates, and for some graduates, though some accommodation is off-site. Members are generally expected to dine in hall, where there are two sittings every evening, Informal Hall and Formal Hall, except on Saturdays, where there are no sittings.

Between 2001 and 2010, Oriel students chose not to be affiliated to the Oxford University Student Union. In a 2010 student referendum, the junior common room decided to re-affiliate. However, in 2013, in a fresh referendum, the Oriel JCR again voted to disaffiliate from OUSU.

=== Arts ===
Oriel has its own drama society, the Oriel Lions, which funds college and Oxford University shows.

The college also has its own student-run publication, The Poor Print, which publishes a range of content, including news, poetry, photography, science, comment, drawing, music, events and entertainment. Each issue is based around a theme, decided upon by the editors, and content comes from members of all common rooms and the college staff. Originally set up in 2013, the publication in its current guise was established in Michaelmas 2014 as an online-only magazine, with a fortnightly print edition then introduced in 2015.

=== Sport ===
Croquet may be played in St Mary quad in the summer, as can bowls on the south lawn of First Quad. The sports ground at Bartlemas is used for a variety of sports.

==== Rowing ====
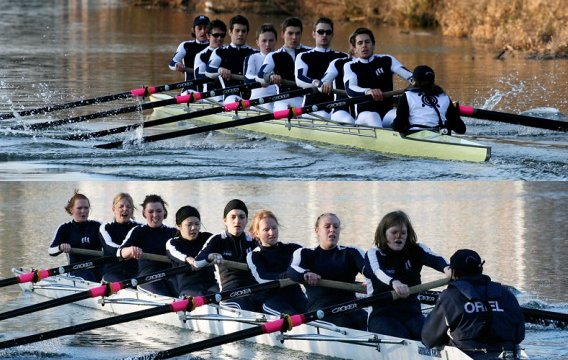
During the 2006 Torpids, the double headship winning Oriel Men's and Women's Eights maintained the college's reputation for success in rowing.

Rowing at the college is run by the Oriel College Boat Club, carried out from the college's own boat house near Christ Church Meadow. Oriel has had a reputation for its success in rowing, in particular the two intercollegiate bumps races, Torpids and Eights Week.

As of 2018, Oriel holds 33 Torpids men's headships, the most of any college. It also holds 32 Summer Eights Headships, second to Christ Church, at 33; from 1968 to 2018, Oriel won 25 headships. In 2006, Oriel claimed the first ever double headship in Torpids, rowing over as Head of the River in both the men's and women's first divisions. In 2018, the college repeated this victory with their second double headship. It remains the only college to have achieved a double headship in Torpids.

In addition to the Oxford-based races, Oriel crews compete in external events including the Head of the River Race, the Women's Eights Head of the River Race, the Henley Boat Races and regional events. In 2016 the men's first boat won the men's eights collegiate event at the Fairbairn Cup, it won again in 2017 and won the entire event in 2018.

In Tom Brown at Oxford by Thomas Hughes, Oriel's win in the 1842 Head of the River Race, with Oriel bumping Trinity, was re-written as Brown's college "St Ambrose" taking first place, with "Oriel" in second place.

== Associated people ==
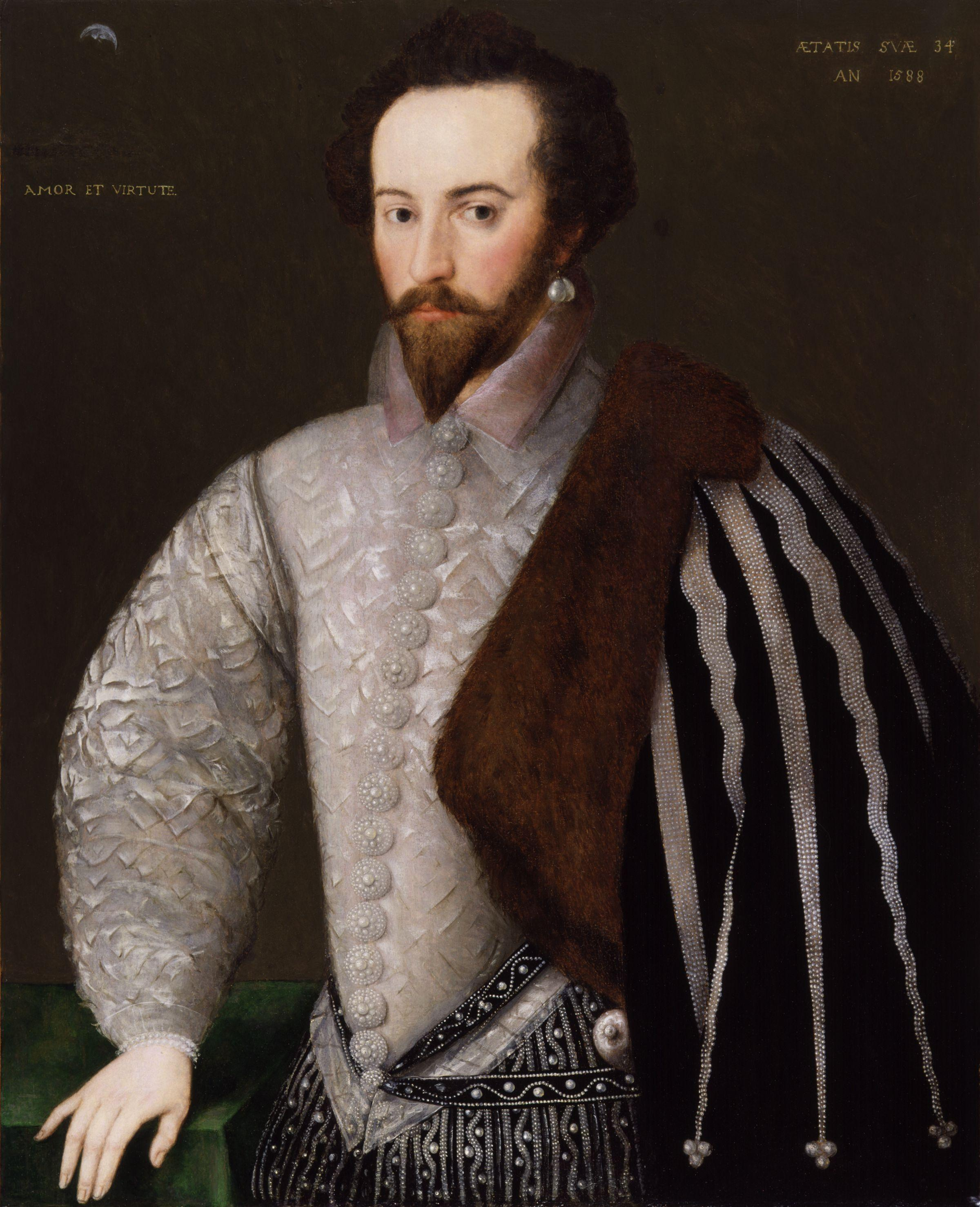
Oriel alumnus, Sir Walter Raleigh.

Oriel has produced many notable alumni, from statesmen and cricketers to industrialists; a notable undergraduate in the 16th century was Sir Walter Raleigh, an explorer during the Age of Discovery. At the graduate level, the college boasts as former fellows the principal founders of the Oxford Movement: John Keble, Edward Bouverie Pusey, and John Henry Newman. The college has produced many other churchmen, bishops, cardinals, governors, and two Nobel Prize recipients: Alexander Todd (Nobel Prize in Chemistry, 1957) and James Meade (Nobel Memorial Prize in Economic Sciences, 1977).

The professorial fellowships held by the college are the Regius Professor of Modern History, currently held by Lyndal Roper; the Oriel and Laing Professor of the Interpretation of Holy Scripture, currently held by Hindy Najman; the Nolloth Professor of the Philosophy of the Christian Religion, currently held by Mark Wynn; and the Nuffield Professor of Obstetrics and Gynaecology.

In the 1700s, Oriel attracted its first transatlantic students, sons of planters in the Colony of Virginia. One such student, Thomas Fairfax, 6th Lord Fairfax of Cameron, "came to regret giving a job to a young surveyor: George Washington".

== Notable possessions ==
Oriel has three notable pieces of medieval plate. The first is a French beaker and cover in silver gilt; past estimates on its dating from 1460 to 1470 are thought mistaken, and circa 1350, with later decoration, was later expounded. It was bought in 1493 for £4.18s.1d., under the mistaken belief that it had belonged to Edward II. In a college inventory of plate dated 21 December 1596, it is named as the Founder's Cup.

The second notable piece of plate is a mazer of maplewood with silver gilt mounts, dating from 1470 to 1485. On the edge of the rim is a row of grouped beads; below is an inscription in black letters:

Vir racione vivas non quod petit atra voluptas sic caro casta datur lis lingue suppeditatur
Man, in thy draughts let reason be thy guide, and not the craving of perverted lust;
So honest nourishment will be supplied, and strife of tongue be trampled in the dust

This type of shallow drinking vessel was quite common in the Middle Ages, but the only other mazers in Oxford are three dating from the 15th century, and one standing mazer from 1529 to 1530, all belonging to All Souls. Third is a coconut cup, one of six in Oxford; the Oriel cup has silver gilt mounts and dates from the first quarter of the 16th century.

Among the later plate are two flagons, two patens and a chalice which date from 1640 to 1641. The larger pieces of Buttery Plate include the Sanford and Heywood grace cups, dated 1654–1655 and 1669–1670, a rosewater ewer gifted in 1669, a punchbowl dating from 1735 to 1736, and the great Wenman tankard presented in 1679, which holds a gallon and is the largest in Oxford. Many of the 17th- and 18th-century tankards were given by commensales and commoners as a form of an admission fee.

Oriel also possesses an engrossment of the Magna Carta.

== Honorary fellows ==
Honorary fellows are:

- Malcolm Airs
- Sir Al Aynsley-Green
- Jonathan Barnes
- Linda Doyle
- R. J. W. Evans
- Eric Foner
- Robert Fox
- Charles Handy
- Philip Harris, Baron Harris of Peckham
- John Hegarty

== See also ==
- St Mary's College, Oxford
