= Oriel Square tennis court =

Tennis court in Oriel Square, Oxford, England

Coordinates: 51.75202°N 1.25427°W

The Oriel Square tennis court was a real tennis court that was located in Oriel Square, central Oxford, England. The Liber Albus mentions the Oriel court being in Vinehall Lane in 1577.

Charles I played tennis here with his nephew Prince Rupert in December 1642 and the future King Edward VII, accompanied by the Duke of Marlborough, played tennis here in 1859.

The court survived until 1923, when it was used as a lecture hall by Oriel College, though it may have seen earlier use as a theatre. The site is now the location of Oriel College's Harris Building, used for student accommodation, a seminar room and lecture theatre.

The only active court left in the city is the Merton Street tennis court.
