= Great Tom =

Great Tom may refer to bells at:

- Christ Church, Oxford — sited in Tom Tower above the college's main entrance, rung 101 times every night at 9:00pm Oxford time.
- Lincoln Cathedral — the cathedral's largest bell, strikes the hour.
- St Paul's Cathedral — Great Tom strikes the hour and tolls for royal deaths.

== See also ==
- Bourdon bell.
