= Academic quarter =

Academic quarter may refer to:

- Academic quarter (year division), a division of the university academic year into four periods, typically 10 weeks long, in the US and some other countries
- Academic quarter (class timing), a quarter-hour transition period offered to students at some European educational institutions for them to travel between class locations
