= John Oliver (Dean of Christ Church) =

English churchman, canon lawyer and courtier

John Oliver (died 1552) was an English churchman, canon lawyer, courtier and Dean of Christ Church, Oxford.

== Life ==
He graduated in the University of Oxford. His degrees were B.C.L. on 30 June 1516, B.Can.L. and D.Can.L. on 20 May 1522, D.C.L. on 11 Oct. 1522. He received numerous preferments in the church. On 22 August 1522 he received the living of Winforton in the diocese of Hereford, and in 1522 he became an advocate at Doctors' Commons. He was also rector of St. Mary Mounthaw, London, but resigned the living in 1527.

Oliver seems to have been among the men whom Cardinal Wolsey advanced, and in 1527 was his commissary. On 4 September 1527 he received the living of Pembridge in the diocese of Hereford, and on 8 September 1528 that of Whitchurch, Lincolnshire. He had now become prominent as the court as an active official. On 22 February 1529 he was sent to Shaftesbury Abbey to take the fealty of Elizabeth Zouche, the new abbess; and at the end of the same year he became prebendary of Southwell. In 1531 he was employed in the proceedings about Henry VIII's divorce, and in 1532 he was one of those consulted by the king as to the consecration of Thomas Cranmer. In the same year he took part in the trial of James Bainham for heresy. On 4 May 1533 Oliver was made dean of Christ Church, Oxford, in succession to John Hygdon He attended to other affairs, however, and in 1533 formed one of the court which declared Queen Catherine of Aragon contumacious. In 1540 he was consulted by convocation as to the validity of the king's marriage with Anne of Cleves; and other similar public duties were confided to him.

When it was decided to alter the foundation of Christ Church, Oliver had to resign his deanery. This he did on 20 May 1545, receiving in exchange a substantial pension. He returned to Doctors' Commons, became a master in chancery in 1547, at some time master of requests; on Thomas Wriothesley's fall the same year, he was one of the commissioners who transacted the lord-chancellor's business in the court of chancery. He took part in Stephen Gardiner's trial at the close of 1550, was a commissioner for the suppression of the Anabaptists in Kent and Essex in 1551, and the same year accompanied the embassy to France to treat of the king Edward VI's possible marriage. He took part in 1551 in the trials of the bishops George Day and Nicholas Heath, and, as Lord-chancellor Richard Rich, 1st Baron Rich was ill, he helped to clear off the chancery business. He died in Doctors' Commons about May 1552.
