= Peter Holder (organist) =

British organist and musician (born 1990)

- Born: 1990; Bewdley
- Occupations: Organ Scholar of Westminster Abbey Sub-Organist of Westminster Abbey Director of Music of Christ Church Cathedral, Oxford
- Instrument: Organ
- Years active: 2010–present
- Website: www.peterholdermusic.co.uk

Peter Holder is an English organist. He is the Organist of Christ Church, Oxford.

== Education ==
Holder was educated as a chorister at Worcester Cathedral and at the King's School, Worcester. He passed the exams for Associateship of the Royal College of Organists (ARCO) in 2009, winning the Limpus, Frederick Shinn, Durrant, and Lord St Audries Prizes. At the Royal Academy of Music in London, he undertook undergraduate and post-graduate studies, graduating in 2013 with HRH Princess Alice the Duchess of Gloucester's Prize for exemplary studentship and winning the John Booth Prize in 2014, and was appointed Pidem Organ Fellow in 2014 and an Associate of the Royal Academy of Music in 2016.

== Career ==
Holder held organ scholarships at Southwell Minster (2008–09), the Royal Hospital Chelsea (2009), St Albans Cathedral (2010–12) and Westminster Abbey (2012–14). In 2014, he became the Sub-Organist of St. Paul's Cathedral, during which time he staged and performed in two Grand Organ Galas.

In October 2017, Holder became Sub-Organist of Westminster Abbey. Holder was the organist for the state funeral of Queen Elizabeth II on 19 September 2022 at Westminster Abbey, as well as for the service of thanksgiving for Prince Philip, Duke of Edinburgh on 29 March 2022.

In addition to his role as Sub-Organist, Holder is also an international recitalist.

In the opening concert of the BBC Proms 2019 season at the Royal Albert Hall, Holder was the organ soloist in the Glagolitic Mass by Leoš Janáček, conducted by Karina Canellakis. In 2021, as part of the Royal Albert Hall's 150th anniversary celebrations, Holder performed a solo organ recital at the Proms.

In June 2022, Holder joined the board of trustees for The Eric Thompson Charitable Trust for Organists and Organ Music.

Holder is also an organ tutor at the Royal Academy of Music.

He was appointed organist of Christ Church, Oxford in May 2024.

== Recordings ==
Holder's first solo recording, 'Bach ist der Vater, wir sind die Buben' was produced at Neresheim Abbey in Germany.

== Discography ==
- Bach ist der Vater, wir sind die Buben (Fugue State Films)
- Bairstow, Harris & Stanford: Choral works (Hyperion, 2018)
- Dove, Weir & Martin (M): Choral works (Hyperion, 2022)
- Mendelssohn: Choral Music (Naxos, 2012)
