= Aston's Eyot =

Island in the River Thames, England

Coordinates: 51.741686°N 1.24555°W

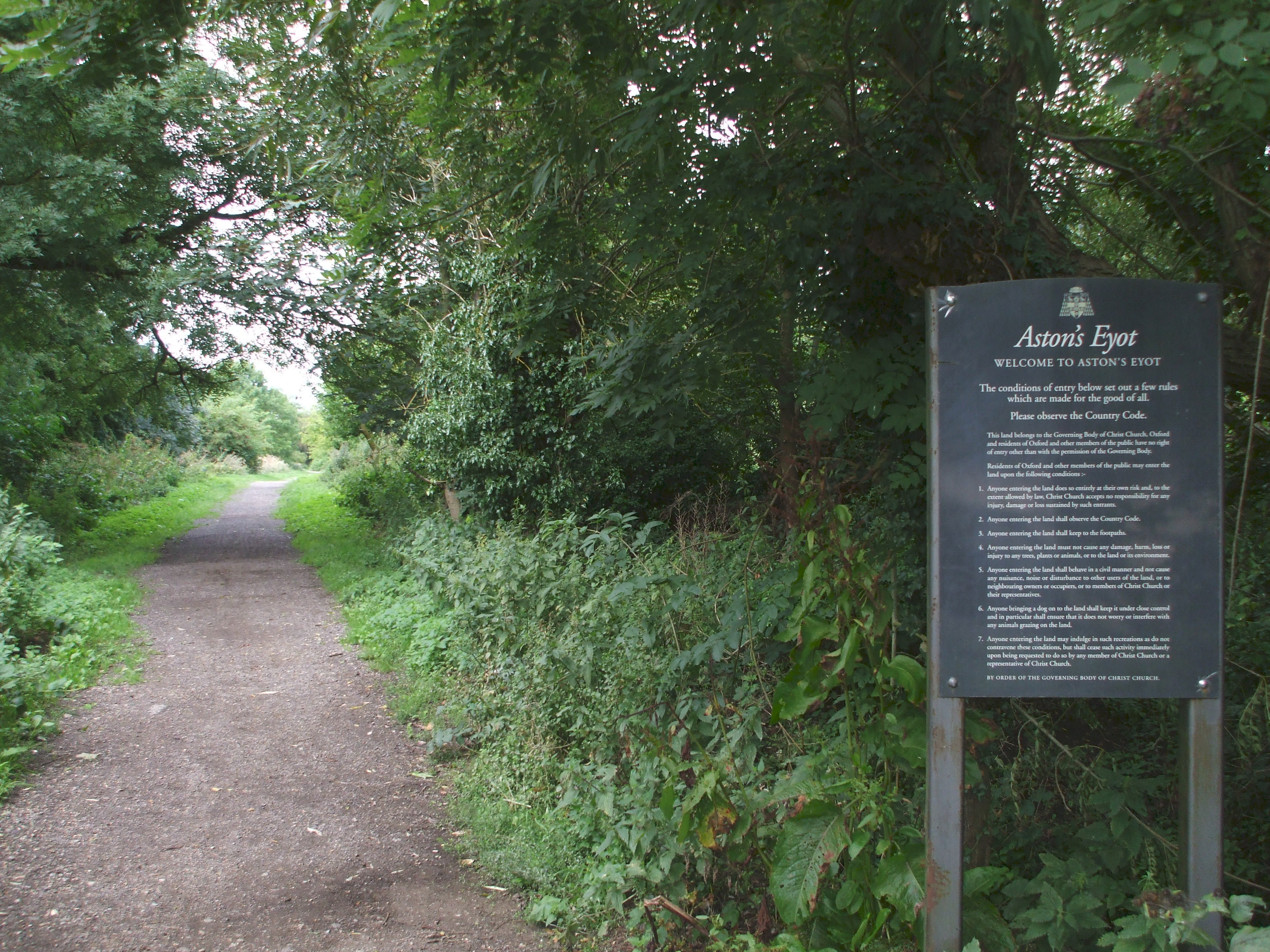
The entrance to Aston's Eyot from Jackdaw Lane.

Aston's Eyot is a 33-acre (13 ha) island on the east bank of the River Thames in the city of Oxford, England, southeast of Christ Church Meadow.

Eyot is another spelling of ait meaning small island. The island is roughly triangular, bounded to the northwest by the River Cherwell and to the southeast by the Shirelake Ditch. There is a mixture of habitats, part woodland, part open/scrub.

The site is leased by Oxford City Council from Christ Church. At the turn of the 19th/20th centuries it was used as a rubbish tip.

It is currently owned by the Friends of Aston's Eyot who operate it as a nature reserve
