= Academic quarter (class timing) =

Quarter-hour at the start of a lecture

An academic quarter (Note: Localized into various languages in the countries where it is practised, as in: Finnish: akateeminen vartti; German: Akademisches Viertel; Icelandic: akademískt korter; Italian: Quarto d'ora accademico; Norwegian: akademisk kvarter; Swedish: akademisk kvart (ak or aq)) is the quarter-hour (15 minute) discrepancy between the nominal start time for a lecture or lesson ("per schema") and the actual starting time, at some universities in most European countries. (Note: Including Austria, Belgium, Croatia, Czech Republic, Denmark, Estonia, Finland, Germany, Greece, Hungary, Italy, Latvia, the Netherlands, Norway, Poland, Portugal, Romania, Serbia, Slovakia, Slovenia, Sweden, Switzerland and the United Kingdom.)

The quarter system started in Sweden and dates back to the days when the ringing of the church bell was the general method of time keeping. When the bell rang on the hour, students had 15 minutes to get to the lecture. Thus a lecture with a defined start time of 10:00 would start at 10:15.

Academic quarter exists to a varying extent in many universities, especially where the campus is spread out over a larger area, necessitating the fifteen-minute delay for the students to walk from one building to another between classes.

In the German university system, lectures scheduled at a certain hour, with or without the addition "c.t." (cum tempore, Latin for "with time"), usually start 15 minutes after the full hour. If this is not the case, usually "s.t." (sine tempore, Latin for "without time") is added to indicate that the lecture will begin at the exact time.

In Polish the phrase kwadrans akademicki refers to an unspoken rule allowing students and lecturers to arrive up to 15 minutes late to a lecture; the students can skip the lecture without repercussions should the lecturer not arrive within that time. Similarly, the Greek phrase ακαδημαϊκό τέταρτο also refers to an unspoken rule that allows both lecturers and students to join the class with a delay of up to 15 minutes; no law is currently in place to formalize this practice which extends to the school system as well as many workplaces. In some institutions it is traditional for the lecturer to always arrive in class 15 minutes late to accommodate the students' potential delay.

== Examples ==
At Uppsala University, the academic quarter was officially abolished in 1982 by Rector Martin H:son Holmdahl, and since then lectures are officially scheduled one quarter after the full hour, e.g. the scheduled starting time of morning lectures is 8:15. In the student social life at Uppsala University and Lund University, a double-quarter (Swedish: dubbelkvart (dk) or dq) also exists. At Uppsala, it refers to the thirty minutes between the full hour and the official time when a banquet or other semi-official party or sit-down dinner starts. During this half-hour, guests mingle and make sure they know where their seats are.

At Lund University, times are commonly stated meaning single-quartered during daytime and doubly-quartered in the evening after 6 pm and on weekends. Double-quarter means that the event starts thirty minutes after the posted time. In the evening this extra quarter is to allow you to freshen up. Academic quarter only applies to time given in full hours, and the academic quarter can be removed by saying that the time is "on the dot" by adding the word "dot" ("prick" in Swedish) or an actual ".". E.g. 10 dot is 10:00. The dot removes one academic quarter, so in the evening time "on the dot" is written "dot dot" to remove both quarters. Time given with minutes, such as 10:00 is always "on the dot".

At KTH Royal Institute of Technology the academic quarter is applied to lectures but not to labs.

At University of California, Berkeley, classes generally start 10 minutes after the posted starting time. This is informally known as "Berkeley time".

At the ETH Zurich, classes generally start 15 minutes before or after the posted starting time or on the exact time, depending on the campus on which the classes take place.

A similar tradition called Oxford time, with a different historical background, applies at the University of Oxford.

At the Massachusetts Institute of Technology, classes begin five minutes after and end five minutes before the posted times.
