= John Hygdon =

English academic and churchman

John Hygdon (or Hygden) (1472–1533) was an English academic and churchman.

== Career ==
President of Magdalen College, Oxford, from 1516 to 1525, Hygdon became the first dean of Cardinal College, Oxford (1525–31) and from 1532 to 1533 of its successor, King Henry VIII's College (later refounded as Christ Church). From 1502 to 1504, he had served as vicar of Upper Beeding, Sussex. Brian Hygdon, the Dean of York, was his brother.
