= Oxford time =

Custom of having scheduled events occur five minutes late

Coordinates: 51°45′7″N 1°15′28″W

Oxford time is the custom of having scheduled events occur five minutes past the specified time. It is a peculiar tradition of timekeeping in Oxford, especially in connection with the University of Oxford.

== Astronomical background ==
As a result of the rotation of the Earth, the mean solar time of places that differ from each other in longitude deviates from one another; this deviation amounts to four minutes of time per degree difference in geographical longitude, or one hour per fifteen degrees. For a long time, it was common practice in different cities to actually use this local mean solar time as a basis for timekeeping, so that time differences between different cities could also form within one country. It was not until the 19th century that time zones were introduced, whereby a common legal time was defined for a larger area, such as a state. In the United Kingdom the mean solar time at the Greenwich meridian was defined as the national standard, against which the mean solar time at Oxford is delayed by five minutes.

== Oxford time today ==
Out of tradition, local Oxford mean time is still used as a basis for some events in the city, as opposed to the more common Greenwich Mean Time (GMT) defined by the Greenwich meridian. The consequence of this is that, when measured by a clock set to GMT, events begin five minutes after the specified time. This applies, for example, to lectures, the closing of college doors and services in Christ Church Cathedral. Despite superficial similarities, the Oxford period, therefore, has a historical background that differs from that of the academic quarter used in some continental European universities.

Unlike GMT, Oxford time observes British summer time, as civil time in the UK does. This means, for example, that during the period when summer time is in effect, a university lecture scheduled for 9:00 Oxford time would commence at 9:05 British Summer Time (BST), corresponding to 8:05 GMT.

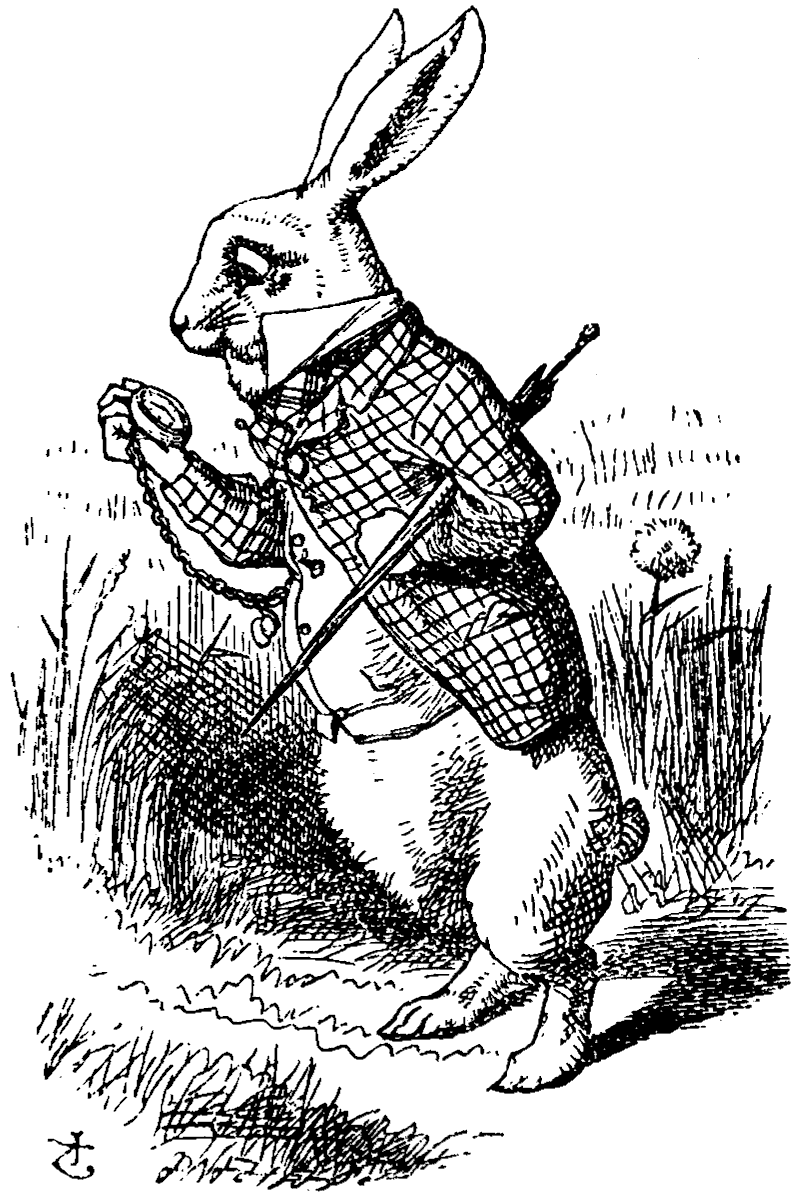
Lewis Carroll's White Rabbit checking his watch

== In literature ==
Lewis Carroll, who himself taught at Oxford, took Oxford time as the inspiration for the perennially unpunctual White Rabbit in Alice's Adventures in Wonderland.

== See also ==
- Academic quarter (class timing)
