= Merton College, Oxford =

College of the University of Oxford

Merton College
- University of Oxford
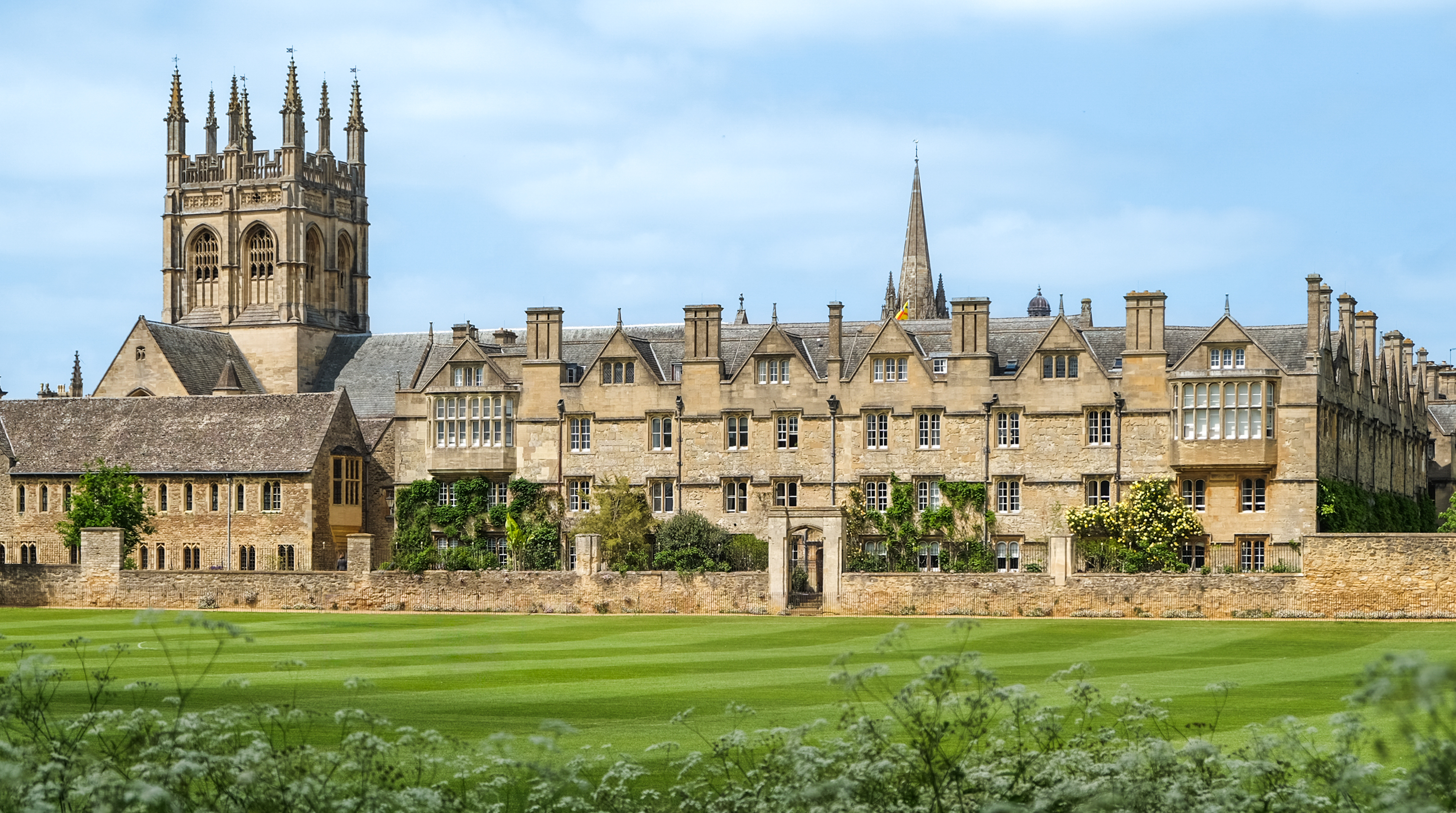
- South facade as seen from Merton Field

- Arms: Or, three chevronels party per pale, the first and third azure and gules, the second gules and azure
- Coordinates: 51°45′3″N 1°15′7″W
- Full name: The House or College of Scholars of Merton in the University of Oxford
- Latin name: Collegium de Merton, Domus sive collegium scholarium de Merton in universitate Oxon
- Motto: "Qui Timet Deum Faciet Bona" ("He who fears God shall do good")
- Established: 1264; 762 years ago
- Named for: Walter de Merton
- Sister college: Peterhouse, Cambridge
- Warden: Jennifer Payne
- Undergraduates: 314
- Postgraduates: 188
- Endowment: £419.6 million (2025)
- Website: merton.ox.ac.uk
- Boat club: Boat Club

Map
- Location within Oxford city centre

Merton College (in full: The House or College of Scholars of Merton in the University of Oxford) is a constituent college of the University of Oxford in England. Its foundation can be traced back to the 1260s when Walter de Merton, chancellor to Henry III and later to Edward I, first drew up statutes for an independent academic community and established endowments to support it. An important feature of de Merton's foundation was that this "college" was to be self-governing and the endowments were directly vested in the Warden and Fellows.

By 1274, when Walter retired from royal service and made his final revisions to the college statutes, the community was consolidated at its present site in the south east corner of the city of Oxford, and a rapid programme of building commenced. The hall and the chapel and the rest of the front quad were complete before the end of the 13th century. Mob Quad, one of Merton's quadrangles, was constructed between 1288 and 1378, and is claimed to be the oldest quadrangle in Oxford, while Merton College Library, located in Mob Quad and dating from 1373, is the oldest continuously functioning library for university academics and students in the world.

Like many of Oxford's colleges, Merton admitted its first mixed-sex cohort in 1979, after over seven centuries as an institution for men only. Merton's second female warden, Irene Tracey, was appointed as Vice-Chancellor of the University of Oxford in 2022, and Professor Jennifer Payne was subsequently elected as acting warden in 2022 and as warden in 2023.

Alumni and academics past and present include five Nobel laureates, the writer J. R. R. Tolkien, who was Merton Professor of English Language and Literature from 1945 to 1959, Liz Truss, who served as Prime Minister of the United Kingdom in September and October 2022, and Naruhito, the Emperor of Japan. Merton is one of the wealthiest colleges in Oxford and held funds totalling £420 million as of July 2025. Regularly ranking first in the Norrington Table, Merton is also among the academically most selective and successful colleges.

== History ==
=== Foundation and origins ===
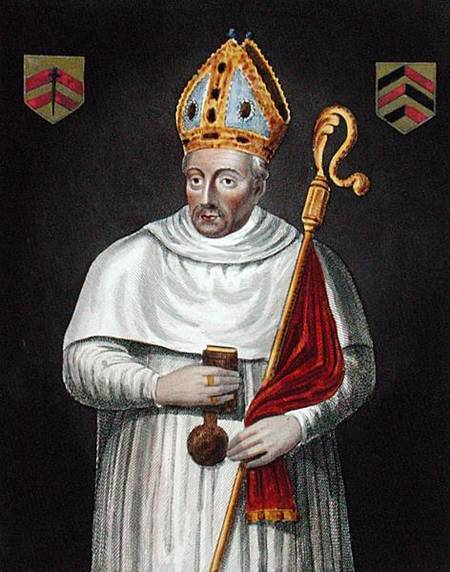
Walter de Merton, (c. 1205 – 27 October 1277), founder of Merton

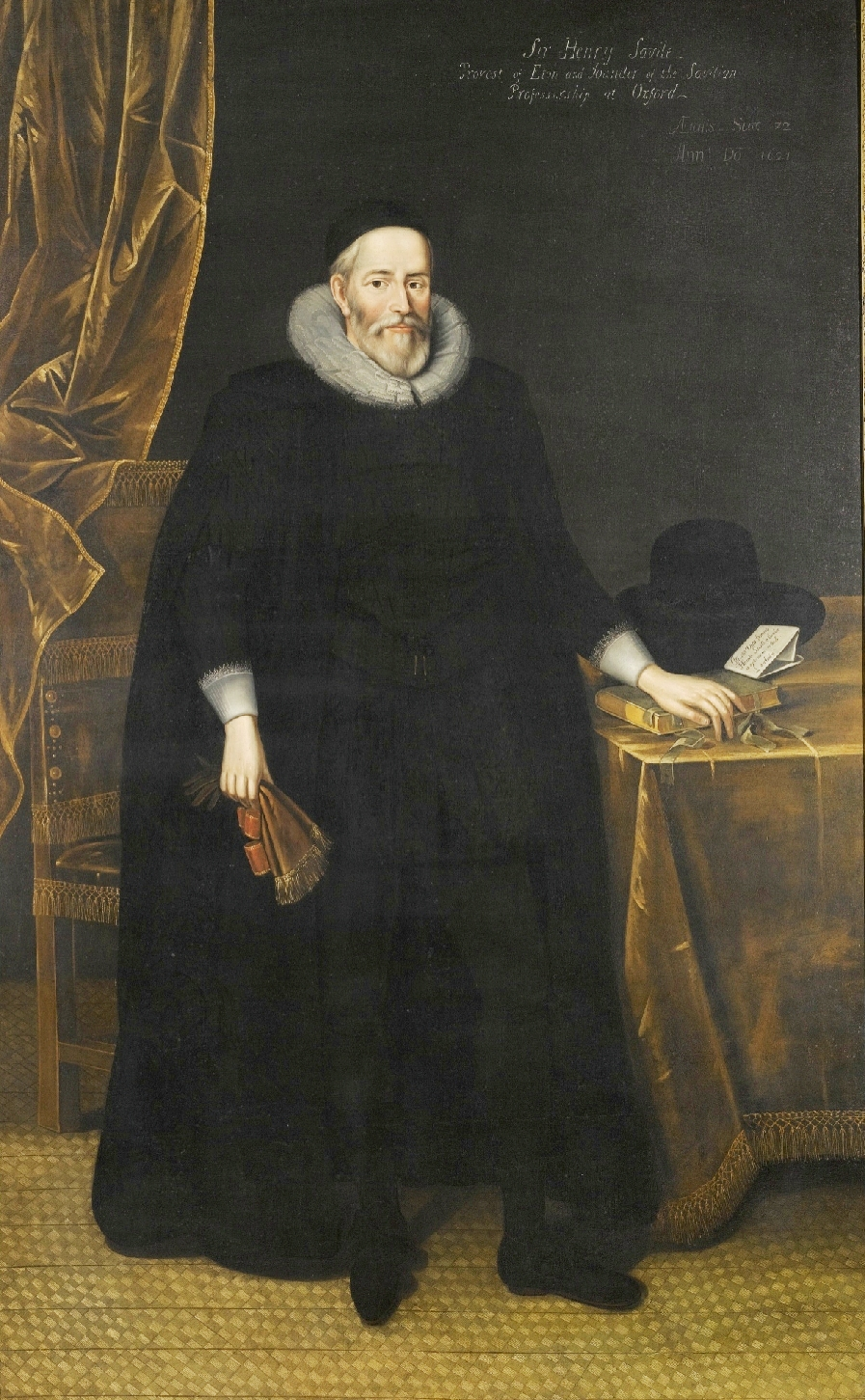
Henry Savile, Warden from 1585 to 1621, had great influence on the development of the college.

Merton College was founded in 1264 by Walter de Merton, Lord Chancellor and Bishop of Rochester. It has a claim to be the oldest college in Oxford, a claim which is disputed between Merton College, Balliol College and University College. One argument for Merton's claim is that it was the first college to be provided with statutes, a constitution governing the college set out at its founding. Merton's statutes date back to 1264, whereas neither Balliol nor University College had statutes until the 1280s.

Merton has an unbroken line of wardens dating back to 1264. Of these, many had great influence over the development of the college.

In 1333, masters from Merton were among those who left Oxford in an attempt to found a new university at Stamford. The leader of the rebels was reported to be one William de Barnby, a Yorkshireman who had been fellow and bursar of Merton College.

On 17 April 1518 Catherine of Aragon, Queen of King Henry VIII, dined at Merton. She had come to visit the Shrine of St Frideswide (a saint associated with assisting women in childbirth) at Christchurch Cathedral. The Warden of Merton, Richard Rawlins, recorded the visit in the College Register in flattering terms, linking the Queen with the deities Juno and Minerva. Regrettably St Frideswide did not assist with the birth of a Tudor heir. A portrait of the Queen, thought to be contemporary, hangs in the college to this day.

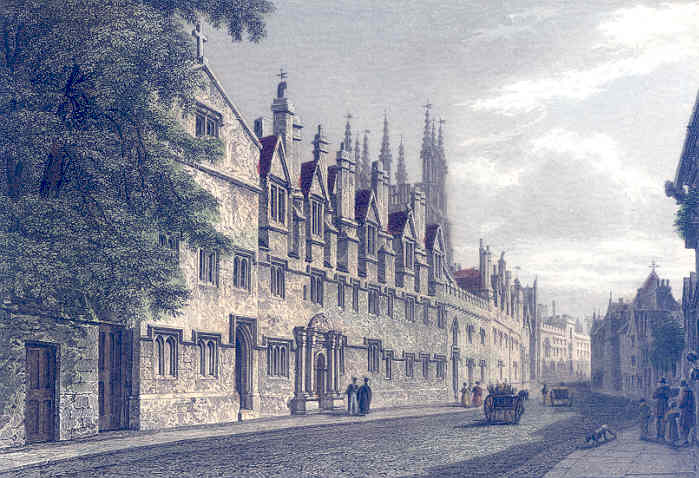
St Alban Hall, pictured in 1837, engraving by John Le Keux from a drawing by F. Mackenzie

St Alban Hall was an independent academic hall owned by the convent of Littlemore until it was purchased by Merton College in 1548 following the dissolution of the convent. It continued as a separate institution until it was finally annexed by the college in 1881, on the resignation of its last principal, William Charles Salter.

Henry Savile was one notable leader who led the college to flourish in the early 17th century by extending its buildings and recruiting new fellows. On 25 September 1592 Queen Elizabeth I dined at the College, and gave a speech which concluded "Farewell dear Oxford, God bless thee and increase thy sons in holiness and virtue".

=== Parliamentarian sympathies in the Civil War ===
During the English Civil War, Merton was the only Oxford college to side with Parliament. This was due to an earlier dispute between the Warden, Nathaniel Brent, and the Visitor of Merton and Archbishop of Canterbury, William Laud. Brent had been Vicar-General to Laud, who had held a visitation of Merton College in 1638, and insisted on many radical reforms: his letters to Brent were couched in haughty and decisive language.

Brent, a parliamentarian, moved to London at the start of the Civil War: the college's buildings were commandeered by the Royalists and used to house much of Charles I's court when Oxford was the Royalists' capital. This included the King's French wife, Queen Henrietta Maria, who was housed in or near what is now the Queen's Room, the room above the arch between Front and Fellows' Quads. A portrait of Charles I hangs near the Queen's Room as a reminder of the role it played in his court.

Brent gave evidence against Laud in his trial in 1644. After Laud was executed on 10 January 1645, John Greaves, one of the subwardens of Merton and Savilian Professor of Astronomy, drew up a petition for Brent's removal from office; Brent was deposed by Charles I on 27 January 1646 and replaced by William Harvey.

Thomas Fairfax captured Oxford for the Parliamentarians after its third siege in 1646 and Brent returned from London. However, in 1647, a parliamentary commission (visitation) was set up by Parliament "for the correction of offences, abuses, and disorders" in the University of Oxford. Nathaniel Brent was the president of the visitors. Greaves was accused of sequestrating the college's plate and funds for King Charles I. Despite a deposition from his brother Thomas, Greaves had lost both his Merton fellowship and his Savilian chair by 9 November 1648.

== Buildings and grounds ==
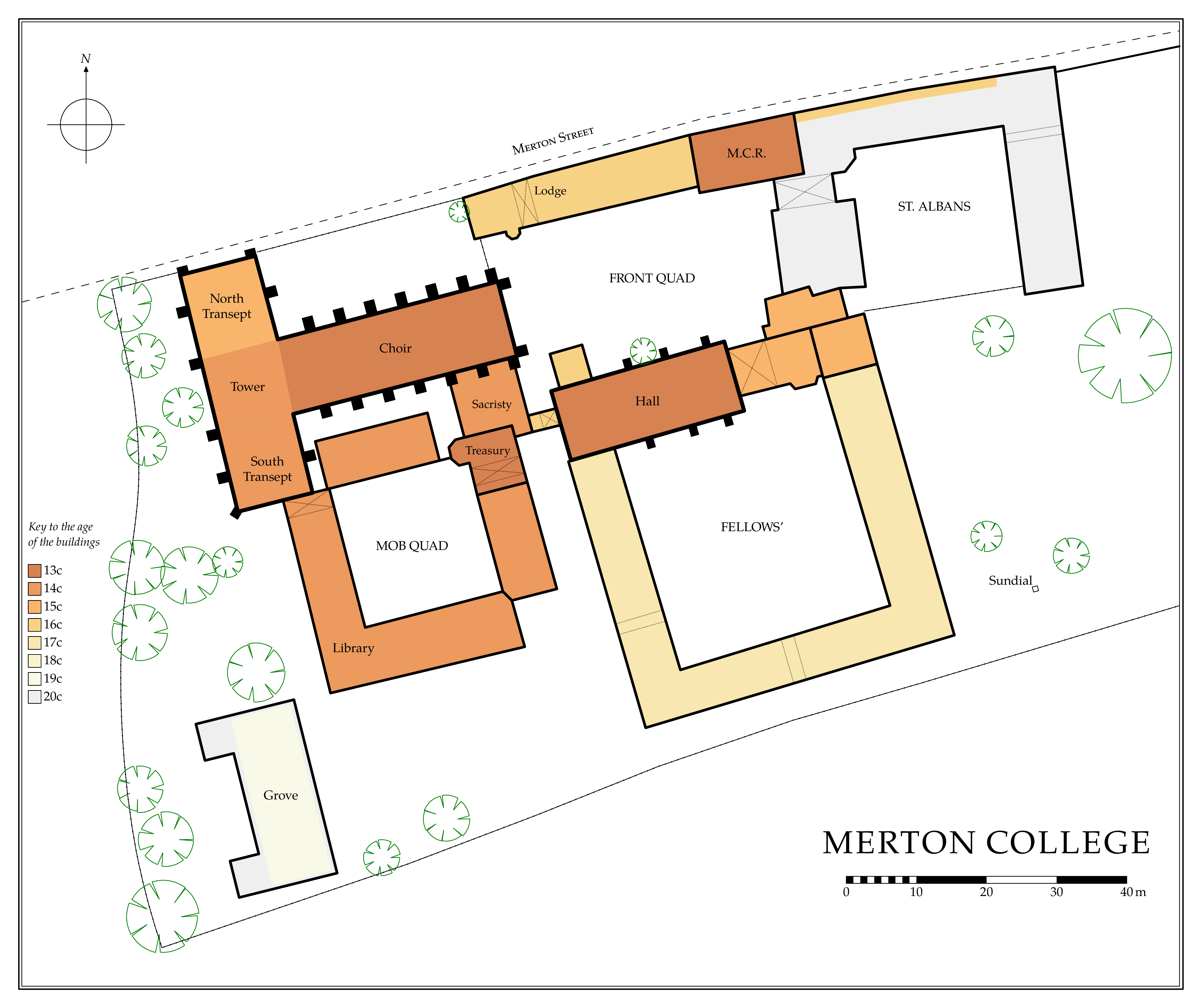
A plan of the buildings, showing the approximate ages of construction

The "House of Scholars of Merton" originally had properties in Surrey (in present-day Old Malden) as well as in Oxford, but it was not until the mid-1260s that Walter de Merton acquired the core of the present site in Oxford, along the south side of what was then St John's Street (now Merton Street). The college was consolidated on this site by 1274, when Walter made his final revisions to the college statutes.

The initial acquisition included the parish church of St John (which was superseded by the chapel) and three houses to the east of the church which now form the north range of Front Quad. Walter also obtained permission from the king to extend from these properties south to the old Oxford city wall to form an approximately square site. The college continued to acquire other properties as they became available on both sides of Merton Street. At one time, the college owned all the land from the site that is now Christ Church to the south-eastern corner of the city. The land to the east eventually became the current Fellows' garden, while the western end was leased by Warden Richard Rawlins in 1515 for the foundation of Corpus Christi (at an annual rent of just over £4).

=== Chapel ===
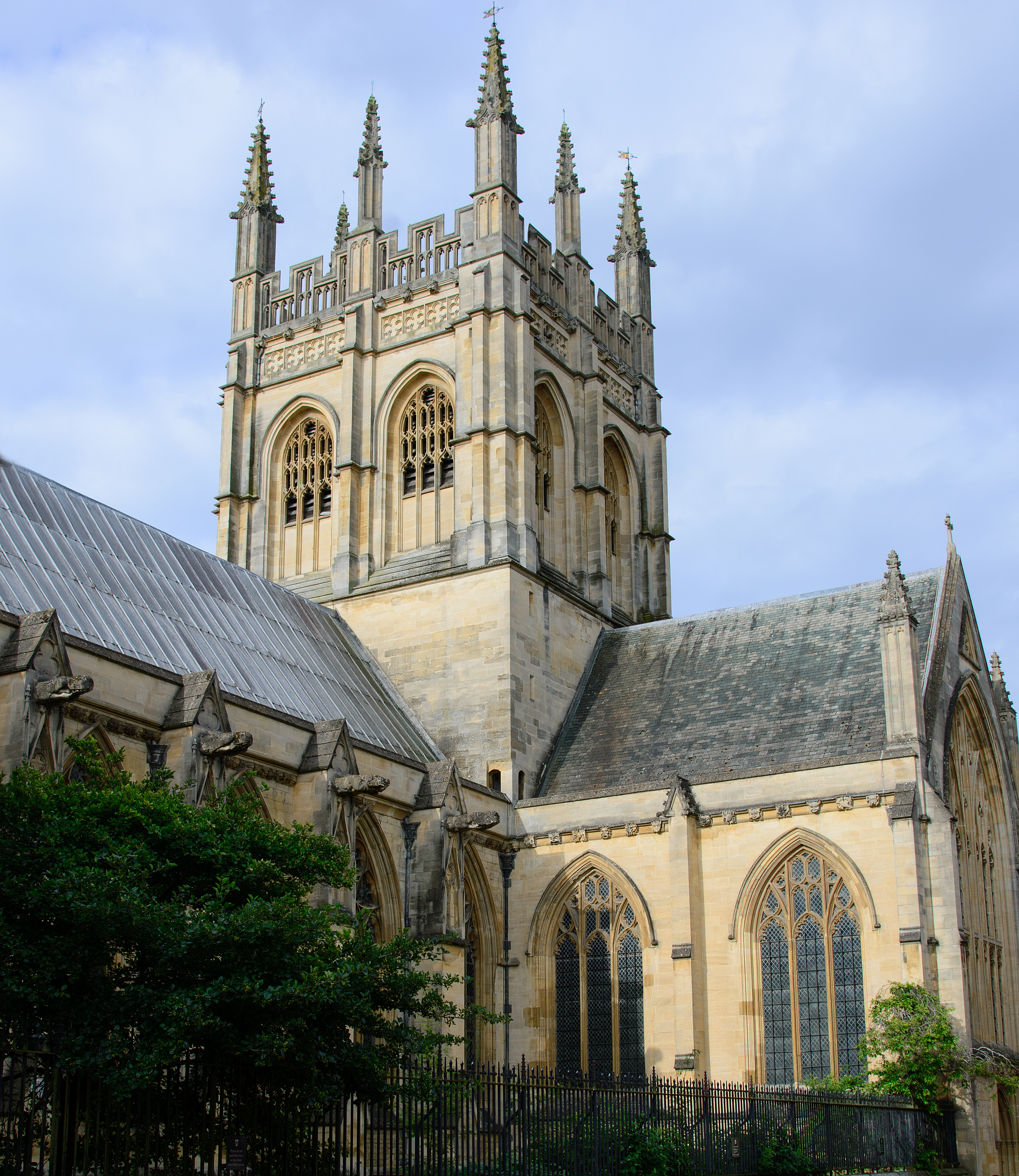
Merton College Chapel exterior

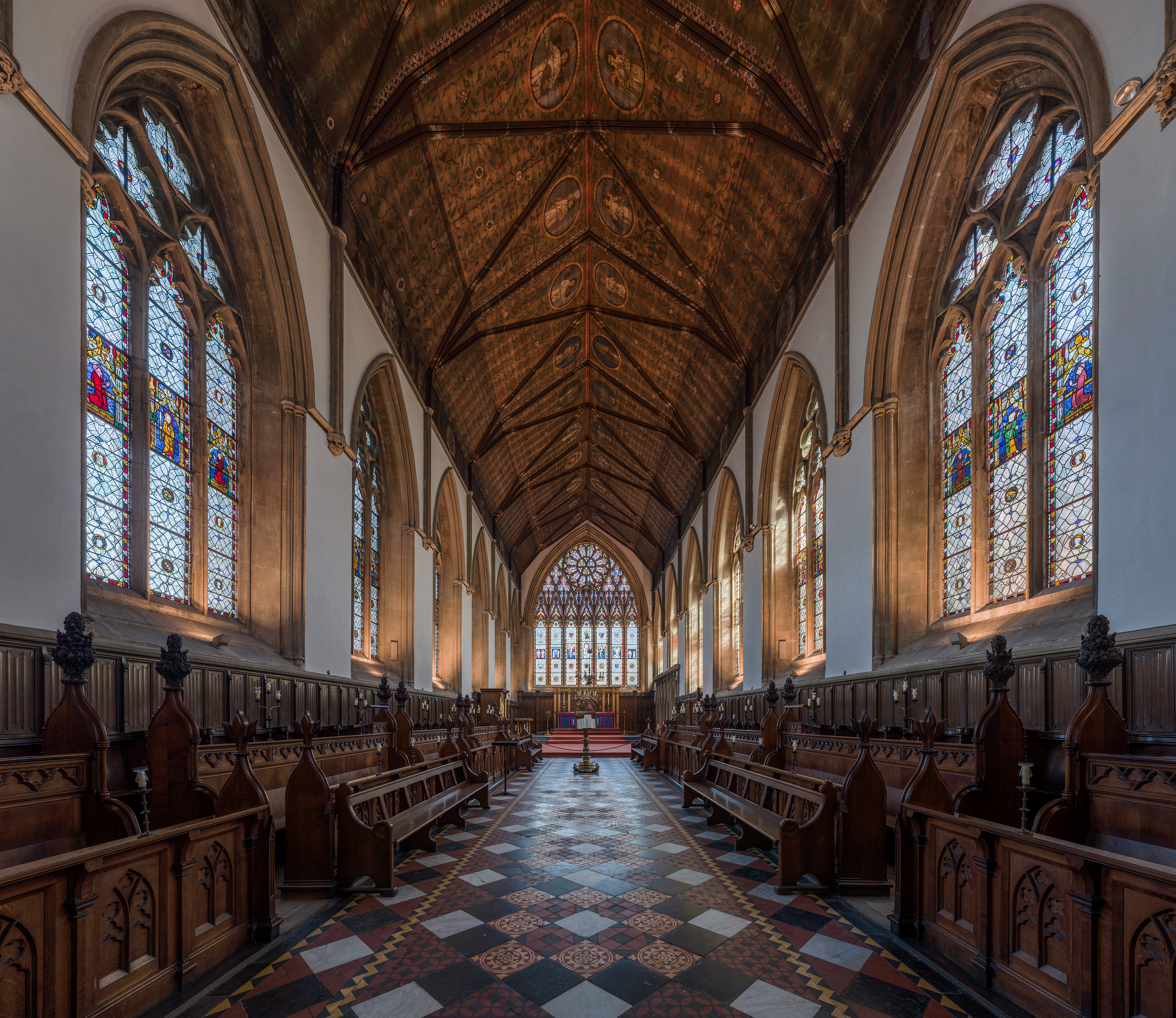
Merton College Chapel interior

By the late 1280s, the old church of St John the Baptist had fallen into "a ruinous condition", and the college accounts show that work on a new church began in about 1290. The present choir, with its enormous east window, was complete by 1294. The window is an important example (because it is so well dated) of how the strict geometrical conventions of the Early English Period of architecture were beginning to be relaxed at the end of the 13th century. The south transept was built in the 14th century, the north transept in the early years of the 15th. The great tower was complete by 1450. The chapel replaced the parish church of St John and continued to serve as the parish church as well as the chapel until 1891. It is for this reason that it is generally referred to as Merton Church in older documents, and that there is a north door into the street as well as doors into the college. This dual role also probably explains the enormous scale of the chapel, which in its original design was to have a nave and two aisles extending to the west.

A new choral foundation was established in 2007, providing for a choir of sixteen undergraduate and graduate choral scholars singing from October 2008. The choir was formerly directed by Peter Phillips, director of the Tallis Scholars, and is now directed by Benjamin Nicholas, a former director of music at Tewkesbury Abbey. In 2013, the installation of a new organ, designed and built by Dobson Pipe Organ Builders, was completed. The chapel is known for its acoustics.

A spire from the chapel has resided in Pavilion Garden VI of the University of Virginia since 1928, when "it was given to the University to honor Jefferson's educational ideals."

=== Front quad and the hall ===
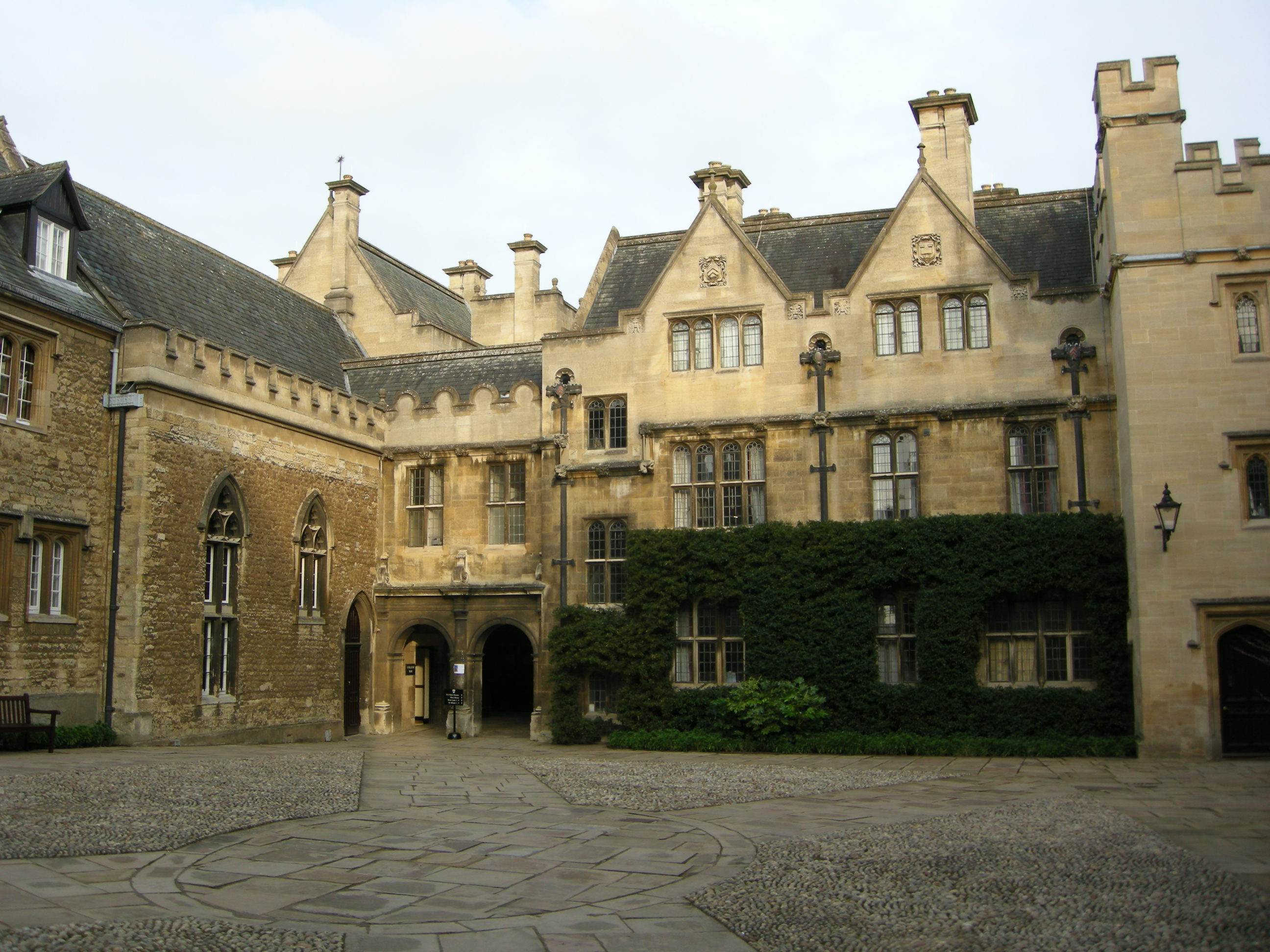
Front quad, view opposite the chapel

The hall is the oldest surviving college building, originally completed before 1277, but apart from the fine medieval ironwork on the door, almost no trace of the ancient structure has survived the successive reconstruction efforts; first by James Wyatt in the 1790s and then again by Gilbert Scott in 1874, whose work included the "handsome oak roof". The hall is still used daily for meals in term time. It is not usually open to visitors.

Front quad itself is probably the earliest collegiate quadrangle, but its informal, almost haphazard, pattern cannot be said to have influenced designers elsewhere. A reminder of its original domestic nature can be seen in the north east corner where one of the flagstones is marked "Well". The quad is formed of what would have been the back gardens of the three original houses that Walter acquired in the 1260s.

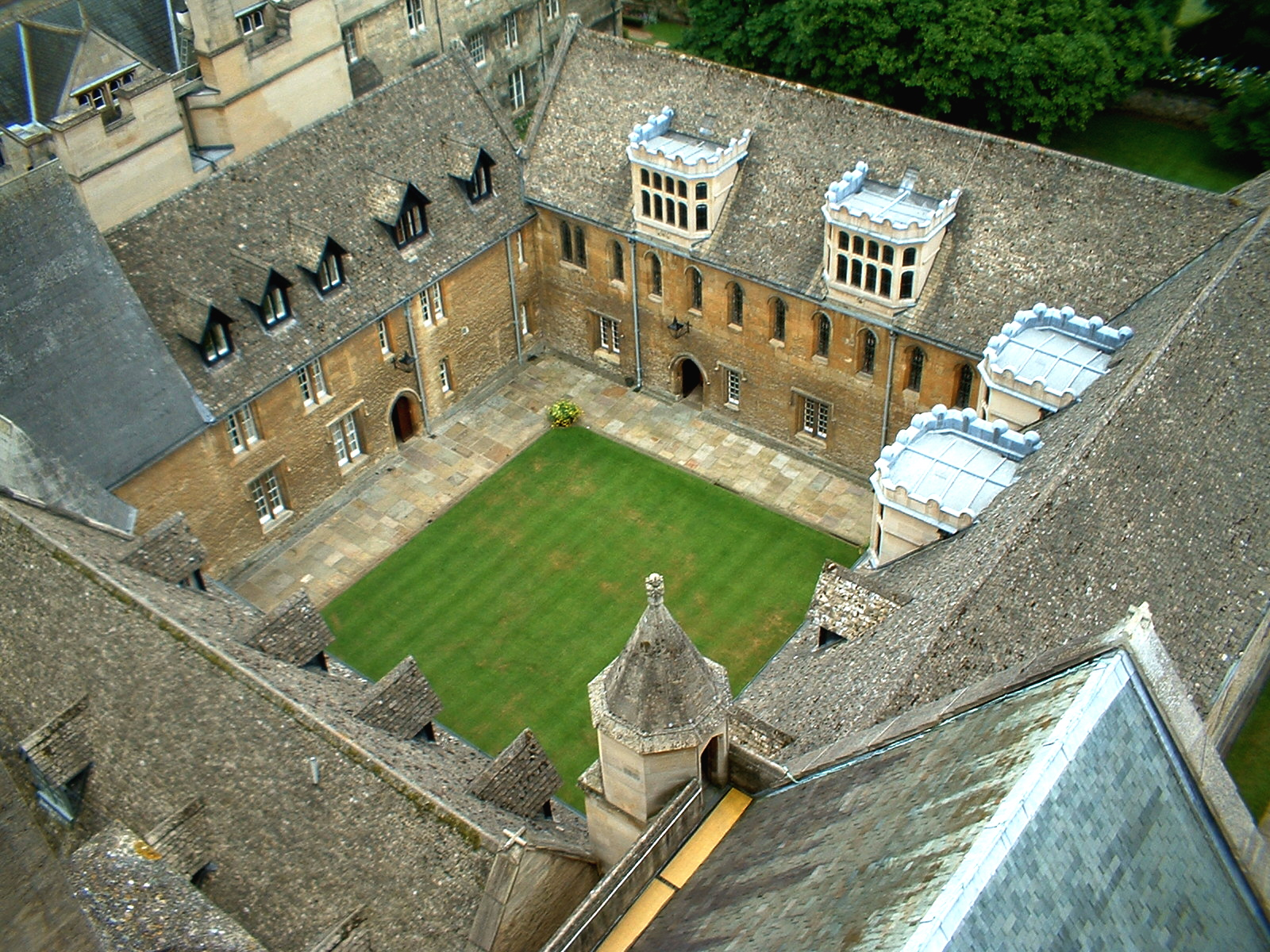
Mob Quad in 2003, from Merton College Chapel tower

=== Mob Quad and library ===
Visitors to Merton are often told that Mob Quad is the oldest quadrangle of any Oxford or Cambridge college and set the pattern for future collegiate architecture. It was built in three phases: 1288–1291, 1304–1311, and finally completed with the Library in 1373–1378. But Merton's own Front Quad was probably enclosed earlier, albeit with a less unified design. Other colleges can point to similarly old and unaltered quadrangles, for example Old Court at Corpus Christi College, Cambridge, built c.1353–1377.

=== Fellows' Quad ===
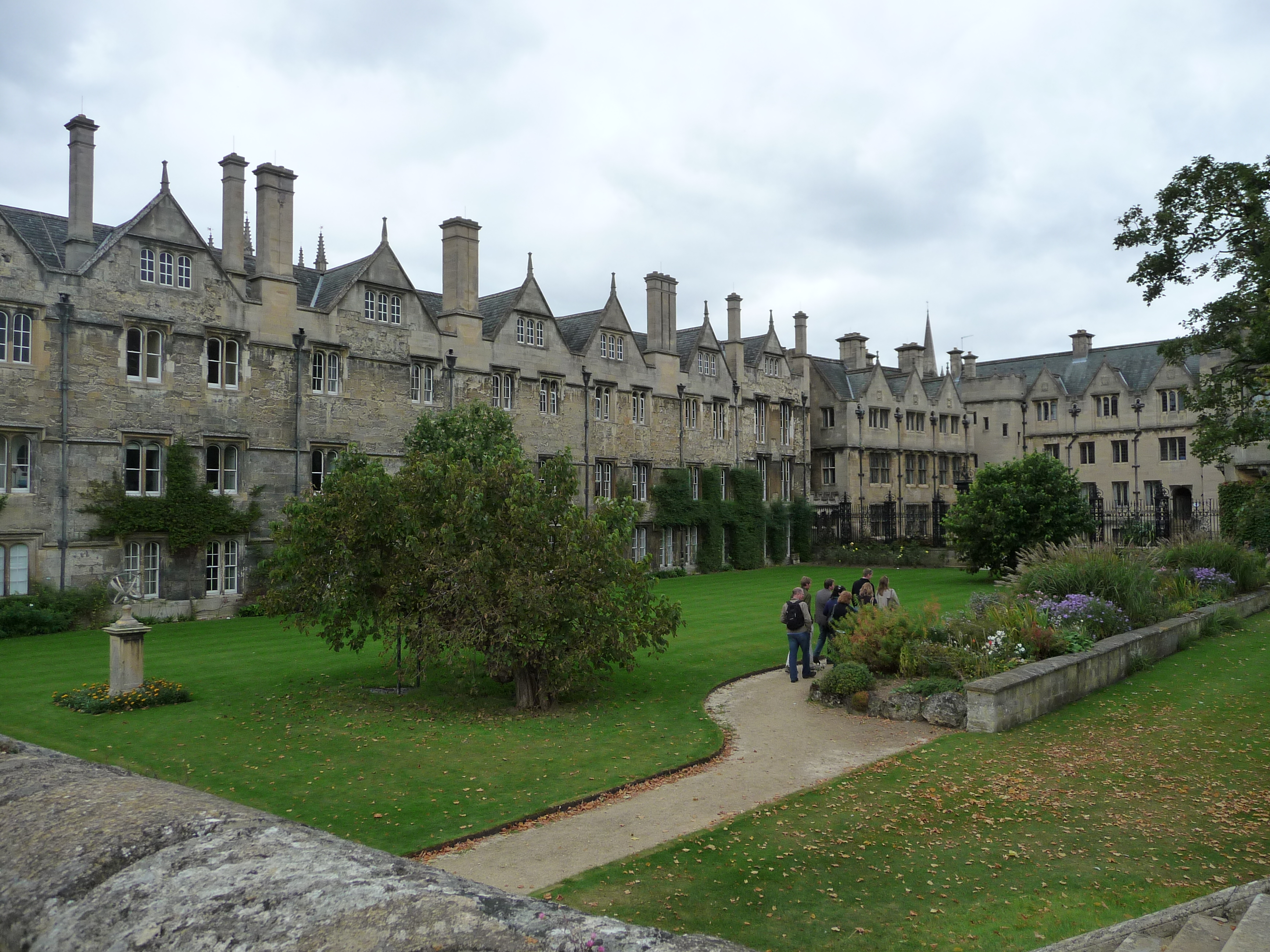
The Sundial Lawn

The grandest quadrangle in Merton is the Fellows' Quadrangle, immediately south of the hall. The quad was the culmination of the work undertaken by Henry Savile at the beginning of the 17th century. The foundation stone was laid shortly after breakfast on 13 September 1608 (as recorded in the college Register), and work was complete by September 1610 (although the battlements were added later). The southern gateway is surmounted by a tower of the four Orders, probably inspired by Italian examples that Warden Savile would have seen on his European travels. The main contractors were from Yorkshire (as was Savile); John Ackroyd and John Bentley of Halifax supervised the stonework, and Thomas Holt the timber. This group were also later employed to work on the Bodleian Library and Wadham College.

=== Other buildings ===
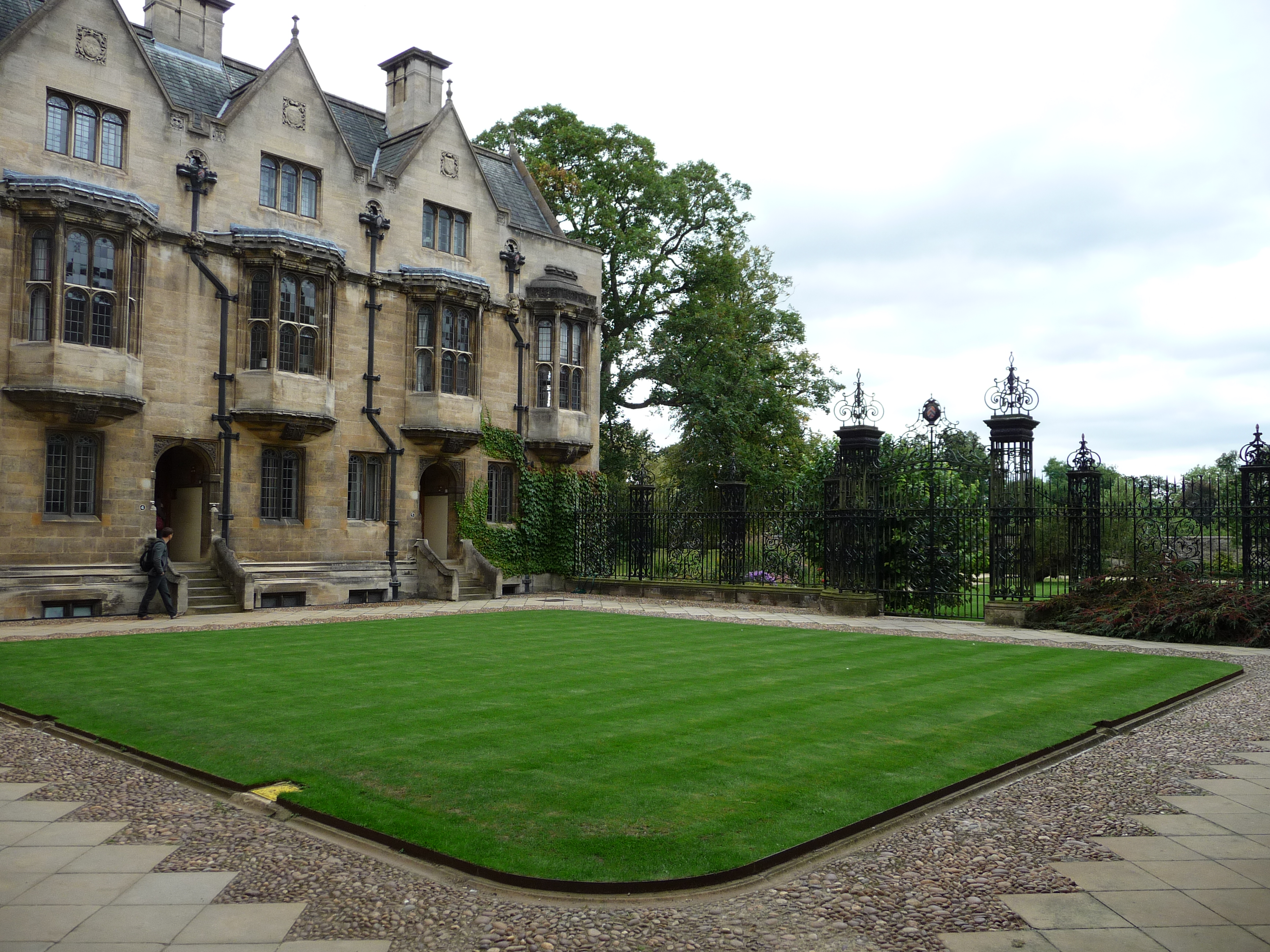
St Alban's Quad

Most of the other buildings are Victorian or later and include: St Alban's Quad (or "Stubbins"), designed by Basil Champneys, built on the site of the medieval St Alban Hall (elements of the older façade are incorporated into the part that faces onto Merton Street); the Grove building, built in 1864 by William Butterfield but "chastened" in the 1930s by T. H. Hughes; the buildings beyond the Fellows' Garden called "Rose Lane"; several buildings north of Merton Street, including a real tennis court, and the Old Warden's Lodgings (designed by Champneys in 1903); and a new quadrangle in Holywell Street, some distance away from the college.

=== T. S. Eliot Lecture Theatre ===
T. S. Eliot Lecture Theatre is a new lecture theatre named after T. S. Eliot, a former member of the college, opened in 2010. It has a bust of the writer by Jacob Epstein, presented by Frank Brenchley, a former member and Fellow of the college. Brenchley presented his collection of Eliot first editions and ephemera to the college, which is believed to be the second largest collection of such material worldwide. The foyer is illuminated by a lighting display representing three constellations that were visible on the night of 14 September 1264, the day the college was founded.

=== Gardens ===
The garden fills the southeastern corner of the old walled city of Oxford. The walls may be seen from Christ Church Meadows and Merton Field (now used by Magdalen College School, Oxford, as a playing field for cricket, rugby, and football). The gardens are notable for a mulberry tree planted in the early 17th century, an armillary sundial, an extensive lawn, a Herma statue, and the old Fellows' Summer House (now used as a music room and rehearsal space).

=== Gallery ===
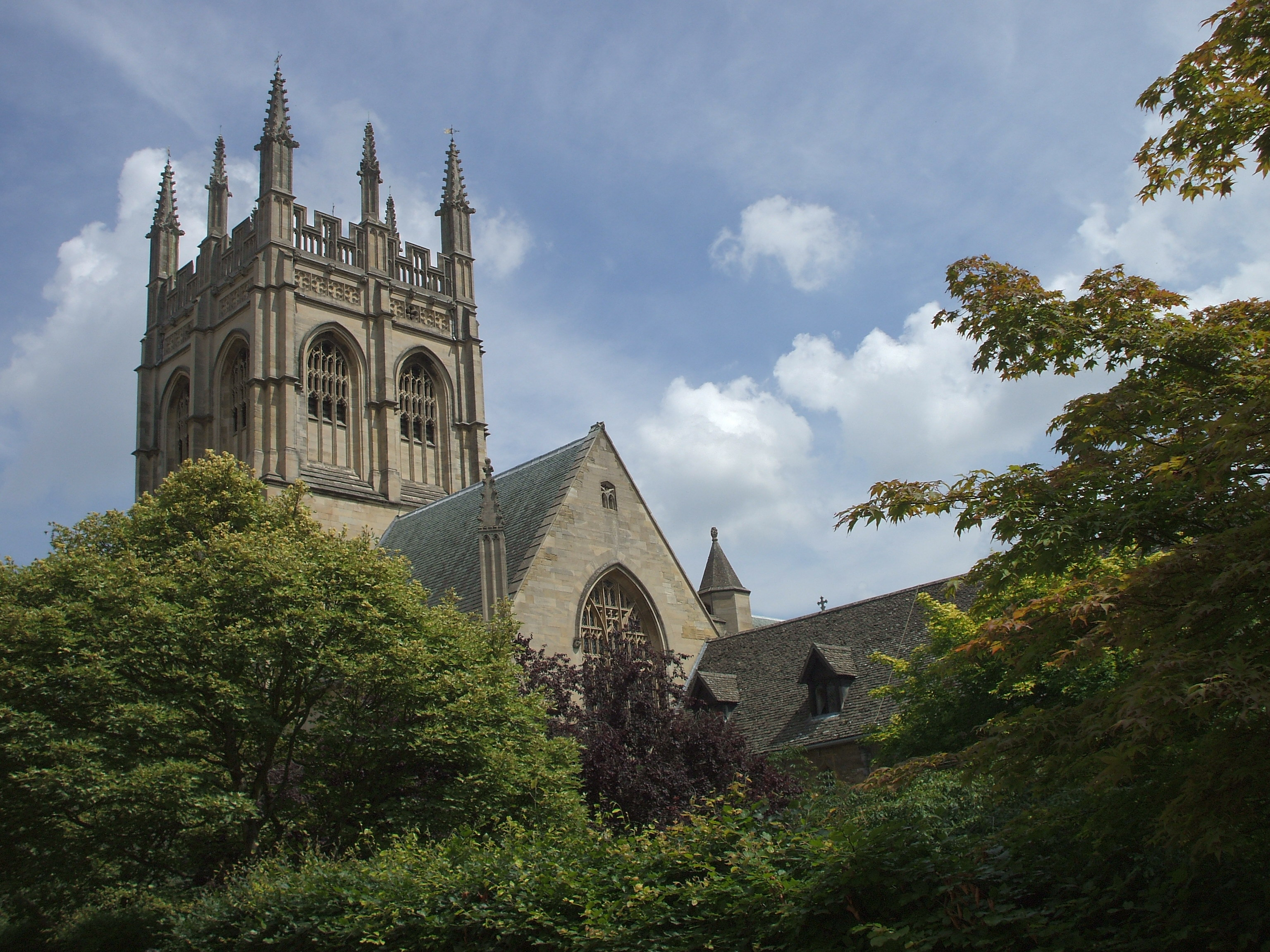
Merton College Chapel from just north of the Christ Church Meadow

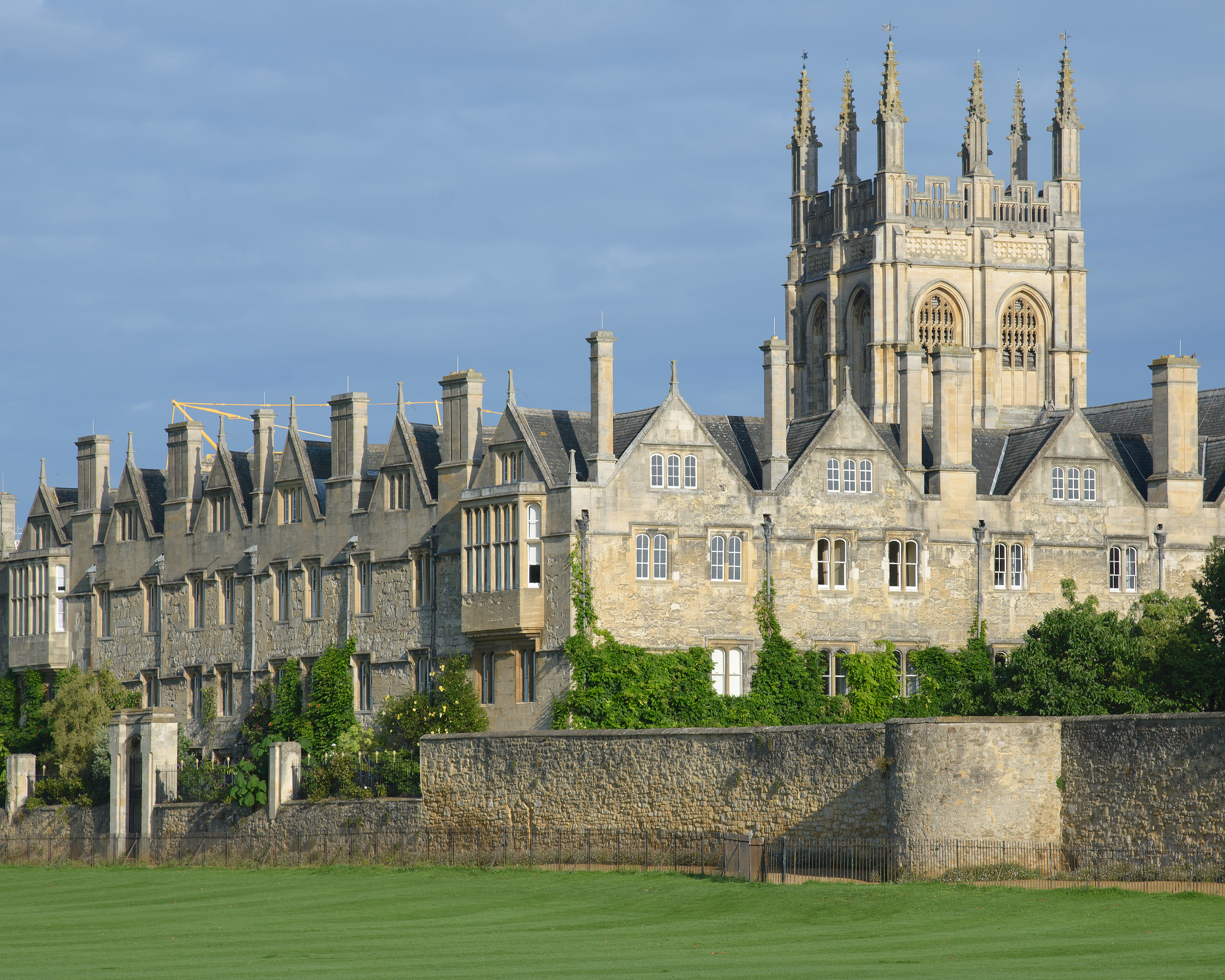
Tower and Fellows' Quad

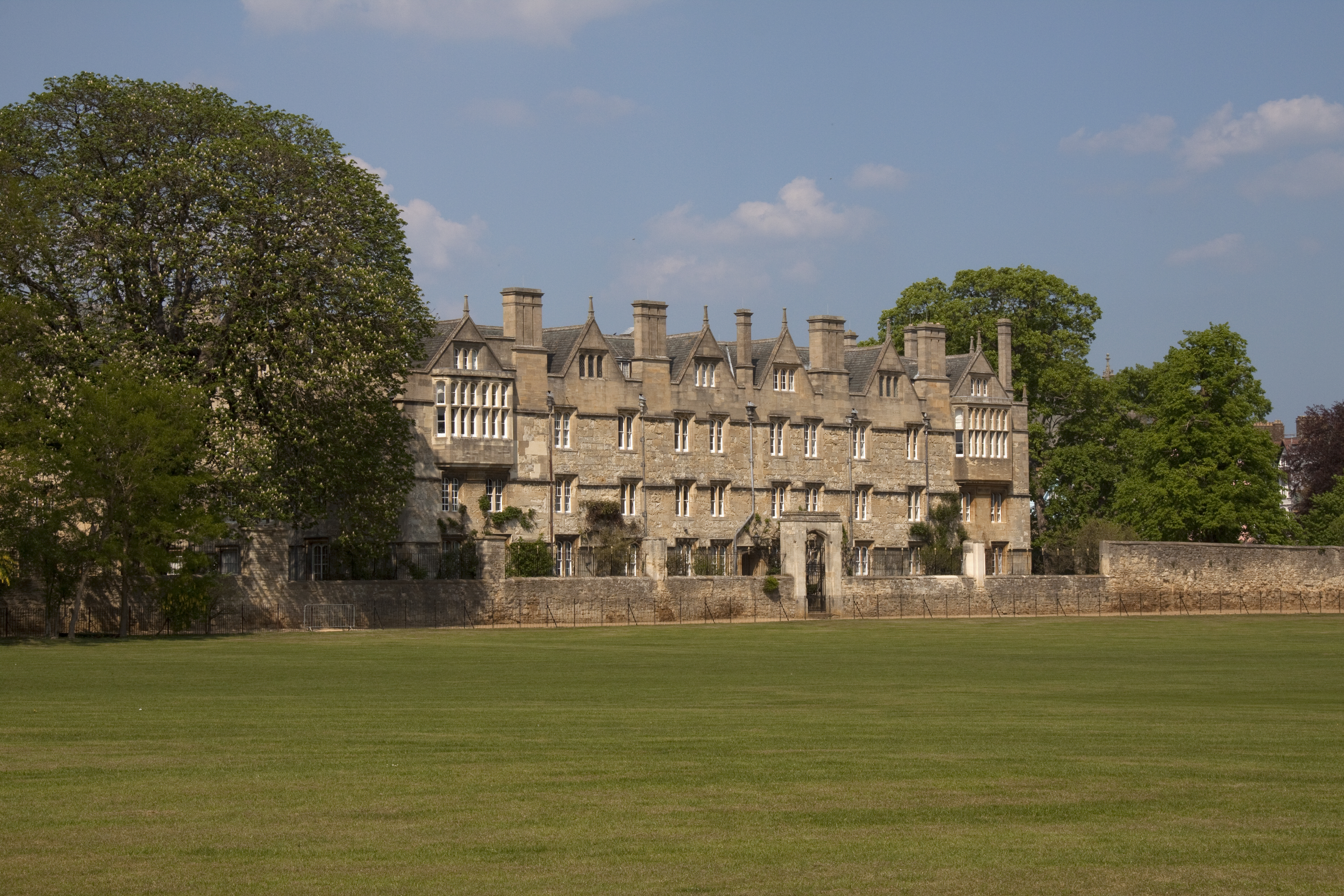
Merton as seen from Broad Walk

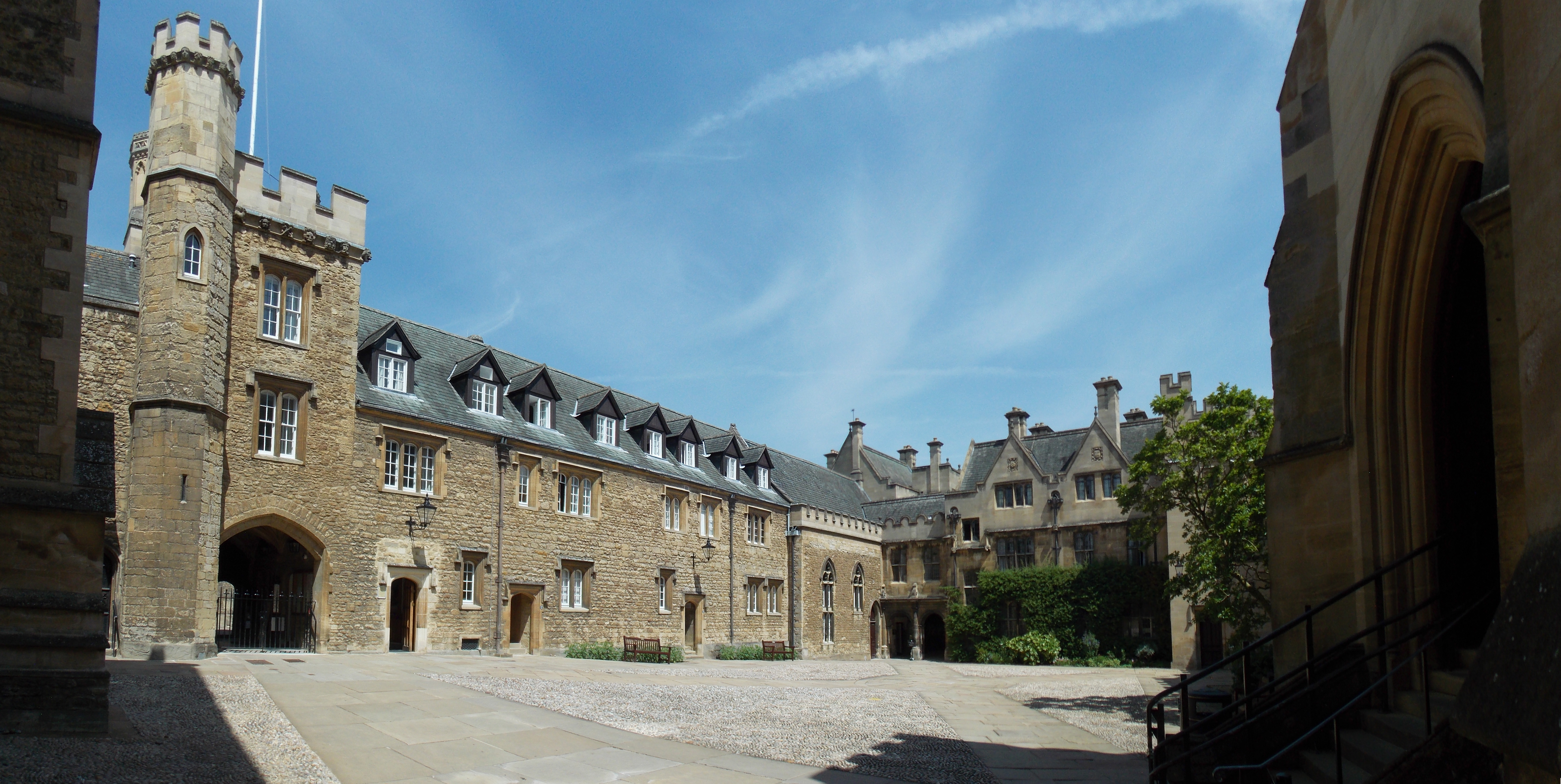
The front quad and the main entrance to the college

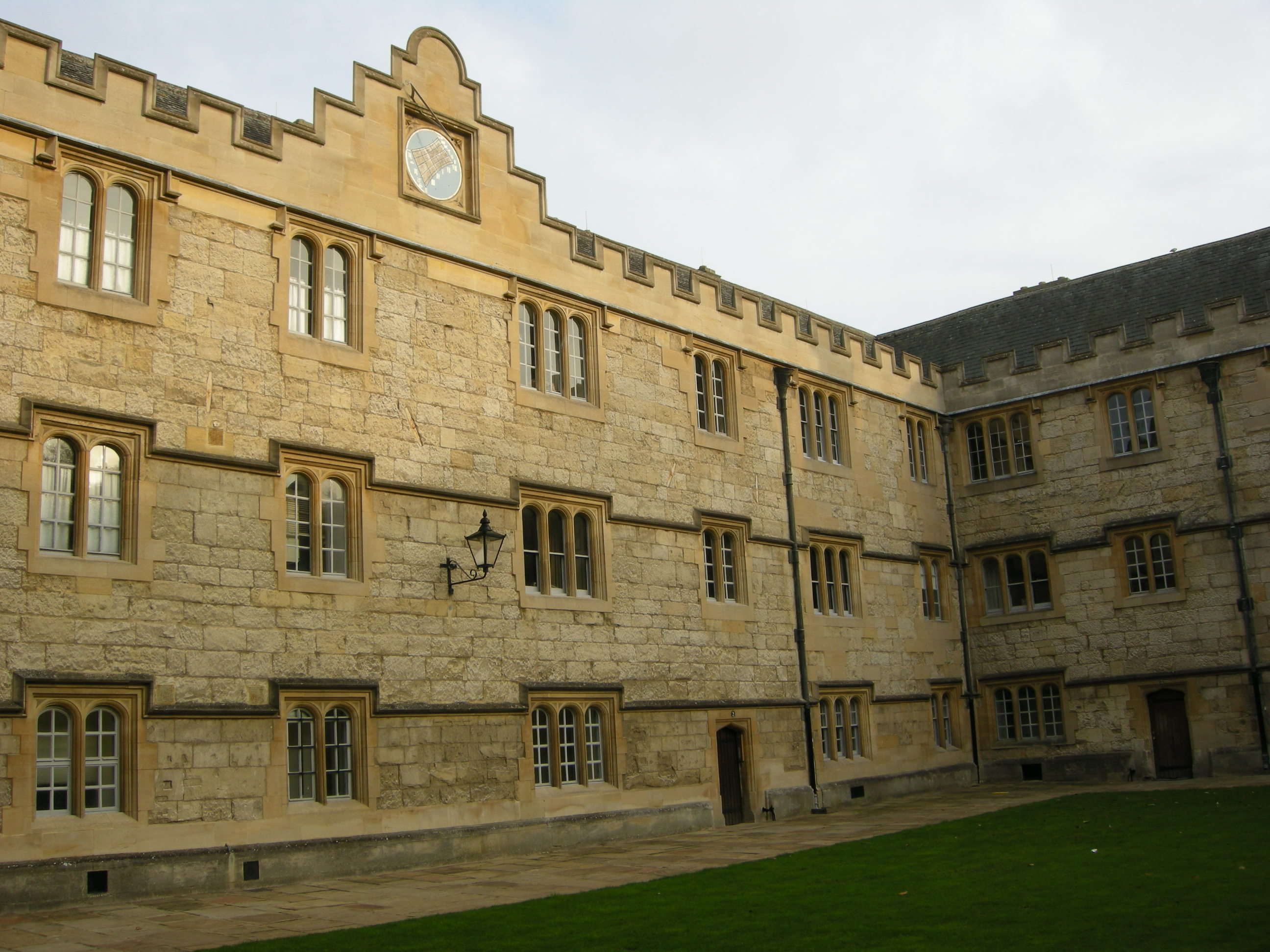
Fellows' quad

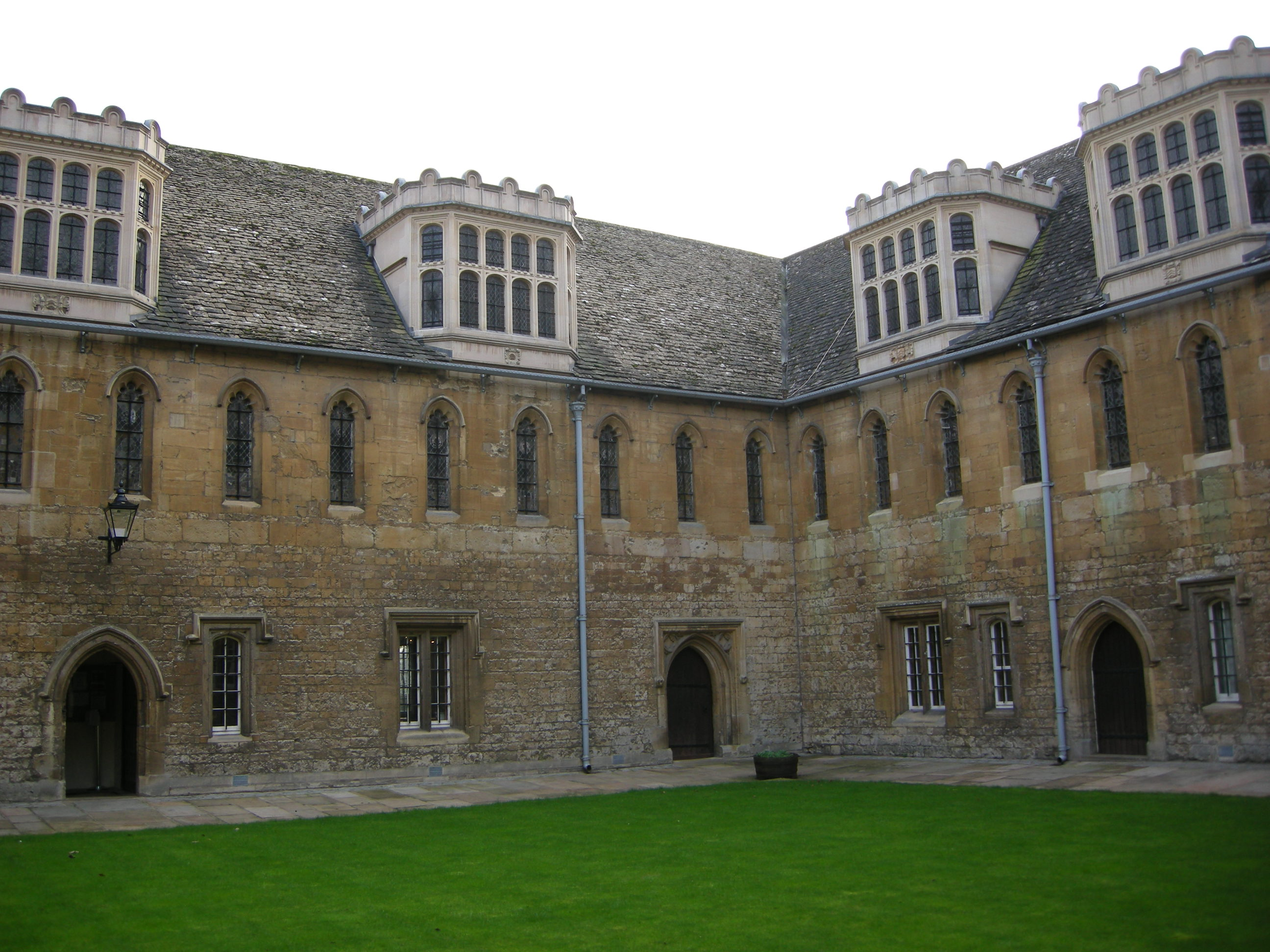
Mob quad

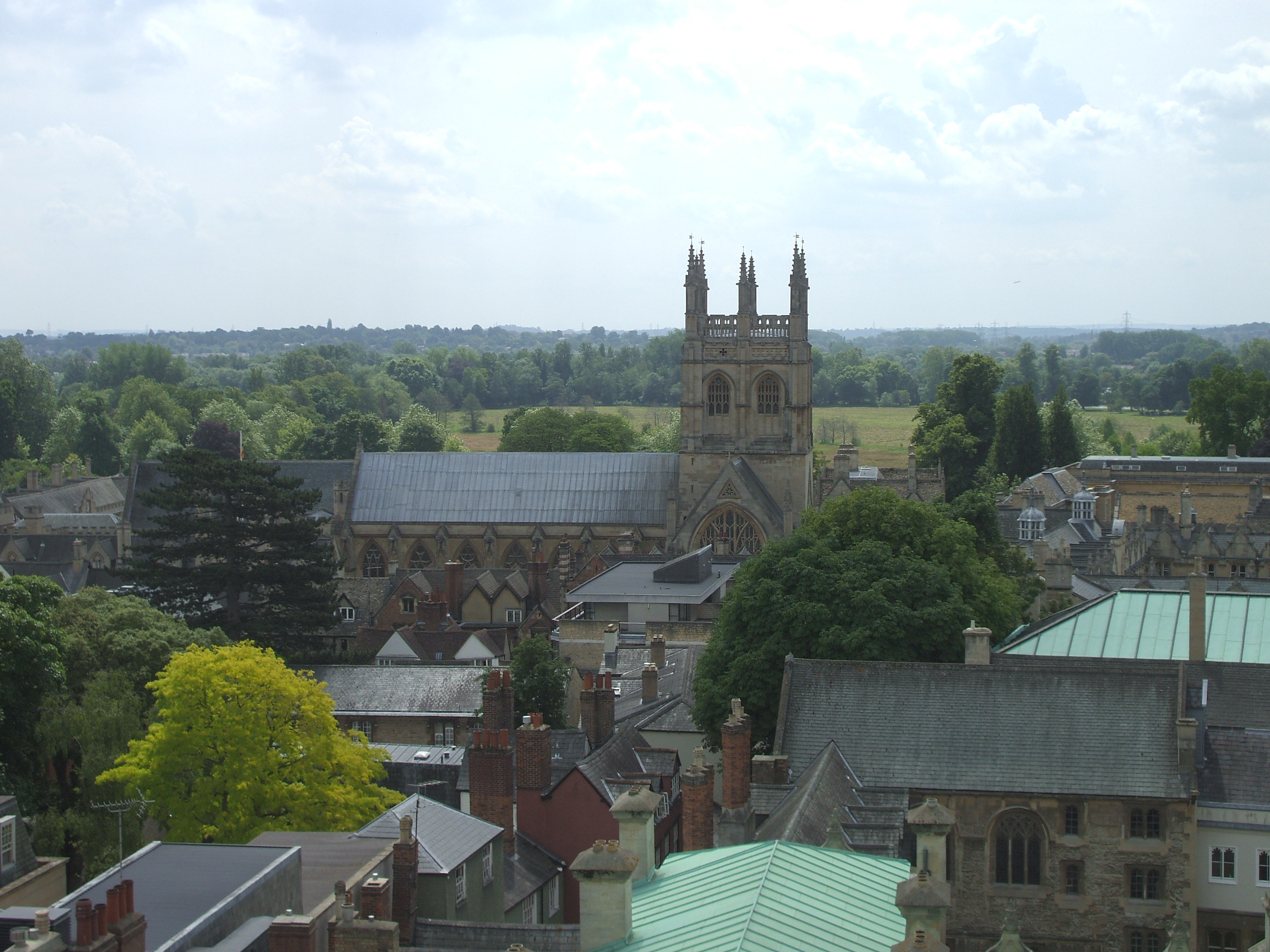
Merton viewed from the north from St Mary's Church

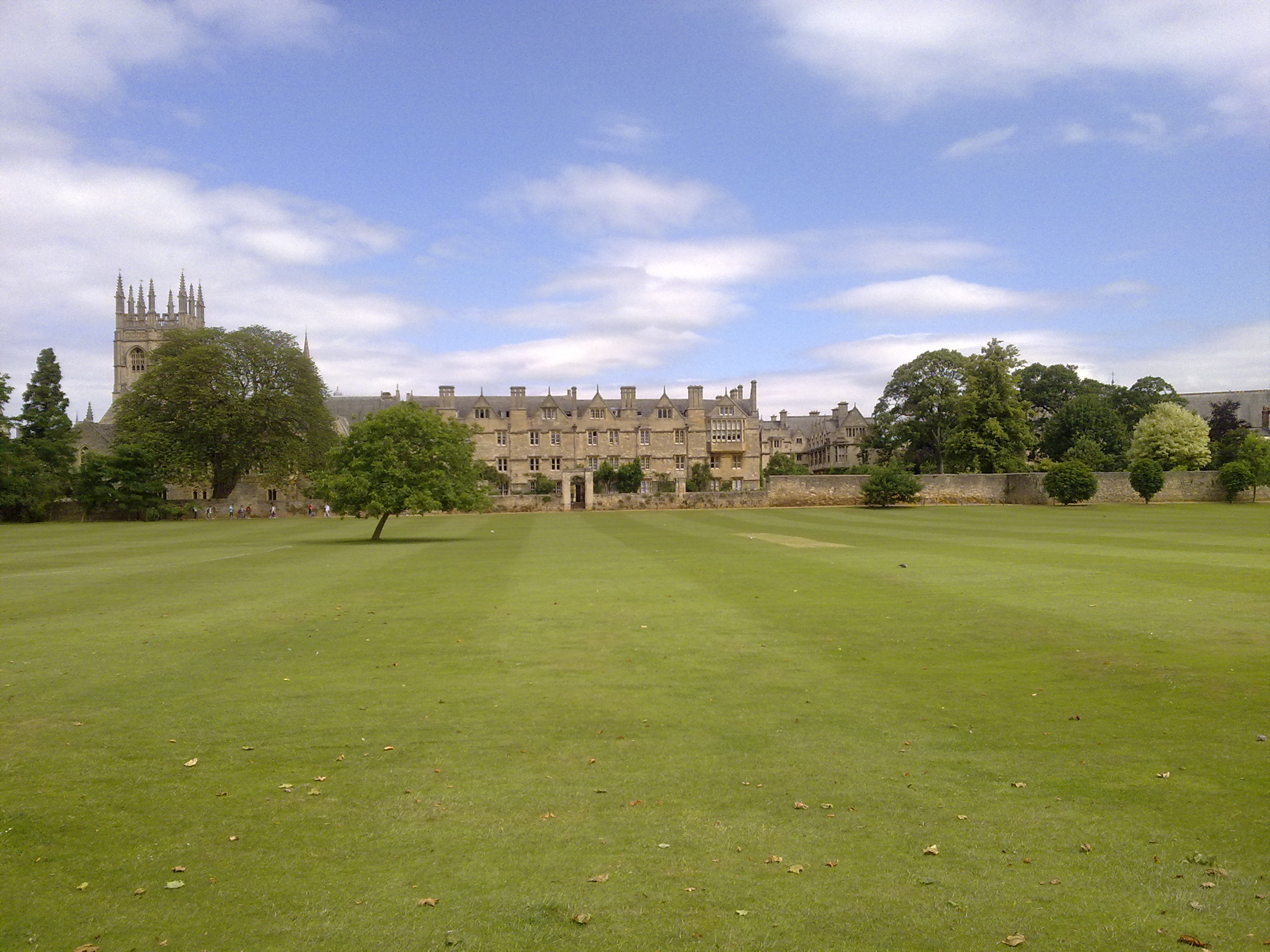
Merton viewed from across the Christ Church Meadow to the south

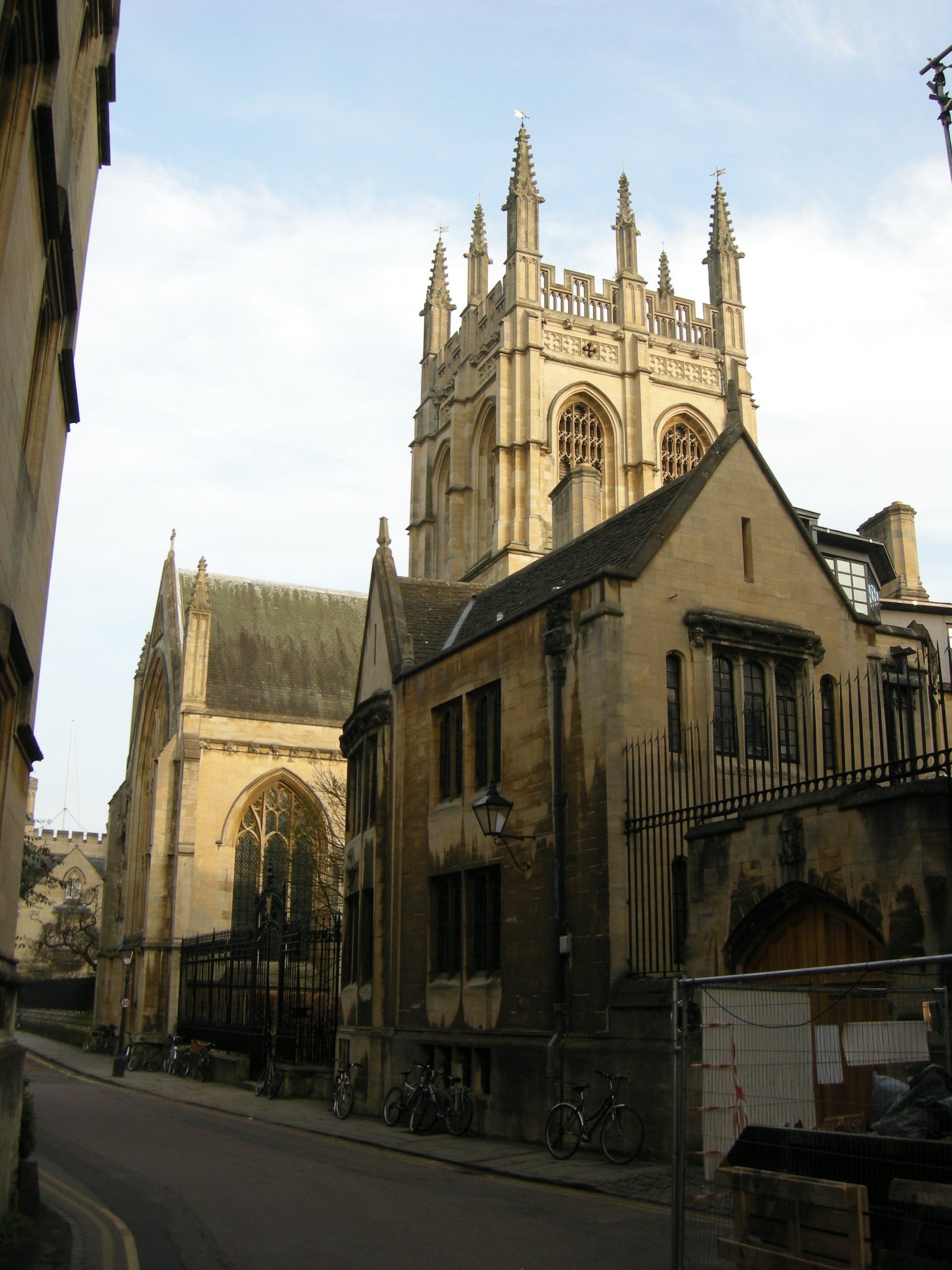
View of the chapel tower

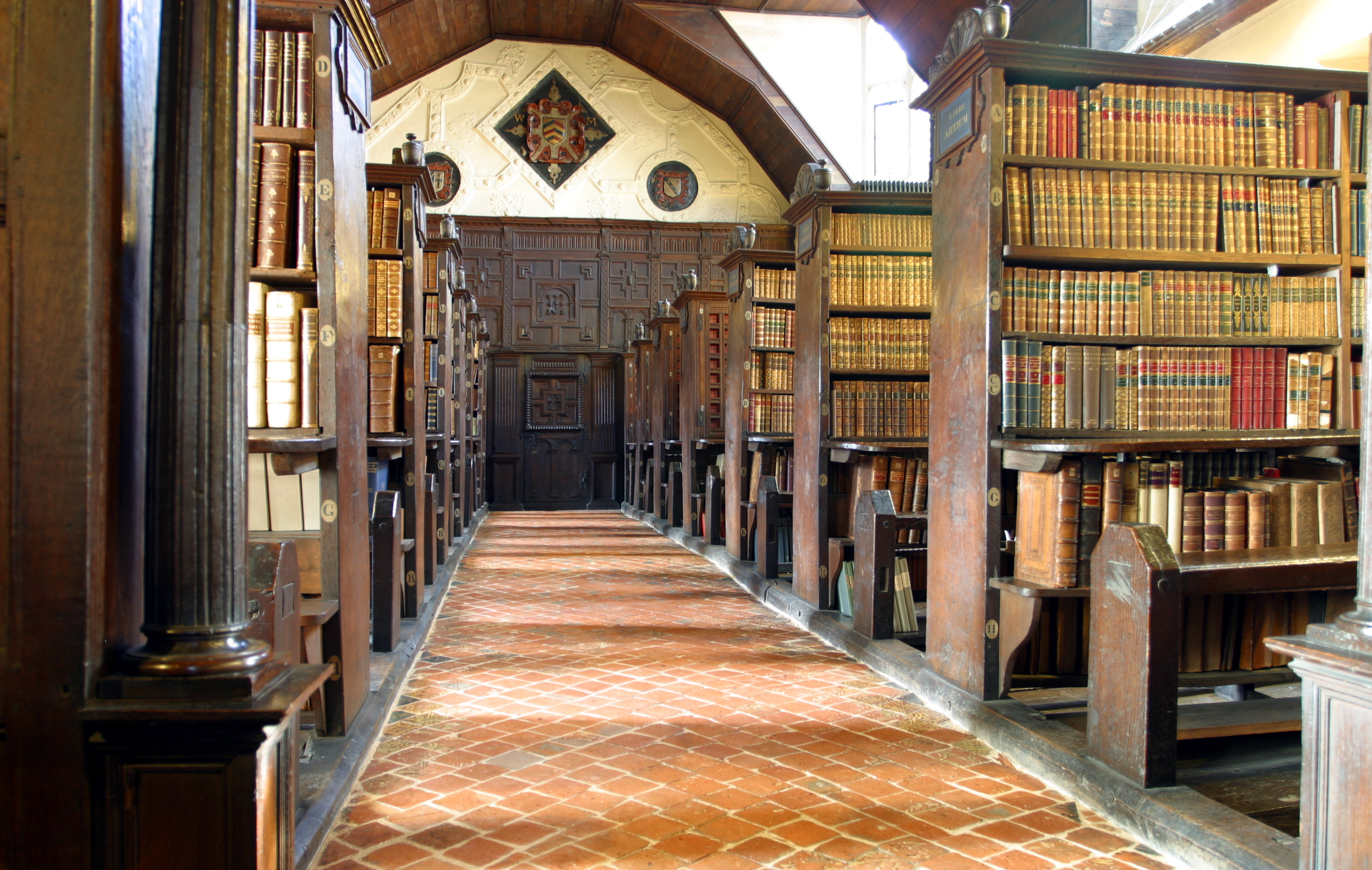
The south wing of the Upper Library

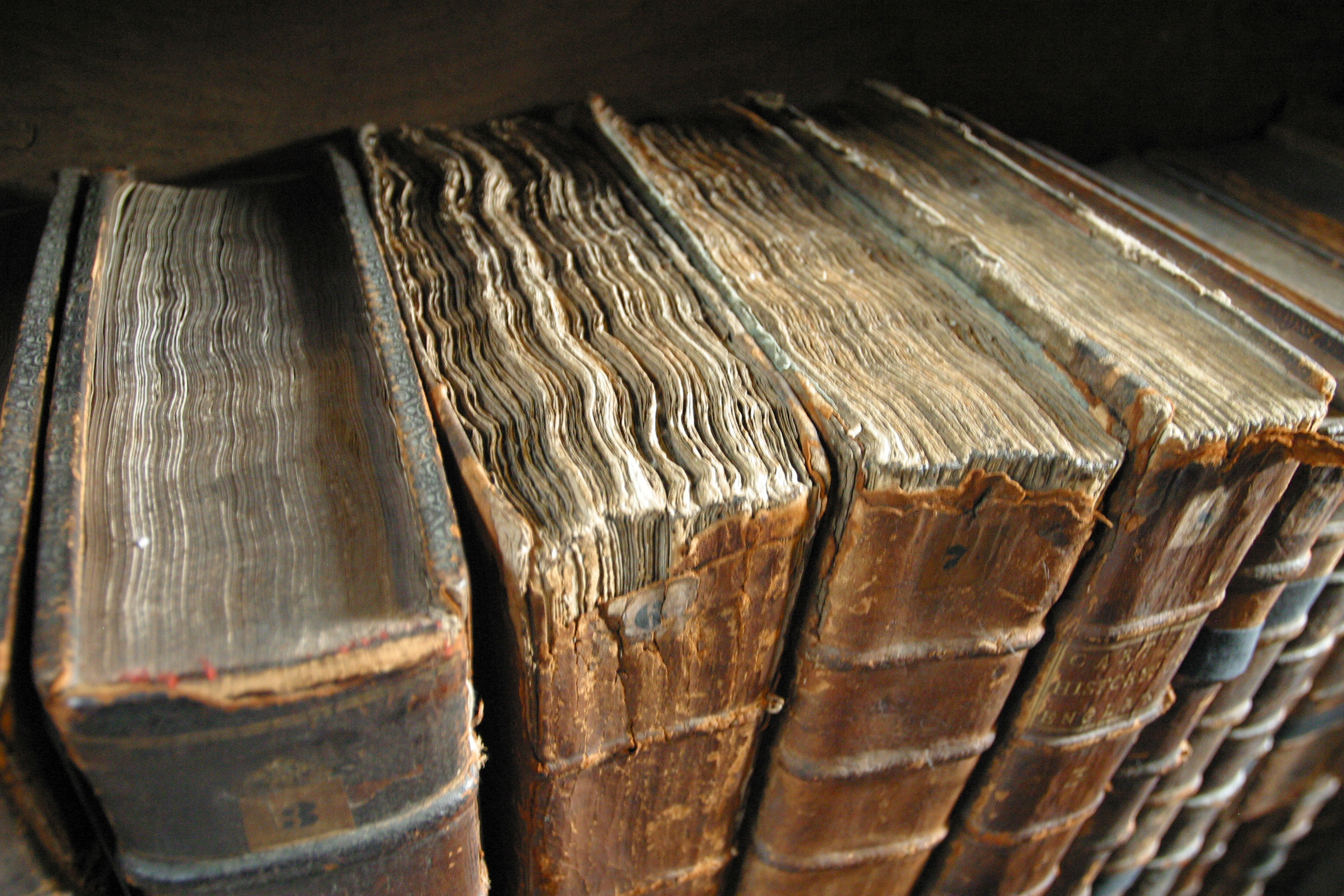
Old book bindings at the Merton College Library

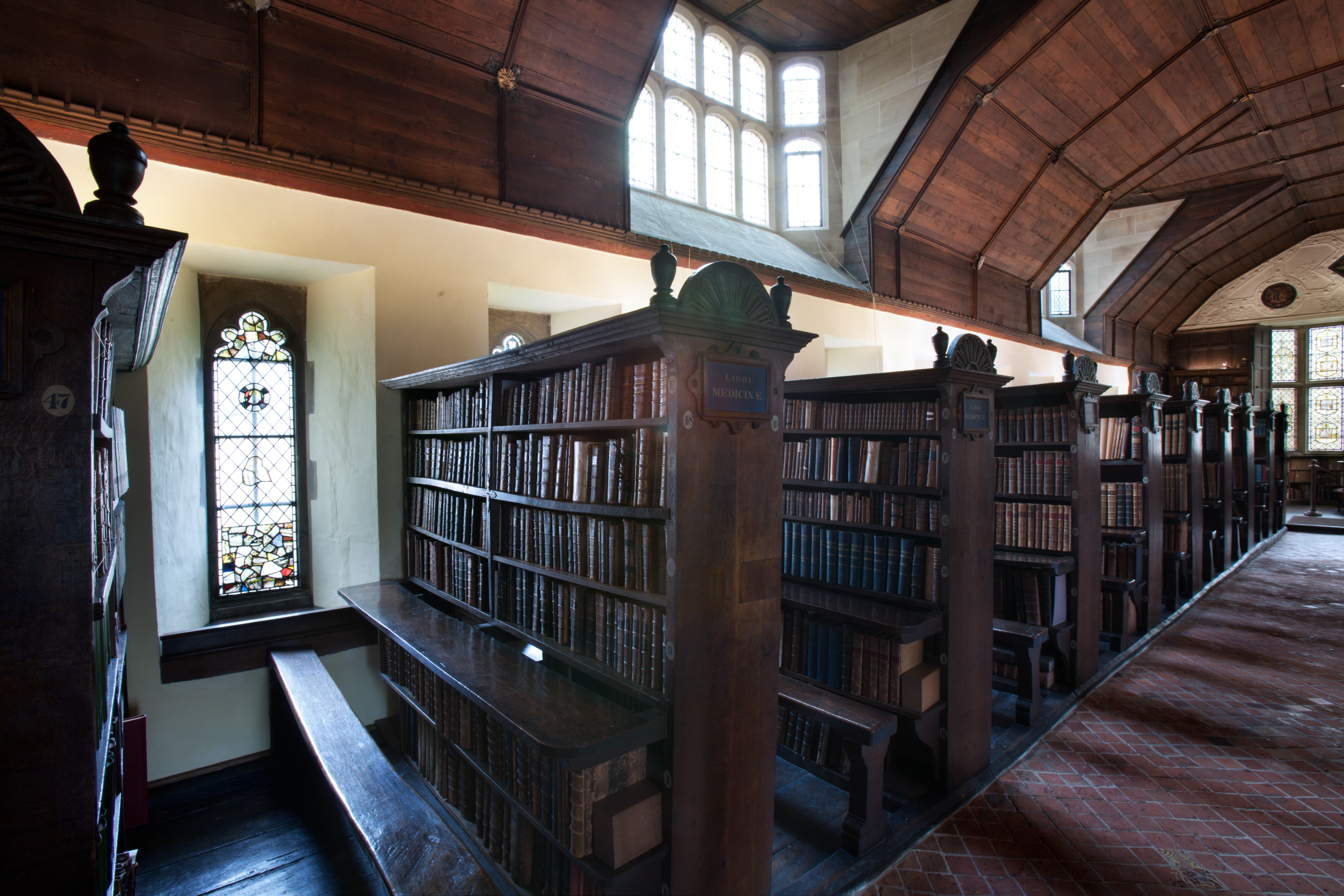
Bookshelves in the Library

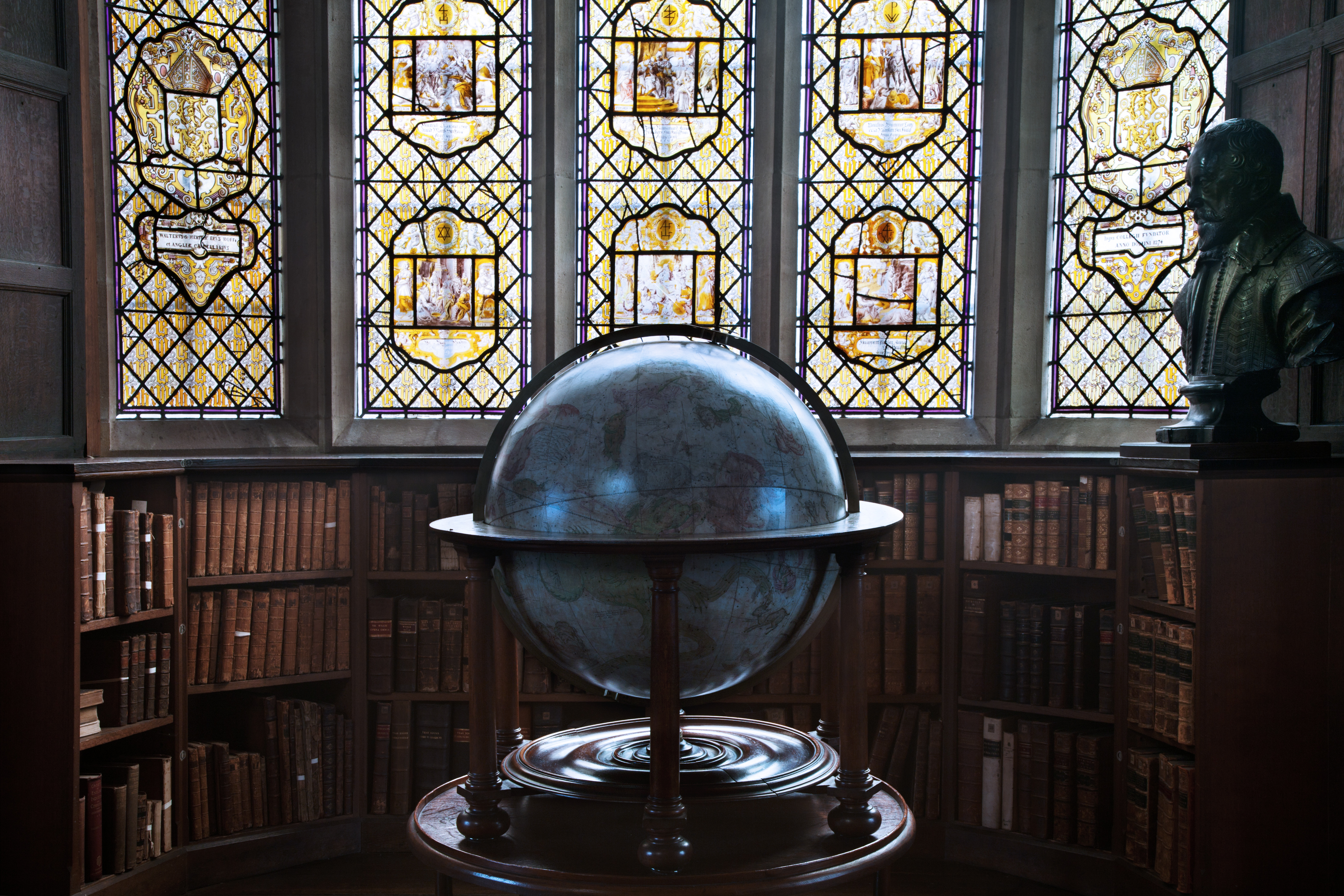
Globe dating from the 16th century

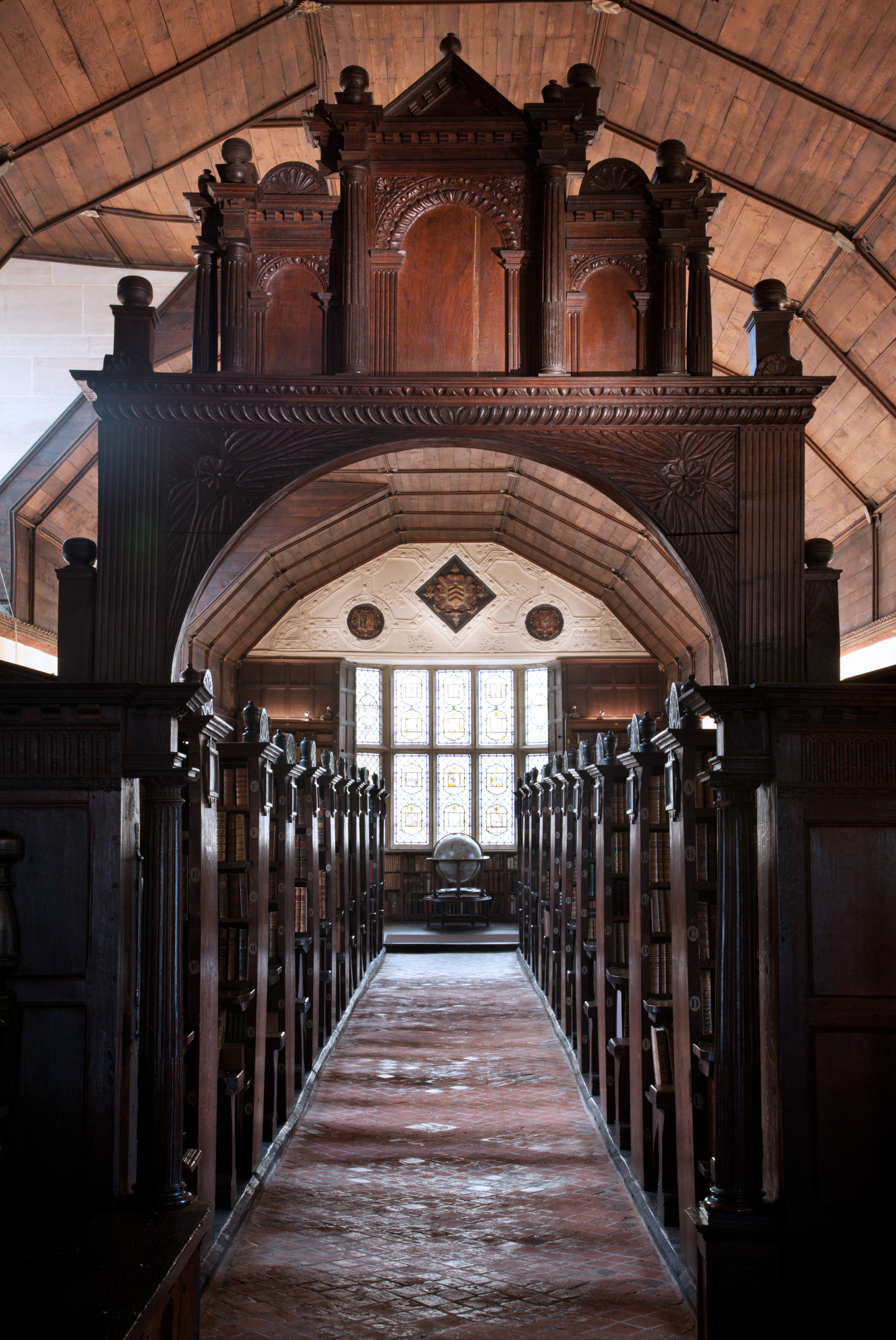
Library

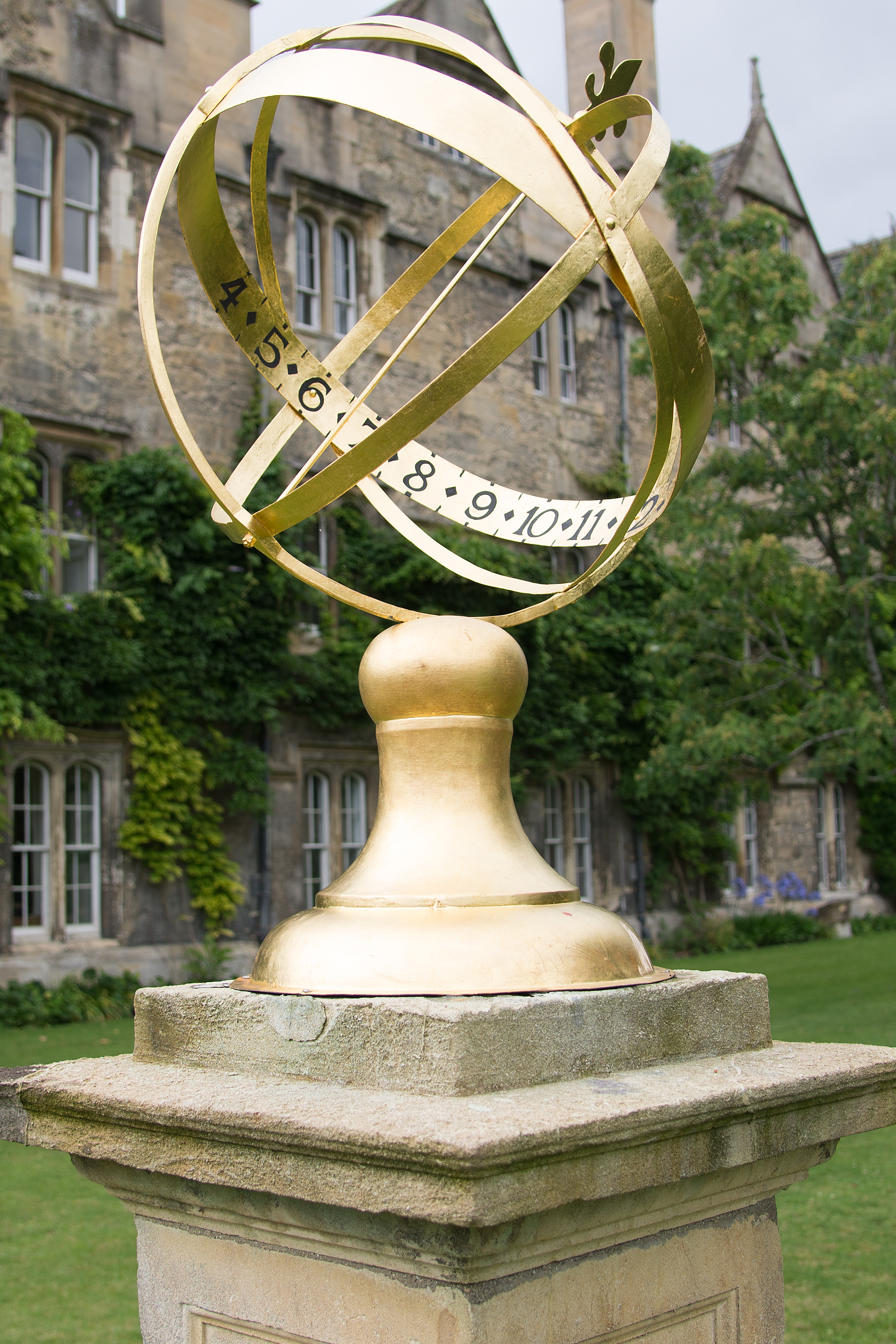
Sundial

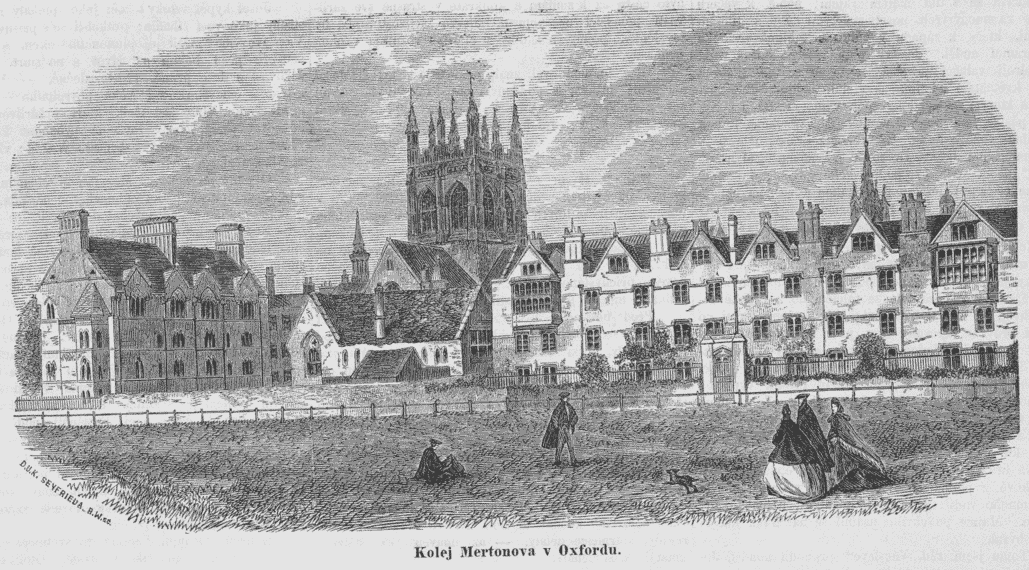
Merton in 1865

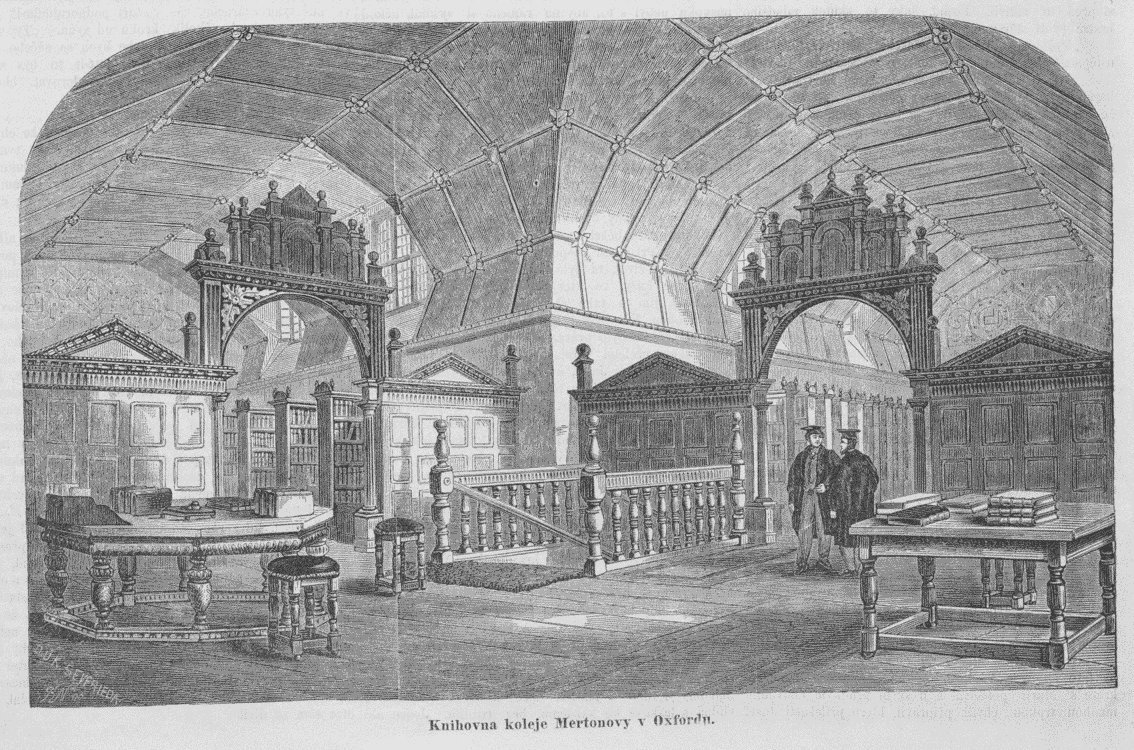
Merton College Library

== Student life ==
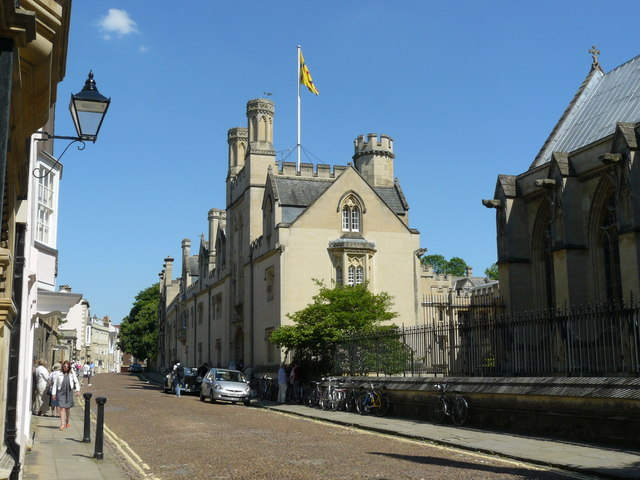
Merton Street

Merton admits both undergraduate and graduate students. It admitted its first female students in 1980 and was the second former male college to elect a female head of house (in 1994). Merton has traditionally had single-sex accommodation for first-year undergraduates, with female students going into the Rose Lane buildings and most male students going into three houses on Merton Street. This policy was abandoned in 2007, with all accommodation now mixed by sex and course.

Undergraduate admission to the college, like other Oxford colleges, is based solely on academic potential. In 2010, it was (incorrectly) reported that Merton had not admitted a black student in the previous five years. A university spokeswoman commented that black students were more likely to apply for particularly oversubscribed subjects. The university also reported that Merton had admitted at least one black undergraduate since 2005.

=== Reputation ===
Since the introduction of an official Norrington Table published by the university in 2004, Merton occupied one of the top three positions every year (often coming in 1st), until 2012 when it dropped to 14th. In 2014, it regained the first position, preserving its status as one of the most academically successful colleges of the last twenty years. In 2021, Merton was ranked Oxford's top college in the Norrington Table, with a score of 82.9.

=== Traditions ===
At the 'Time Ceremony', students dressed in formal academic dress walk backwards around the Fellows' Quad drinking port. Traditionally participants also held candles, but this practice has been abandoned in recent years. Many students have now adopted the habit of linking arms and twirling around at each corner of the quad. The alleged purpose of this tradition is to maintain the integrity of the space–time continuum during the transition from British Summer Time to Greenwich Mean Time, which occurs in the early hours of the last Sunday in October. However, the ceremony (invented by two undergraduates in 1971) mostly serves as a spoof of other Oxford ceremonies, and historically as a celebration of the end of the experimental period of British Standard Time from 1968 to 1971 when the UK stayed one hour ahead of GMT all year round. There are three toasts associated with the ceremony. The first is "to a good old time!"; the second, a joint toast to the sundial and the nearby mulberry tree (morus nigra), "o tempora, o more"; and the third, "long live the counter-revolution!".

Merton is the only college in Oxford to hold a triennial winter ball, instead of the more common Commemoration ball. The most recent of these was held on 29 November 2025.

=== Societies ===
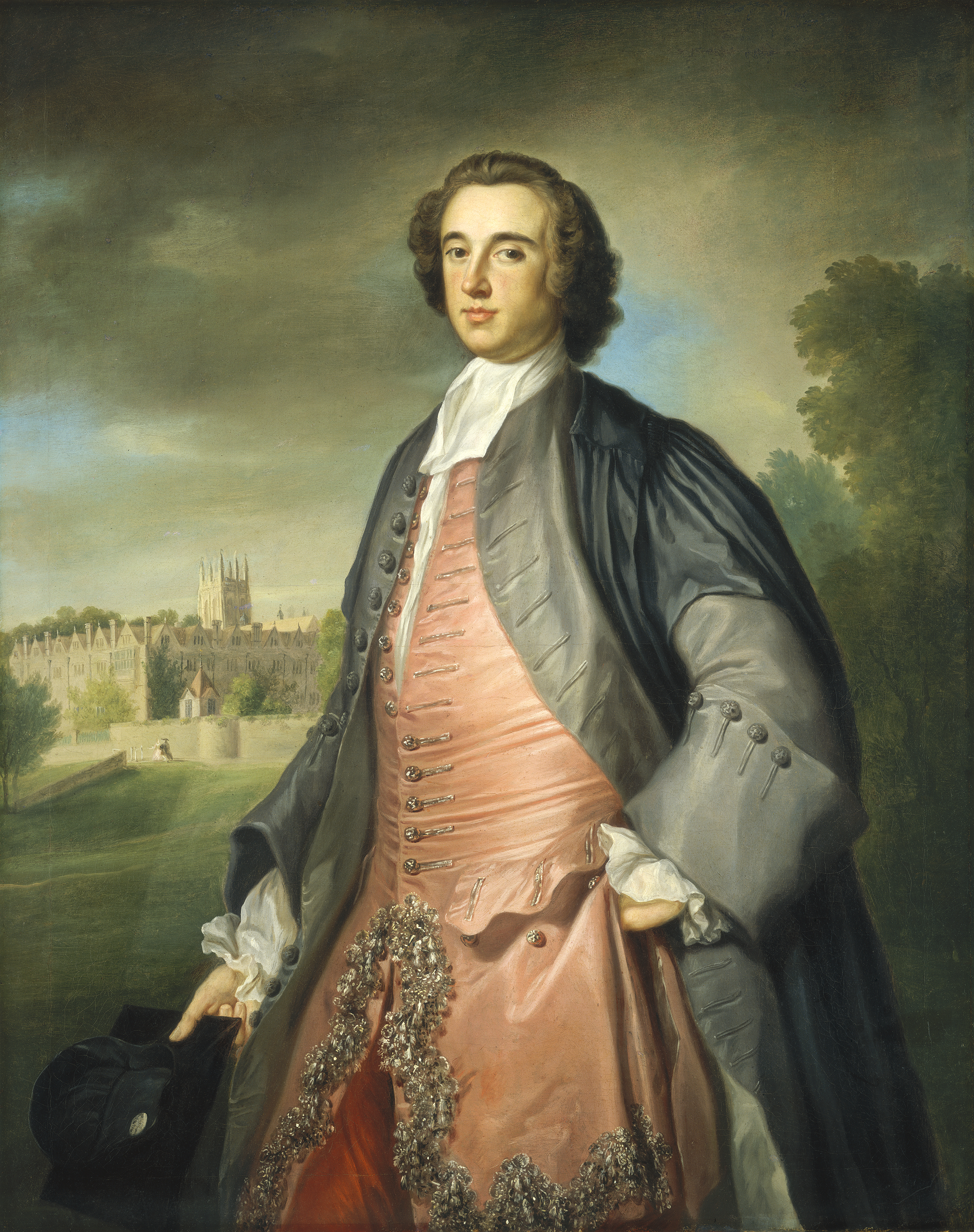
A Graduate of Merton College c. 1754/55 attributed to George Knapton

Merton has a number of drinking and dining societies, along the lines of other colleges. These include the all-male Myrmidons, the female-equivalent Myrmaids and L'Ancien Régime. The Myrmidon club is open to all members of the college in the present day, male or female, and hosts termly black tie events.

Merton is host to a number of subject-specific societies, the most notable being the Halsbury Society (Law) and the Chalcenterics (Classics). Other academic societies include the Neave Society, which aims to discuss and debate political issues, and the Bodley Club, founded in 1894 as a forum for undergraduate papers on literature but now a speaker society.

==== The Bodley Club ====
The Bodley Club is a speaker society at Merton College, Oxford. Founded in 1894 as a forum in which undergraduates delivered academic papers on literature, the club has changed form over the years, and was reformed in the 1980s as a speaker society. All members of the college, and usually members of the university as a whole, are invited to their events.

The club began on 19 May 1894 (though it was not christened 'The Bodley Club' until June). The initial constitution contained a rule (Rule 7) which stated that 'a written paper is preferred, but any member may speak on any literary subject instead or may propose that any literary work be read at the meeting.' It was not long before this provision was required, as the minute-book reveals in its entry for 19 October 1894: 'Owing to unpardonable slackness on the part of members, the four months of vacation proved insufficient to collect coherent ideas on any particular subject...However an agreeable and instructive evening was passed in reading Tennyson's 'Maud'.' From early years the club has maintained a troubled existence, and the Secretary noted on 1 November 1900 a motion of censure 'against a person or persons unknown who were responsible for the undoubted blackness which is creeping over the Bodley Club.' Nevertheless, the club has continued in one form or another to the present day.

Among the notable papers delivered to the Bodley Club are those by Frederic Harrison, Harold Henry Joachim, Henry Hamilton Fyfe (brother of the secretary, William), Northrop Frye, Alister Clavering Hardy, and Ronald Knox. Several of the club's first members went on to become significant figures, including Herbert George Flaxman Spurrell and William Hamilton Fyfe.

=== Sports ===
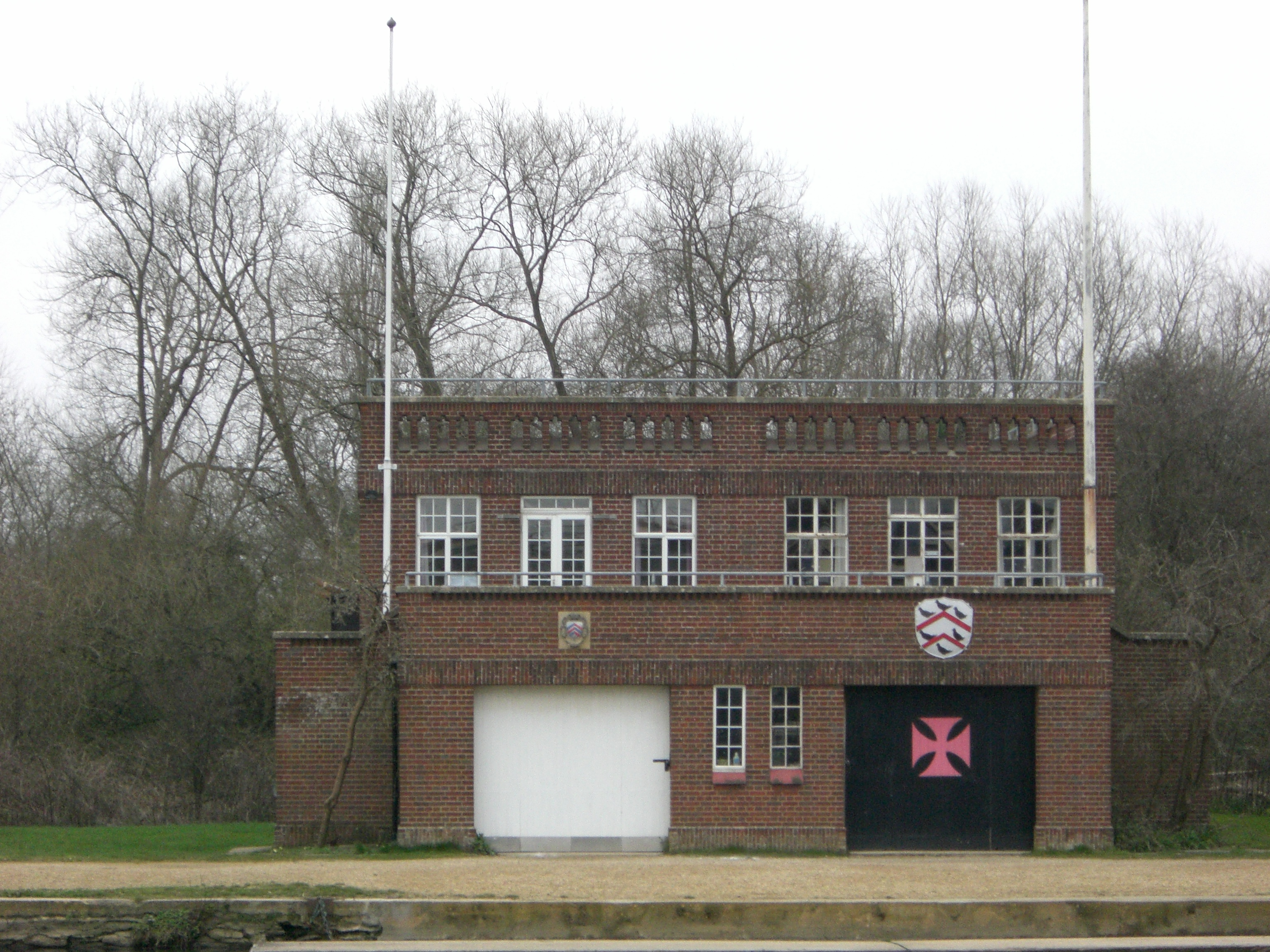
The college boathouse on Boathouse Island, on the northern bank of the Isis

Merton has a long-standing sporting relationship with Mansfield College, with the colleges fielding amalgamated sports teams for many major sports. In rowing, Merton College Boat Club has been Head of the River in Summer Eights once; its men's 1st VIII held the headship in 1951. Merton's women have done better in recent years, gaining the headship in Torpids in 2003 and rowing over to defend the title in 2004.

== Grace ==
The college preprandial (pre-meal) grace is amongst the longest in Oxford, and is always recited before formal dinners in Hall, usually by the senior postmaster present. The first two lines of the Latin text are based on verses 15 and 16 of Psalm 145.

Oculi omnium in te respiciunt, Domine. Tu das escam illis tempore opportuno.
Aperis manum tuam, et imples omne animal benedictione tua.
Benedicas nobis, Deus, omnibus donis quae de tua beneficentia accepturi simus.
Per Jesum Christum dominum nostrum, Amen.

Roughly translated it means:

The eyes of the world look up to thee, O Lord. Thou givest them food in due season.
Thou openest thy hand and fillest every creature with thy blessing.
Bless us, O God, with all the gifts which by thy good works we are about to receive.
Through Jesus Christ, Our Lord, Amen.

For the relevant verses of the Psalm, the Authorized Version has:

15. The eyes of all wait upon thee; and thou givest them their meat in due season.
16. Thou openst thine hand, and satisfiest the desire of every living thing.

In contrast, Merton's post-prandial grace is brief: Benedictus benedicat ("Let him who has been blessed, give blessing"). The latter grace is spoken by the senior Fellow present at the end of dinner on High Table.

At the University of Cambridge, a slightly different version of the Latin text of these verses is painted around Old Hall in Queens' College, Cambridge, and is "commonly in use at other Cambridge colleges".

== People associated with Merton ==
Merton alumni (Mertonians) and fellows have pursued careers in a variety of disciplines.

=== 1264 to 1900 ===
Among the earliest people that have been claimed as Merton fellows are William of Ockham and Duns Scotus, outstanding academic figures from the early 14th century (however, these claims are disputed). Other early fellows include the Oxford Calculators, a group of 14th-century thinkers associated with Merton who took a logico-mathematical approach to philosophical problems. Theologian and philosopher John Wycliffe was another early fellow of the college.

Founder of the Bodleian Library, Thomas Bodley, was admitted as fellow in 1564. Another significant figure, Henry Savile, was appointed Warden some years later in 1585 (held the position until 1621) and had great influence of the development of the college. William Harvey, who was the first to describe in detail the systemic circulation, was warden from 1645 to 1646. Lord Randolph Churchill, Chancellor of the Exchequer and Leader of the House of Commons (and father of Winston Churchill), matriculated in October 1867, while Max Beerbohm, an English essayist, parodist, and caricaturist studied at Merton in the 1890s and was Secretary of the Myrmidon Club.

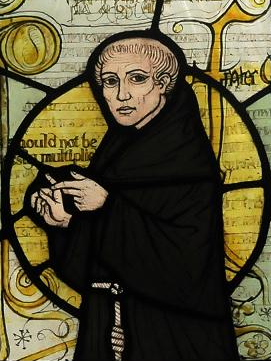
William of Ockham, major figure of medieval thought, commonly known for Occam's razor

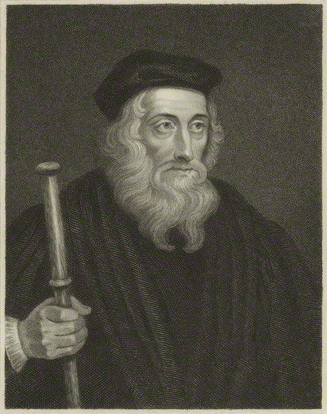
John Wycliffe, early dissident in the Roman Catholic Church during the 14th century

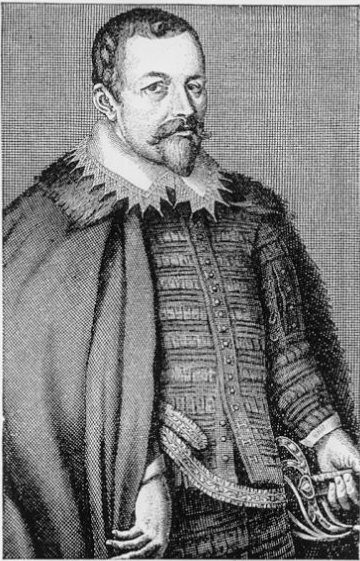
Thomas Bodley, diplomat, scholar, founder of the Bodleian Library

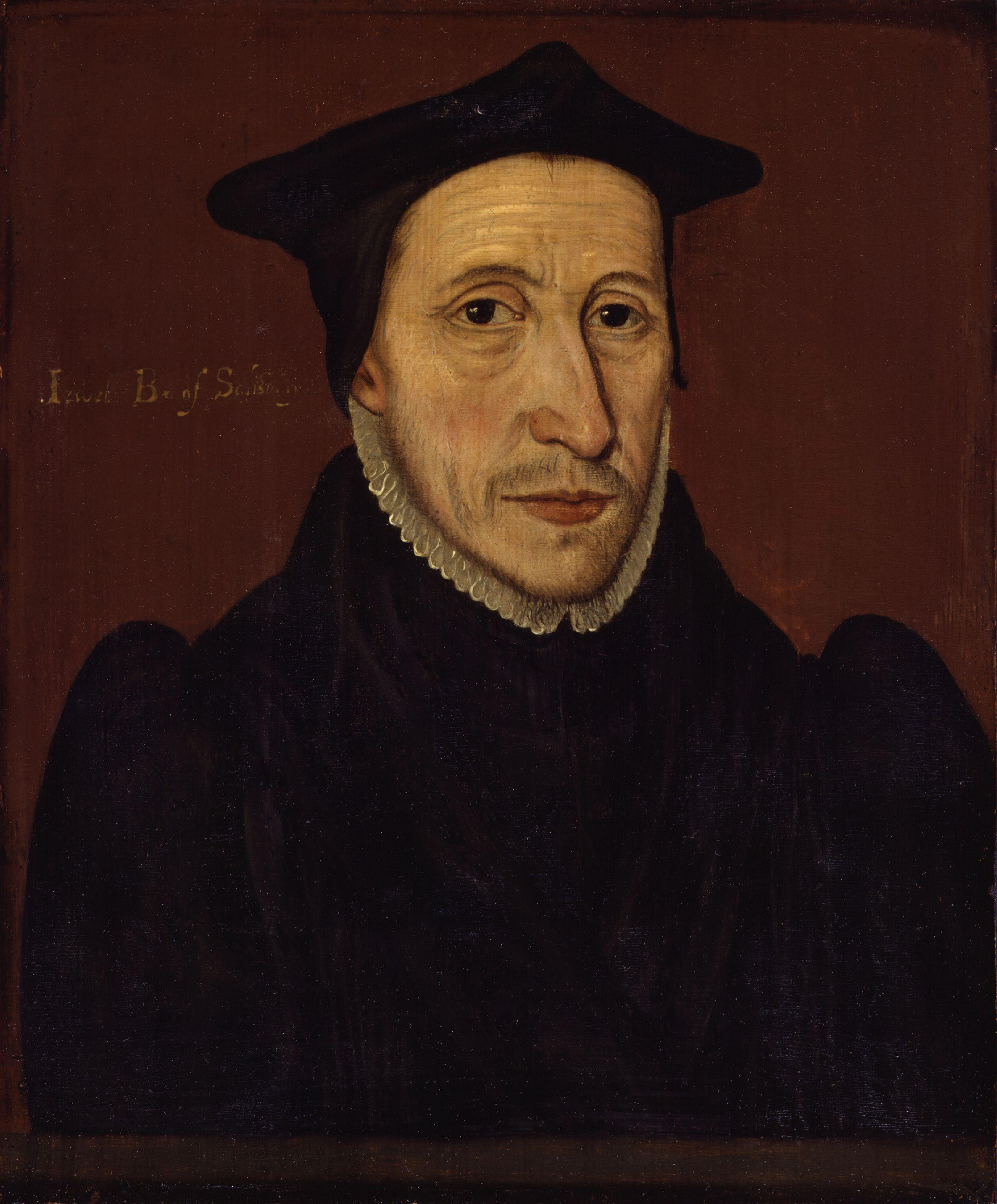
John Jewel, Bishop of Salisbury and Anglican divine

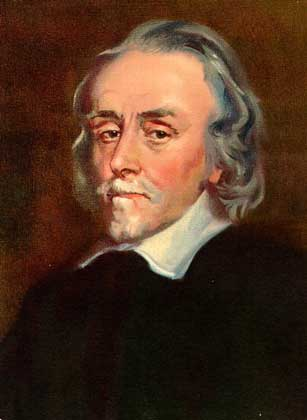
William Harvey, the first to describe in detail the systemic circulation

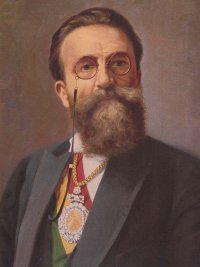
José Gutiérrez Guerra, President of Bolivia between 1917 and 1920

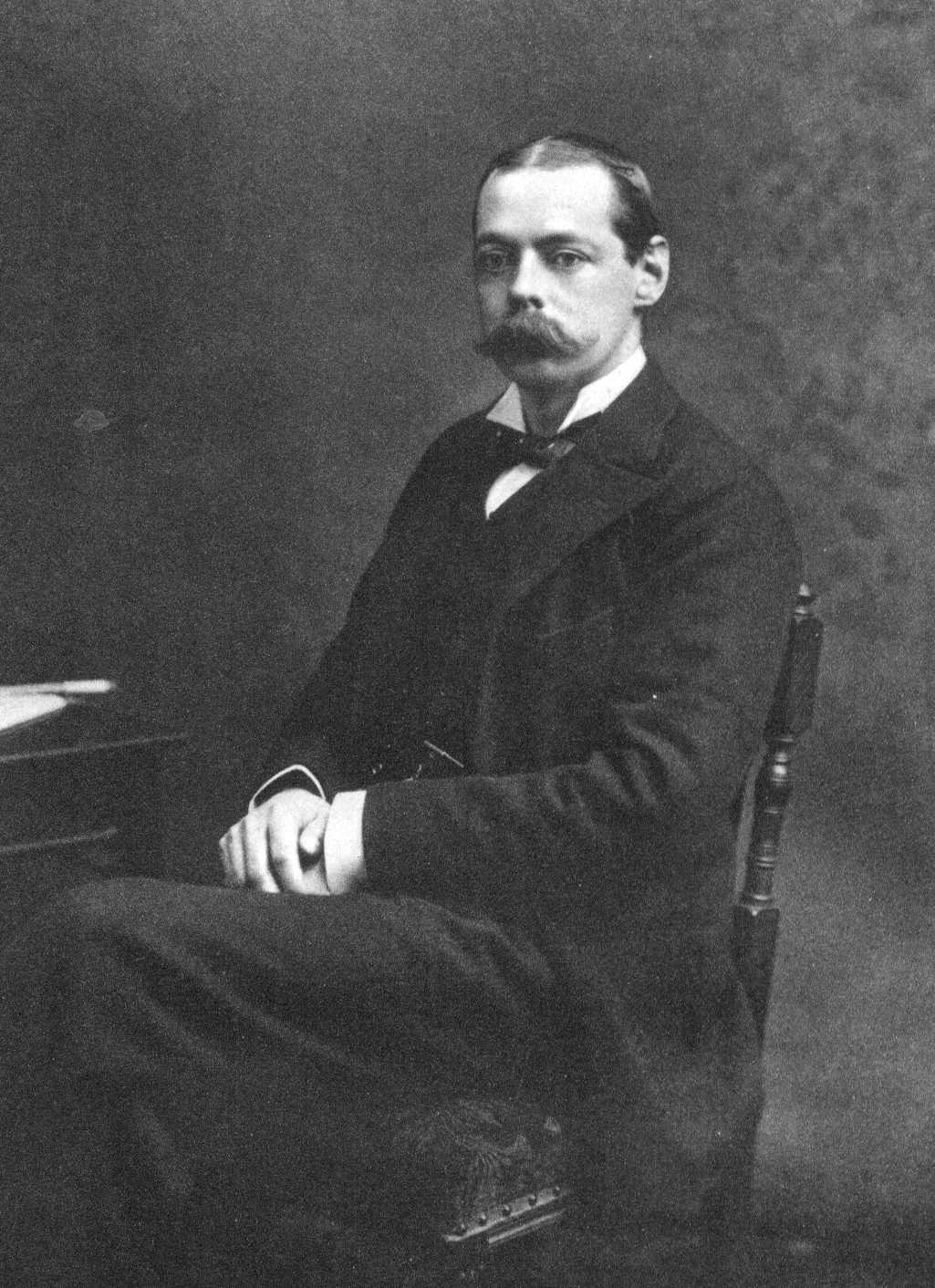
Lord Randolph Churchill, British statesman, father of Winston Churchill

Max Beerbohm, essayist and caricaturist (self-caricature from 1897)

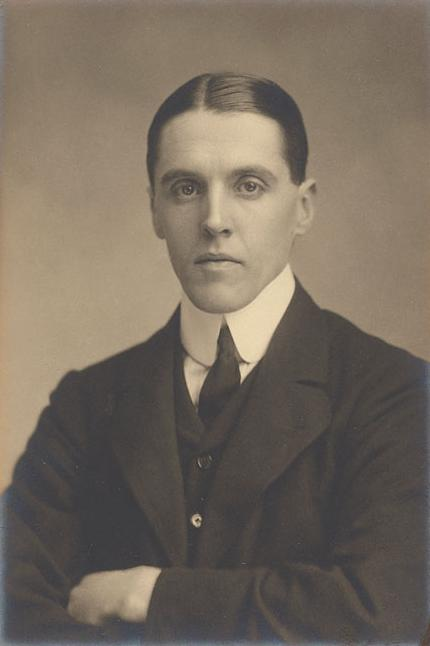
F.E. Smith, 1st Earl of Birkenhead, Conservative statesman and friend of Winston Churchill

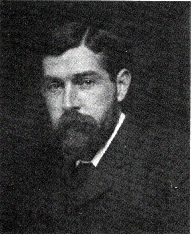
Francis Herbert Bradley, British idealist philosopher

=== 1900 to today ===
Merton has also produced notable alumni and fellows in more recent times. In science, Merton is associated with four Nobel Prize winners: chemist Frederick Soddy (1921), zoologist Nikolaas Tinbergen (1973), physicist Anthony Leggett (2003) and physicist Anton Zeilinger (2022). Other Mertonians in science include Canadian neurosurgeon Wilder Penfield, mathematician Andrew Wiles who proved Fermat's Last Theorem, computer scientist Tony Hoare, chemist George Radda, economist Catherine Tucker, geneticist Alec Jeffreys and cryptographer Artur Ekert.

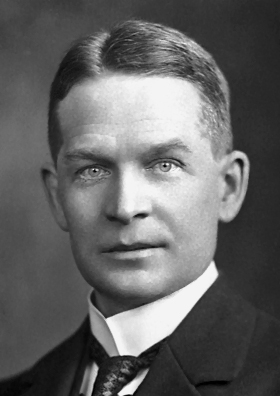
Frederick Soddy, awarded the Nobel Prize in Chemistry in 1921

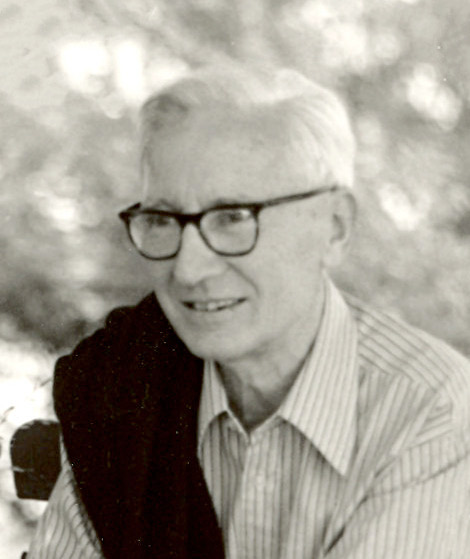
Nikolaas Tinbergen, awarded the Nobel Prize in Physiology or Medicine in 1973

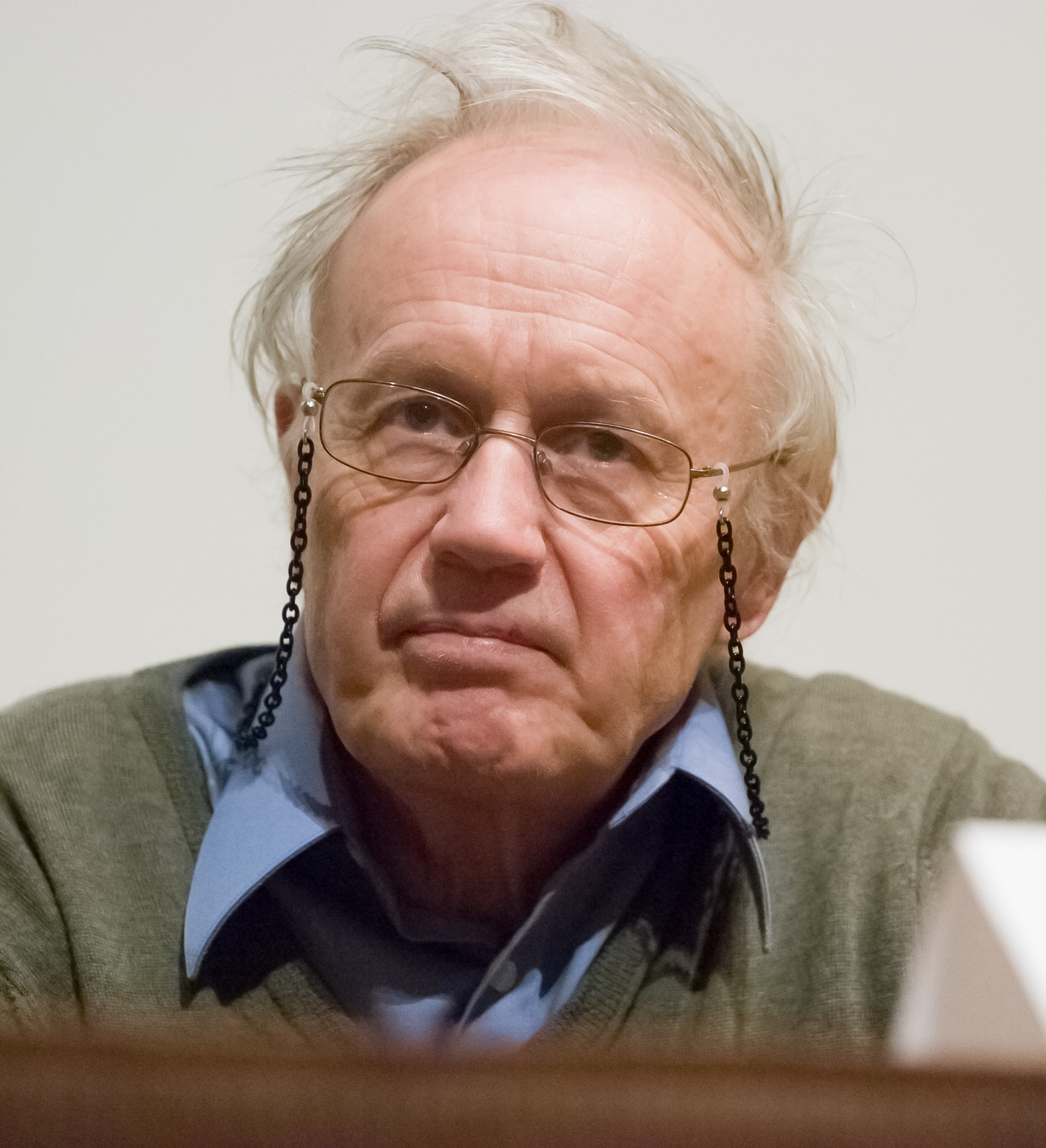
Anthony James Leggett, awarded the Nobel Prize in Physics in 2003

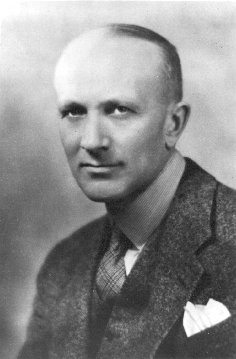
Wilder Penfield, neurosurgeon, once dubbed "the greatest living Canadian"

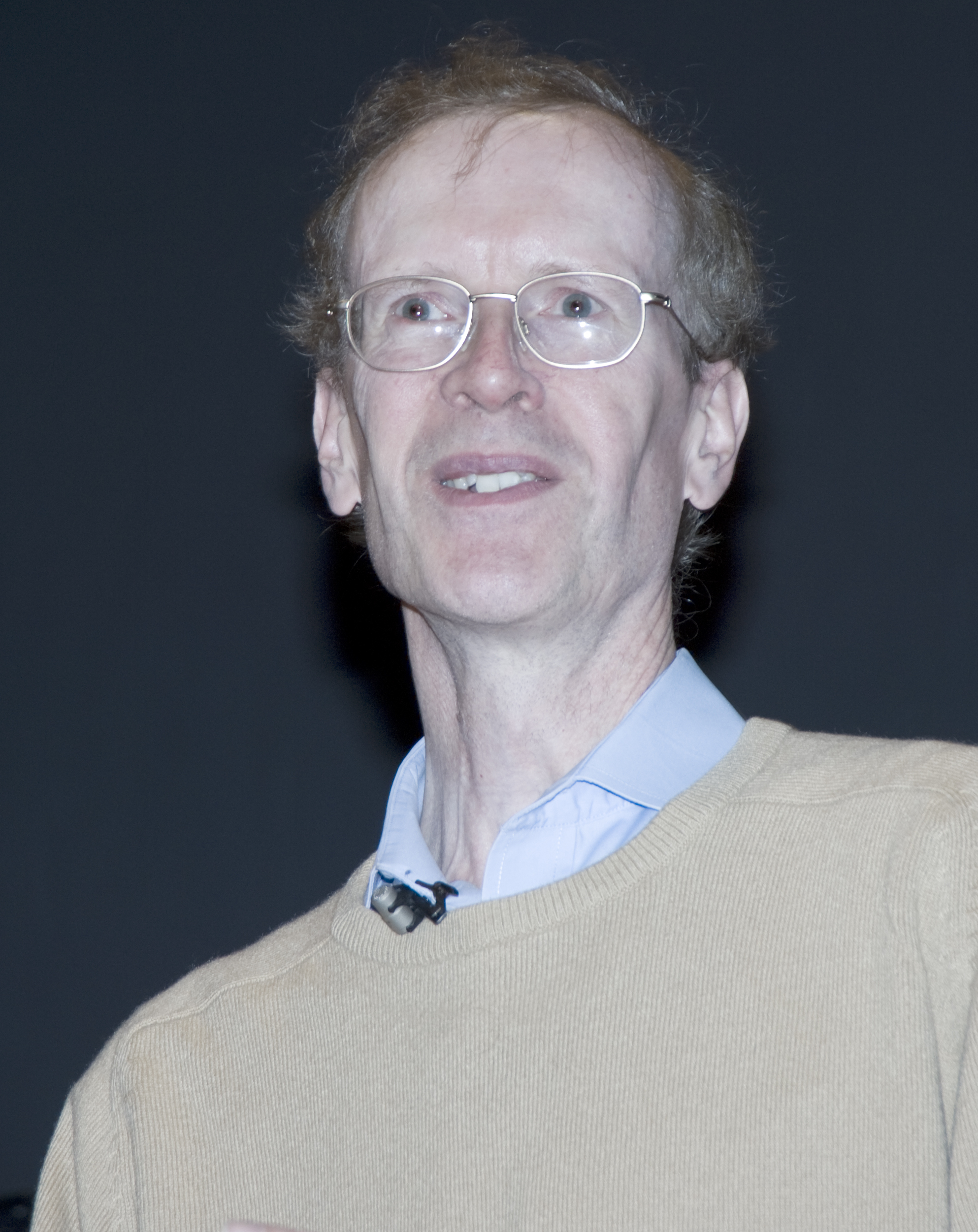
Sir Andrew Wiles, mathematician notable for proving Fermat's Last Theorem. Winner of the 2016 Abel Prize

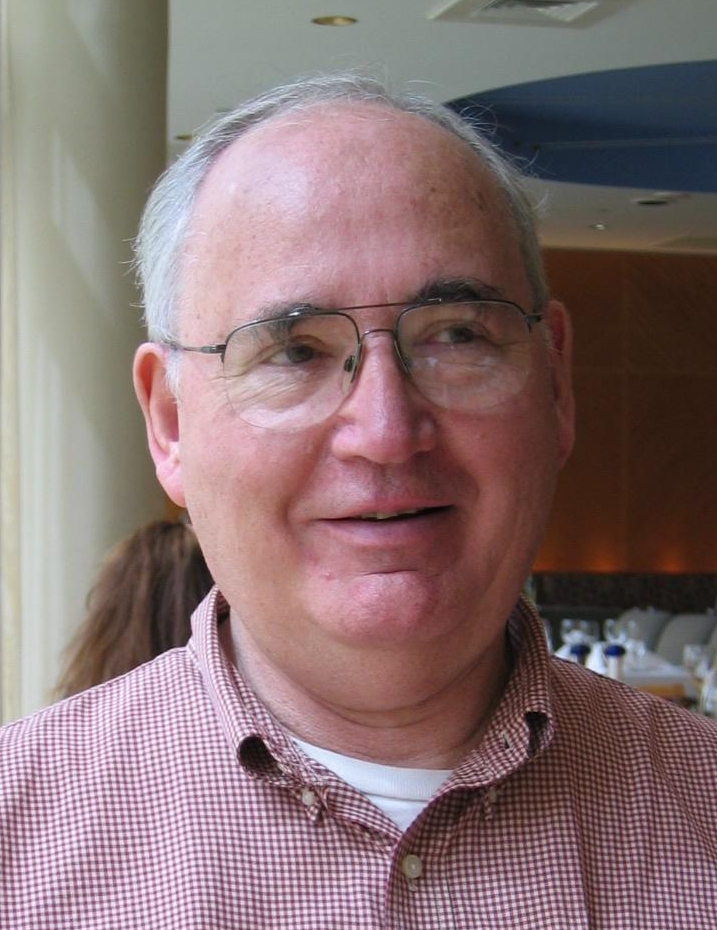
Dana Scott, computer scientist known for his work on automata theory and denotational semantics. Winner of the 1976 Turing Award

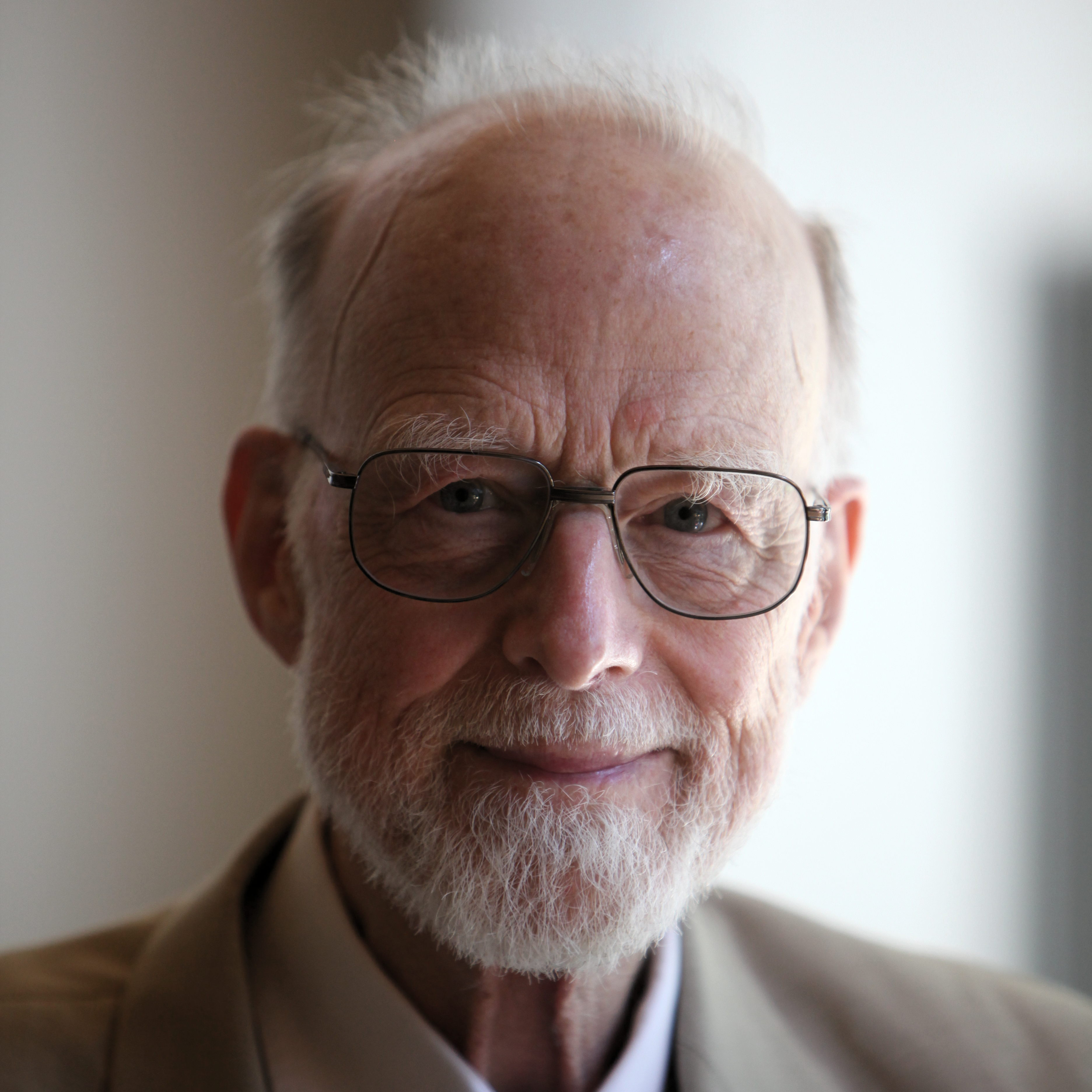
Sir Tony Hoare, computer scientist known for Quicksort, Hoare logic and CSP. Winner of the 1980 Turing Award

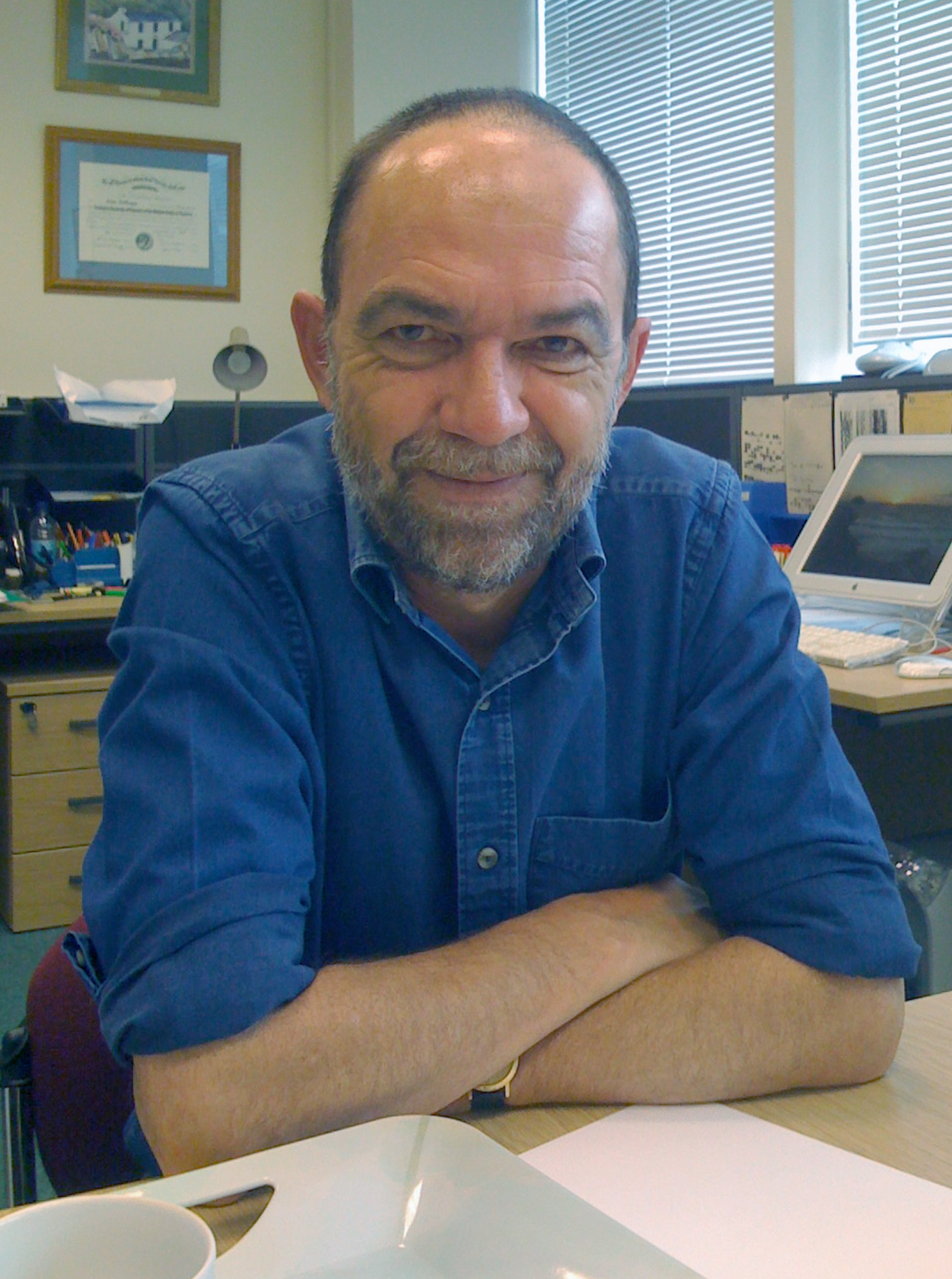
Sir Alec Jeffreys, geneticist known for his work on DNA fingerprinting and DNA profiling

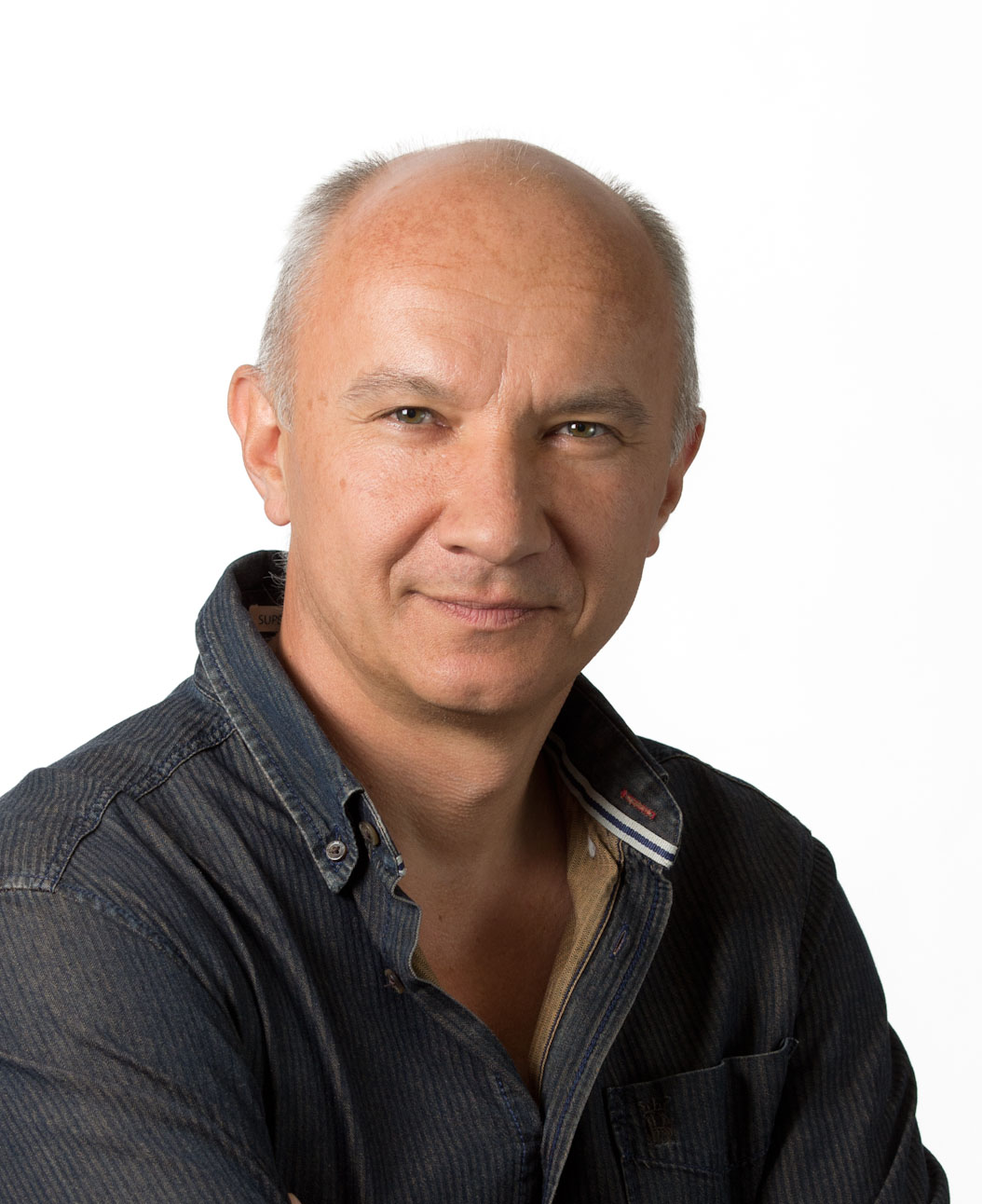
Artur Ekert, cryptographer and one of the inventors of quantum cryptography

Notable Mertonians within the field of literature include poet T. S. Eliot, who won the Nobel Prize in Literature in 1948, and author J. R. R. Tolkien who was Merton Professor of English Language and Literature and Fellow of Merton from 1945 to 1959. Jamaican-British Professor of Sociology Stuart Hall was a pioneer in the academic field of cultural studies and director of the Centre for Contemporary Cultural Studies.

Former students with careers as politicians include British politicians Reginald Maudling, Airey Neave, Jesse Norman, Ed Vaizey, Denis MacShane, Alan Strickland, Liz Truss and Peter Tapsell, while international alumni include Bob Krueger, former U.S. Senator from Texas, and Arthur Mutambara, former Deputy Prime Minister of Zimbabwe.

In business, former Director-General of the BBC and later CEO of the New York Times Company Mark Thompson, CEO of Stonewall Ben Summerskill and former CEO of Sony Howard Stringer are alumni. In law, Henry Litton served as one of the first Permanent Judges of the Court of Final Appeal of Hong Kong (Hong Kong's court of last resort), while Brian Leveson was President of the Queen's Bench Division from 2013 to 2019 and Head of Criminal Justice.

Other alumni include the composer Lennox Berkeley, actor and singer-songwriter Kris Kristofferson, mountaineer Andrew Irvine, RAF pilot Leonard Cheshire, athlete and neurologist Roger Bannister (later Master of Pembroke College, Oxford), journalist Tanya Gold and Naruhito, Emperor of Japan.

Oxford-born clinical neuroscientist Irene Tracey was elected as Warden in succession to Martin J. Taylor (former professor of pure mathematics at the University of Manchester) on his retirement in 2018, and served until the start of her tenure as Vice-Chancellor of the University of Oxford in 2023.

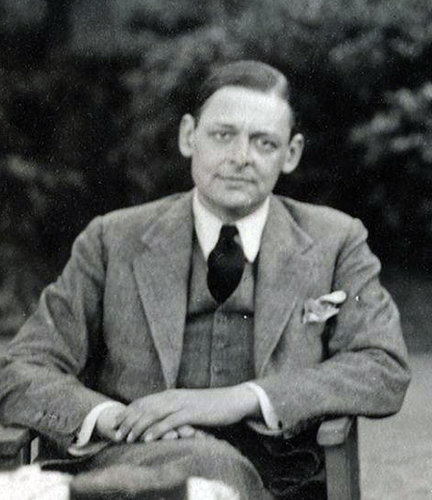
T. S. Eliot, awarded the Nobel Prize in Literature in 1948

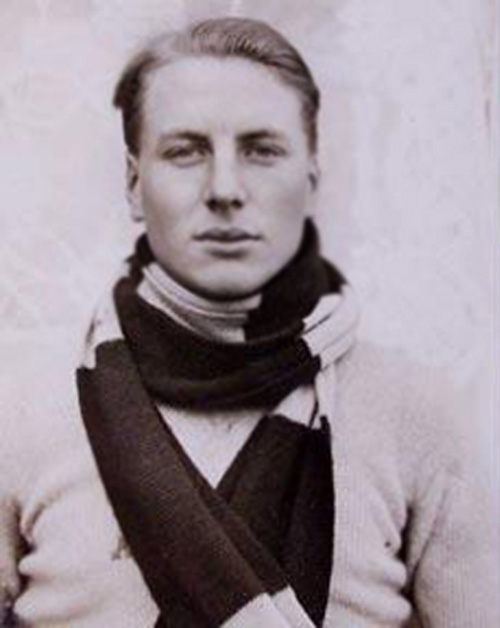
Andrew Irvine, English mountaineer who died on the British Mount Everest Expedition 1924

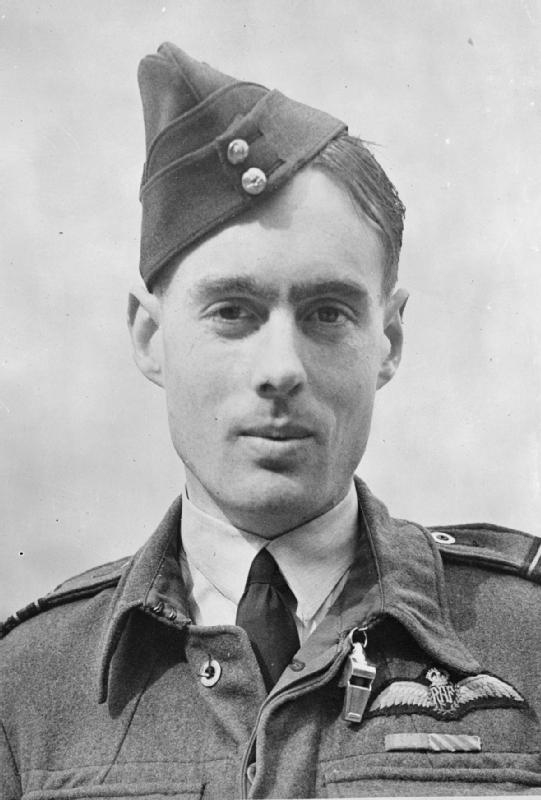
Leonard Cheshire, highly decorated British RAF pilot during the Second World War

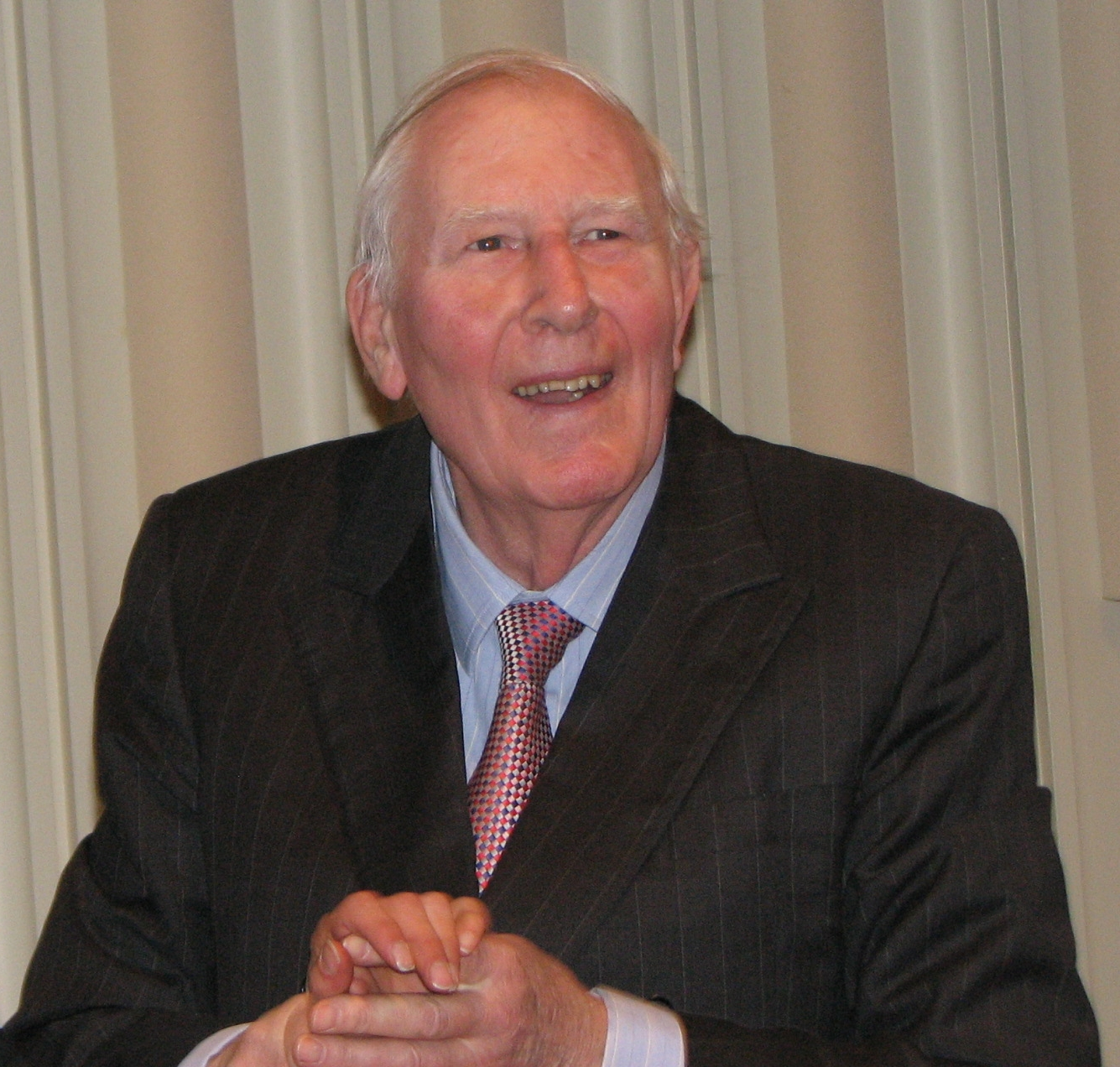
Roger Bannister, athlete, doctor and academic, who ran the first sub-four-minute mile

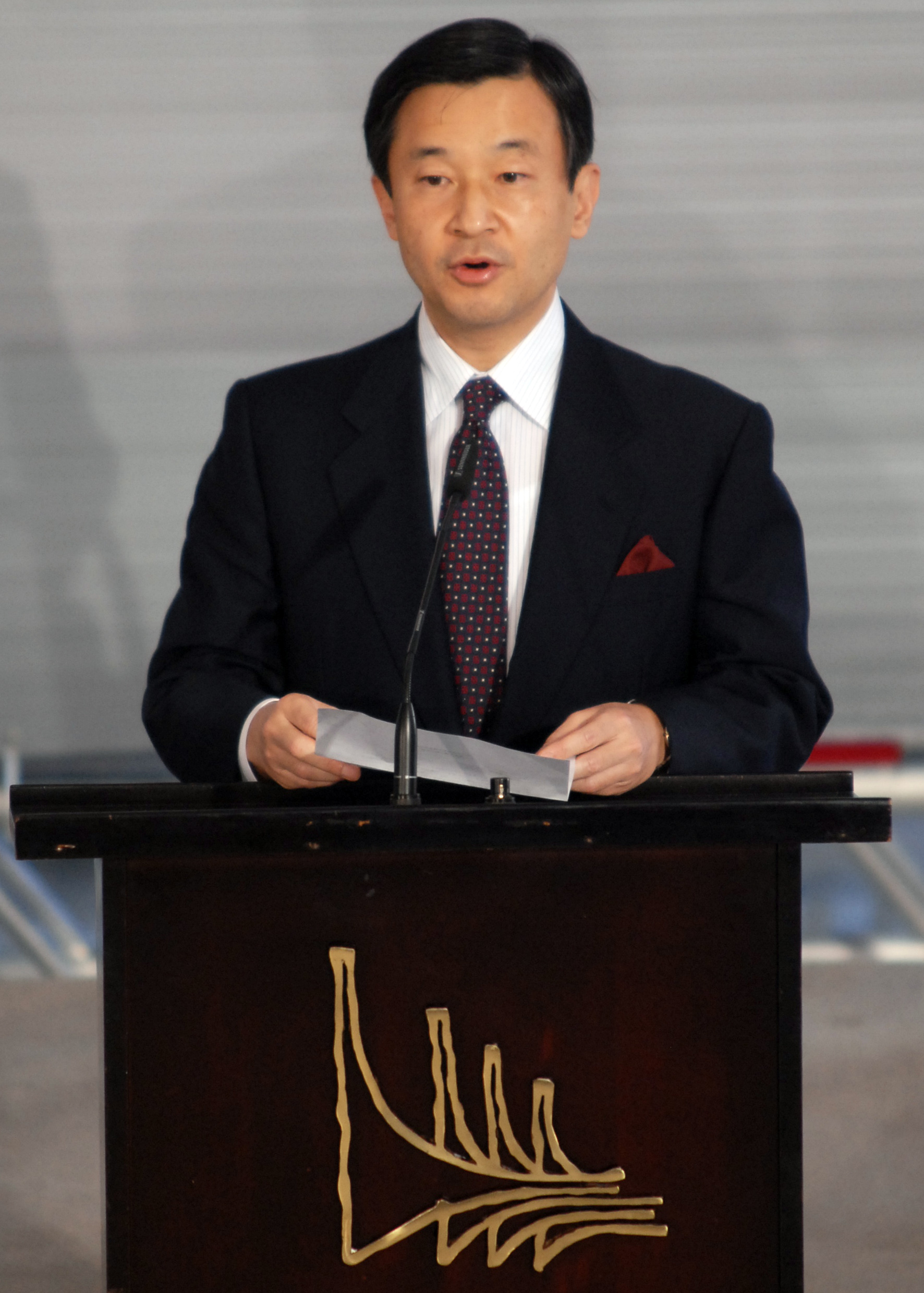
Naruhito, Emperor of Japan

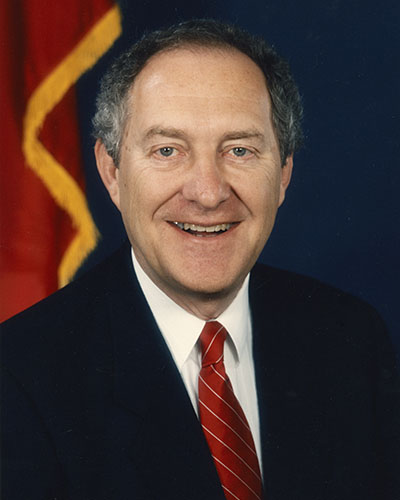
Bob Krueger, former U.S. Senator from Texas

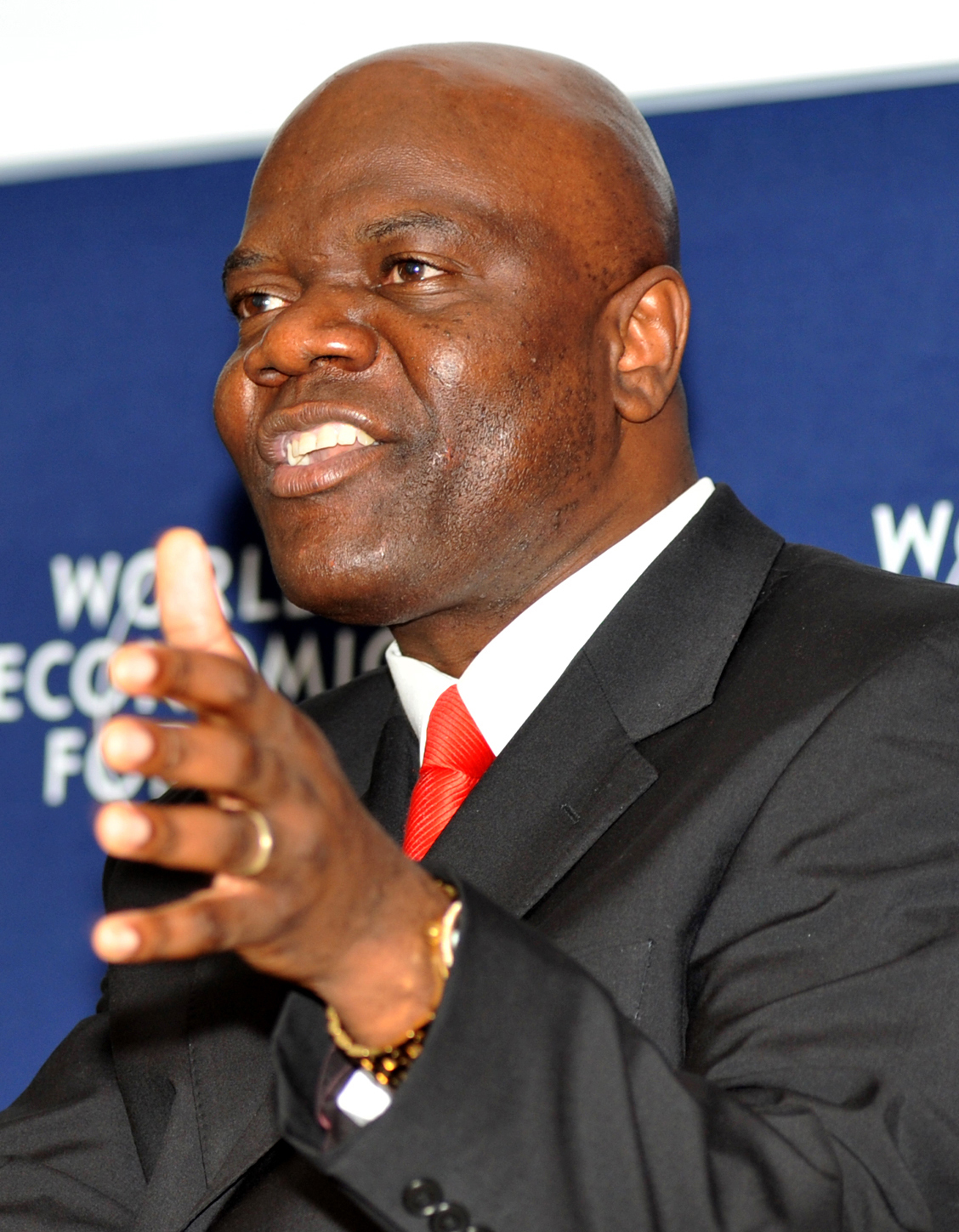
Arthur Mutambara, Zimbabwean politician and former Deputy Prime Minister of Zimbabwe

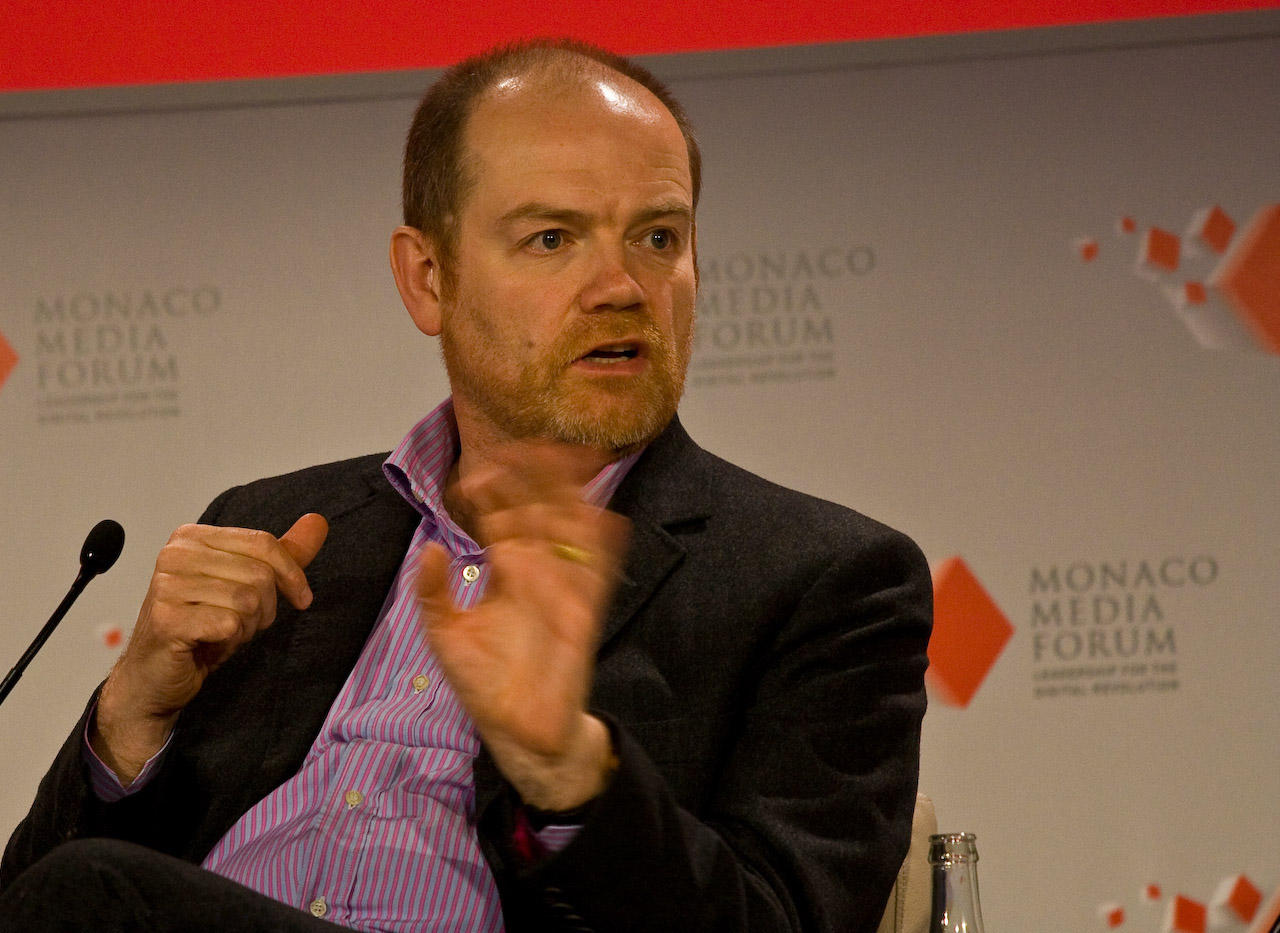
Mark Thompson, CEO of The New York Times Company and former Director-General of the BBC

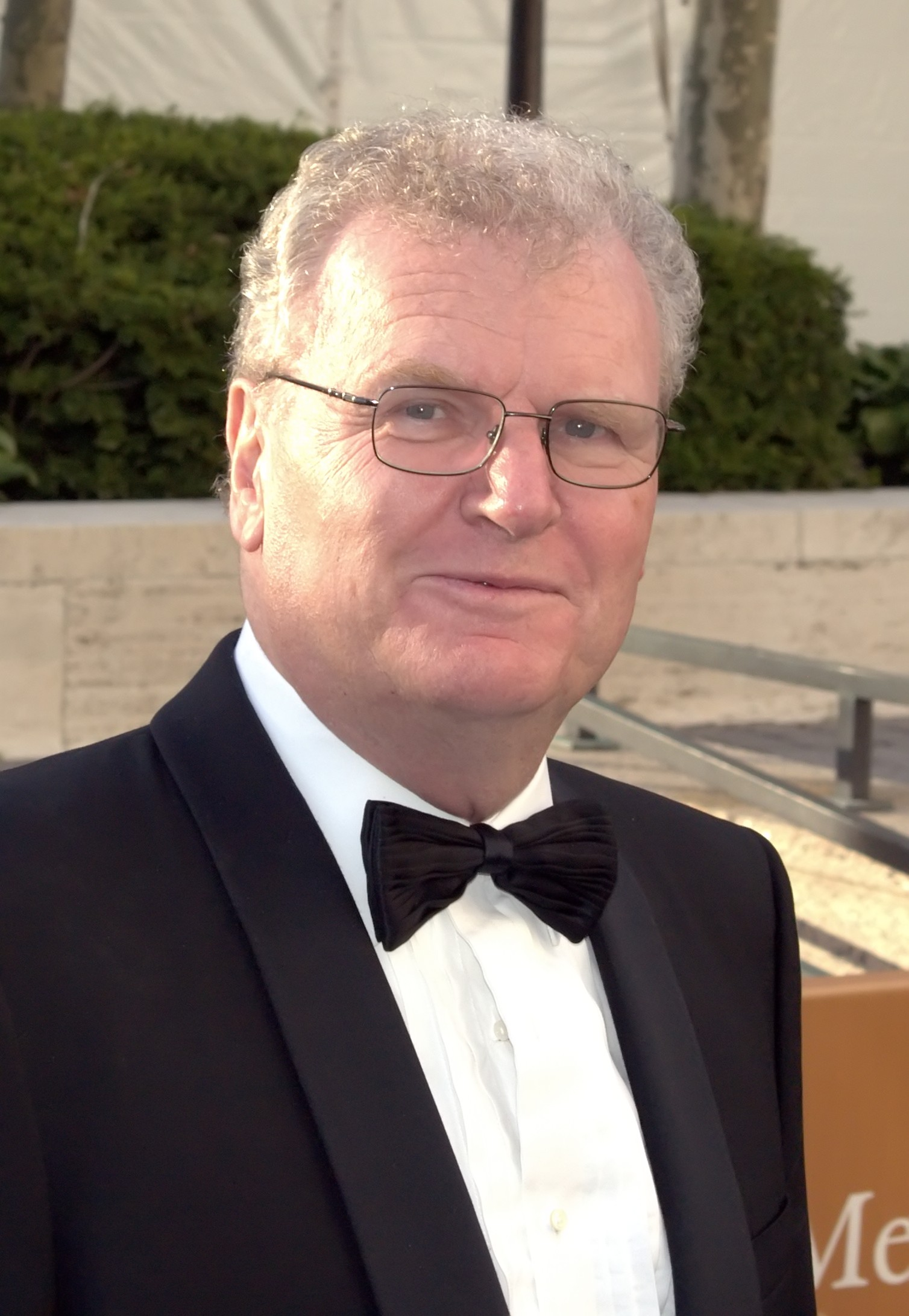
Howard Stringer, former CEO of Sony Corporation

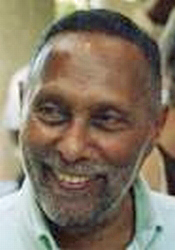
Stuart Hall, Professor of Sociology and influential cultural theorist (active audience theory)

=== Women at Merton ===
Just like the other ancient colleges of Oxford, Merton was originally an all-male college. It admitted its first female students in 1980 and became the second former all-male college to elect a female head of house when Jessica Rawson was appointed as Warden in 1994. Professor Irene Tracey was appointed as Merton's second female warden in 2019, and later became Oxford's second female vice-chancellor. She was succeeded by another woman as warden, Jennifer Payne.

Alumnae of Merton include the shortest-serving prime minister of the United Kingdom in history Liz Truss and Princess Akiko of Mikasa.

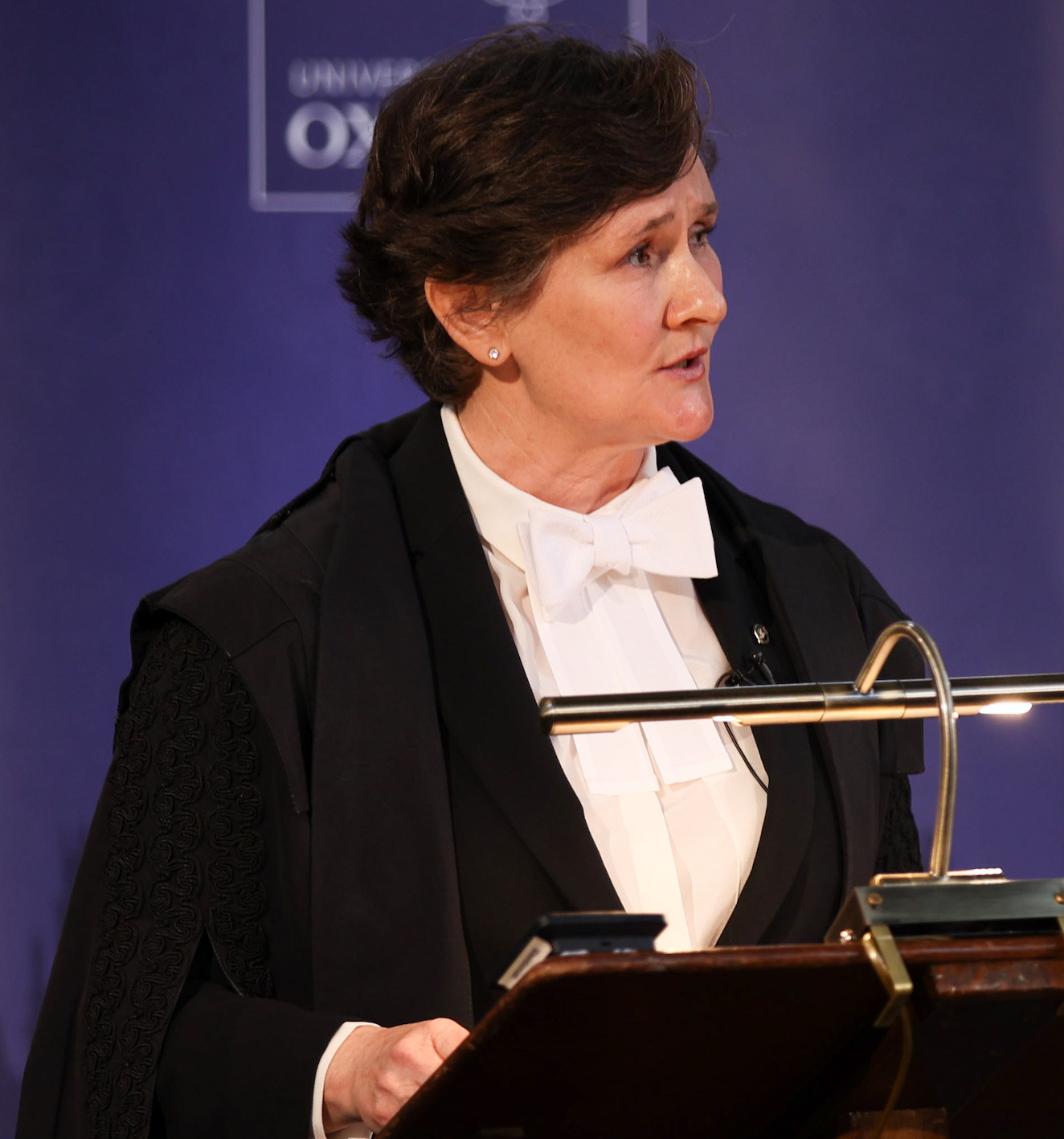
Irene Tracey, vice-chancellor of the University of Oxford and former warden of Merton College, Oxford

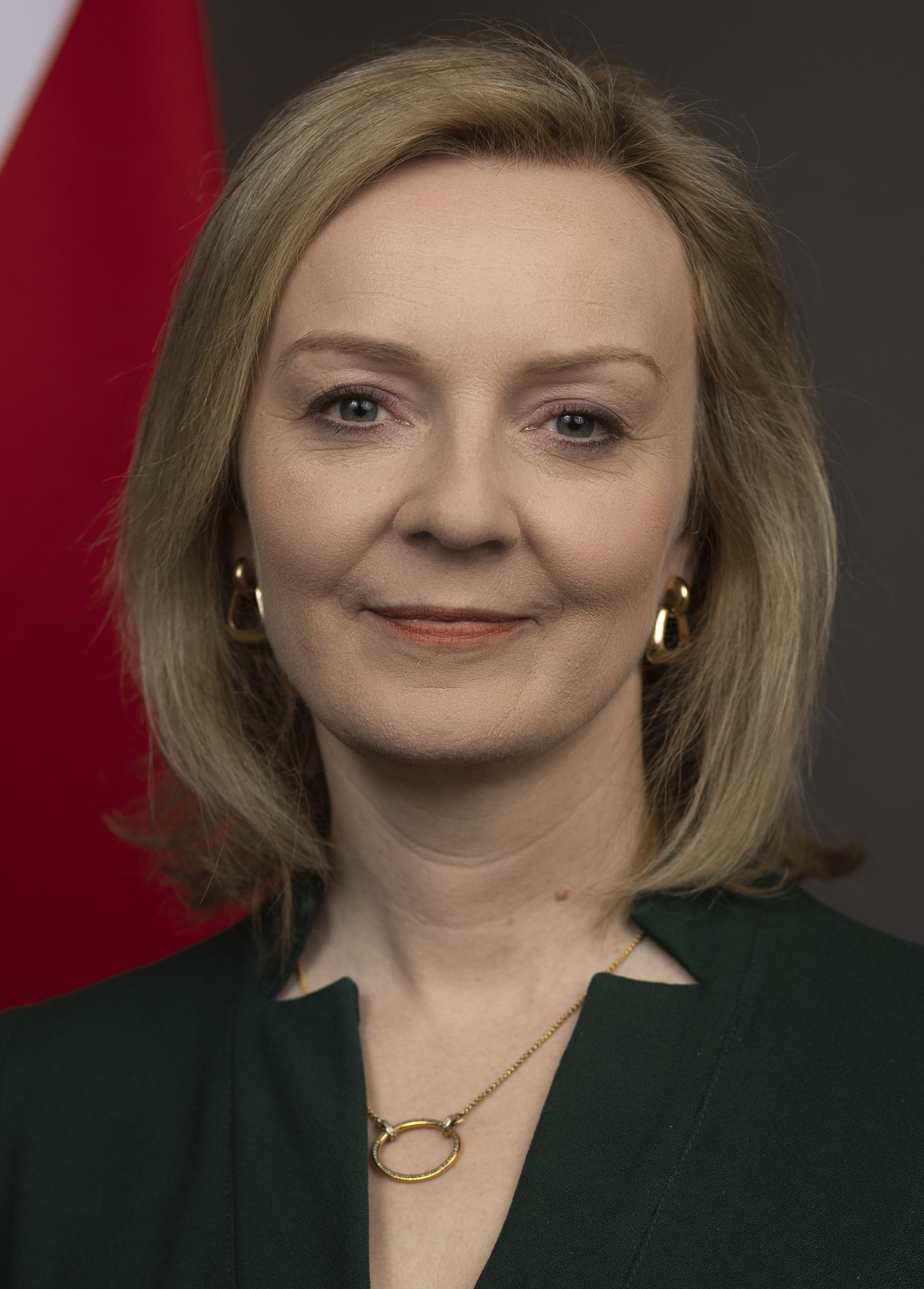
Liz Truss, British politician and former prime minister of the United Kingdom

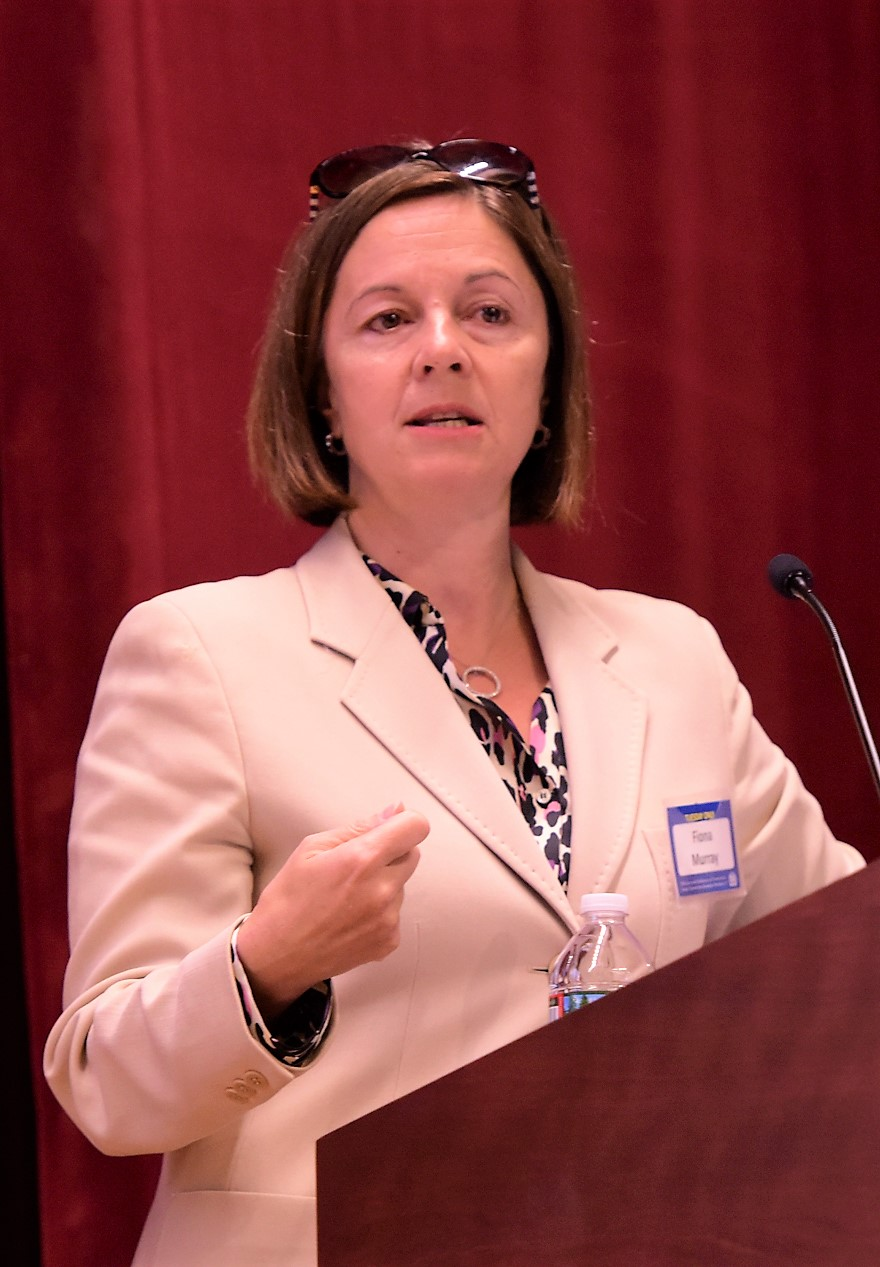
Fiona Murray, associate dean for innovation at the MIT Sloan School of Management

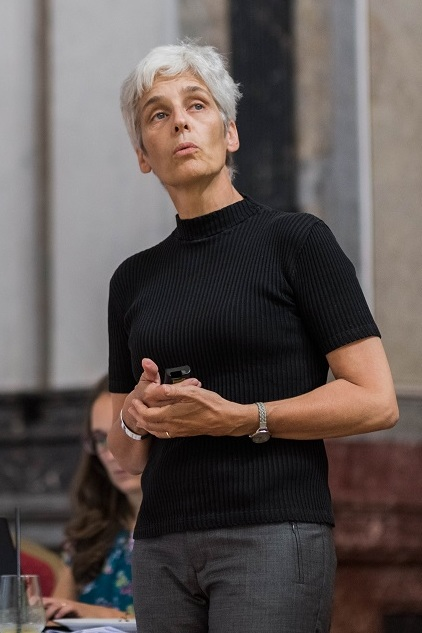
Ulrike Tillmann, mathematician specializing in algebraic topology

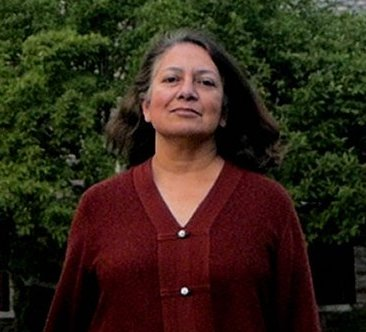
Sunetra Gupta, professor of theoretical epidemiology

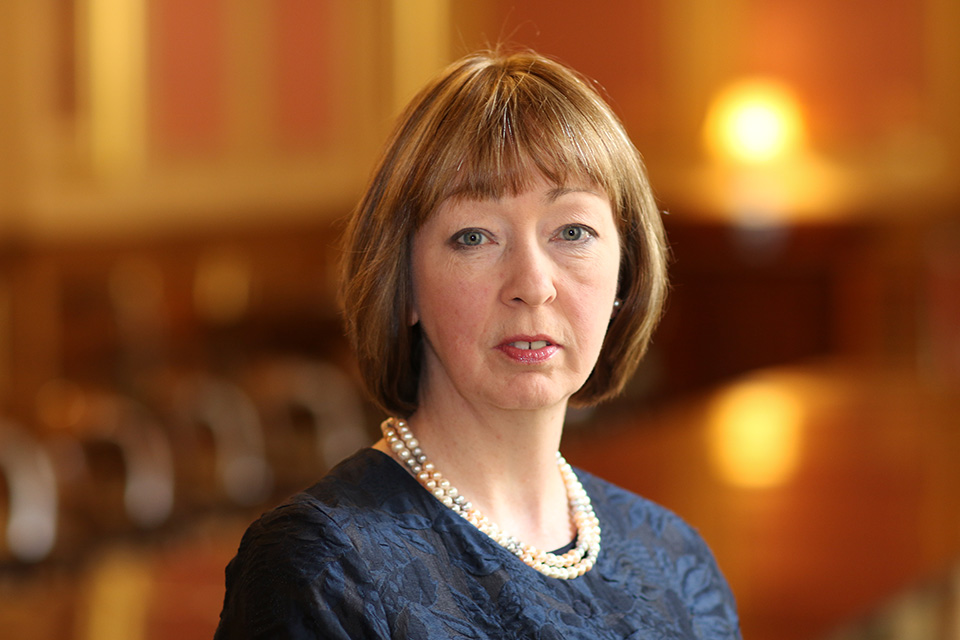
Alison Blake, British diplomat and former ambassador to Afghanistan

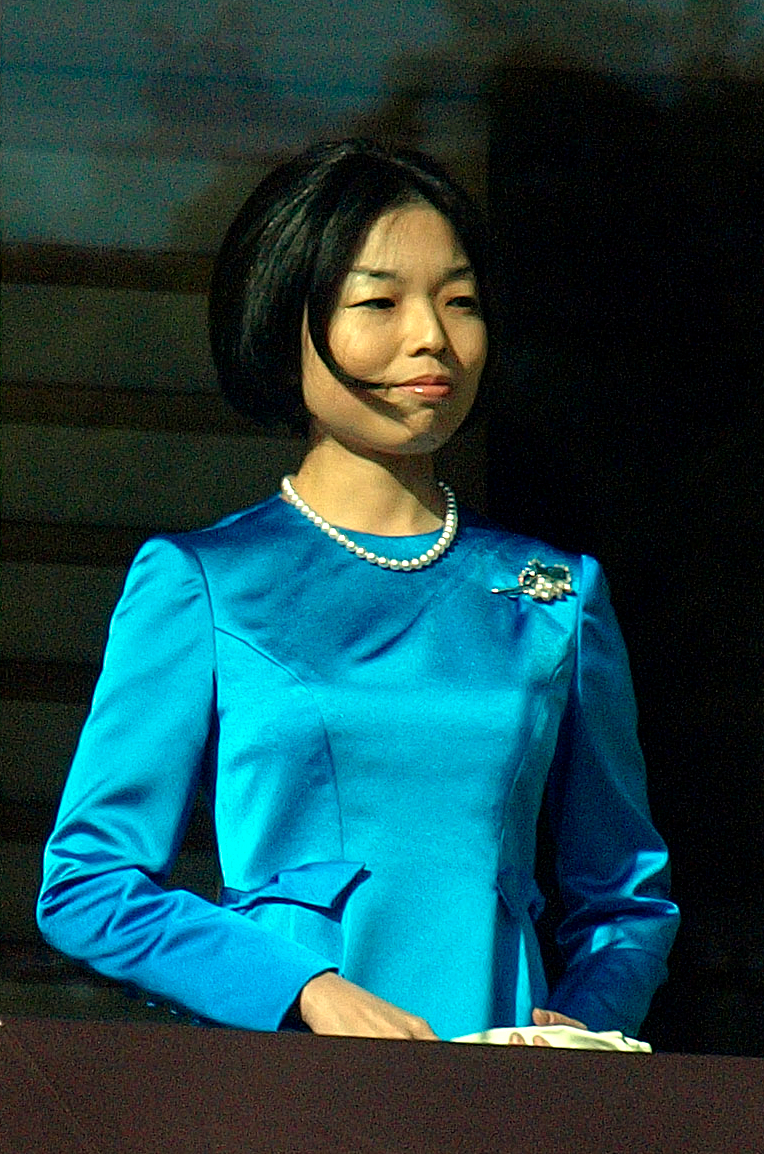
Princess Akiko of Mikasa, member of the Imperial House of Japan
