= Grove Walk =

Footpath in Oxford, England

Coordinates: 51.7506359°N 1.2530241°W

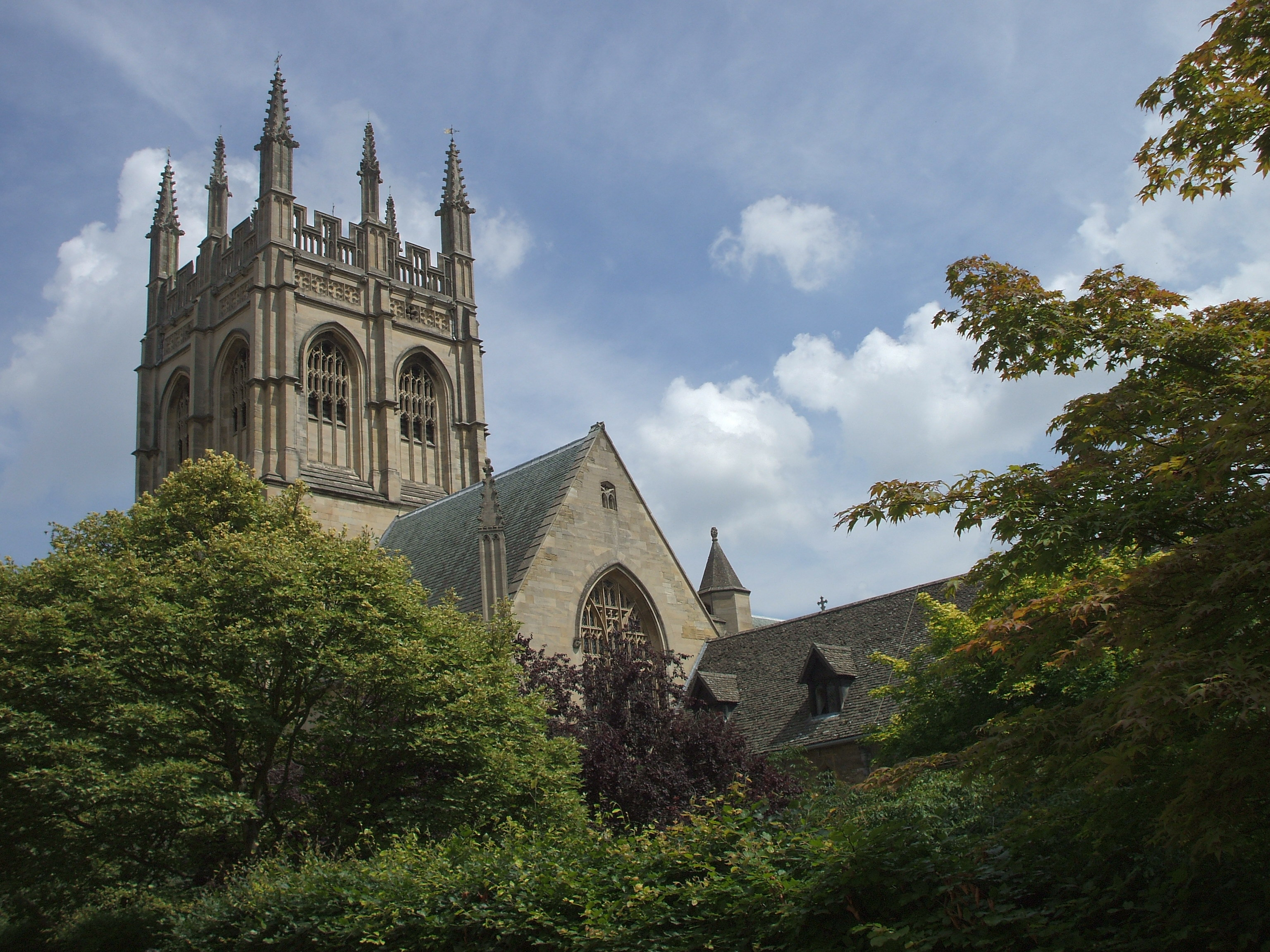
View from Grove Walk of Merton College Chapel Tower.

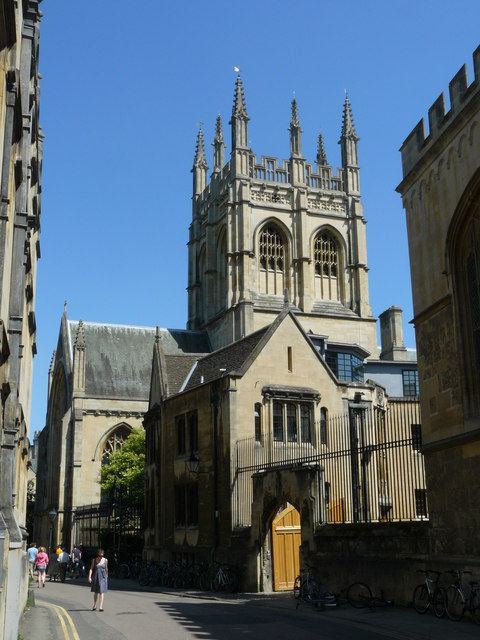
The entrance to Grove Walk on Merton Street next to the tower of Merton College Chapel.

Grove Walk (aka Merton Grove and Grove Passage) is a short historic leafy walkway running north–south in central Oxford, England, situated on land between Merton College to the east and Corpus Christi College to the west. It provides one of the entrances to Christ Church Meadow from the north.

To the north, Grove Walk connects with Merton Street through a gateway surrounded by railings. On the other side of Merton Street, the route continues as the narrow medieval Magpie Lane. To the south it passes through what used to be the Oxford city wall and leads to Dead Man's Walk on Merton Field. Beyond that via Merton Walk to the wide Broad Walk is the main part of Christ Church Meadow.

In 1701, Corpus Christi College attempted to acquire some of this strip of land, but this was resisted.

To the south, the first hot air balloon ascent in Britain was made by James Sadler (1753–1828), when he ascended from Merton Field on 4 October 1783, landing northeast of Oxford in Woodeaton.

An 1864 block separates Grove Walk from the Back Quad at Merton College.

By the late 19th century, Magpie Lane to the north was known as "Grove Street", but in 1927 the name was changed back to Magpie Lane.

The building in the south-western corner of Merton College is also called Grove. The name perhaps derives because this area used to be an orchard.

== Bibliography ==
- Symonds, Ann Spokes; Morgan, Nigel (2010). The Origins of Oxford Street Names. Witney, Oxfordshire: Robert Boyd Publications. ISBN 978-1-899536-99-3.
