= Dead Man's Walk, Oxford =

Footpath in Oxford, England

Coordinates: 51.7507°N 1.2510°W

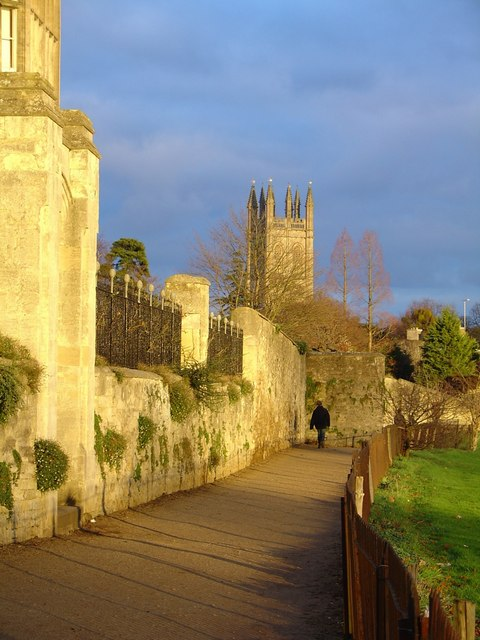
Dead Man's Walk at the northern side of Merton Field with Merton College on the left and Magdalen Tower in the distance.

Dead Man's Walk (or Deadman's Walk) is a footpath running east–west in central Oxford, England, situated immediately to the south of Merton College and just outside the old Oxford city wall, with Corpus Christi College at the western end. To the north, Grove Walk connects with Merton Street through a gateway. Immediately to the south is Merton Field with Merton Walk connecting to the wide tree-lined Broad Walk, which runs parallel with Dead Man's Walk. Beyond that is Christ Church Meadow.

== History ==
The walkway itself appears to be the route of medieval Jewish funeral processions. A procession would begin at the synagogue (near to where Tom Tower now stands) and proceed towards the Jewish burial ground (now the site of the University of Oxford Botanic Garden).

== Historical markers ==
Near to the eastern end of the walkway is a plaque marking the first hot air balloon ascent by an "English Aeronaut", James Sadler (1753–1828). He ascended from Merton Field on 4 October 1784, landing nearby in Woodeaton.

There is a stone slab in the University of Oxford Botanical Garden with a history of the origin of the footpath. It reads:

Beneath this garden lies a medieval cemetery.

Around 1190 the Jews of Oxford purchased a water meadow outside the city walls to establish a burial ground. In 1231 that land, now occupied by Magdalen College, was appropriated by the Hospital of St John, and a small section of wasteland, where this memorial lies, was given to the Jews for a new cemetery.

An ancient footpath linked this cemetery with the medieval Jewish quarter along Great Jewry Street, now St Aldates. For over 800 years this path has been called 'Deadman's Walk,' a name that bears silent witness to a community that contributed to the growth of this City and early University throughout the 12th and 13th centuries.

In 1290 all the Jews were expelled from England by King Edward I. They were not permitted to return for over 350 years.

May their memory be blessed

יהא זכרונם לברכה

== Local legend ==
The walkway is the site of what has been described as one of the most well-known English Civil War hauntings. The ghost of Francis Windebank, a Colonel executed by firing squad in 1645 against the length of town wall that borders Merton College, has been reportedly sighted here as a ghost. He was shot during the Siege of Oxford due to his alleged cowardice under an order by Prince Rupert. The ghost is allegedly only seen from the knees up, due to the raising of the ground level. It has been suggested that reports of a haunting are to be expected here given the evocative name. However, it has been a long time since any new reported sightings have been made.

== See also ==
- Addison's Walk, Oxford
- Mesopotamia Walk, Oxford
