= Merton Field =

Grass Field in central Oxford, England

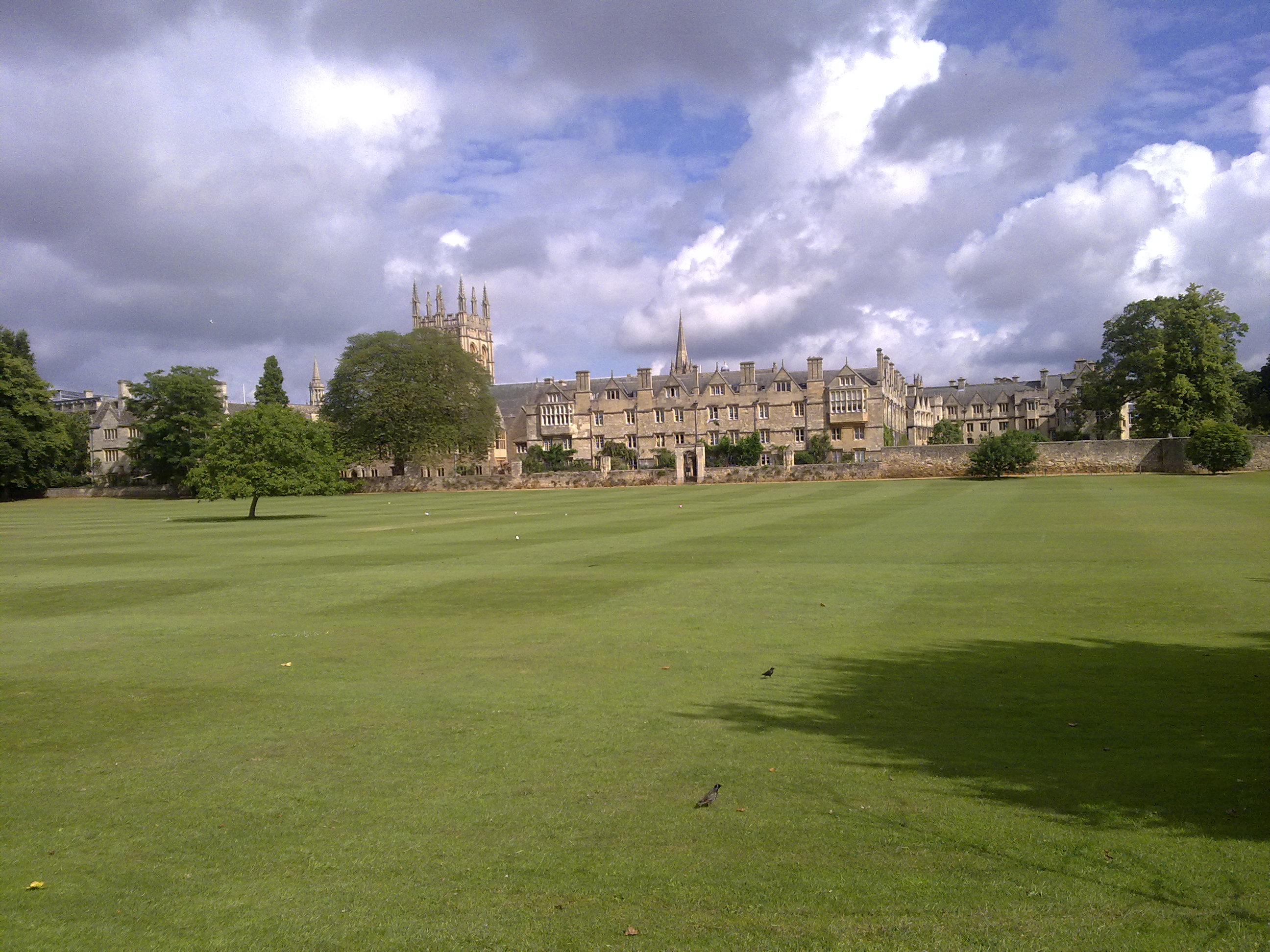
- View north of Merton Field, with Merton College in the distance.
- Interactive map of Merton Field
- Type: Playing field
- Location: Christ Church Meadow, Oxford, England
- Coordinates: 51.7489107°N 1.2524569°W
- Operator: Christ Church Cathedral School
- Status: Open all year

Merton Field is a grass playing field north of the main part of Christ Church Meadow and south of Merton College in central Oxford, England.

To the west are Merton Walk and Christ Church, one of the Oxford colleges. To the east is the University of Oxford Botanic Garden. To the south is Broad Walk a wide path on the northern edge of Christ Church Meadow. To the north, Dead Man's Walk skirts the edge of Merton Field following the line of the old Oxford city wall and Grove Walk leads to Merton Street, between Corpus Christi College and Merton College. The tower of Merton College Chapel dominates the view north from Merton Field.

Near to the eastern end of Dead Man's Walk is a plaque marking the first hot air balloon ascent in Britain, made by James Sadler (1753–1828). He ascended from Merton Field on 4 October 1783, landing in Woodeaton to the northeast of Oxford.

== Gallery ==
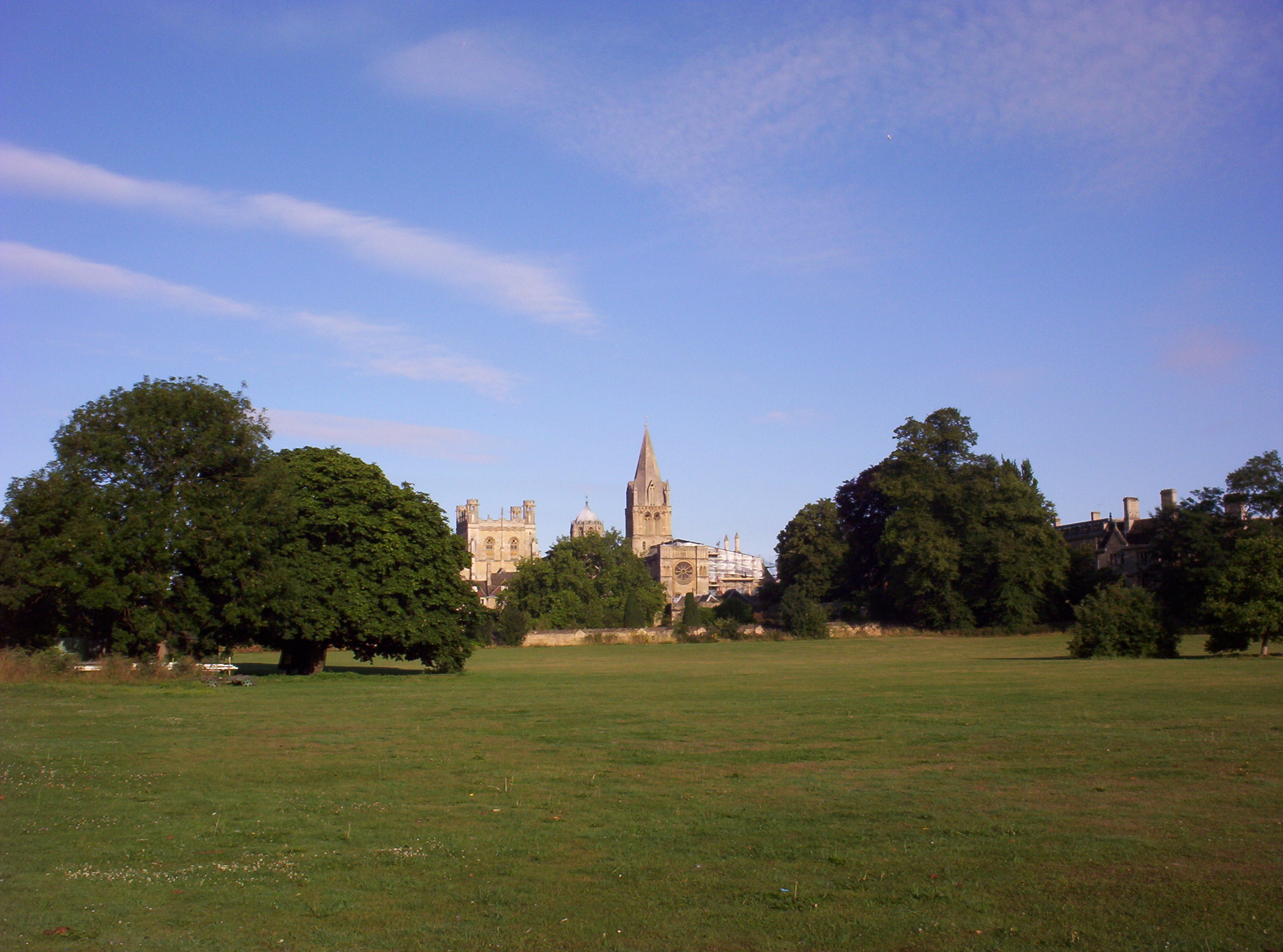
View from the meadow, looking across the Merton Field sports fields towards Christ Church Cathedral.

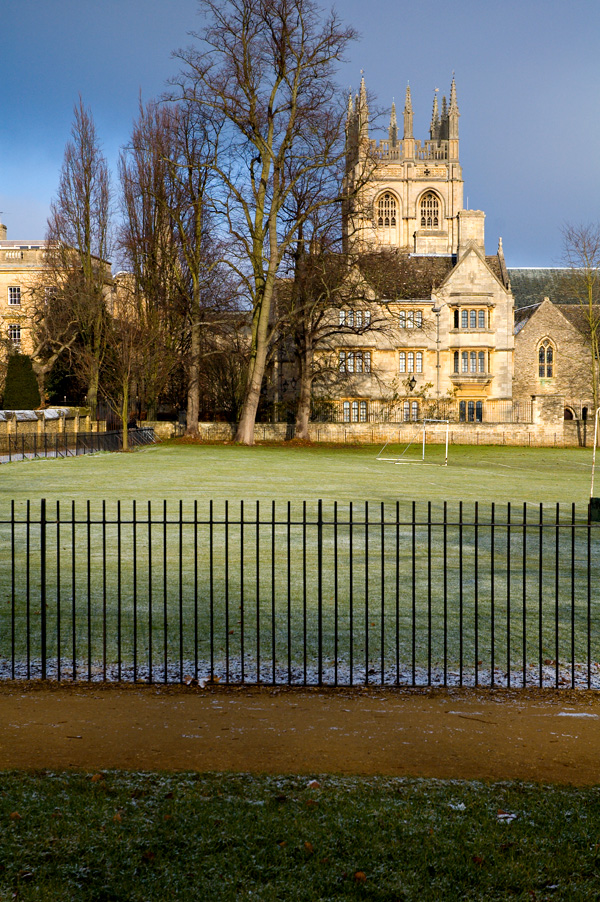
View of Merton Field with Merton College behind, looking north from Broad Walk on the northern edge of Christ Church Meadow.

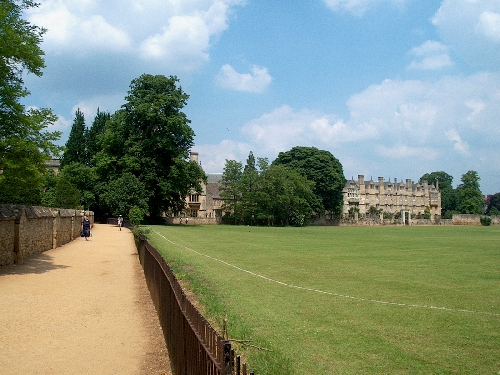
Merton Field, with Merton Walk to the left and Merton College in the distance.

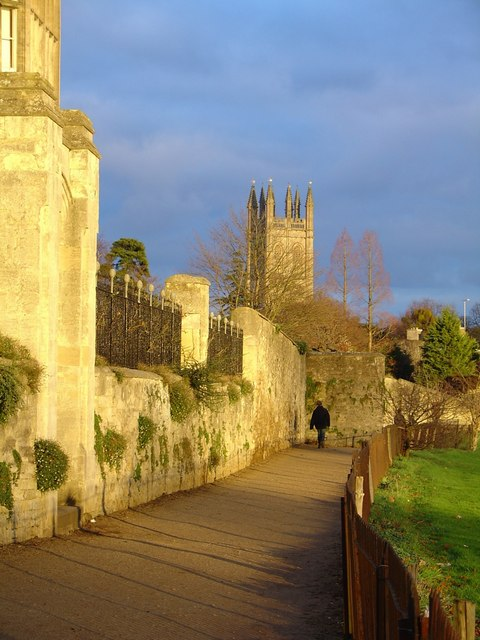
Dead Man's Walk at the northern side of Merton Field with Merton College on the left and Magdalen Tower in the distance.
