= Christ Church War Memorial Garden =

War memorial garden in Oxford, England

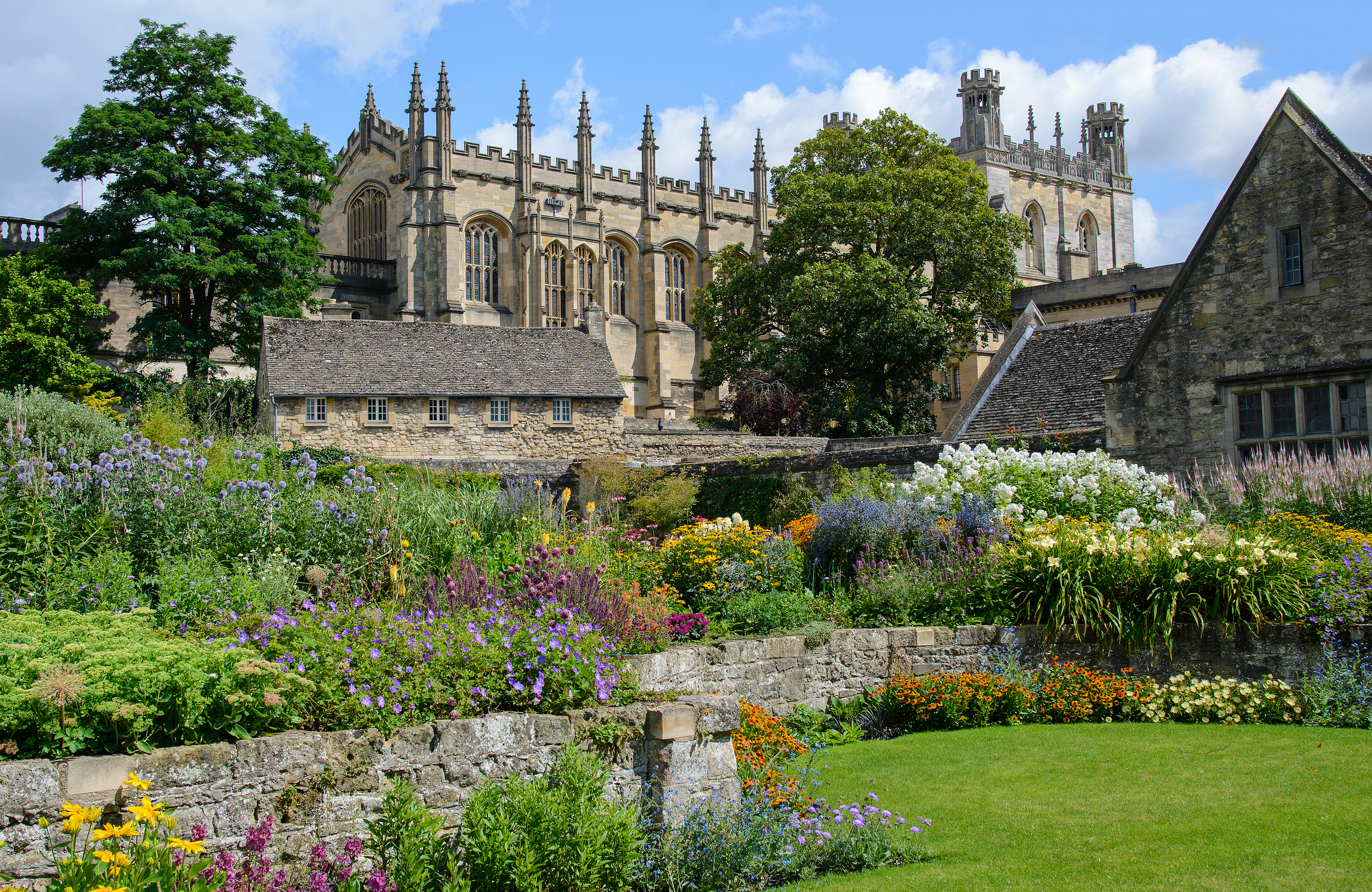
- Interactive map of Christ Church War Memorial Garden
- Location: St Aldate's, Oxfordshire, England
- Coordinates: 51.74910°N 1.25649°W

National Register of Historic Parks and Gardens
- Official name: Christ Church
- Designated: 1 June 1984
- Reference no.: 1000441

Christ Church War Memorial Garden is a garden in Oxford, England, created in 1926 to commemorate the First World War.

The war memorial garden, in memory of members of Christ Church, Oxford, one of the Oxford colleges, is located east off St Aldate's at the western end of Broad Walk, which leads along the northern edge of Christ Church Meadows. To the north is Christ Church with a view of Tom Tower above its main entrance, also on St Aldate's.

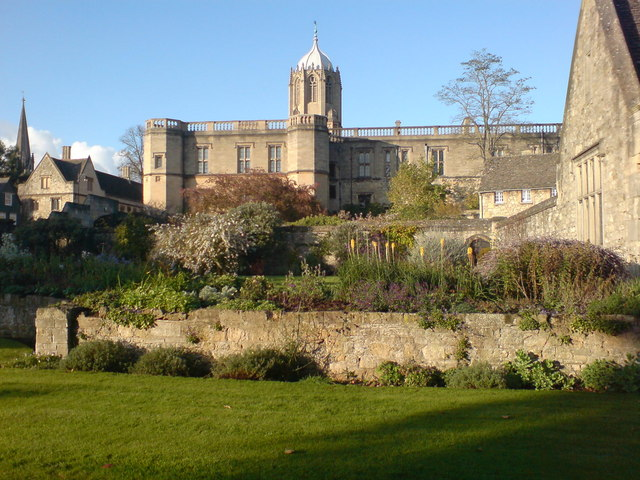
Christ Church War Memorial Garden, looking north from the western end of Broad Walk, with Tom Tower in the background.

There is an inscription in the paving of the path through the garden with a quotation from John Bunyan’s Pilgrim’s Progress.

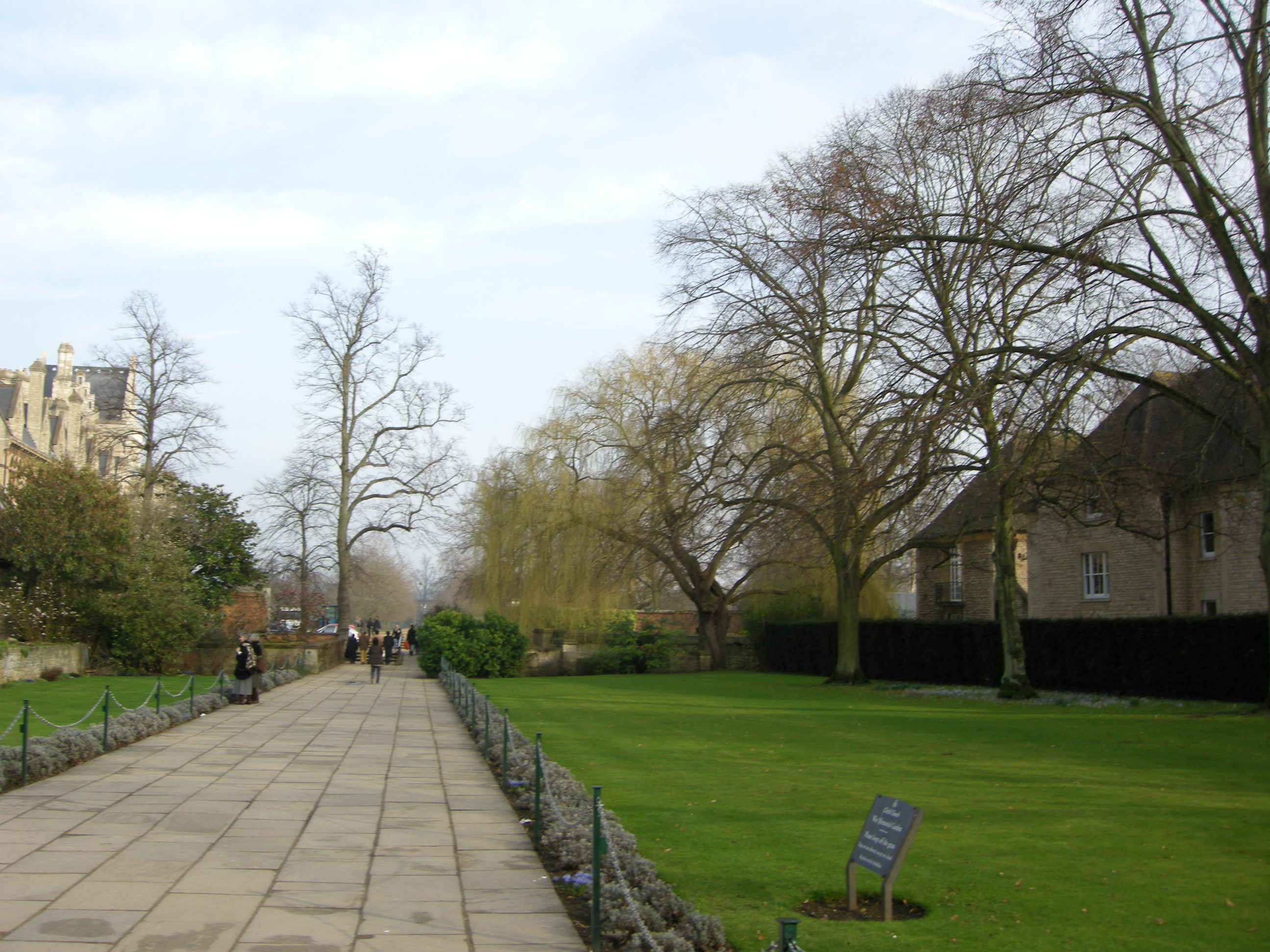
View of the garden looking east along Broad Walk.

Post Second World War development planned for central Oxford included a relief road passing through the northern edge of Christ Church Meadow along the route of Broad Walk and joining the district of St Ebbe's, via the location of the garden. The proposal was defeated after vigorous opposition.

== See also ==
- War memorial
- Oxford Spanish Civil War memorial
