= Mesopotamia, Oxford =

Narrow island that forms part of the University Parks in the English city of Oxford

Mesopotamia
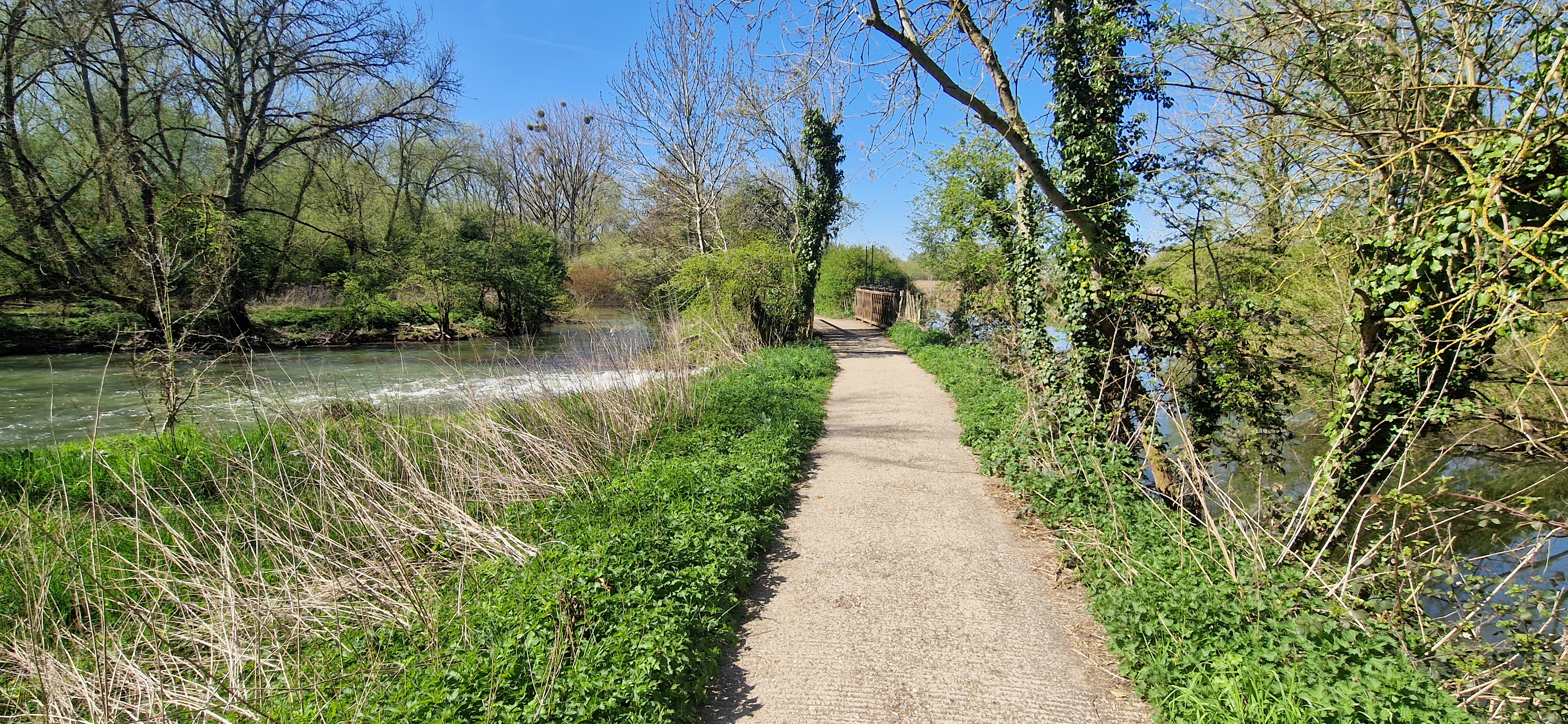
- Looking north along Mesopotamia, with the main river channel to the left and the Kings Mill leat to the right
- Interactive map of Mesopotamia
- Type: Public park on island
- Location: University Parks, Oxford, England
- Coordinates: 51°45′30″N 1°14′29″W
- Owner: University of Oxford

Mesopotamia is a narrow ait, or river island, situated in the River Cherwell within the University Parks in the English city of Oxford. The island extends approximately 800 yards (730 m) in length and 30 yards (27 m) in width. It is positioned between two branches of the Cherwell, which flow at different levels; the higher of these was formerly the mill stream serving Kings Mill. A footpath, Mesopotamia Walk, runs along the island from Parson's Pleasure to Kings Mill, providing part of a pedestrian link between the city centre and Marston Road.

The Domesday Book records the existence of a watermill on the site now occupied by Kings Mill, indicating the site's historical significance since at least the 11th century. The present structure dates from the late 18th century, and milling operations continued there until 1825. The exact date of construction of the mill stream — which led to the formation of Mesopotamia — is unknown. The mill building is constructed of rubble stone with dressed quoins, and comprises two storeys and an attic. Now a Grade II listed structure, it has been converted into a private residence. Although the mill wheel is no longer extant, sluices remain visible in the former mill race.

The island was purchased by the University of Oxford during the expansion of the Oxford University Parks between 1860 and 1865. Mesopotamia Walk was laid out in 1865; the name Mesopotamia is derived from the Greek for "between rivers", a reference shared with the historic region located between the Tigris and Euphrates rivers in present-day Iraq. Until 1926, a ferry operated from a point halfway along the walk, when it was replaced by a footbridge.

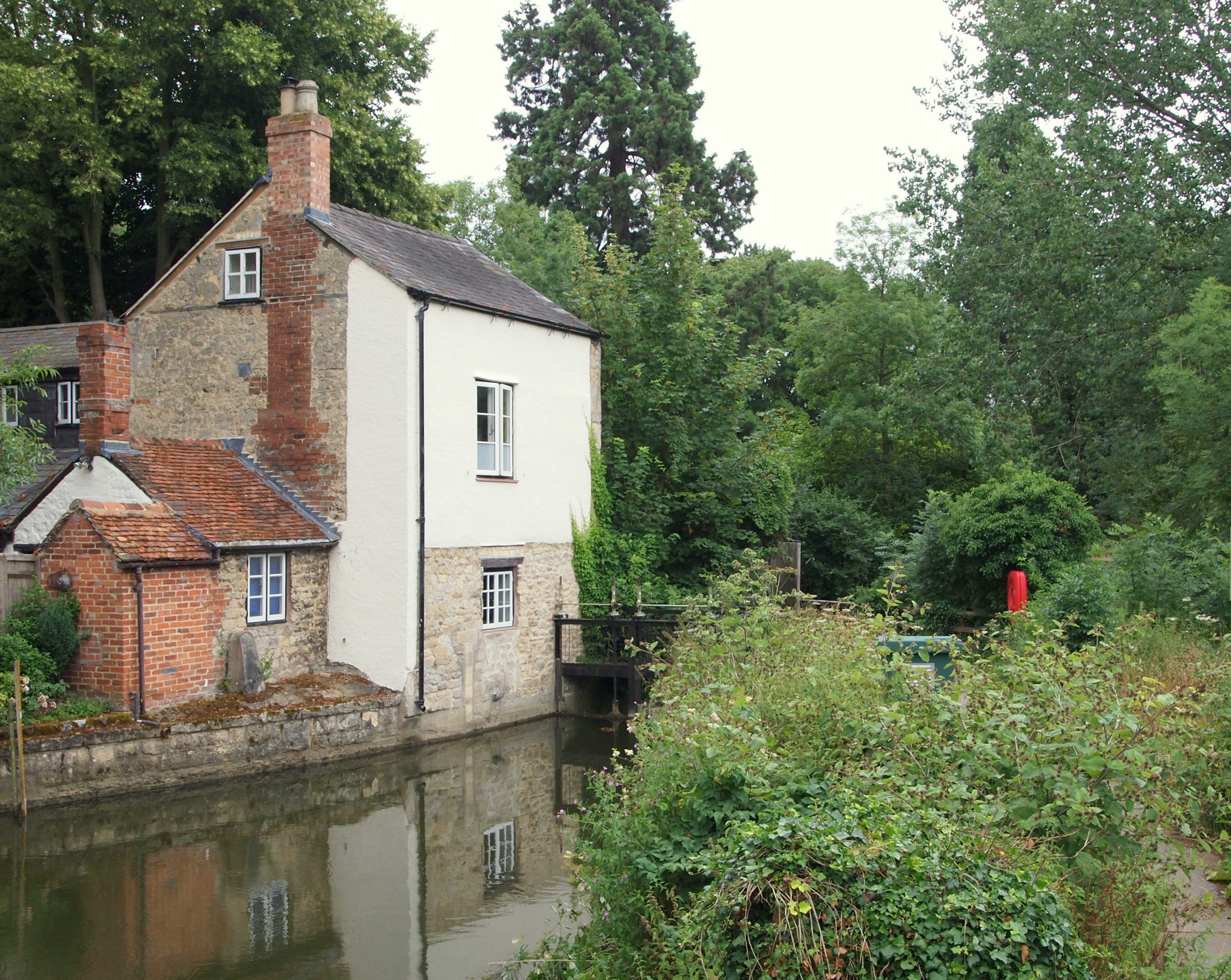
Kings Mill, viewed from the downsteam end of Mesopotamia

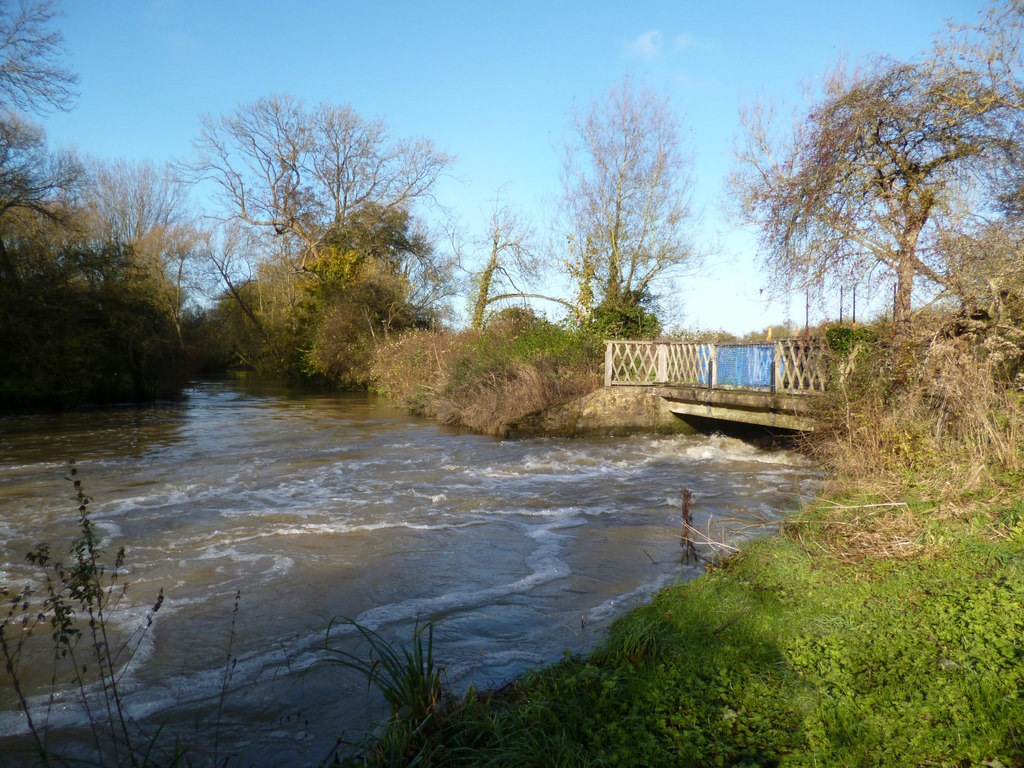
One of two overflow weirs that pass under bridges along the island

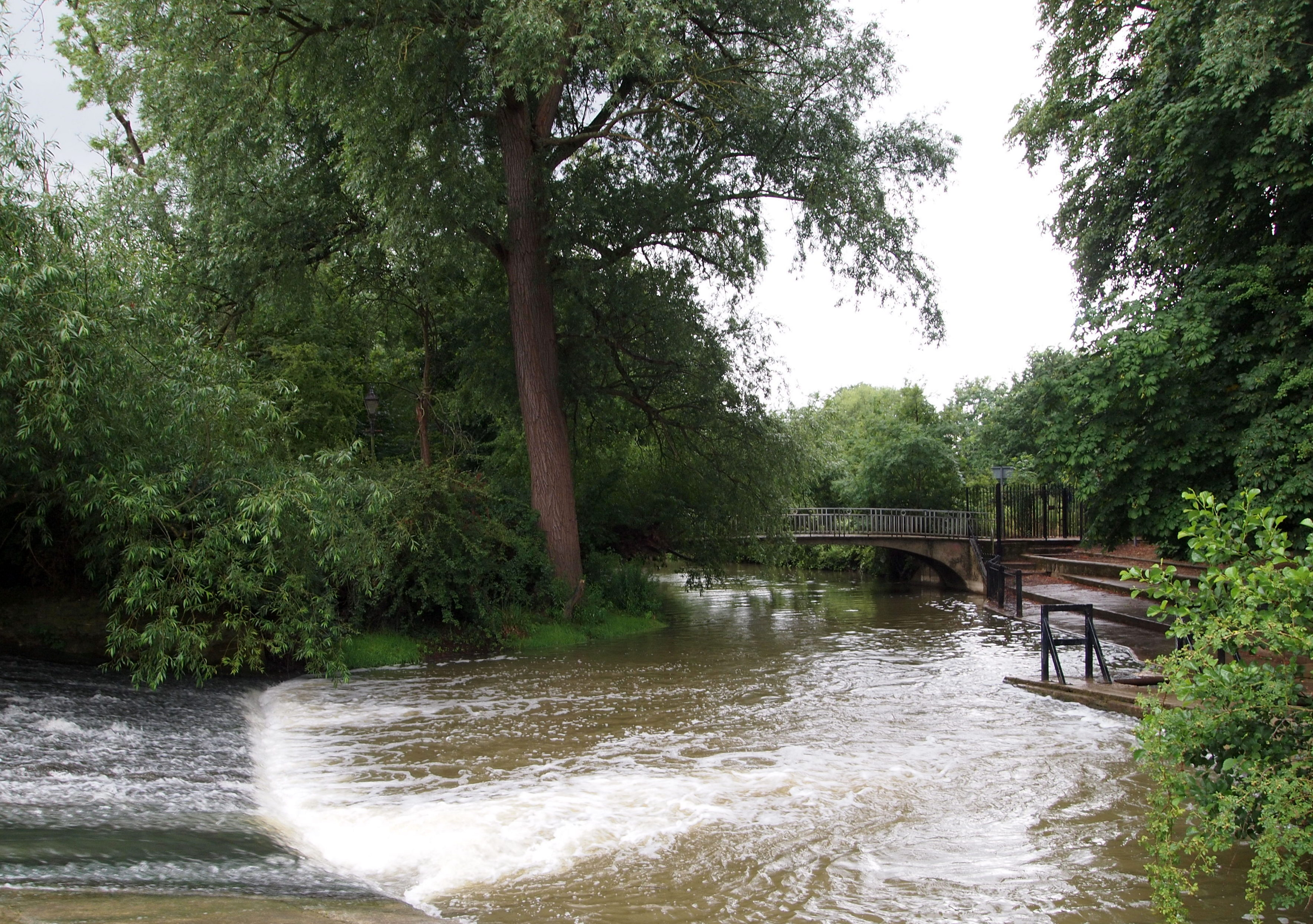
The upstream end of Mesopotamia seen from Parson's Pleasure

== See also ==
- Addison's Walk, Oxford
- Dead Man's Walk, Oxford
