= Broad Walk =

Walkway in Oxford, England

Coordinates: 51.7492°N 1.2522°W

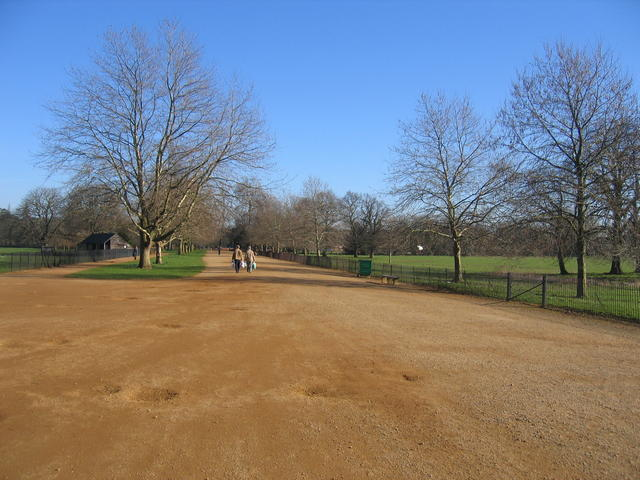
View east along Broad Walk from near the Meadow Building

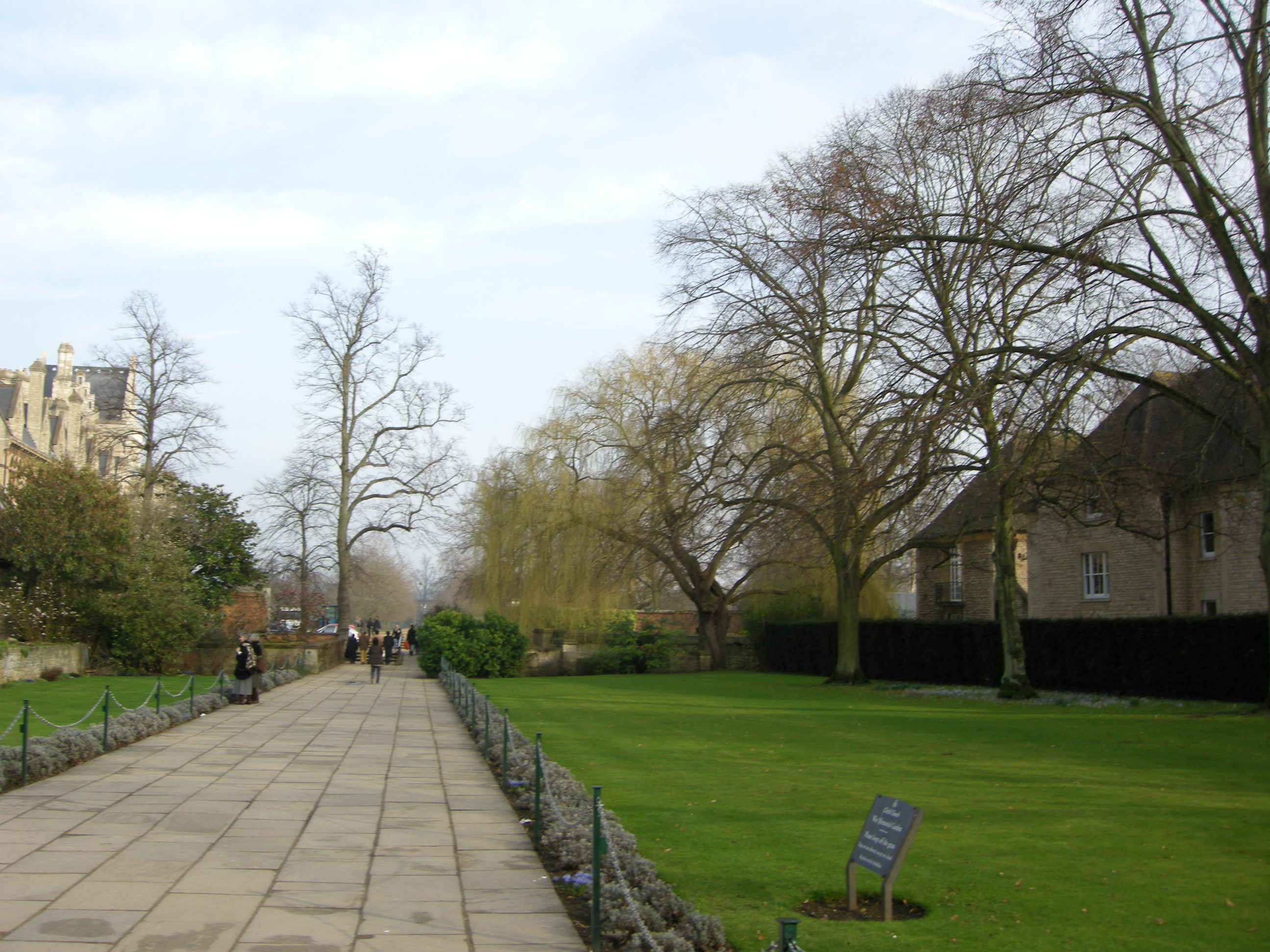
View east along Broad Walk from the Christ Church War Memorial Garden near St Aldate's at the western end

Broad Walk is a wide walkway running east–west on the north side of Christ Church Meadow and south of Merton Field in central Oxford, England.

The walkway runs between St Aldate's though the Christ Church War Memorial Garden at the western end and the River Cherwell to the east at the southern end of the University of Oxford Botanic Garden. To the north, at the western end is Christ Church, one of the Oxford colleges. The tower of Merton College Chapel dominates the view north from Broad Walk across Merton Field, beyond Dead Man's Walk and the old Oxford city wall which runs parallel to Broad Walk, connected via Merton Walk.

Broad Walk used to be lined with large elm trees, but has been denuded due to Dutch elm disease.

The Meadow Building of Christ Church, in an imposing stone-faced Venetian Gothic style, is immediately to the north of Broad Walk. Opposite to the south, the tree-lined Poplar Walk, laid out in 1872 by Henry Liddell, Dean of Christ Church, leads down to the River Thames.

Views of some of the spires and towers of Oxford include (west to east) Tom Tower, the spire of Christ Church Cathedral, Merton College Chapel Tower, and Magdalen Tower.

The first hot air balloon ascent in Britain was made by James Sadler (1753–1828) from Merton Field on 4 October 1783, to the north of Broad Walk.

Postwar development planned for central Oxford included a relief road passing through the Christ Church Meadow along the route of Broad Walk and joining the district of St Ebbe's. The proposal was defeated after strong opposition.

== Gallery ==
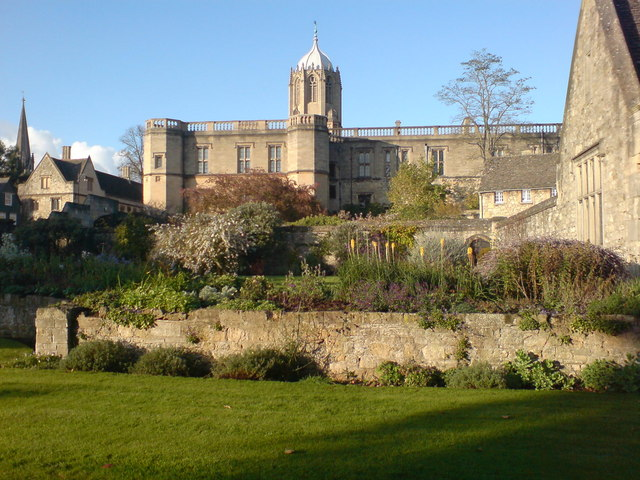
Christ Church War Memorial Garden, looking north from the western end of Broad Walk, with Tom Tower in the background

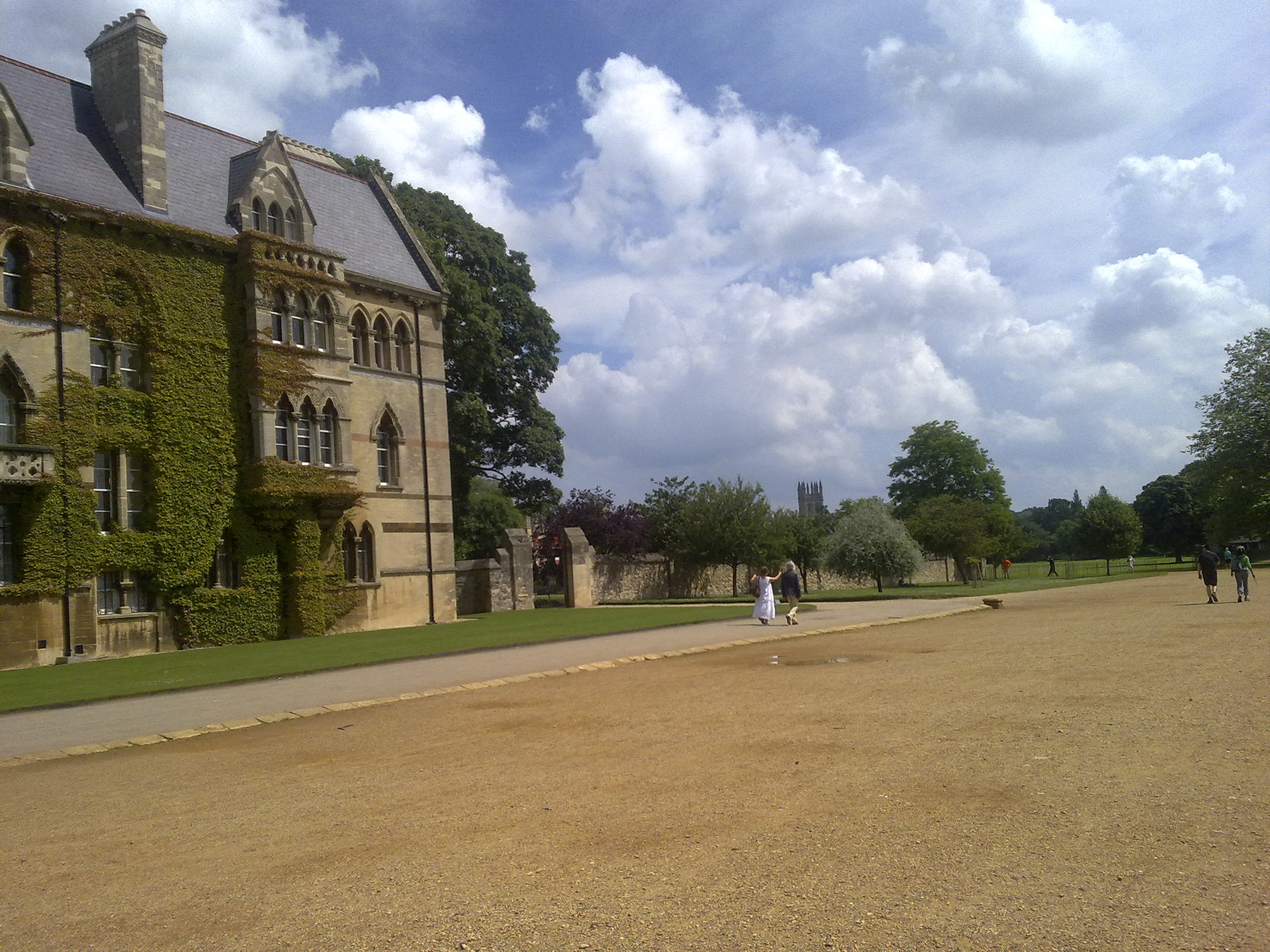
Broad Walk at The Meadow Building on the far northwestern corner of the Christ Church Meadow

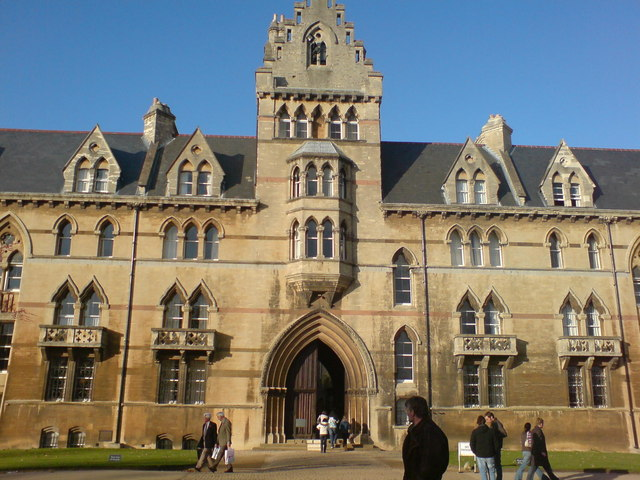
The Meadow Building viewed looking north from Broad Walk

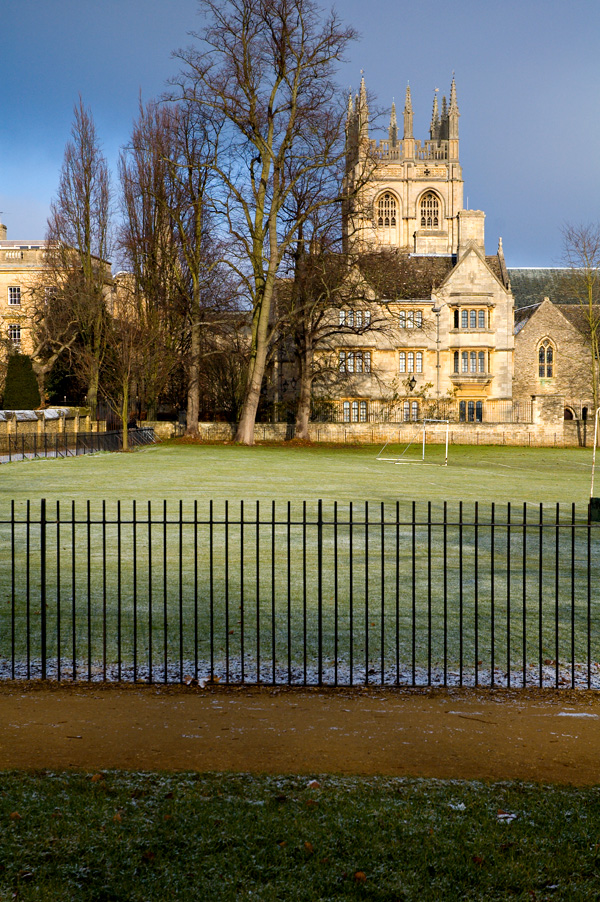
View north from Broad Walk of Merton College with the tower of Merton College Chapel, looking across Merton Field

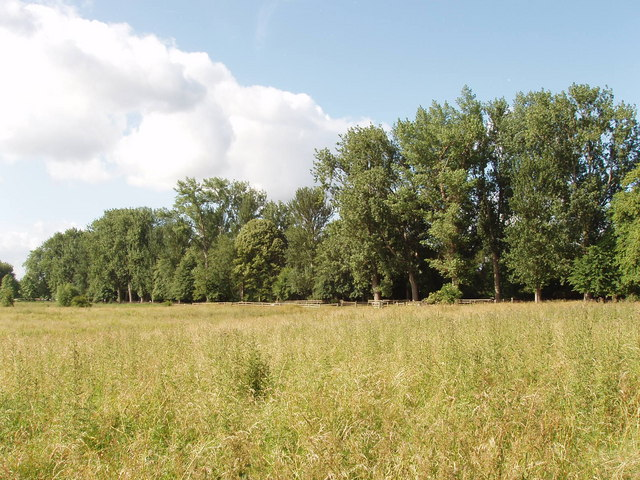
Christ Church Meadow viewed looking south from Broad Walk
