= Christ Church Meadow =

Flood-meadow in Oxford, England

Coordinates: 51°44′51″N 1°15′09″W

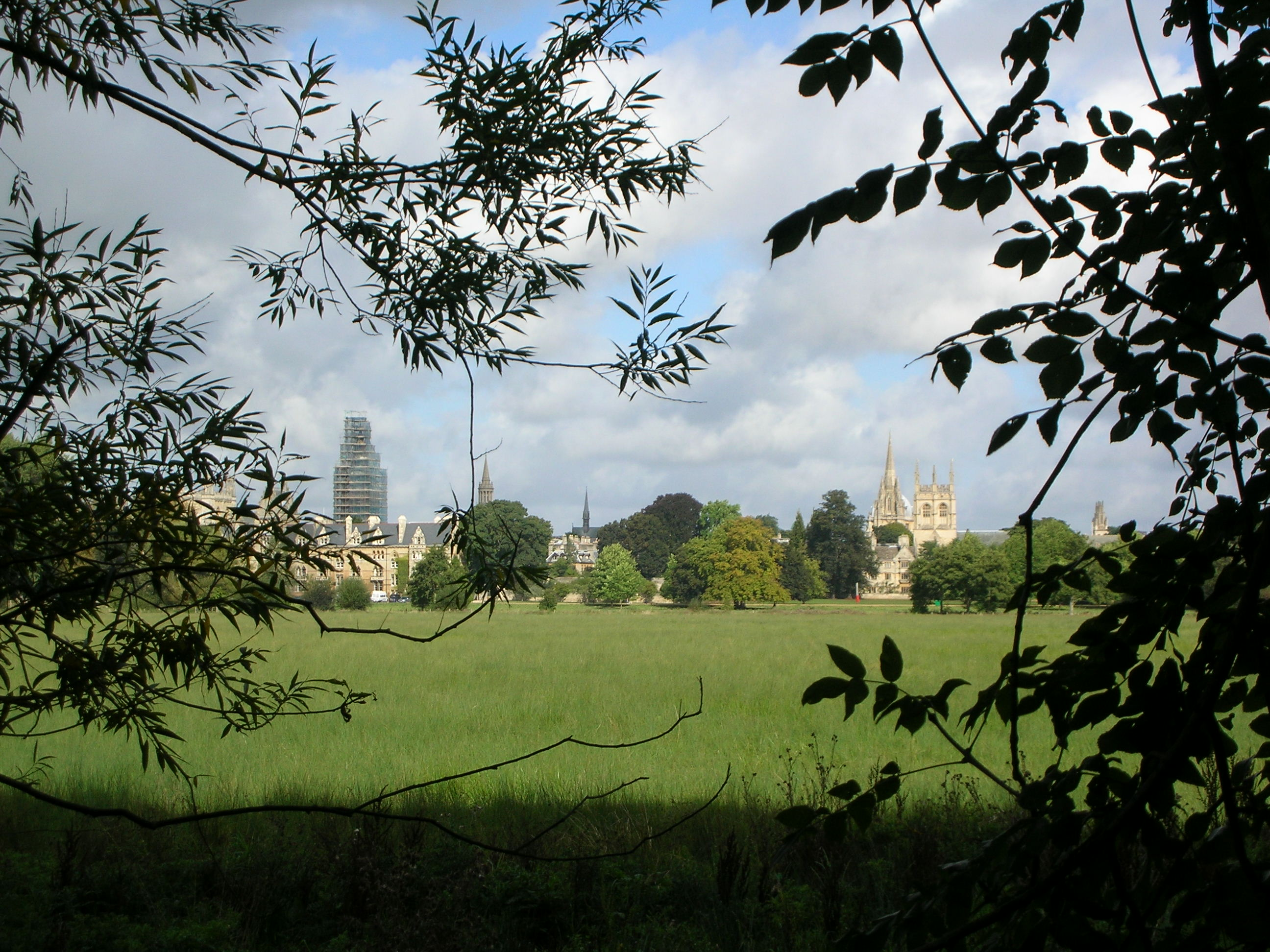
View from the path by the River Cherwell across to Christ Church

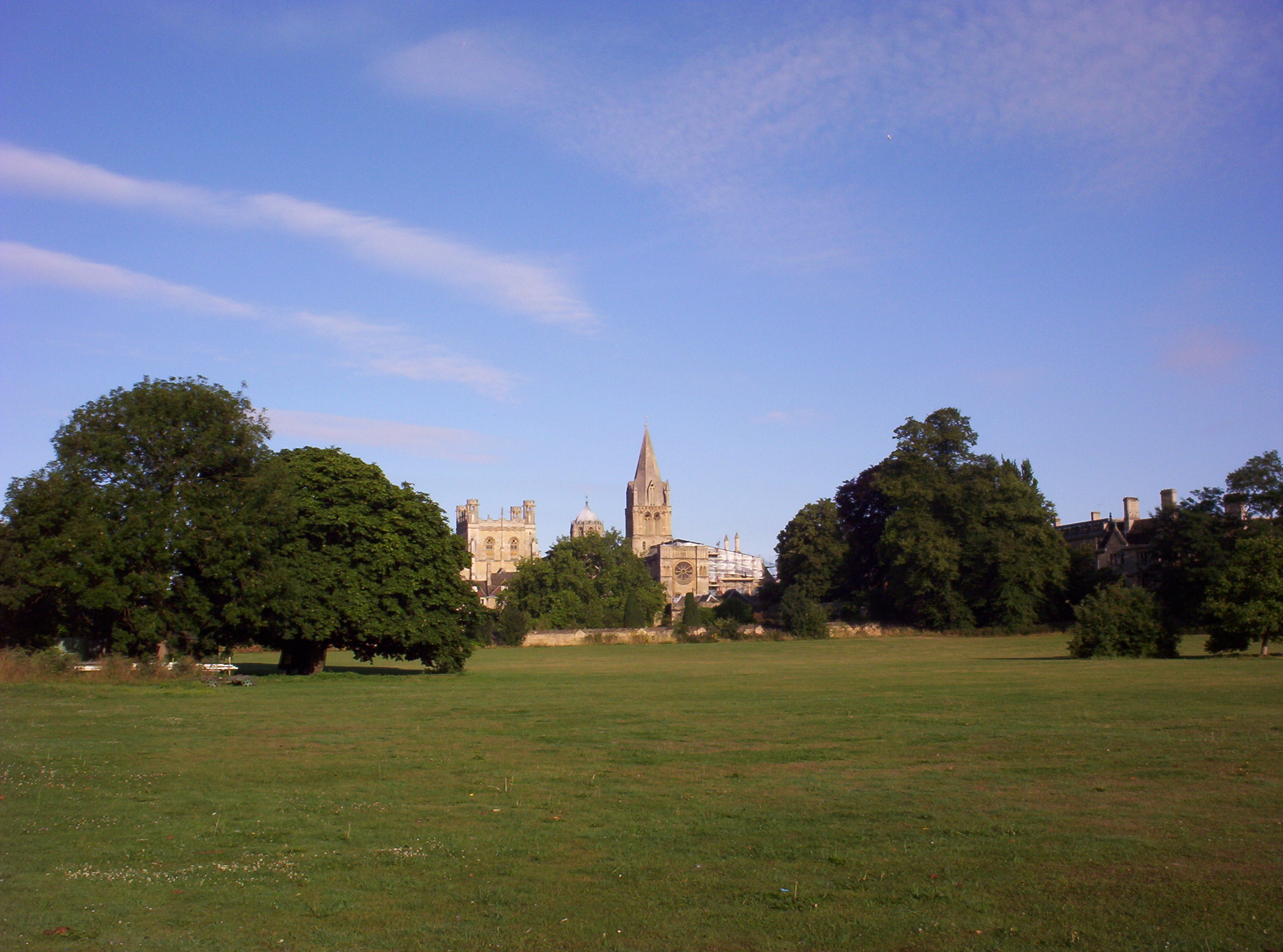
View from the meadow, looking across the Merton Field sports fields towards Christ Church Cathedral

Christ Church Meadow is a flood-meadow and popular walking and picnic spot in Oxford, England.

Roughly triangular in shape, it is bounded by the River Thames (the stretch through Oxford being known as "The Isis"), the River Cherwell, and Christ Church. The meadow provides access to many of the college boathouses, which are on an island at the confluence of the two rivers. The lower sections of the meadow, close to the Thames, are grazed by cattle (including Longhorn cows) while the upper sections have sports fields. Broad Walk is at the northern edge with Merton Field to the north and Merton College, dominated by the tower of Merton College Chapel, beyond that.

Map showing the northern part of Christ Church Meadow, which continues down to the River Isis

Christ Church Meadow is owned by Christ Church, and is thus the private property of the college; however, access is allowed during the day. Access starts very early to allow rowers to go to the boathouses. Eights Week and Torpids, Oxford University's two main rowing events, and Christ Church Regatta are held on the Thames here. In past times, ornamental wooden barges were moored on the river here to store boats and house spectators. However, these have all now been replaced by boathouses.

The meadow can be accessed from St Aldate's to the northwest via Broad Walk through the Christ Church War Memorial Garden, from the north in Merton Street via Grove Walk and Merton Walk, and from the eastern end of the High Street via Rose Lane near the Oxford Botanic Garden to the northeast. There is also less-used access from near the Head of the River public house by Folly Bridge on the River Thames to the southwest, connecting to Poplar Walk (created by Henry Liddell in 1872) and the path by the river. All entrances are via railinged gates that are locked at night.

James Sadler made the first ascent in a balloon by an Englishman from the Meadow on 4 October 1784. The balloon rose to a height of around 3,600 feet (1,100 m) and landed six miles (10 km) away near the village of Wood Eaton near Islip to the northeast of Oxford. A plaque notes the event. The Meadow was also the location where the medieval royal pretender John Deydras claimed to have been persuaded by the devil to impersonate Edward II in 1318.

Postwar development planned for central Oxford included a relief road passing through the meadow and joining the district of St Ebbe's. The proposal was finally defeated in 1971 after vigorous opposition.

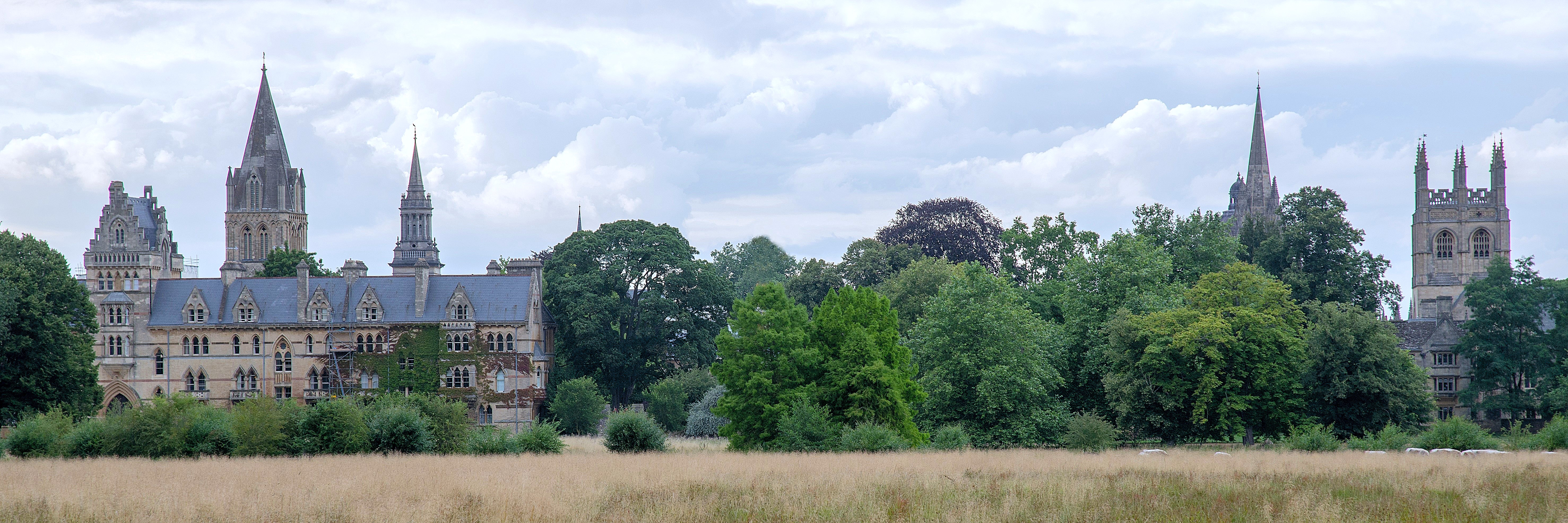
Oxford skyline seen from Christ Church Meadow

== Gallery ==
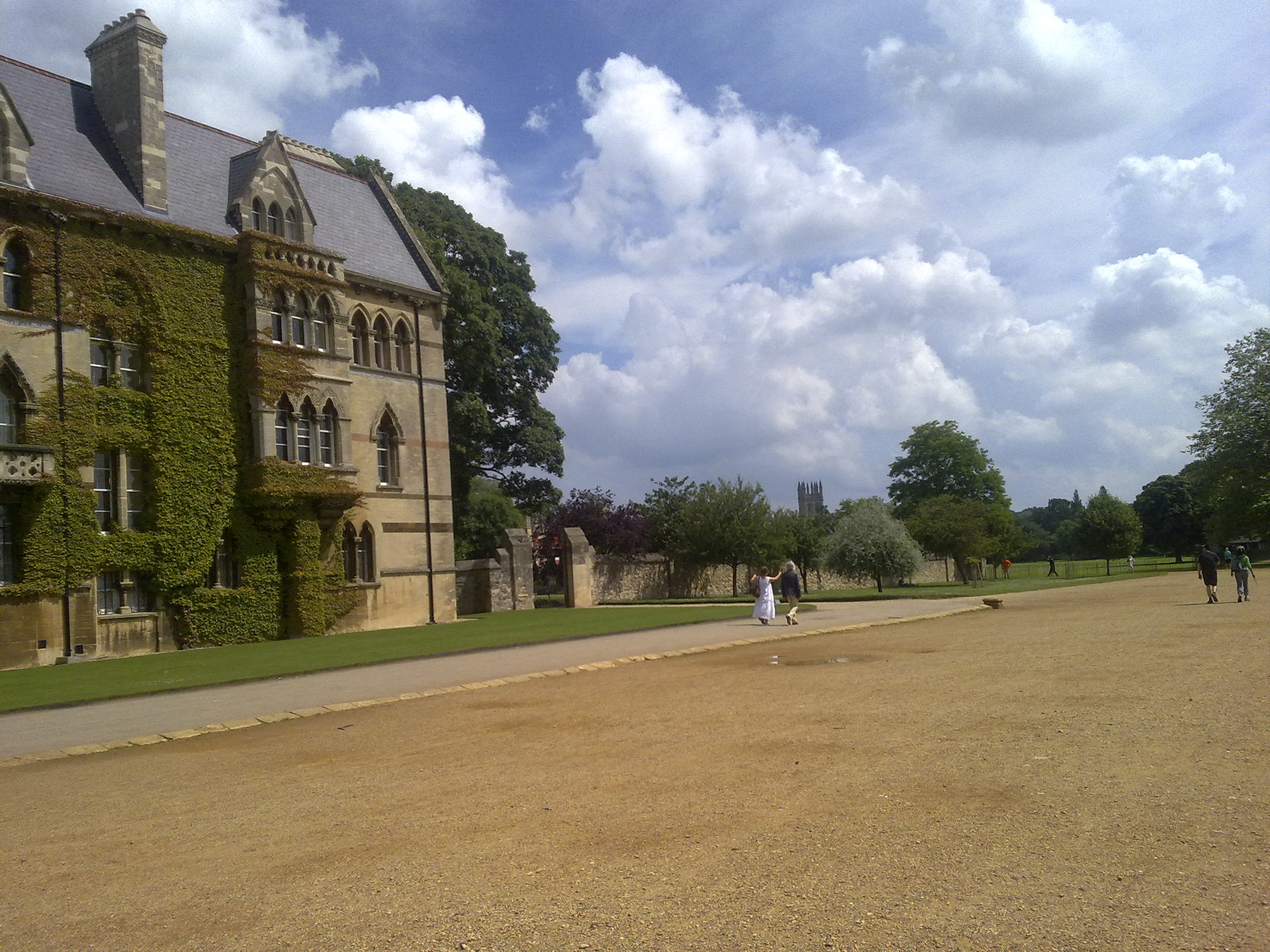
The Meadow Building of Christ Church as seen from Broad Walk on the far northwestern corner of the Christ Church Meadow

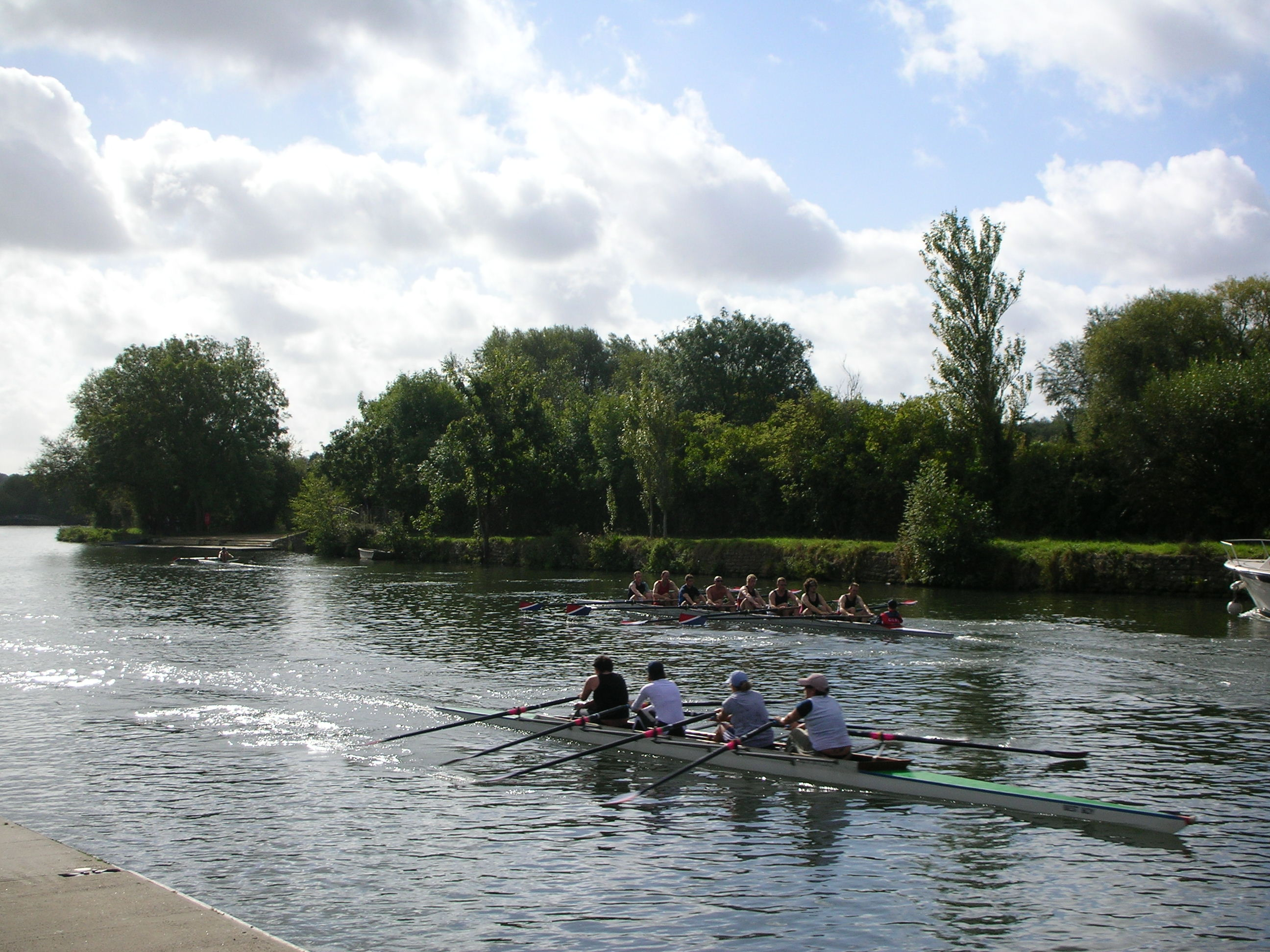
Rowing on the Isis at Christ Church Meadow

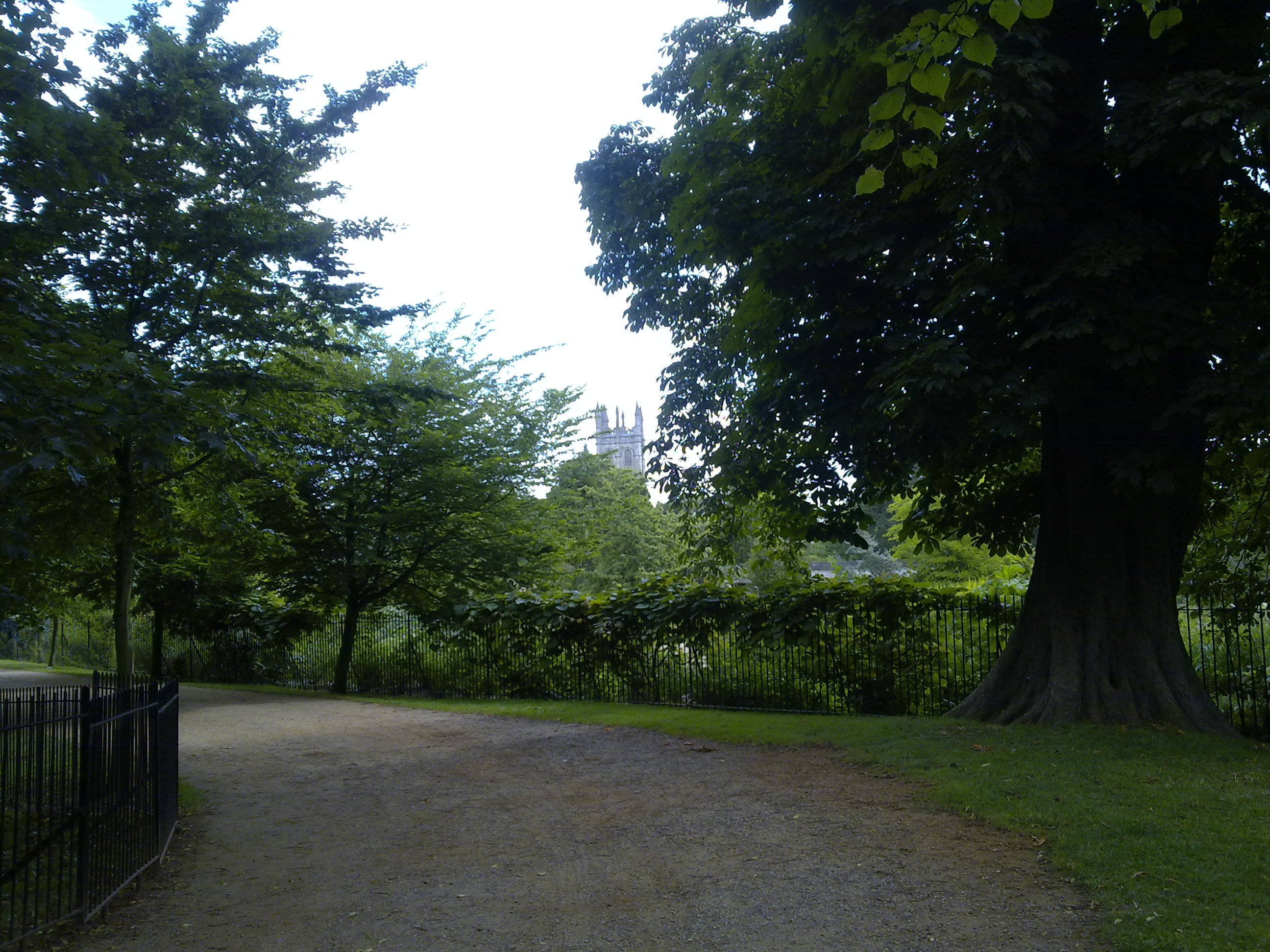
A view of the Great Tower, Magdalen College, from the north eastern edge of the Christ Church Meadow, near its border with the Oxford Botanic Garden

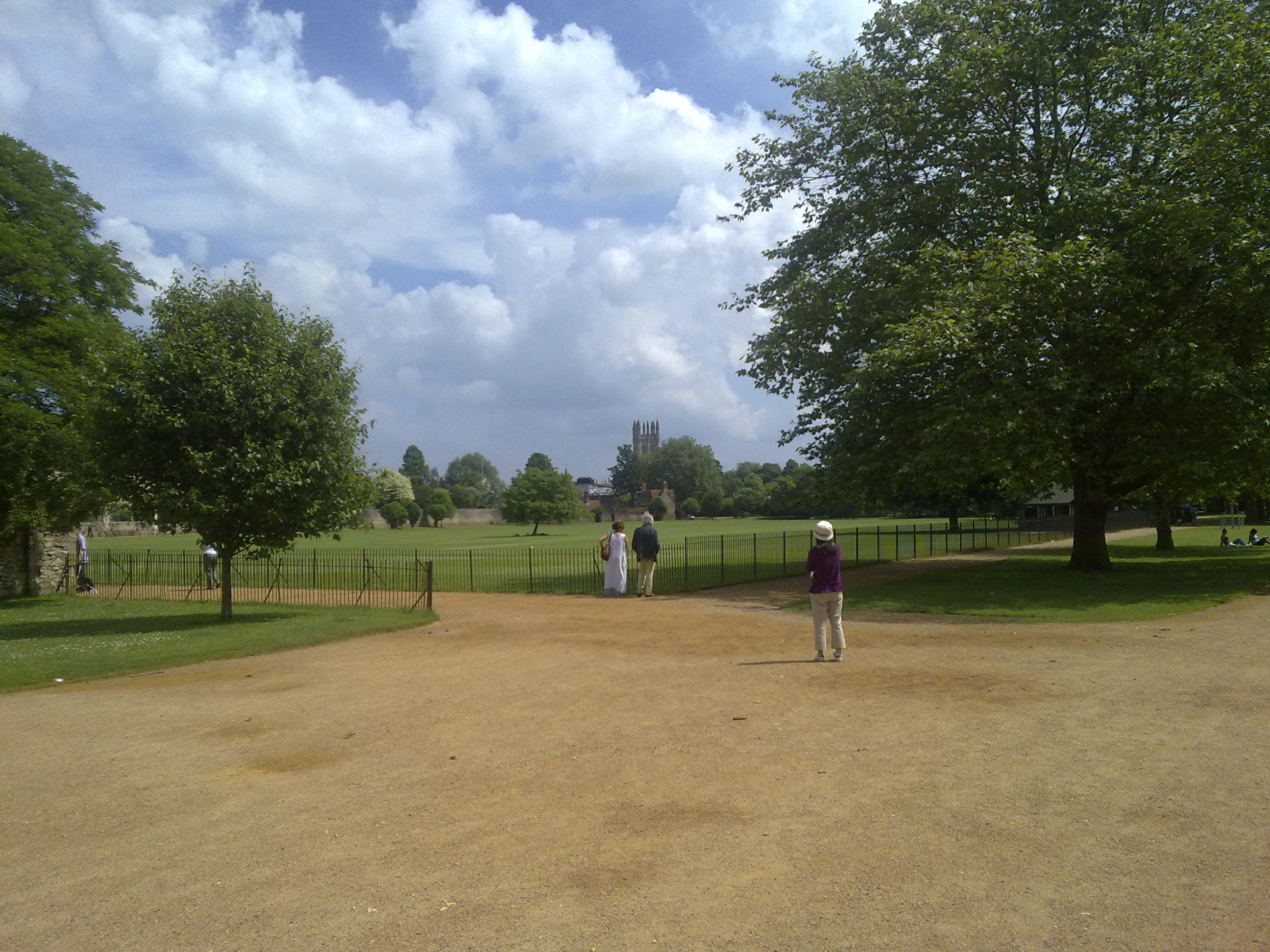
A view from the Christ Church Meadow looking north east towards the Great Tower of Magdalen College

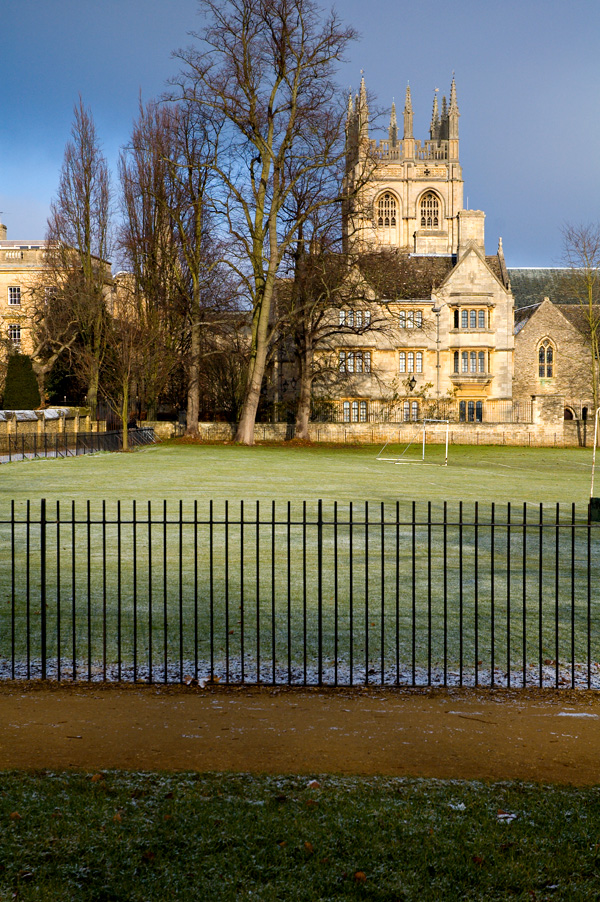
View north of Merton College from Christ Church Meadow across Merton Field

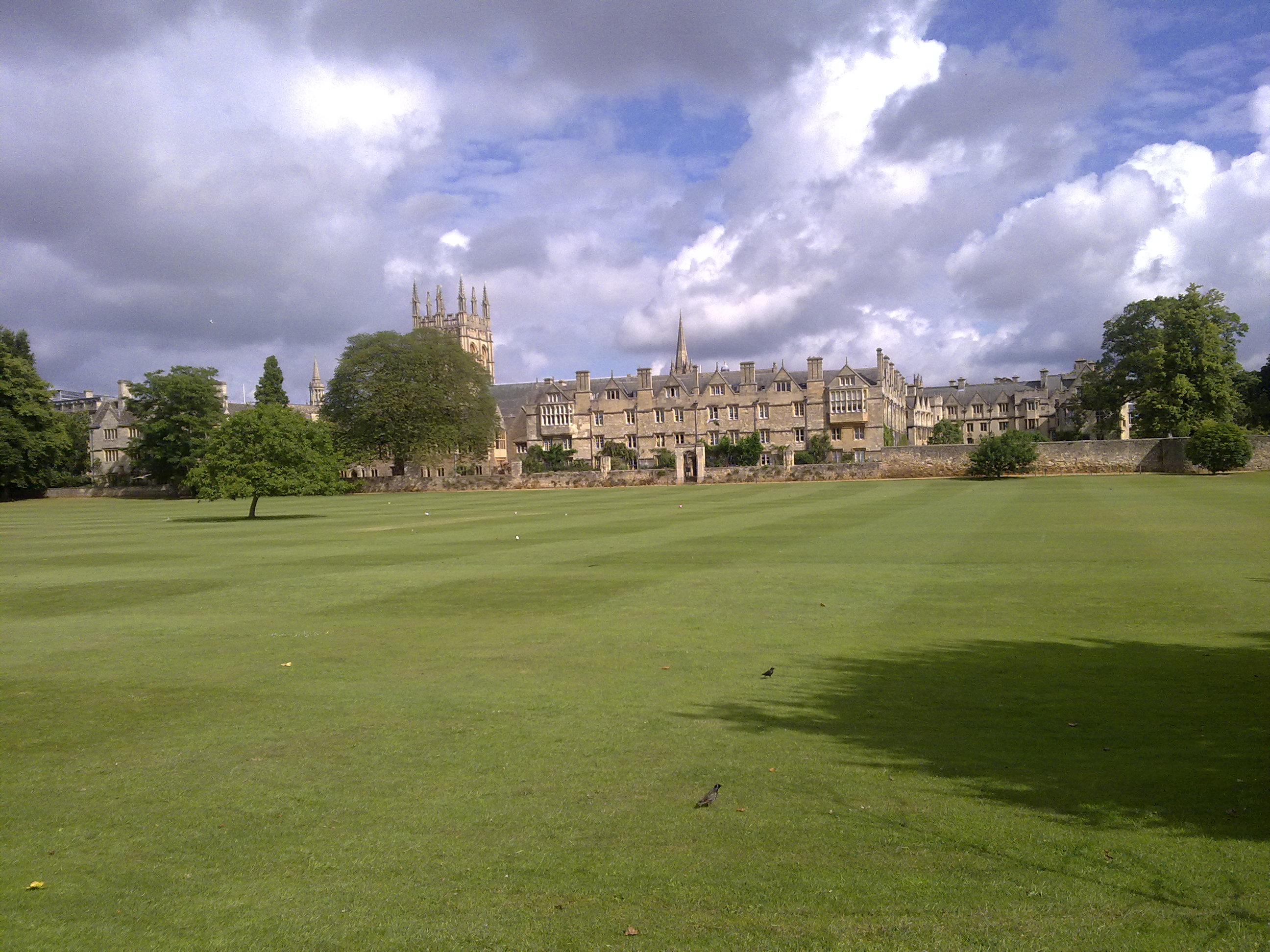
View north of Merton College from across Merton Field north of Christ Church Meadow

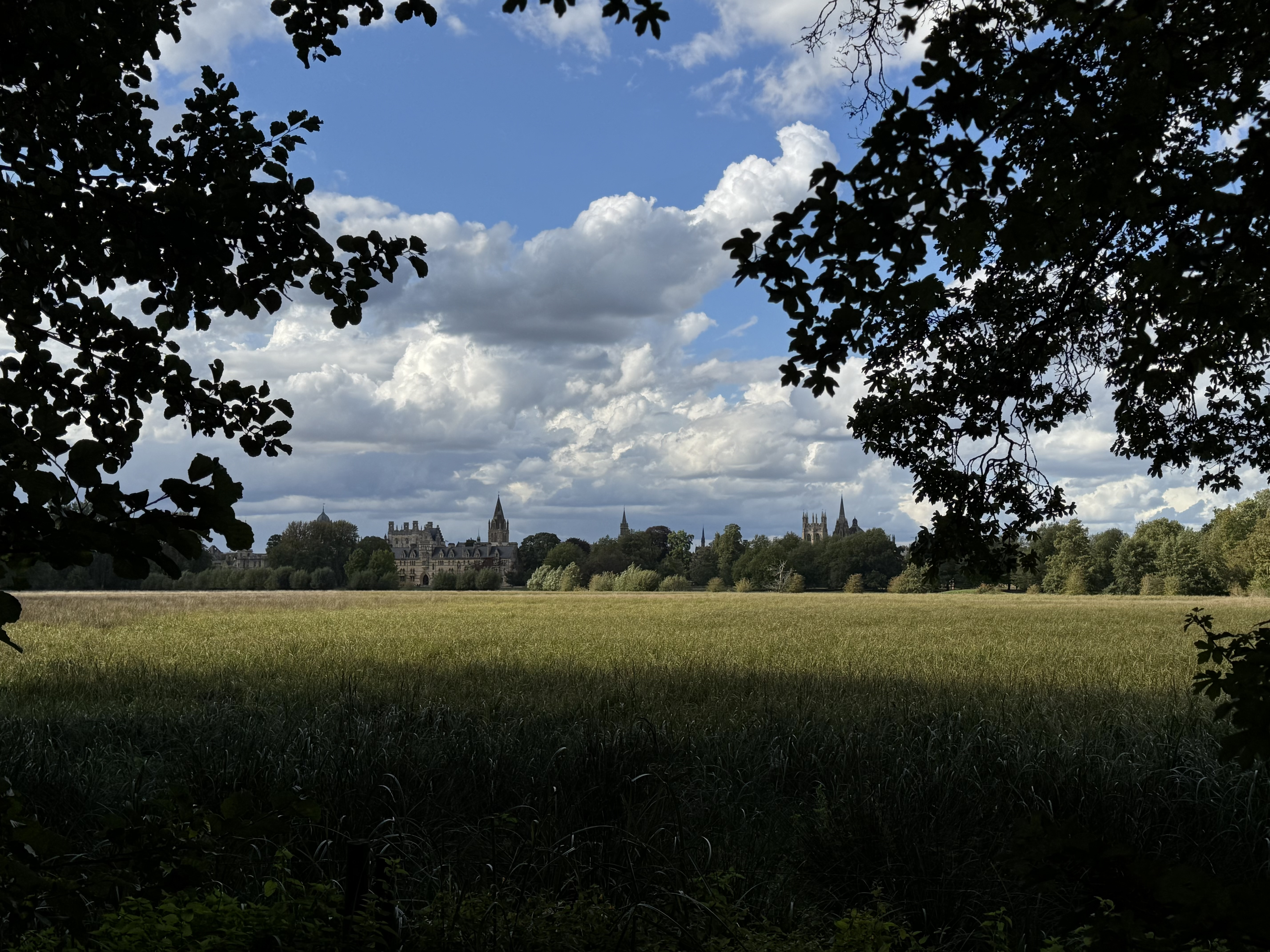
View of the Meadow Building from the southern end of Christ Church Meadow

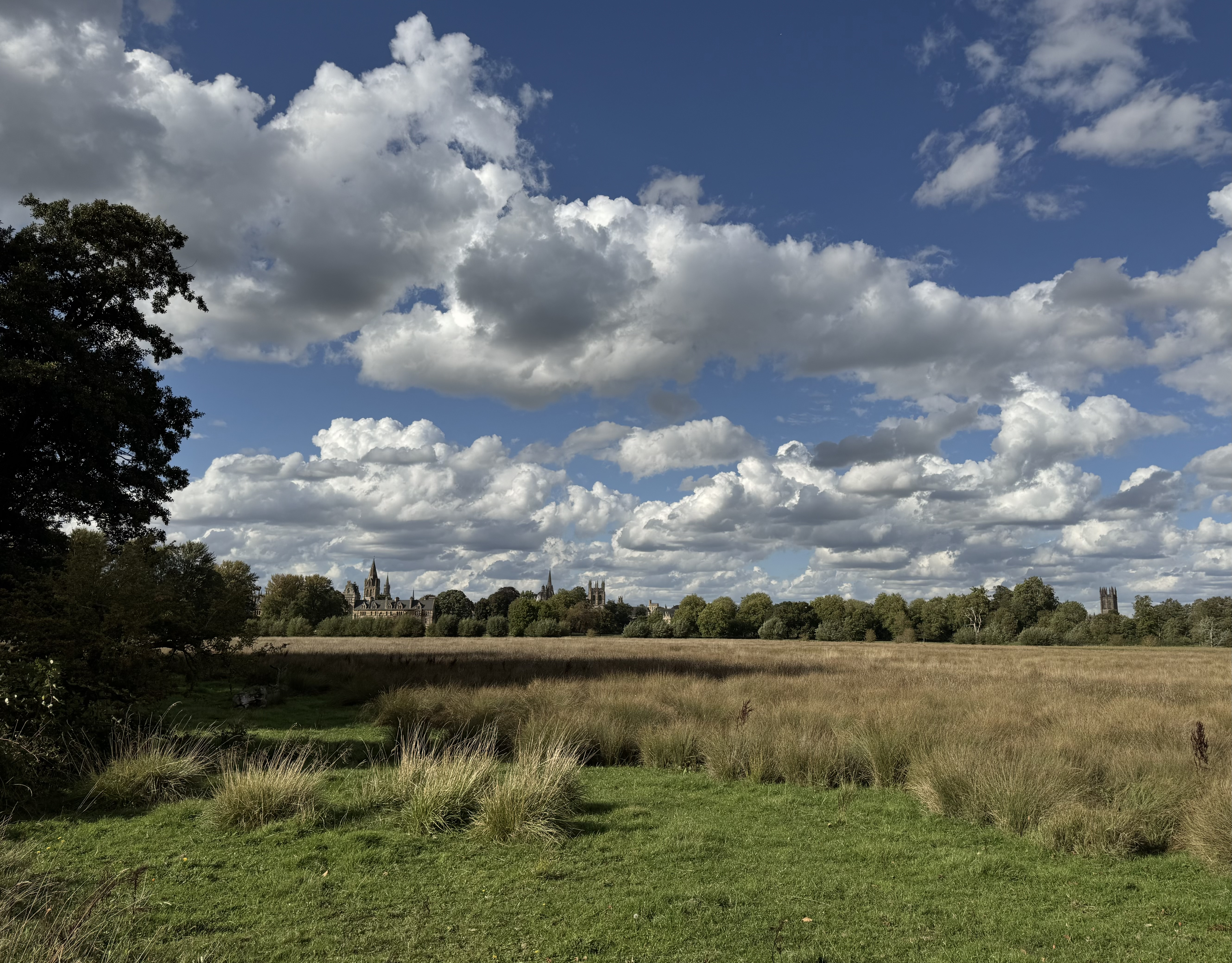
View of the Meadow Building from the southern end of Christ Church Meadow
