= Oxford city walls =

Defensive walls in Oxford, UK

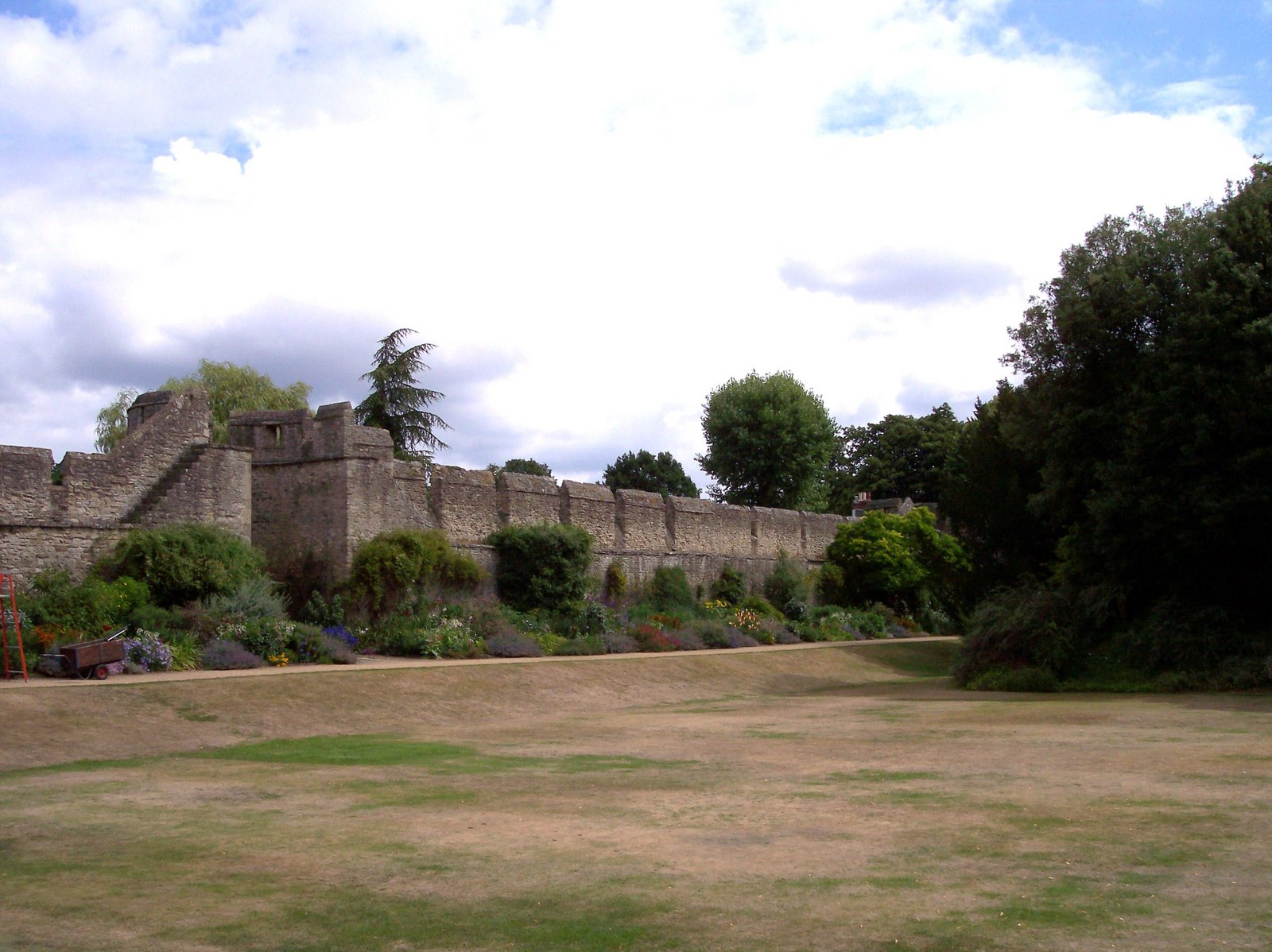
- Wall and bastion in the garden of New College

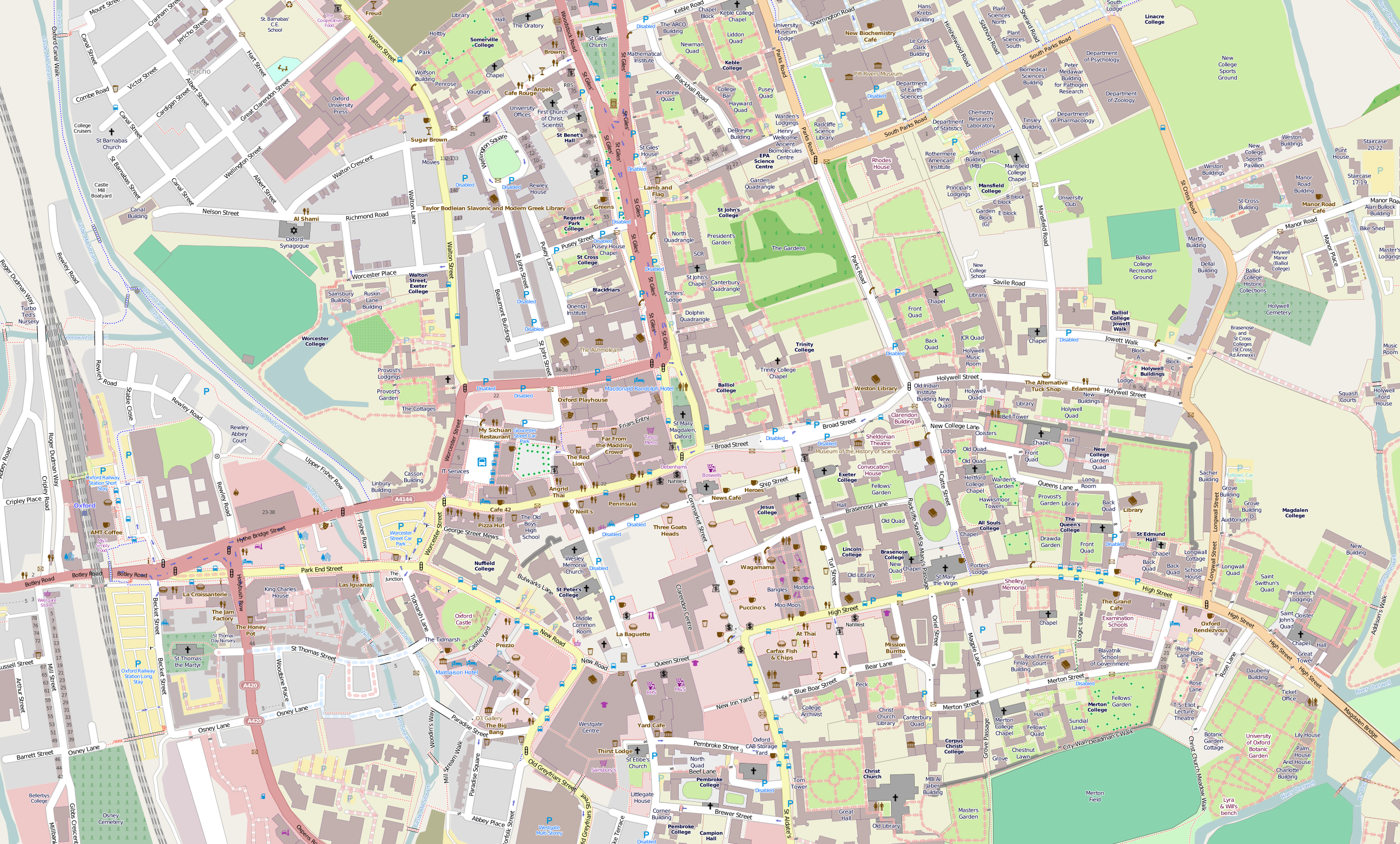
- Location within Oxford
- 51.7531°N 1.2614°W
- Type: City walls
- Location: Oxford, England

History
- Built: 1226-1240

Site notes
- Architectural style: Defensive
- Governing body: Privately owned

Scheduled monument
- Official name: Oxford city walls
- Reference no.: 1003648

Listed Building – Grade I
- Official name: Bastion 1
- Designated: 12 January 1954
- Reference no.: 1184380

Oxford city walls are the remains of a defensive wall which encircled the medieval town of Oxford, England. Constructed from 1226 the walls enclose an area of some 120 acres (50 ha) with a circumference of approximately 2 miles (3 km). Built in stone, the curtain walls were castellated and pierced with over twenty-five bastions. The walls were a development of an earlier defensive system begun under the Saxons in response to Viking incursions in the 9th and 10th centuries. They featured a relatively rare example of concentric walling which may derive from near Eastern or north Wallian examples. During the English Civil War the walls were supplemented by an array of earthen field defences. The remnants of the walls are a scheduled monument and incorporate some twenty-seven Grade I listed structures.

== History ==
Anglo-Saxon Oxford would likely have derived protection from a ditch-earth-timber defensive structure. The Anglo-Saxon defensive system is referenced in the Domesday Book, where the town is described as a 'civitas', with dwellings "within as well as without the wall". Some archaeological research suggests that the Saxon wall may have been topped with a stone revetment. In addition to uncertainty around the structure and composition of the Saxon defences, there is wider debate around the development and extent of the burh that was established at Oxford. Jeremy Haslam, of Leicester University, in a paper published in 2010, has argued that the development of the burh took place somewhat earlier than was accepted for most of the 20th century, as part of a Saxon strategic response to Viking incursions. Excavations at Oriel College in 2024 appear to support the view that the Saxon town was also built to a square plan, "following the model of walled Roman towns such as Winchester". In a later paper, published in 2021 following excavations at Oxford Castle, Haslam contends that the "rampart core" of the defences, comprising gravel, soil and turf, was strengthened by a stone wall. In the same paper, Haslam considers the argument that the St George's Tower of Oxford Castle, previously considered to be Norman, has its origins in the Saxon defences, perhaps as the gatehouse for the West Gate into the city. (Note: While Haslam is unconvinced that the tower was a gatehouse, he is of the view that the tower's setting, its architectural features, and its spatial relationship to other elements of the defences, suggests a Saxon, rather than a Norman, origin.)

In the early 13th century, the Saxon wall was replaced with an encircling curtain wall wholly in stone, enclosing the core of the medieval city. Defensive bastions were placed at multiple points on the wall to enable defenders to direct flanking fire at attackers. The wall incorporated four main, and a number of minor, gates. The major four, aligned to the cardinal points had toll-roads which met at Carfax in the centre of the city. The walls, when fully extant, formed a roughly rectangular shape, reflecting the greater size of the medieval town when compared with the Saxon settlement. The walls ran along the southern line of George Street, Holywell Street and Broad Street in the north; by New College and the Botanic Garden in the east; along the boundaries of Merton College and the great quadrangle of Christ Church to the south; and Castle Street and the castle to the west.

Funding for the construction and maintenance of the walls was through a system of taxation known as murage. (Note: In the Anglo-Saxon period, funds were obtained through the Burghal Hidage system.) In the 11th century, this saw some 210 householders in the town, owners of what were termed "mural mansions", carry responsibility for raising funds for the wall. In return, the owners were granted exemption from all other taxes and obligations, with the exception of feudal military service. In a paper of 1990 Hilary Turner sought to identify the "mural mansions" within the city, dated to a writ of 1227 issued by the Sheriff of Oxford demanding support for the maintenance of the wall. This source of funding proved inadequate to support the major rebuilding of the walls carried out between 1226 and 1240, and was supplemented, and eventually superseded, by a system of tolls (taxes) levied on goods being brought into the city. (Note: A contemporaneous revenue-raising exercise for the fortification of the city of Bristol is detailed in a patent roll dating from 1232. This records some 20 different duties to be levied on goods coming into the city for a period of two years, including two pennies on every laden boat, a penny on every cask of wine, a half-penny on every loaded cart, and a quarter-penny on every thousand of herring.)

The town's seal, dating from 1191 and the oldest in England, depicts the burgh as a "triple-towered walled city with an ox superimposed". In a review of Oliver Creighton and Richard Higham's Medieval Town Walls, published in the archaeology journal Antiquity in 2006, Jane Grenville of the University of York considers the authors' argument on the importance of symbolism to a town's medieval governors, and that a desire to construct, in stone on earth, their vision of a multi-towered, walled, Jerusalem in heaven, was often an important motivation in the construction of a town's defences. In 1542 the town was granted city status. Its expansion, and the declining need for defence, saw the deterioration of the walls, and their demolition in some places, and the destruction of the city gates. South Gate had already been pulled down by Cardinal Wolsey as part of his development of Cardinal College (now Christ Church) in 1525. West Gate followed in 1600. In 1642, when Charles I relocated his capital to Oxford, the inadequate state of the city walls made it necessary to undertake construction of additional field defences, on the ditch-and-rampart model, to provide security. In an echo of the earlier fundraising approaches, the king ordered that all men of the city aged between 16 and 60 devote one day a week to unpaid labour on the works, or pay a fine of one shilling. Defaulters were to be expelled from the city. The extent of the Civil War earthworks is shown in a plan of the fortifications drawn up by Bernard de Gomme, the king's military engineer who likely also designed them. The 18th century saw further decline in the condition of the walls; the North and East Gates were demolished in 1772, much of the walling was converted into garden features for the university's colleges, (Note: Such embellishment continues. In the 21st century the fellows of Christ Church renovated Bastion 21, which stands in the college's private garden, and enhanced it with the addition of a roof terrace.) and the bastions were inhabited as tenements.

Oxford's experience was not unique. Since the 18th century, and gathering momentum in the 19th and 20th, medieval town walls and gates were increasingly viewed as undesirable impediments to the free movement of goods and people, particularly with the advent of the motor car. Their destruction was widespread; by the 20th century, of some 200 walled communities in England and Wales, only two, York and Conwy, retained all of their original medieval gates. In response, from the mid-20th century, many medieval gates and walls were given statutory protection, Oxford's being designated at the highest grade, for "buildings of exceptional interest", in the mid-1950s. Following a tradition established at the foundation of New College in 1379, the college, which owns the best-preserved sections of wall in the city, must submit to a triennial inspection of the walls by the Lord Mayor of Oxford and a delegation of councillors. (Note: The senior civil servant Sir Brian Unwin recorded his initial impressions when arriving as an undergraduate at New College in October 1955; "the magnificent gilded, wrought iron gateway into the gardens, which are dominated by the sixteenth-century Mount, said to have been used as a gun emplacement in the Civil War, and bordered by the medieval Oxford city walls".)

== Architecture and description ==
The walls are constructed in local rubble stone with some ashlar dressings. The bastions are hollow - having no inner walls. (Note: An environmental study on the effects of ivy on masonry, carried out in 2010 by Oxford University and using some sections of the Oxford city walls as part of the sample, challenged the traditional assumption that the impact of ivy on stone was wholly negative, finding instead a range of benefits including protection from weather, temperature and pollution challenges.) Many have traditional merlons with loopholes to allow for the discharge of crossbows. A notable feature of the north-northeast section of the medieval wall, the position requiring the greatest additional defense as it lacks the natural riverine protection enjoyed by the southern and western sections, (Note: The unknown 12th-century author of the Deeds of King Stephen wrote of the town's protection from the "very deep water that washes it all around".) was the construction of a secondary wall, outside of the main enceinte. (Note: An enceinte is the main enclosure of a castle or fortified town, and the area that is enclosed. This primary enclosure may be supplemented by secondary defences, e.g. an outer wall, or subsidiary structures, such as a bailey.) This is thought to date from around the 1280s. Nicholas Pevsner and Jennifer Sherwood, in their Oxfordshire volume in the Buildings of England series, revised and reissued in 2002, draw comparison with the concentric walling at the Tower of London and at Dover Castle, and suggest that the development reflected the most up-to-date military thinking of the time, drawn from the experience of Constantinople and Arabic castles of the Near East gained by Western European soldiery during the Crusades. Another Western European example is the Cité de Carcassonne, given such defensive double walling some ninety years before the construction of the Oxford medieval walls. Nicholas Palmer, in a paper on excavations carried out at Hertford College in 1975, suggests an alternative inspiration for the innovation. Noting that the sequence of the earliest concentric castles in North Wales, Rhuddlan, Harlech and Beaumaris, begun in the late 1270s, and that Edward I pressed into service masons and carpenters from across England, including from Oxford, Palmer suggests that the knowledge gained in North Wales may then have been fed back to inspire the burghers of Oxford in their building programme of the 1280s. In his revised Oxfordshire Pevsner, published in 2023, Simon Bradley describes the northern outer wall as "unique among English medieval town defences".

The wall and bastions are collectively a scheduled monument and include some 27 Grade I listed structures.

== Gallery ==
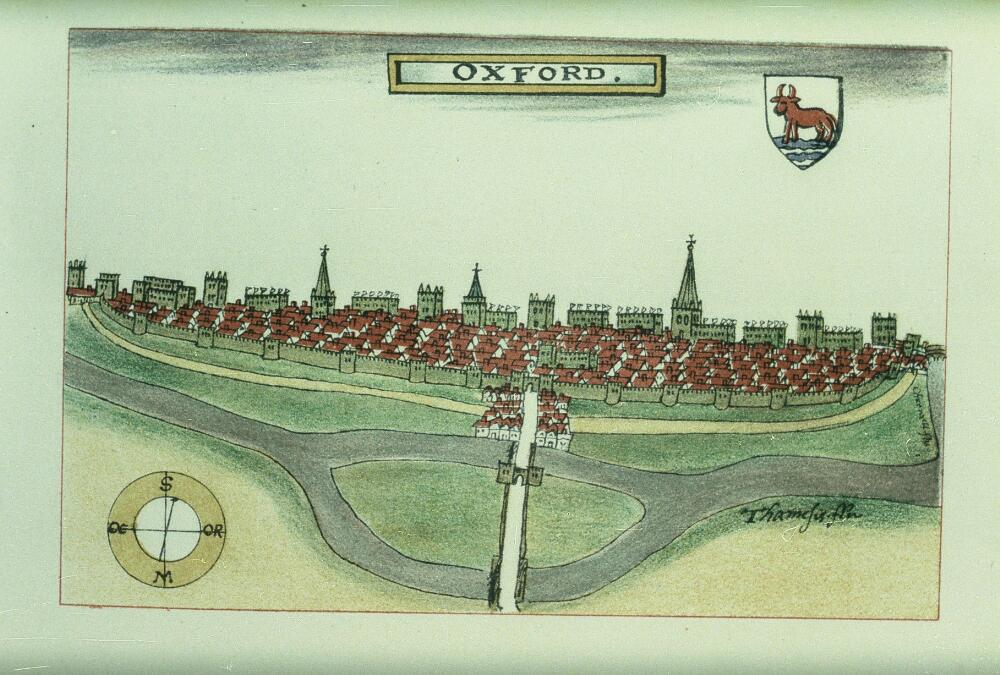
The wall and bastions depicted in a 1588 illustration

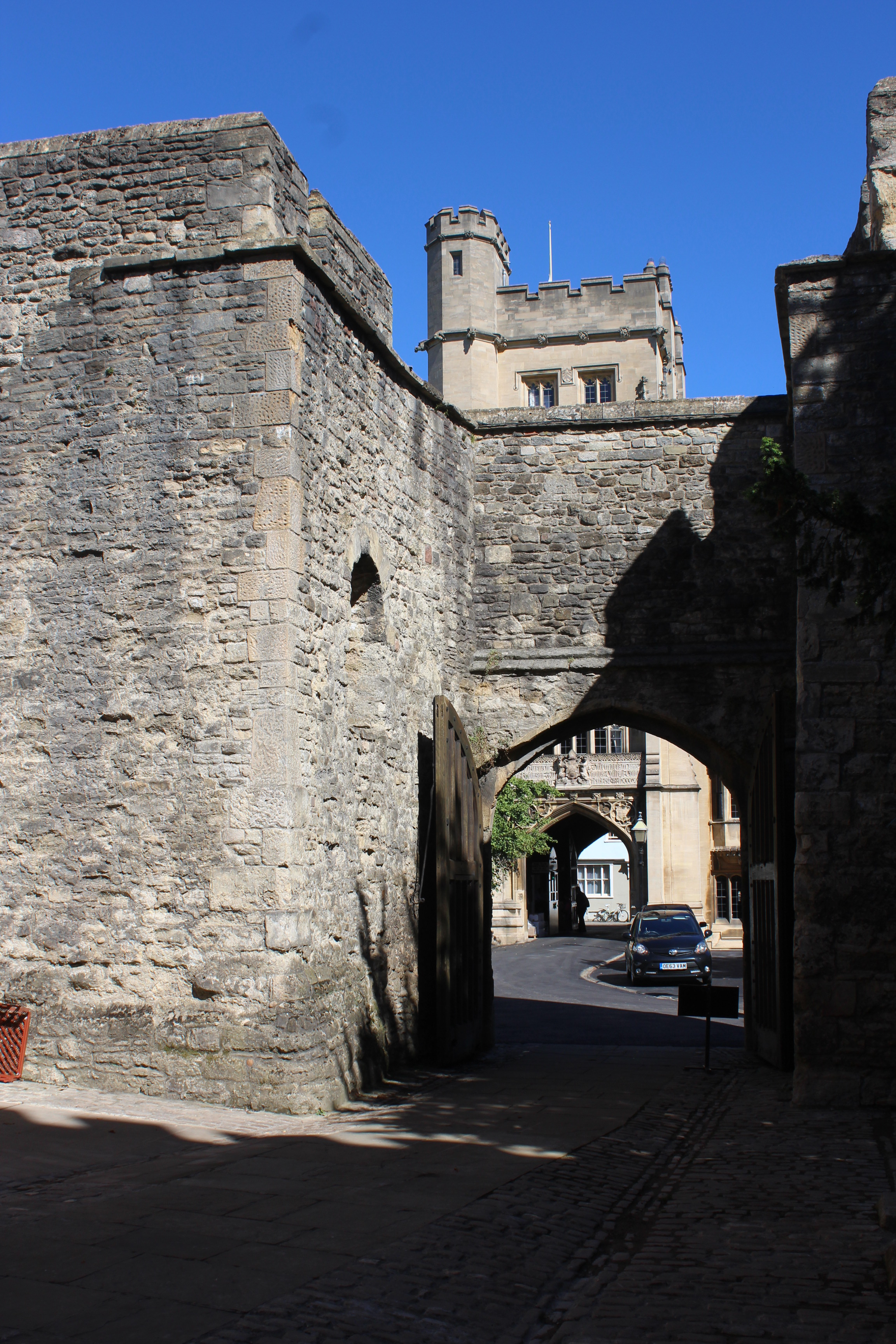
Bastion No.12 - an exterior view

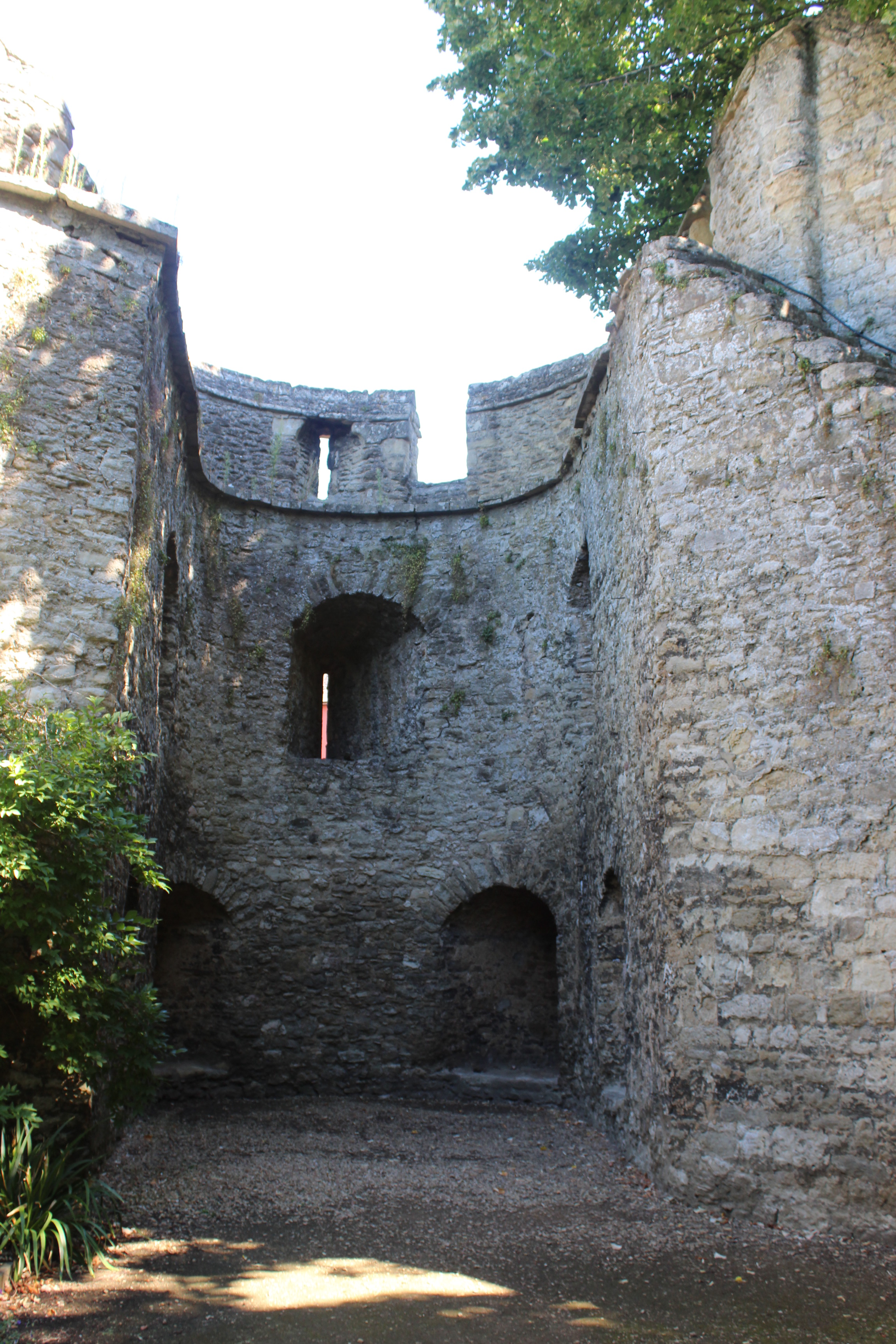
Bastion No.14 - an interior view, showing the hollow construction and the rampart walkway

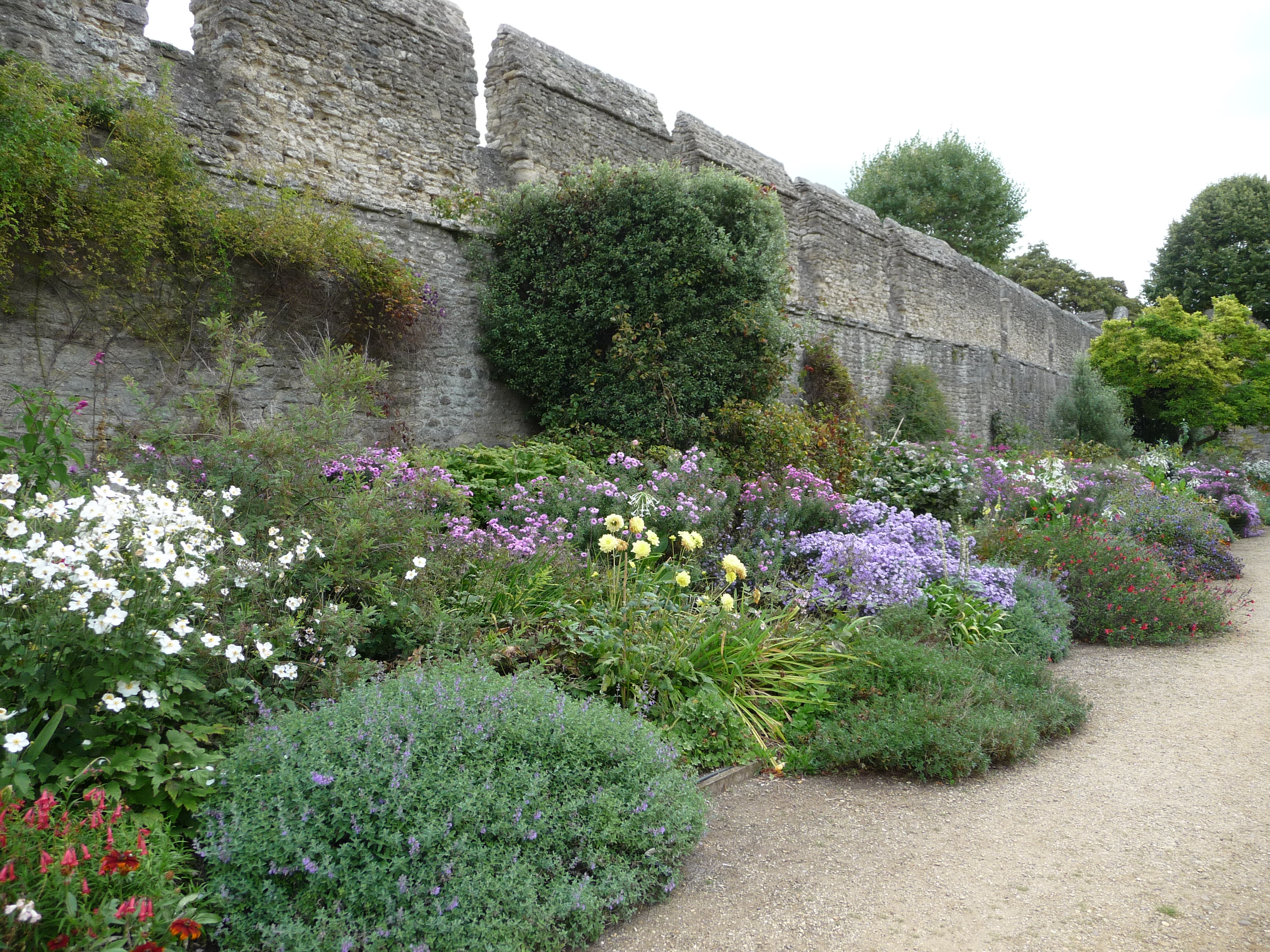
The wall at New College, perhaps the best preserved section

== Sources ==
- Appleby, J. T. (1969). The Troubled Reign of King Stephen. New York: Barnes & Noble. OCLC 185802337.
- Bradley, Simon; Pevsner, Nikolaus; Sherwood, Jennifer (2023). Oxfordshire: Oxford and the South-East. The Buildings of England. New Haven, US and London: Yale University Press. ISBN 978-0-300-20929-7.
- Bruce, D. M.; Creighton, Oliver (2008). "Contested identities: the dissonant heritage of European town walls and walled town" (PDF). International Journal of Heritage Studies: 1–20.
- Bush, Henry (1828). "3: Murage, keyage and pavage". Bristol Town Duties A Collection of Original and Interesting Documents [Etc.]. Bristol. OCLC 847533195.
- Chance, Eleanor; Colvin, Christina; Cooper, Janet; Day, C. J.; Hassall, T. G.; Jessup, Mary; Selwyn, Nesta (1979). "City Walls, Gates, and Posterns". A History of the County of Oxford. Victoria County History. Vol. 4: The City of Oxford. London: Victoria County History. OCLC 220842953.
- Grenville, Jane (2006). "Medieval town walls: Oliver Creighton & Robert Higham - Review". Antiquity. 80. Cambridge: Cambridge University Press.
- Haslam, Jeremy (2010). "The Two Anglo-Saxon Burhs of Oxford" (PDF). Oxoniensia. 75. Oxfordshire Architectural and Historical Society: 15–33.
- — (2021). "The late tenth-century defences of Oxford and the towers of St George and St Michael". Archaeological Journal. 178 (2). Taylor & Francis: 252–279. doi:10.1080/00665983.2021.1886707.
- Kemp, Anthony (1977). "The Fortification of Oxford during the Civil War" (PDF). Oxoniensia. Oxfordshire Architectural and Historical Society: 237–249.
- Palmer, Nicholas (1976). "Excavations on the outer city wall of Oxford in St Helen's Passage and Hertford College" (PDF). Oxoniensia. 41. Oxfordshire Architectural and Historical Society: 148–160.
- Poore, Daniel; Norton, Andrew; Dodd, Anne (2009). "Excavations at Oxford Castle: Oxford's Western Quarter from the Mid-Saxon Period to the Late Eighteenth Century" (PDF). Oxoniensia. LXXIV. Oxfordshire Architectural and Historical Society: 1–18.
- Royal Commission on the Historical Monuments of England (1939). An Inventory of the Historical Monuments in the City of Oxford. London: HMSO. OCLC 3806593.
- Sherwood, Jennifer; Pevsner, Nikolaus (2002). Oxfordshire. The Buildings of England. New Haven, US and London: Yale University Press. ISBN 978-0-300-09639-2.
- Turner, Hilary L. (1990). "The Mural Mansions of Oxford: Attempted Identifications" (PDF). Oxoniensia. 55. Oxfordshire Architectural and Historical Society: 73–79.
- Unwin, Brian (2016). With Respect, Minister: A View from Inside Whitehall. London: Bloomsbury Publishing. ISBN 978-1-786-73135-7.
