= Merton College Chapel =

Church in Oxford, England

Merton College Chapel, Oxford
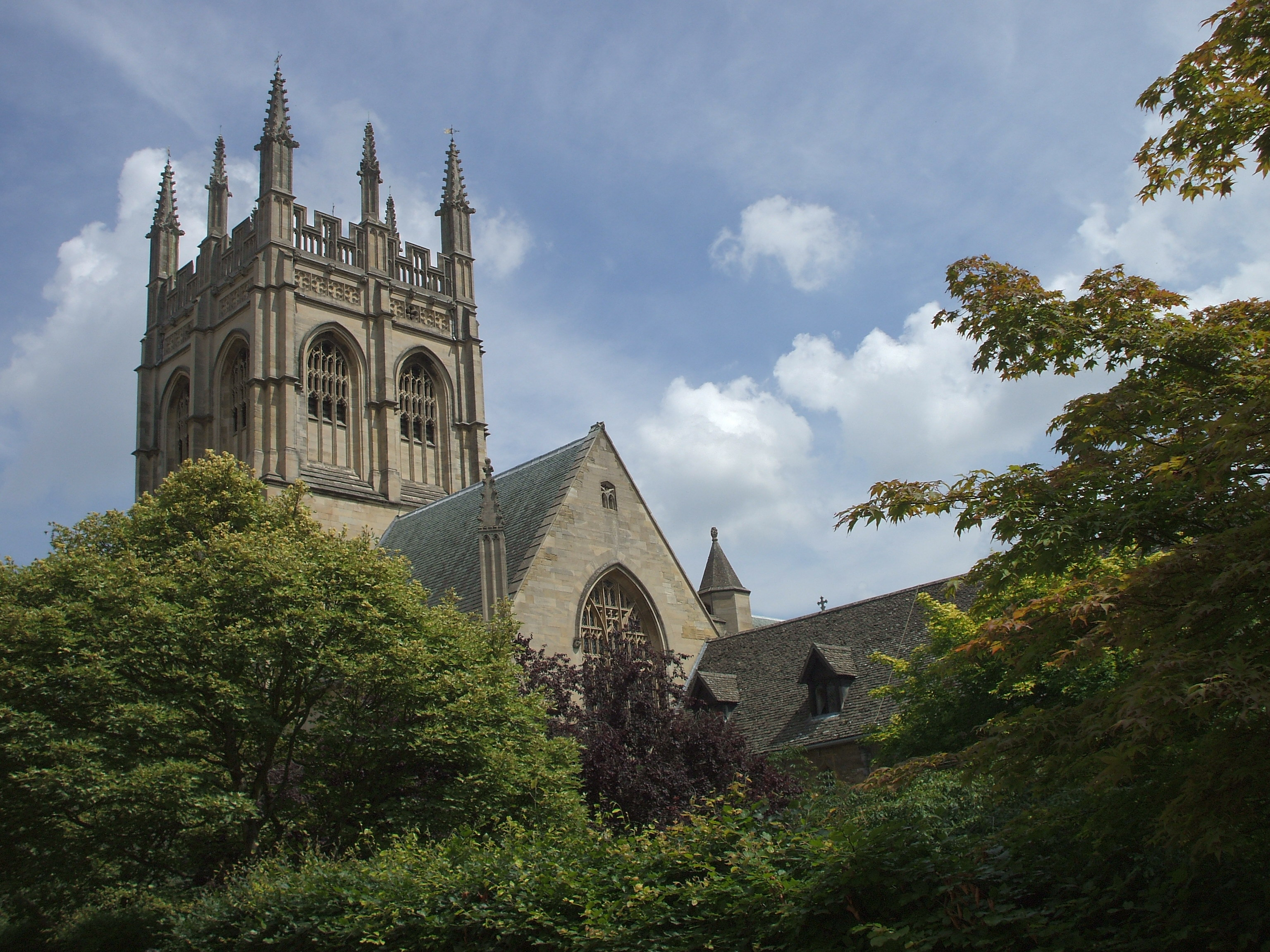
- Merton College Chapel viewed from Grove Walk.
- Merton College Chapel, Oxford
- OS grid reference: SP 51695 06083
- Location: Merton College, Oxford
- Country: England
- Denomination: Church of England
- Website: Official website

History
- Founder: Walter de Merton
- Dedication: St Mary and St John the Baptist

Architecture
- Style: Gothic
- Groundbreaking: c1290
- Completed: 1294 (choir) transepts (1424–5) tower 1448–51

Administration
- Diocese: Oxford

Merton College Chapel is the church of Merton College, Oxford, England. Dedicated to St Mary and St John the Baptist, the chapel was largely completed in its present form by the end of the 13th century. The building retains a number of original stained glass windows, and is noted for its acoustics. A choral foundation was established in 2008 by Peter Phillips.

== History ==
=== 13th century origins ===
On 13 September 1266 the church of St John the Baptist was granted to the scholars of Merton College by the Abbey of Reading. However, by the late 1280s it had fallen into "a ruinous condition", and Merton college accounts show that work on a new church on the same site began in about 1290.

The present choir with its enormous east window was complete by 1294. The window is an important example (because it is so well dated) of how the strict geometrical conventions of the Early English Period of architecture were beginning to be relaxed at the end of the 13th century.

Unusually for an English religious building, much medieval glass survives intact. Of the seven pairs of windows in the side walls of the Quire, twelve retain original 13th century glass, set in Decorated tracery. The glass was donated to the Chapel sometime between 1289 and 1296 by Henry Mansfield. The scene of the Annunciation in the East Window also dates from the late 13th century.

=== 14th and 15th centuries ===
The south transept was built in the 14th century, the north transept in the early 15th century. The great tower was complete by 1450. The chapel replaced the parish church of St. John and continued to serve as the parish church as well as the college chapel until 1891. Because of this, it is generally referred to as Merton Church in older documents, and there is a north door into the street as well as doors into the college. This dual role also probably explains the enormous scale of the chapel, which in its original design was to have a nave and two aisles extending to the west.

=== 16th century and Reformation ===
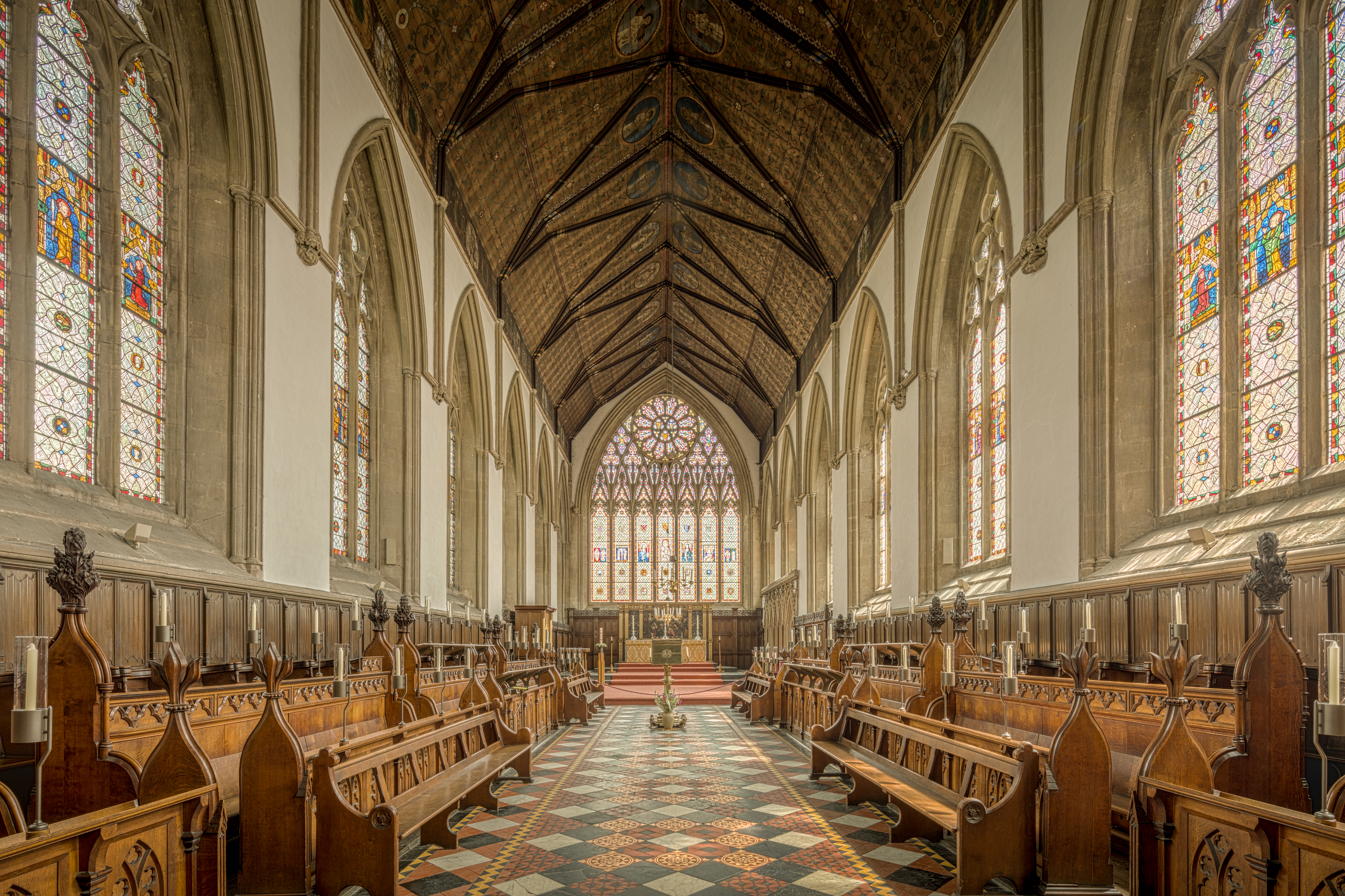
Merton College Chapel in 2017

In the early 16th century, the college appears to have abandoned plans to extend the chapel, as the land on which the nave would have been built was leased in 1517 to Richard Foxe (c. 1448–1528), Bishop of Winchester, founder of Corpus Christi College, next door to Merton. The lectern, one of the finest examples of its kind, dates from the pre-Reformation era; it was a gift from John Martock in 1504.

The Reformation did not leave Merton Chapel untouched. During the reign of the zealously Protestant Edward VI (1547–1553), traditional forms of worship began to change, and it was most likely at that time that the medieval stained glass was removed or hidden. The glass in the chancel windows, for example, was protected by being boarded over and whitewashed. The wall paintings behind the stalls were also saved; but they were destroyed in 1651 "to the sorrow of curious men that were admirers of ancient painting". The Edwardian reforms also saw the removal from the Chapel of the traditional service books, vestments, furnishings, and images, all considered offensive to the new religion.

King Edward died young, and during the reign of his sister Mary I (1553–1558) Catholicism was restored, and enthusiastically embraced by the college. Soon afterwards, under Elizabeth I, Protestantism was once again enforced and Merton College found itself facing a siege by Elizabeth's Archbishop of Canterbury, Matthew Parker, for three weeks, in defence of the old religion.

=== 17th century ===
The church was in a bad physical state by the 17th century. The medieval glass of the transepts and the lower part of the Great East Window were broken, apparently between 1646 and 1655. In any event, by 1634 the building was in considerable disrepair, and the medieval floor tiles were replaced with black and white marble. In 1655 the roof of the south transept roof collapsed, damaging many of the medieval monuments. This led to a number of rebuilding projects by architects including Christopher Wren and Edward Blore. In 1671 Wren was instructed to install a new screen at the then considerable cost of £1,130, as well as stalls carved in the classical style.

=== 20th century ===
During World War II the ancient stained glass was removed from the chapel windows to protect it from enemy bombs; the glass was stored in a vault under the New Bodleian Library. On 23 January 1967 Fr Michael Hollings celebrated the first Roman Catholic Mass to have been held in the chapel since the Reformation.

== Choral foundation ==
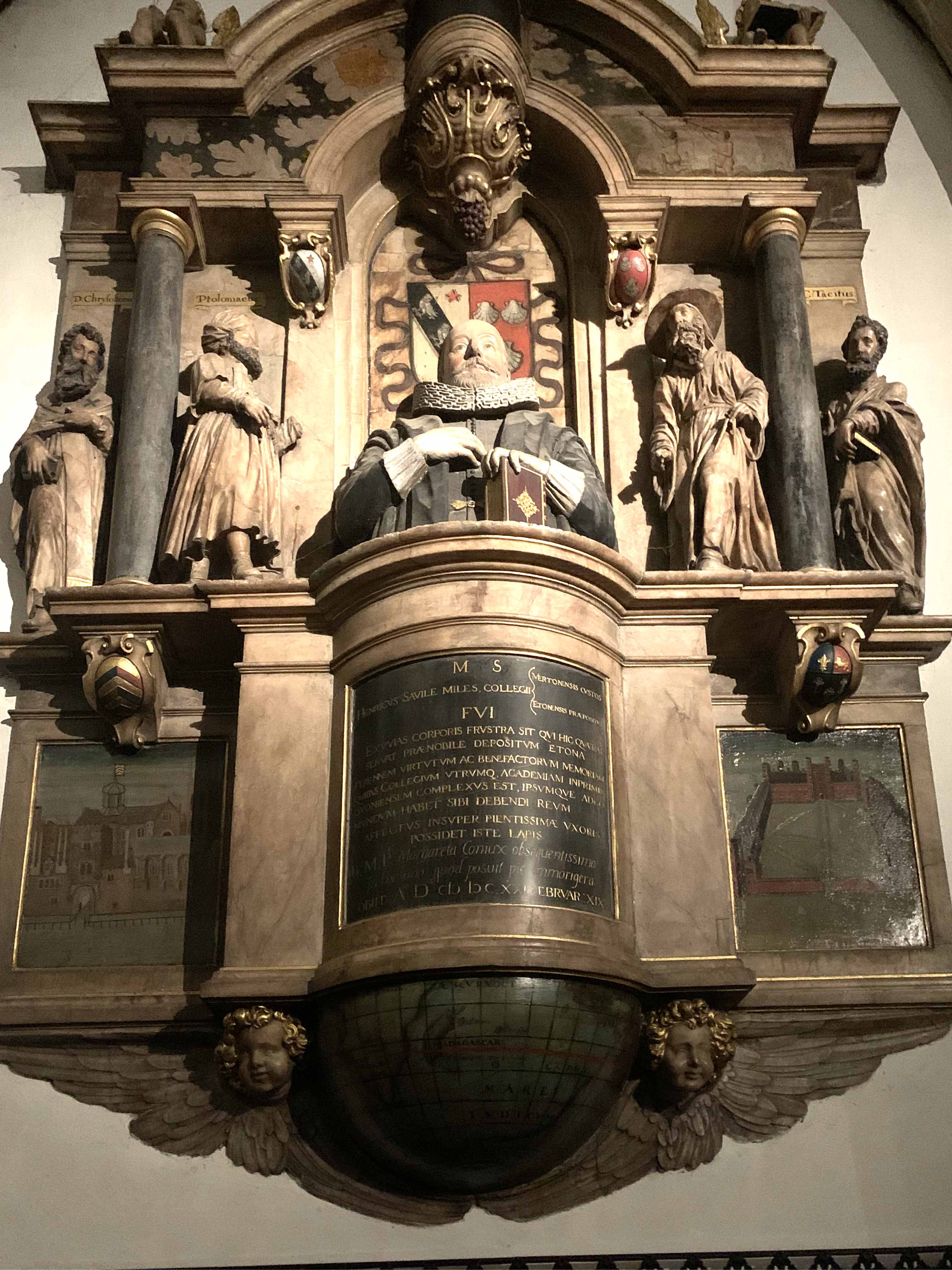
Henry Savile Memorial, Merton College Chapel

A new choral foundation was established in 2008 when Peter Phillips and Benjamin Nicholas were appointed Directors of Music. The College Choir consists of thirty singers, of whom eighteen are choral scholars; there are also two organ scholars. Since the establishment of Merton’s Choral Foundation in 2008, the choir has gained an international reputation for offering choral music through tours, recordings and broadcasts. The choir features prominently during Merton's annual festival Passiontide at Merton.

=== Tours and performances ===
The choir has appeared at the Three Choirs Festival and the Cheltenham Music Festival, and London appearances include the concert series at St John's, Smith Square, Cadogan Hall and Temple Church. The choir is frequently heard in concert with orchestra, and recent collaborations have seen the choir perform with the Royal Philharmonic Orchestra (Elgar’s The Apostles), Instruments of Time and Truth (Bach's St Matthew Passion) and Oxford Baroque (Bach's Mass in B minor). The choir's annual festival, Passiontide at Merton, has an established place in Oxford’s musical calendar, and has led to exciting collaborations with such groups as The Cardinall's Musick and The Marian Consort.

Merton College Choir often tours overseas, and has visited the United States, Hong Kong and Singapore, France, Italy and Sweden. In 2017, the choir sang the first Anglican service in St. Peter's Basilica, Vatican City, which was broadcast on BBC Radio 3.

=== Awards ===
In 2020, the choir won the award for best choral album at the BBC Music Magazine Awards for its recording of Gabriel Jackson’s The Passion of our Lord Jesus Christ. The choir’s discography on the Delphian Label has seen numerous five-star reviews and many recordings have been named ‘Editor’s Choice’ by Gramophone magazine.

=== Composers ===
The choir’s commitment to contemporary music has seen numerous composers write for the choir. In recent years the choir has premiered works by Kerry Andrew, Sir Harrison Birtwistle, Bob Chilcott, Jonathan Dove, Ēriks Ešenvalds, Hannah Kendall, James MacMillan, Cecilia McDowall, John Rutter, Dobrinka Tabakova, Cheryl Frances-Hoad and Judith Weir. In July 2021, the choir gave the world premiere of a new work by Daniel Kidane. The choir's repertoire includes a number of pieces written for it by Howard Skempton, Gabriel Jackson and John Tavener.

=== The Merton Choirbook ===
The college celebrated its 750th anniversary in 2014, when the Merton Choirbook was premiered. Many of the leading composers of the day are represented in the Merton Choirbook. The Choirbook includes a text by Sir Geoffrey Hill, Oxford’s Professor of Poetry set by Sir Harrison Birtwistle and works by four female composers, including Judith Weir and Cecilia McDowall. The 'Evening Canticles' appear both in Latin and in English, as well as a number of anthems suitable for the different seasons of the liturgical calendar. The arrival of the new Dobson organ inspired some of the music, including David Briggs’s Messe Solennelle and Chorale Preludes by John Caldwell and Gabriel Jackson.

The Choirbook is also distinguished by the inclusion of composers from further afield. Reflecting the popularity of choral music from the Baltic States, Rihards Dubra and Ēriks Ešenvalds were both been commissioned by the College, as was Norwegian composer Ola Gjeilo, whose setting of Northern Lights has been widely performed, and a setting of "Beati quorum via" by James Lavino, a native American composer.

The Merton Choirbook underlines the College’s active role in creativity and innovation, while remaining a lasting musical resource.

=== Merton College Girl Choristers ===
In 2016 Merton College became the first College in Oxford University to admit girls into its Choral Foundation. The 24 girl choristers attend many different schools across Oxford and beyond. Receiving specialist musical training from the College’s professional musicians, they sing Choral Vespers each Monday and Choral Evensong each Wednesday during the University term, often with six professional adult singers who sing the lower parts. In addition, the choristers undertake a number of concerts and other activities each year, including performing in the Passiontide at Merton festival, the Oxford Lieder Festival and in their own series of Christmas Carol concerts and services.

In 2022, the Merton College Girl Choristers released their debut solo album, In the Stillness, A Merton Christmas. This recording includes music by Sally Beamish, Errollyn Wallen, John Joubert, Gabriel Jackson, John Rutter, Edward Elgar and Benjamin Britten.

== Modern era ==
=== Dobson Organ ===
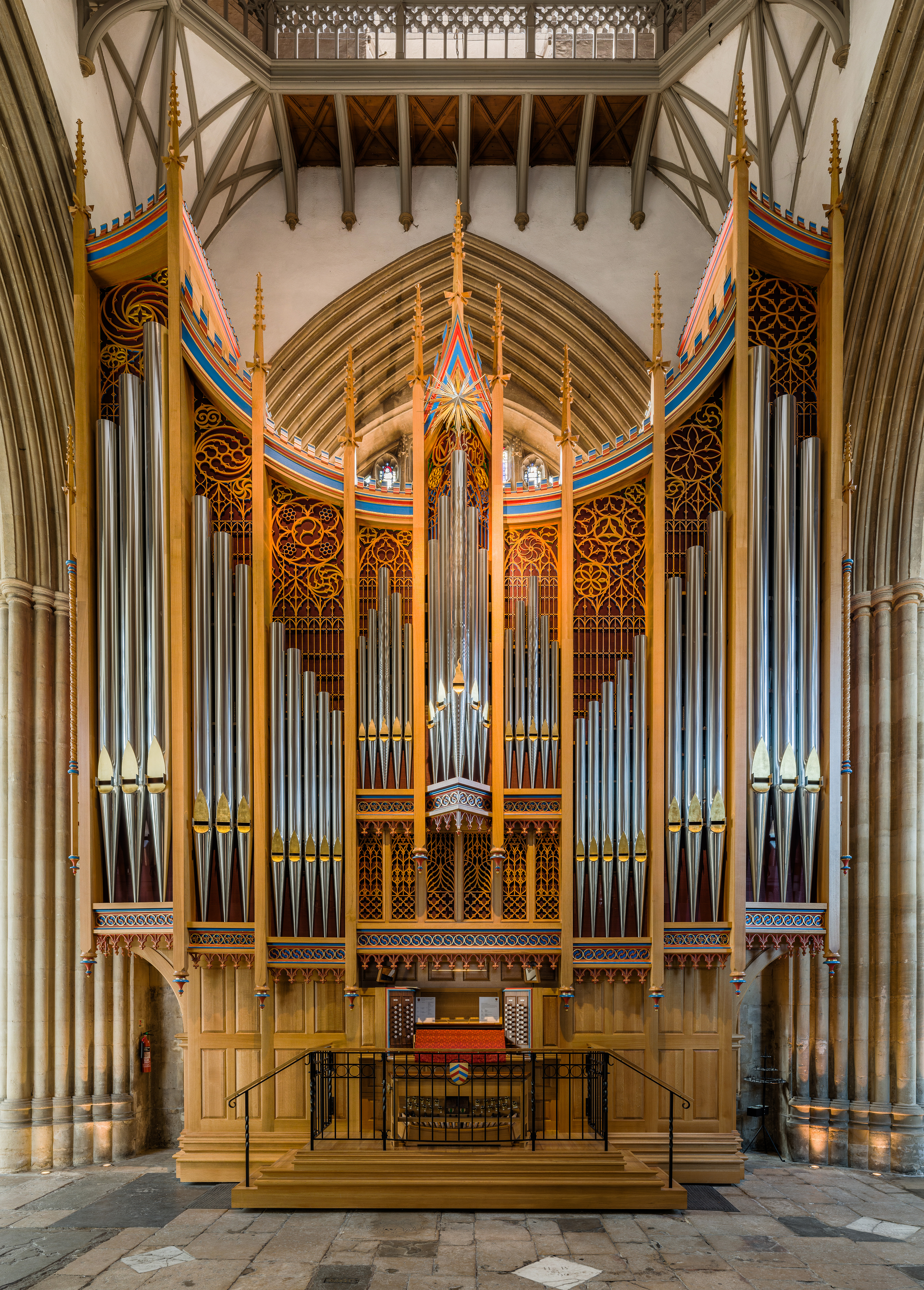
The chapel organ

The College commissioned a new organ to be installed, to coincide with its 750th anniversary celebrations. The organ was built by Dobson Pipe Organ Builders from Lake City, Iowa and arrived in August 2013. It was officially opened at the Organ Festival weekend in April 2014. The organ consists of 44 ranks over three manuals. The specification encourages the performance of a wide repertoire, and the organ sounds equally thrilling in music from the Baroque era and in the great romantic masterworks.

Many of the world's finest organists have given concerts on the Dobson Organ including John Scott (who opened the instrument), James O'Donnell, Paul Jacobs, Thomas Trotter, Martin Baker, Stephen Farr, Thomas Ospital, Simon Johnson, Olivier Latry, and Robert Quinney. During the academic year 2014/2015, Daniel Hyde played the complete works of Johann Sebastian Bach in a series of 21 recitals.

=== Chapel spire ===
A spire from the chapel has resided in Pavilion Garden VI of the University of Virginia since 1928, when "it was given to the University to honor Jefferson's educational ideals".

== Gallery ==
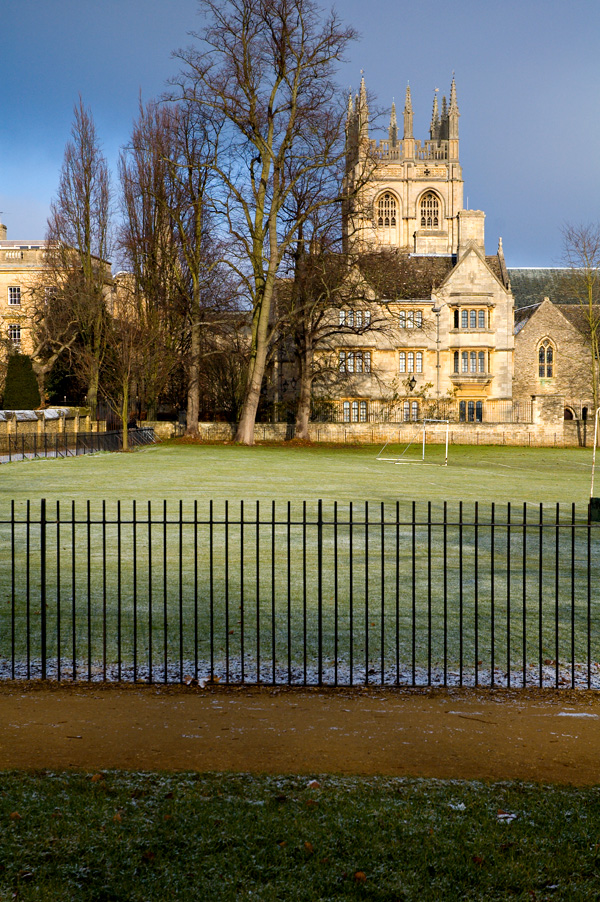
Merton College from Christ Church Meadow

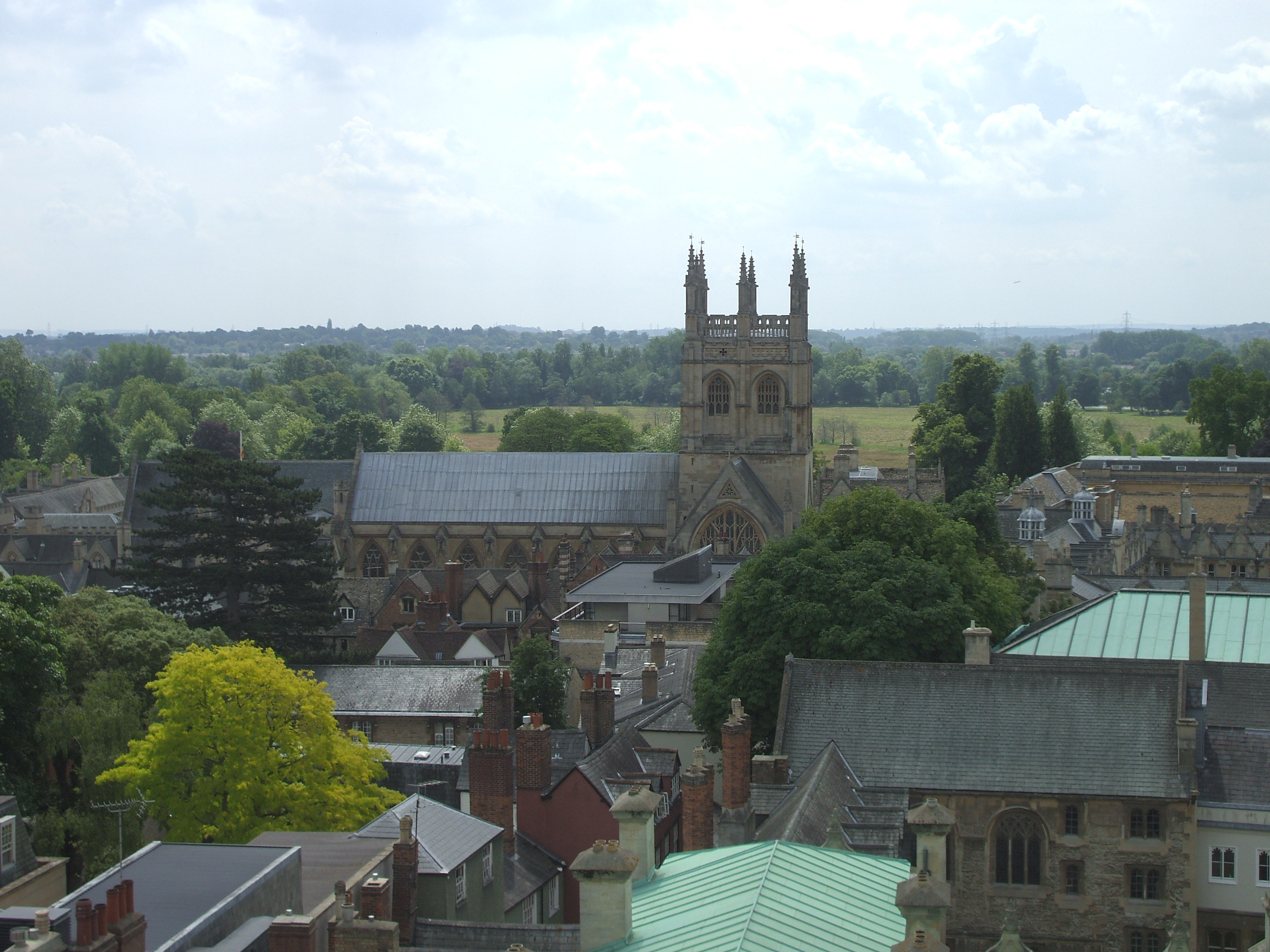
Merton College (including chapel) viewed from the north from St Mary's Church

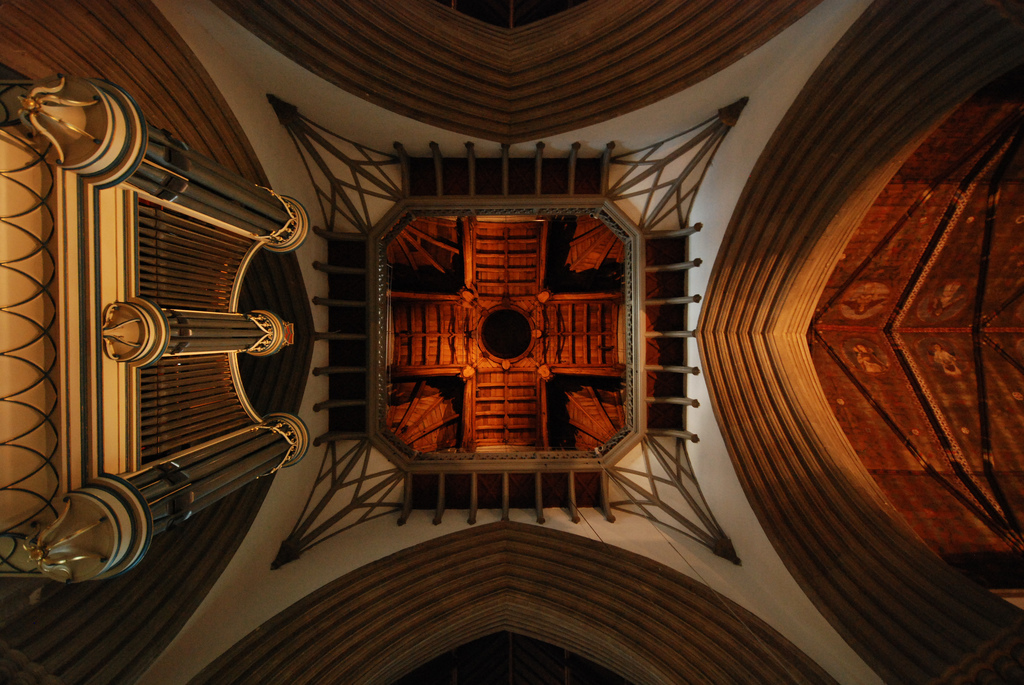
The interior of the chapel from under the tower, looking towards the roof, with the former organ on the left

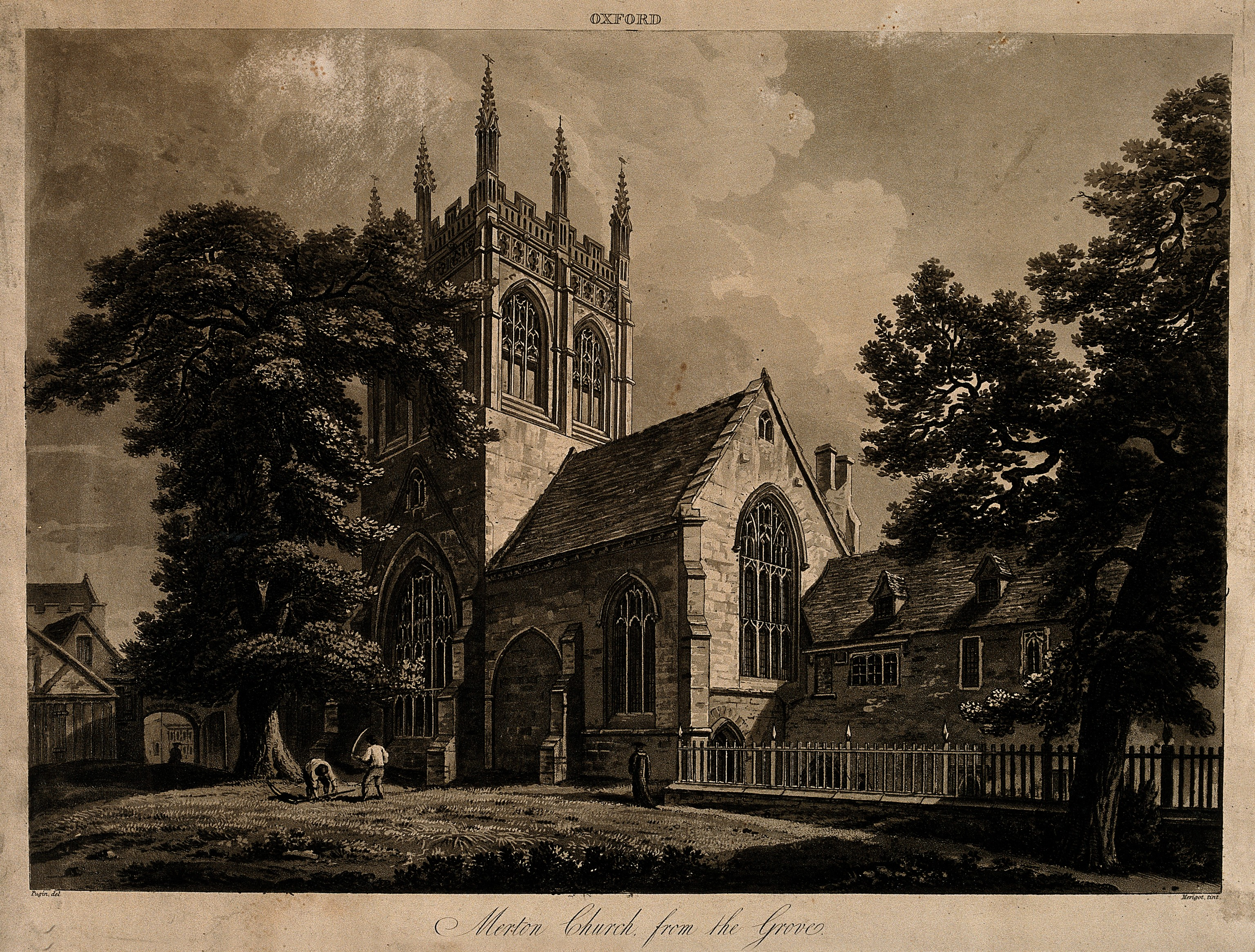
Late 18th or early 19th century aquatint by James Merigot

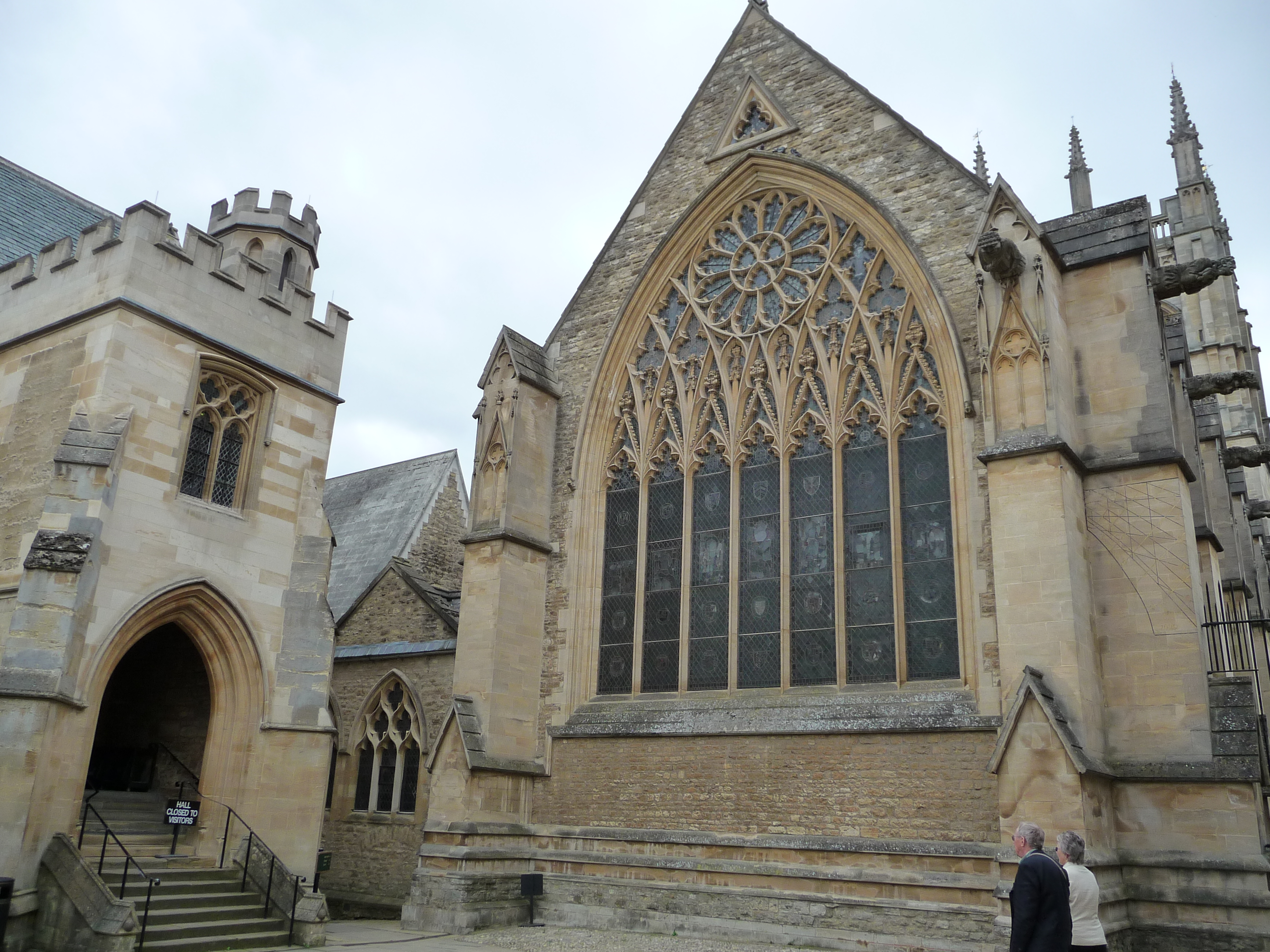
Merton College Chapel viewed from Front Quad

== See also ==
- Merton College Library
- Mob Quad at Merton

== Bibliography ==
- Henderson, Bernard William, Merton College, (1899). Retrieved 9 February 2010
- Highfield, J. R. L., and Martin, G. H., A History of Merton College, Oxford. Oxford (1997).
- Parker, John Henry, An Introduction to the Study of Gothic Architecture. London; Parker and Co. (1891) Retrieved 9 February 2010
