= William Reade (bishop) =

14th-century Bishop of Chichester

- Bishop of Chichester
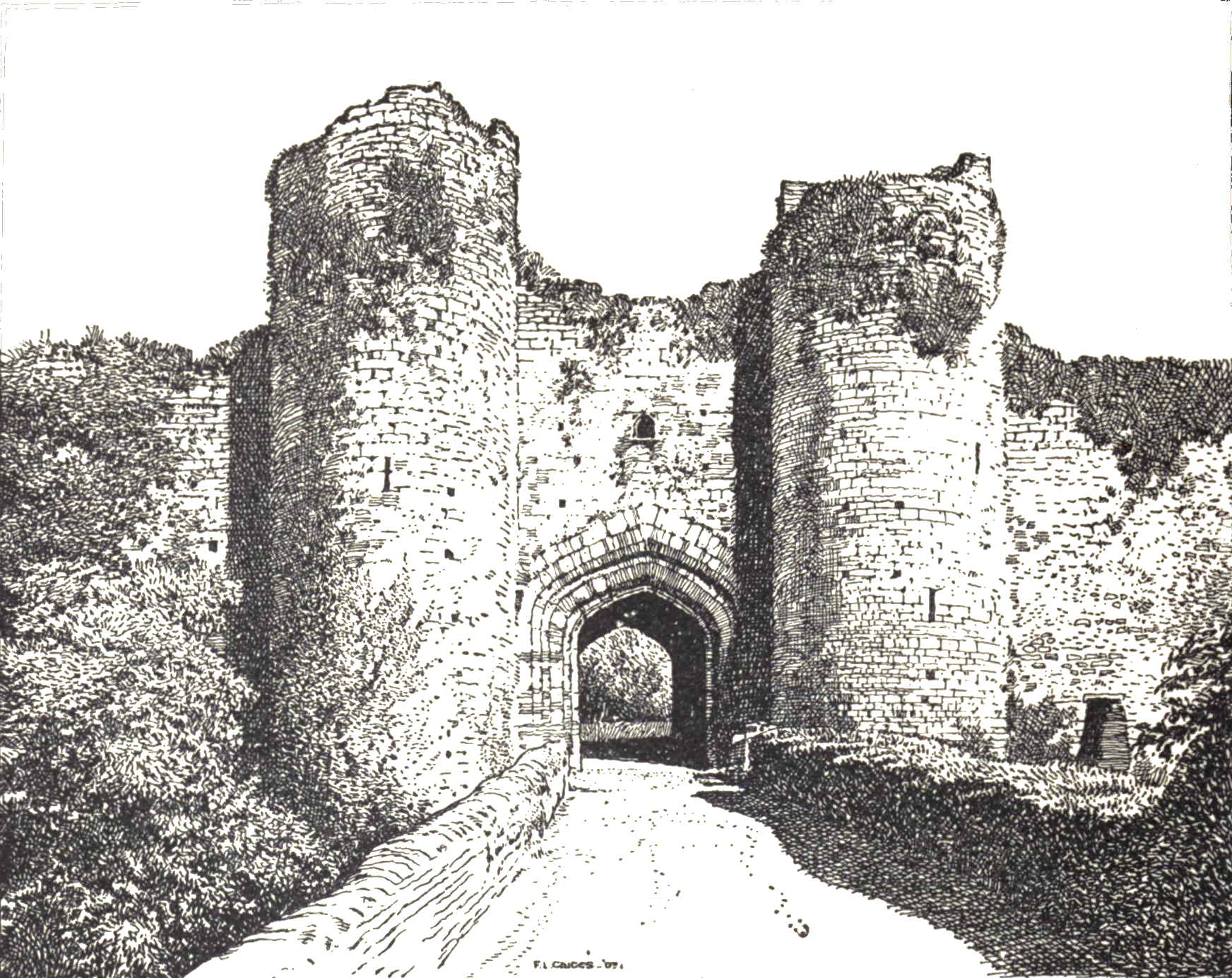
- Amberley Castle
- Appointed: 23 September 1368
- Term ended: 18 August 1385
- Predecessor: William Lenn
- Successor: Thomas Rushock

Personal details
- Born: About 1315 Wyngerworthy, Derby, England
- Died: 18 August 1385
- Denomination: Catholic

William Reade or William Rede (Note: Also known as William Reed.) (c.1315–1385) was a medieval bishop, theologian and astronomer.

== Education ==
Reade was initially brought up, from boyhood to maturity, by his friend and protégé Nicholas of Sandwich. He was then educated at Exeter College, Oxford where astronomy, mathematics, and natural philosophy (Note: The philosophical study of physics. It was dominant before the development of modern science.) flourished. Reade's career at Oxford is unclear, but he was probably studying there from 1337. He was a fellow at Merton College from around 1347 until 1357 at least, a second bursar in 1352-3 and sub-warden in 1353–54. There is some suggestion that he was also a fellow of Exeter College but there is no evidence to support this. He became a Doctor of Theology sometime before 1362.

== Career ==
In 1354 Reade was given letters dimissory, by the bishop of Exeter and moved to the diocese of Rochester, Kent. From the same year until 1356 he was successively subdeacon, deacon and priest in the Rochester diocese. He became archdeacon of Rochester in 1359 and provost of the college of Wingham, Kent in 1363. Then on 23 September 1368, he was nominated for Bishop of Chichester by provision of Pope Urban V, he was confirmed as bishop of Chichester on 2 September 1369 and vacated his post as provost of Wingham at the same time. He remained as bishop of Chichester until his death.

== Life ==
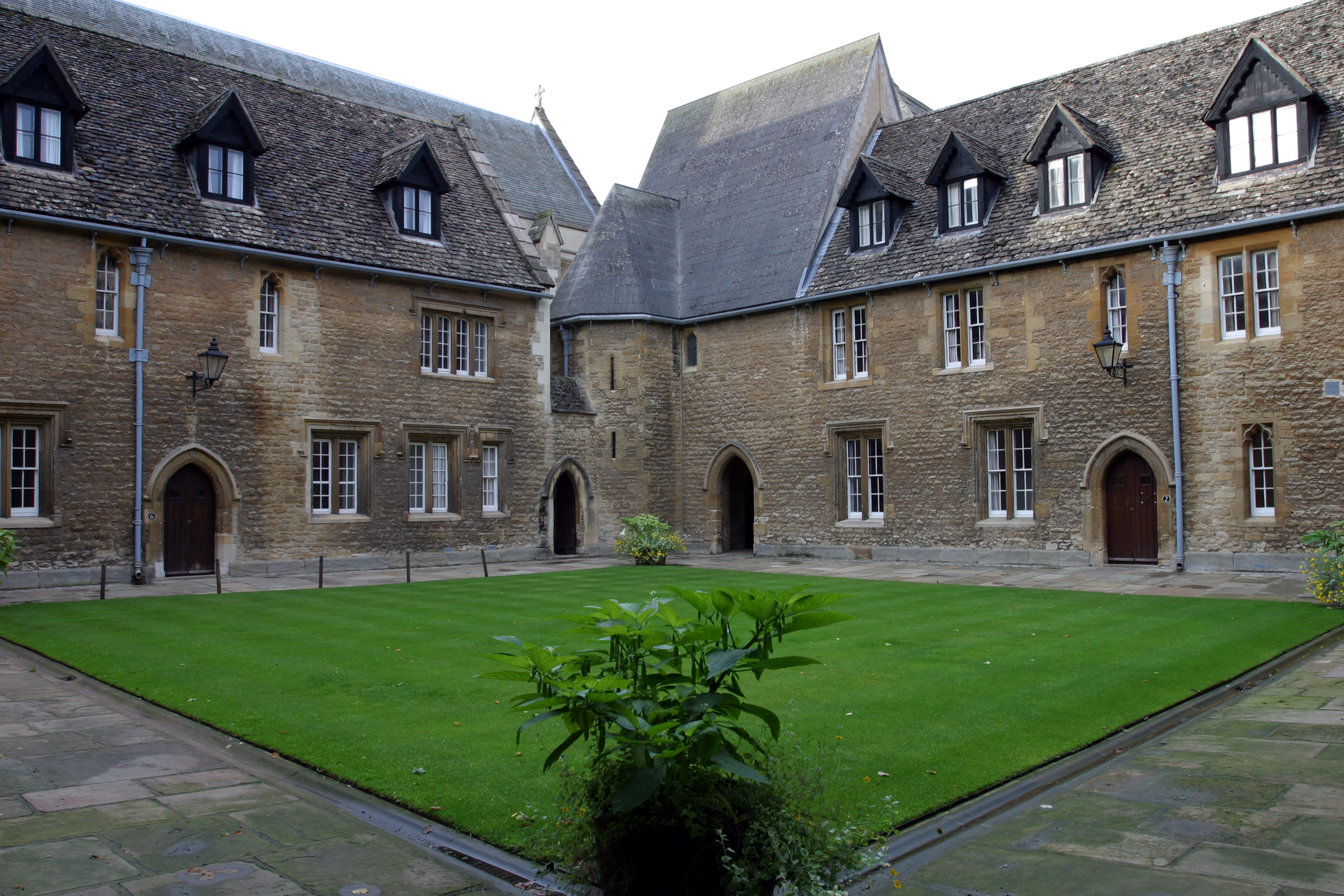
The Mob Quad group of buildings at Merton College, Oxford,

Reade was active in public life, but is better known for his collection of some 370 books. His private library was probably the biggest of its kind, in 14th century England and was larger than any of the Oxford colleges at that time. Reade donated and bequeathed some 250 volumes shared between the libraries at Merton, Exeter, Balliol, Oriel, Queen's, and New Colleges, Oxford. Reade also provided a large sum of money to build the Merton College Library. The building, although added to over the centuries, still exists and is known today as the Mob Quad.

Reade's books covered a wide range of subjects including theology, natural philosophy, astrology and astronomy. He is known in astronomical circles for his work on Alfonsine tables. He compiled a table of solar positions between the years 1341-1344 for the Oxford meridian.

=== Bishop of Chichester ===
Reade's contribution to Chichester Cathedral was the systematic compilation of cartularies, gathering together all the charters and writings concerning the church. His cartularies have preserved virtually the only early documentary evidence about the cathedral.

Reade converted the old Manor House at Amberley, into a castle. (Note: Reed was granted a Licence to Crenellate, Amberley in 1377.)The 19th century theologian and historian William Stephens says he did this "to provide a strong fortress for himself and his successors against troublous times." At the time the south coast of England was being made secure to prepare itself for an invasion by the French.

Reade held a deer park, in Selsey, that was plagued with poachers so much so, that the incensed bishop issued a decree excommunicating the offenders by "Bell, book, and candle", and he ordered that the ritual should be performed at all churches within the deanery. Reade died 18 August 1385, and asked in his will to be buried at Selsey parish church "once the cathedral church of my diocese...", then located at Church Norton, "...before the high altar". His wish was not acted upon as he was buried in Chichester Cathedral without monument. (Note: There is some supporting evidence that he was not buried at Selsey. The later prelate Robert Rede, requested, in his will, that he be buried at the foot of his predecessor William, before the high altar in Chichester.) It seems that this was not the only problem with the execution of his will as the dean and chapter, of Chichester Cathedral, petitioned the executors, thirteen years later, to account for the thirteen gilt cups, (Note: Reade bequeathed thirteen gilt cups, probably for the thirteen altars, then present in the cathedral.) bequeathed by Reade, for the use of the cathedral.

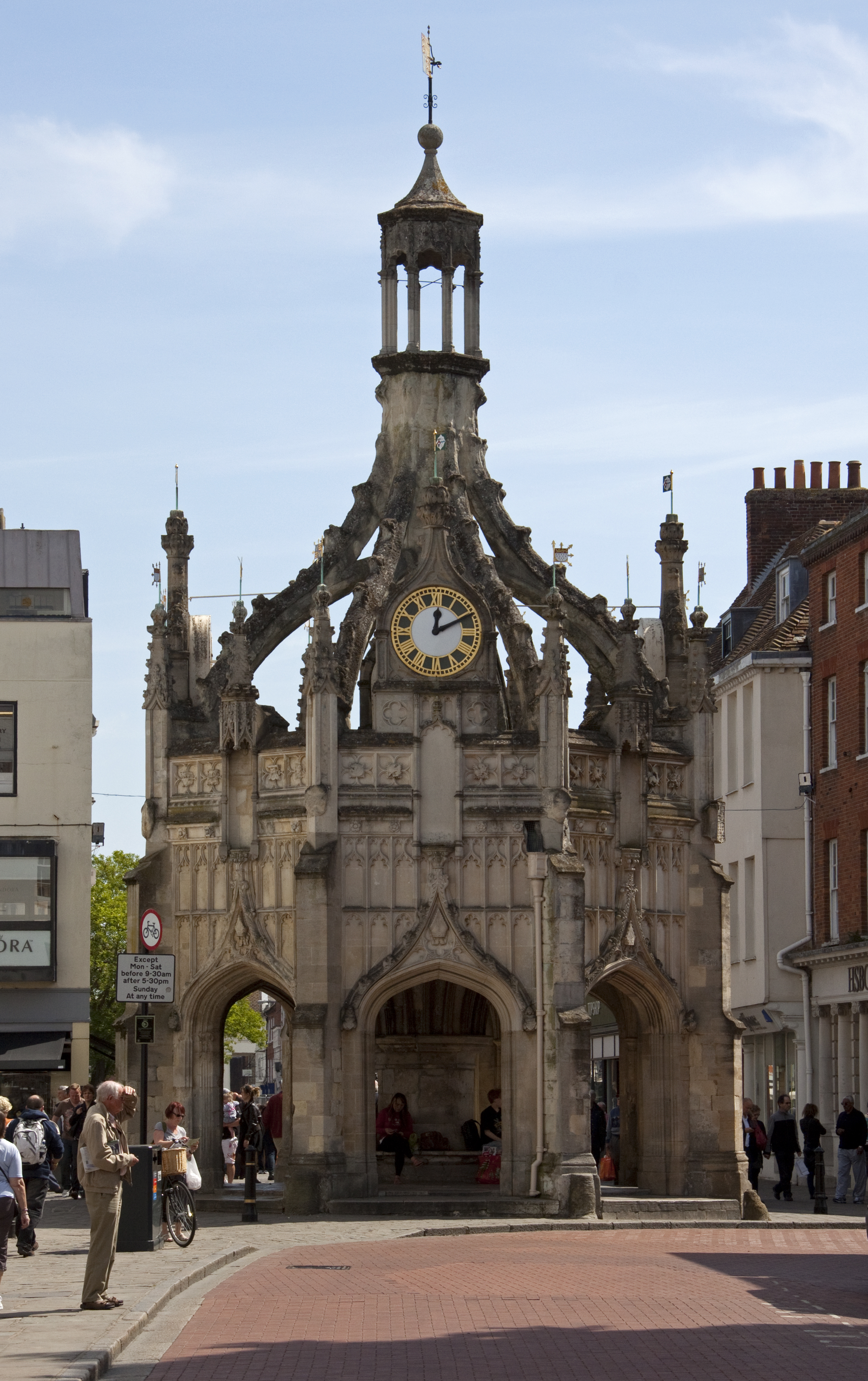
The Chichester Cross stands in the centre of Chichester, at the intersection of the four principal streets. It was built by Bishop Edward Story(1477 to 1503) and replaced an earlier wooden cross that had been erected by William Reade.

== Citations ==
Catholic Church titles
Preceded by William Lenn	Bishop of Chichester; 1368–1385	Succeeded by Thomas Rushock
