= Crichton Collegiate Church =

Church in Midlothian, Scotland

Coordinates: 55.8438°N 2.9902°W

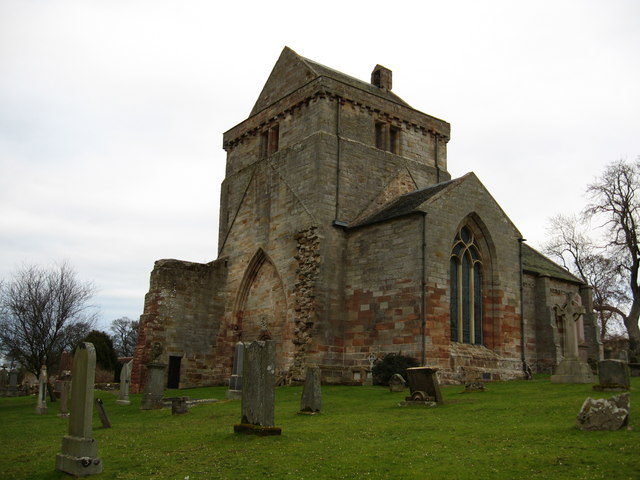
Crichton Collegiate Church

Crichton Collegiate Church is situated about 0.6 miles (0.97 km) south-west of the hamlet of Crichton in Midlothian, Scotland.

== Origins and Pre-Reformation ==
The site may have been the location of an old Christian shrine and about 1440 William Crichton, 1st Lord Crichton, Lord Chancellor of Scotland started to build a church there. On 26 December 1449, William Crichton, 1st Lord Crichton opened the church "Out of thankfullness and gratitude to Almighty God, our Lord Jesus Christ, the Blessed Virgin Mary, St. Kentigern and All Saints", with the consent of his son, James of Frendraucht and confirmed on the 29 December by James Kennedy, Bishop of St Andrews. Like many other collegiate churches, Crichton was built for the use of the local lord, and a Provost, eight Prebendaries, two choir boys and a Sacrist were appointed to pray for the souls of the Crichton family. The Provost was granted the tiends and tithes of the prebends, the Rectory of Crichton and the Temple lands appertaining to Crichton.

The church was built in a Gothic and Romanesque cruciform style with a large central tower; the nave was used as the place of worship for the poor people. However the Crichton family supported the claimant Alexander Stewart, Duke of Albany, in the 15th century, fell out of favour with the Scottish Crown and the Crichton lands were forfeited. During the Scottish Reformation of 1560 the glass was taken from the windows, the floor converted back to earth and the medieval stone tracery destroyed. The chancel roof was still extant but the church was a ruin and considered unusable for services.

== Post Reformation ==
By 1569 it was being used as the parish kirk (church) and a minister, Adam Johnston, was ordained to lead the service. By the 1580s, major restoration work began, though the nave was said to be ruinous, as it is to this day. In 1641, by an Act of Parliament, Crichton Church was declared to be the parish church for all time. Though there was more restoration and adaptation in 1729 it was considered to have been carried out "badly". More work in the 1820s helped to bring the old church back to life, but it was not until the end of the 19th century that the church was fully restored, by the Edinburgh architects Hardy & Wright. Stained glass windows made by the Edinburgh company Ballantine and Gardener (1898), new oak pews and a pipe organ built by the Glasgow company Joseph Brook were installed (1899). The Church of Scotland closed the church in 1992 and the Crichton Collegiate Church Trust acquired the property. The Trust restored the organ, stained glass windows, lighting, walls, roof and the tower in 1998.

== Post Reformation Ministers ==
- 1569 Adam Johnston
- 1639 Gideon Penman
- 1682 Andrew Donn
- 1690 Matthew Selkirk
- 1729 Charles Primrose
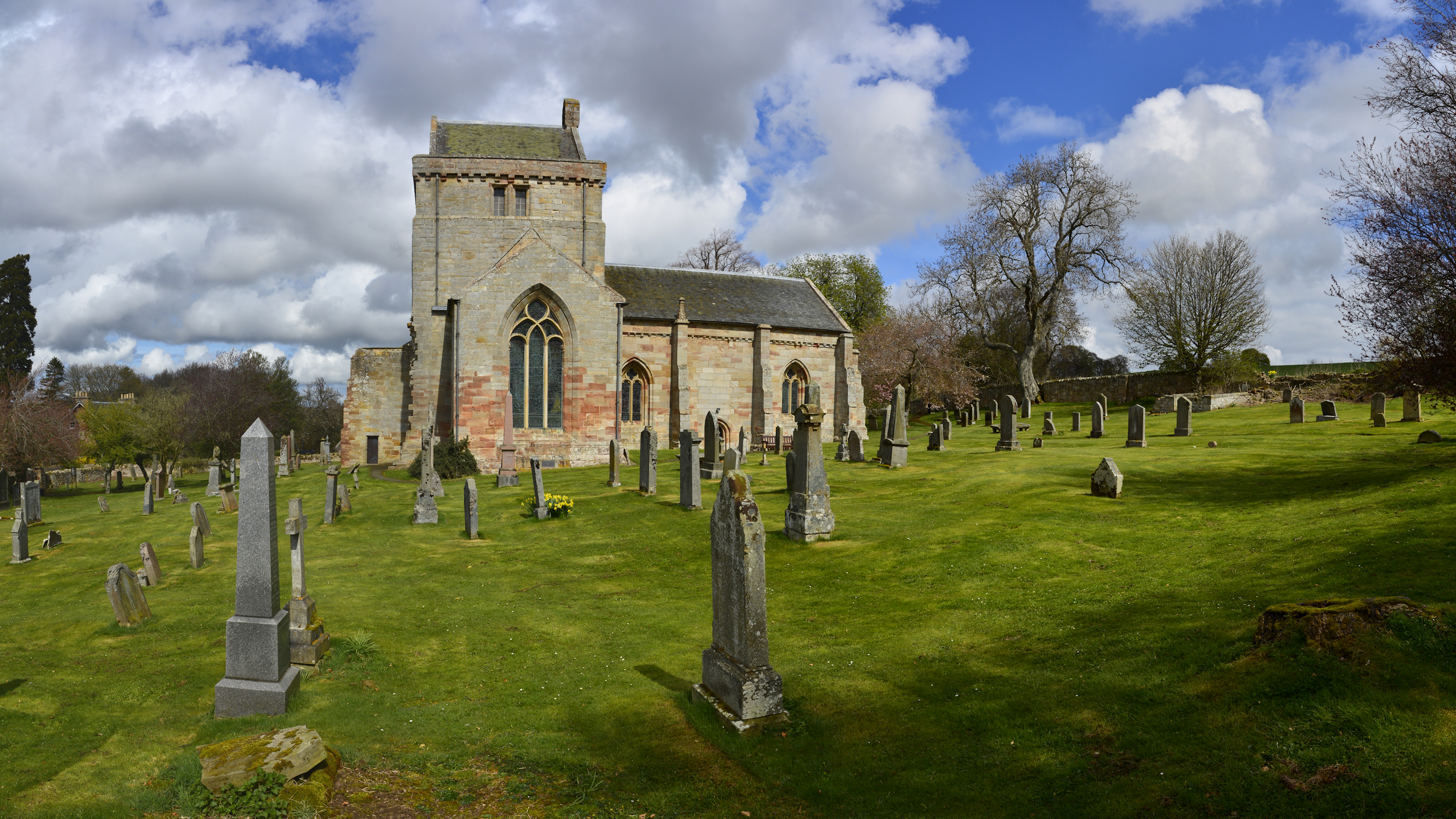
viewed from the corner of the graveyard

== Today ==
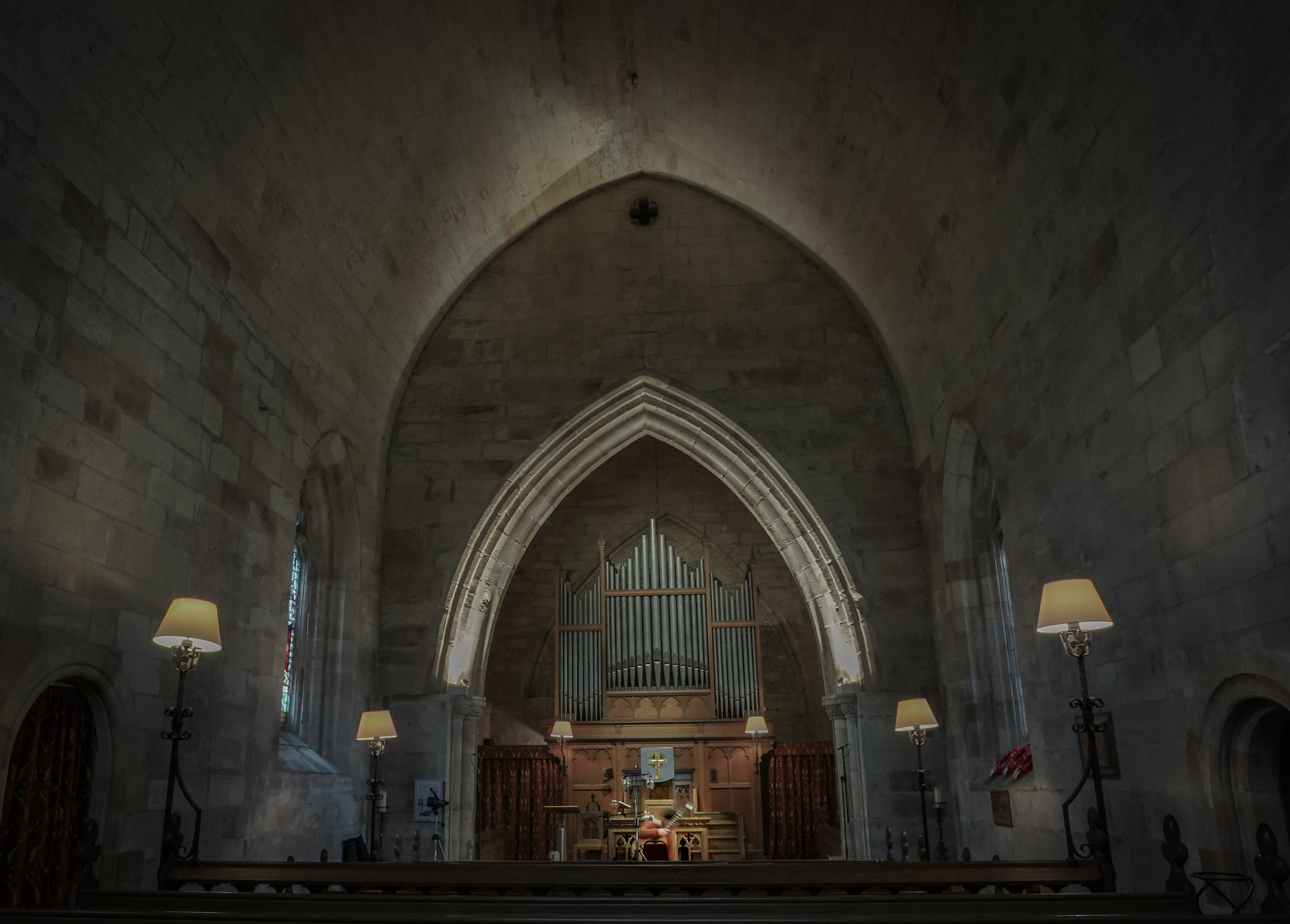
Sean Shibe records with Delphian Records in Crichton Church

The T-shaped remains are no longer used as a parish church by the Church of Scotland and is in the care of the Crichton Collegiate Church Trust based in nearby Pathhead. It is used for Christian weddings and funerals, instrumental and choral concerts, other cultural events and is available for visiting. Edinburgh-based classical record label Delphian Records use the Church for many of their recordings, notably those of The Marian Consort and guitarist Sean Shibe. The church is used for inter-denominational services about six times a year. Crichton is category A listed building.

== Location ==
Crichton itself is 1.4 miles (2.3 km) west of Pathhead and 7.5 miles (12.1 km) south of Scotland's capital city, Edinburgh. The church is reached by leaving the A68 road at the north end of Pathhead and turning on to the B6367 minor road at Crichton on a single-track lane signposted Crichton Castle. Before reaching the castle car park, on the left, is the church, situated at grid reference NT381616.

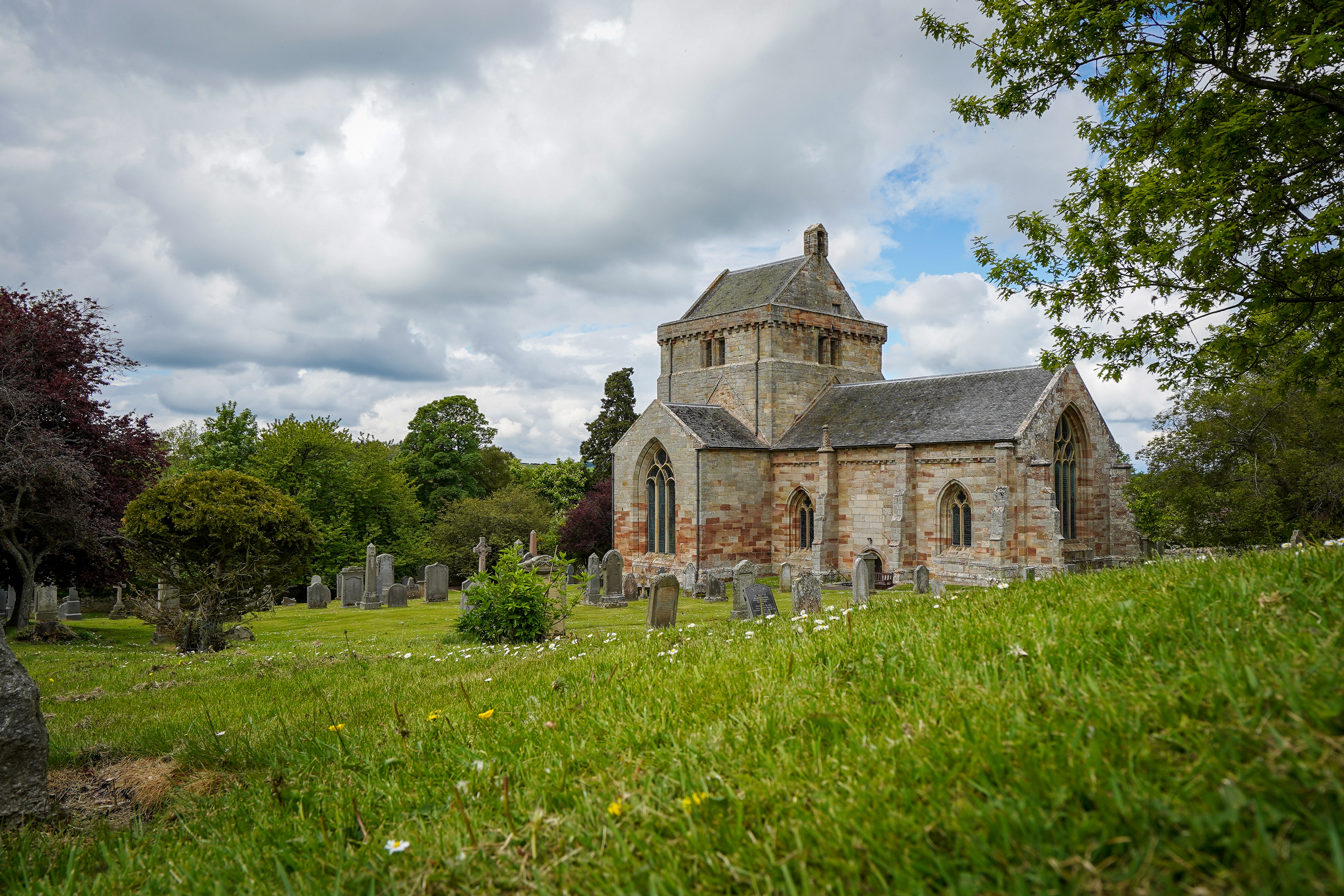
