= Shibe =

Shibe may refer to:

== People ==
- Ben Shibe (1838–1922), American sporting goods and baseball executive
- Sean Shibe (born 1992), Japanese-Scottish guitarist

== Places ==
- Shibe Park, a former baseball stadium in Philadelphia, Pennsylvania, US

== Other ==
- A name for the Shiba Inu, a Japanese dog breed
