= Samantha Crawford (soprano) =

Australian-British opera singer

Samantha Crawford is a British-Australian soprano recognized for her performances on the opera, oratorio, and concert stages.

== Operatic career ==
Her repertoire covers both traditional and modern pieces, with roles such as:

- Sieglinde and Ortlinde in Wagner's Die Walküre
- Elisabeth in Wagner's Tannhäuser
- Santuzza in Pietro Mascagni's Cavalleria rusticana
- Rosalinde in Johann Strauss's Die Fledermaus
- Agathe in Carl Maria von Weber Der Freischütz
- Miss Jessel in Benjamin Britten's The Turn of the Screw
- Mrs. Coyle in Benjamin Britten's Owen Wingrave
- Donna Anna in Mozart's Don Giovanni
- Contessa Almaviva in Mozart's Le nozze di Figaro
- Ofglen in Poul Ruders's The Handmaid's Tale
- Regan in Michael Tippett's New Year

She has worked with opera companies including the English National Opera (ENO), Glyndebourne, Scottish Opera, Teatro Real Madrid, the Aldeburgh Festival and the Edinburgh Festival. Productions include Robert Carsen's Die Walküre and Claus Guth's Parsifal at Teatro Real, both of which were broadcast across Spain and filmed.

== Concert career ==
In addition to her opera work, Crawford has performed in concert halls such as Wigmore Hall, Royal Albert Hall, Barbican Centre, Hong Kong City Hall, and Schlosstheater Schönbrunn. Her concert repertoire includes:

- Verdi's Requiem
- Mendelssohn's Elijah
- Richard Strauss's Vier letzte Lieder
- Vaughan Williams's A Sea Symphony

== Recordings and recent work ==
In 2023, Crawford released her debut album, dream.risk.sing: elevating women's voices, on Delphian Records. The album includes pieces by Charlotte Bray, Libby Larsen, and Judith Weir, including the world premiere recording of Bray's Crossing Faultlines, a song cycle that explores women's experiences in the workplace. Supported by Arts Council England and the RVW Trust, the album was described as "one of the most arresting recording debuts" by Presto Music.

In 2024, Crawford created Freedom Cries Out, a program centered around stories of displacement and refugees. The project includes the world premiere of Raymond Yiu's specially commissioned song cycle, and the UK premiere of Shawn Okpebholo's Words Like Freedom. The premiere is set for November 2024 at the St. Marylebone Festival in London.

=== Awards and recognition ===
During her studies, she received numerous awards, including the Golden Medal with Honours at the Julian Baring Award (2017), the Berlin International Music Competition Gold Medal (2017), the NSW Wagner Society Award for Emerging Wagner Singers (2017/18), and was honored with first prize at the Wagner Society Singing Competition (London, 2016).

== Personal life ==
Crawford is married to Matthew Crawford; they have two daughters. Her father, Shorland Hosking, died in a plane crash in 2010.
