= Dobson Pipe Organ Builders =

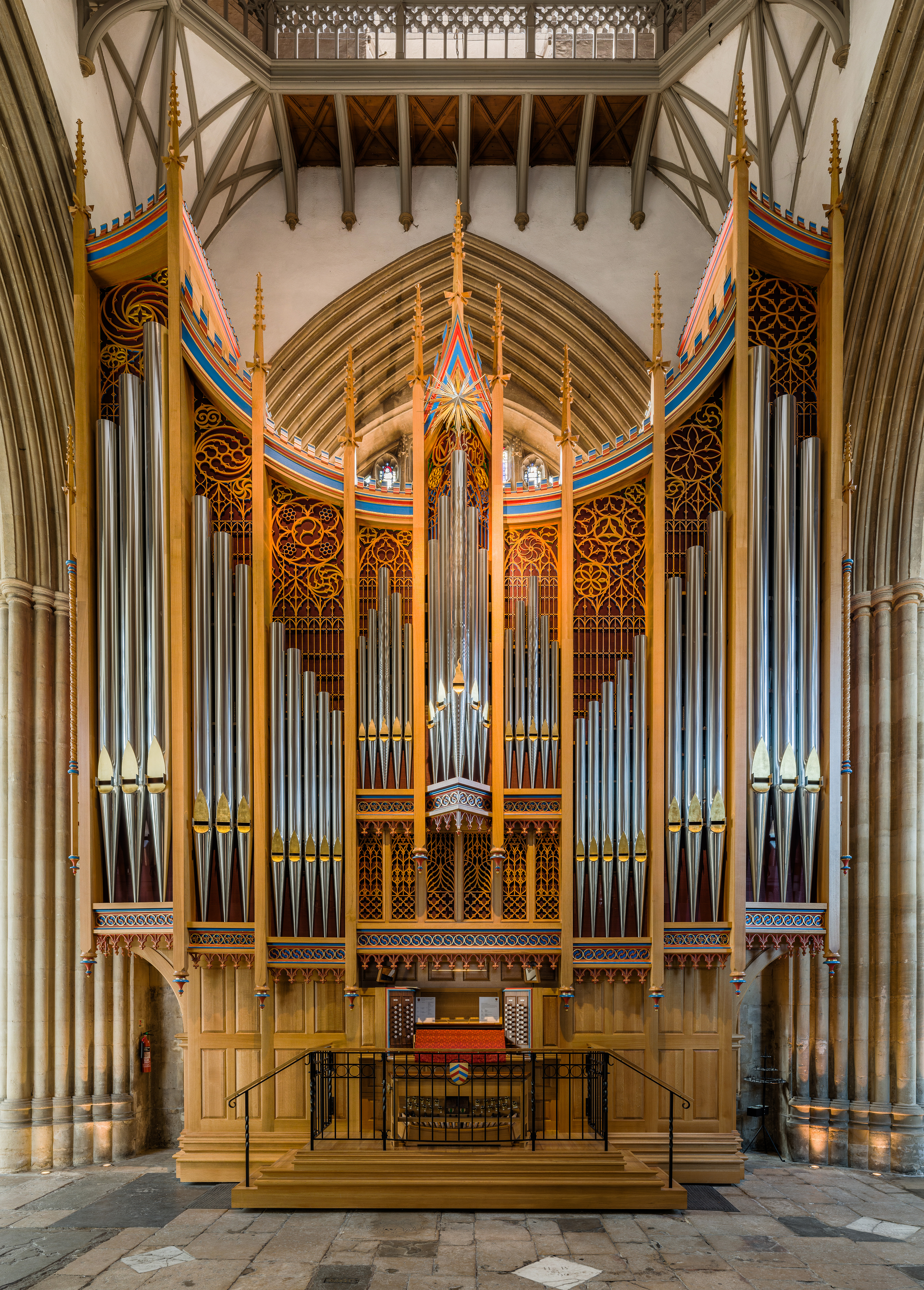
The organ of Merton College Chapel, Oxford (2013)

Dobson Pipe Organ Builders is a manufacturer of pipe organs based in Lake City, Iowa.

The company was founded in 1974 by Iowa native Lynn A. Dobson, who served as President and Artistic Director until his retirement in February, 2020, when long-time colleague John A. Panning assumed ownership. The company employs 18, and has produced almost 100 new instruments. It has also restored a number of historic organs, and tunes and maintains a variety of instruments in the upper Midwest.

First known for the construction of mechanical action organs, the company has since the 1990s also undertaken the construction of organs with electric actions, most employing slider windchests. Notable instruments built by Dobson include the organ at the Cathedral of Our Lady of the Angels in Los Angeles, California (which includes some pipes retained from the organ of the former St. Vibiana's Cathedral), and the organ for the Kimmel Center for the Performing Arts in Philadelphia, Pennsylvania, the home of the Philadelphia Orchestra.

Major church installations include a 95-rank organ installed at Highland Park United Methodist Church, Dallas, Texas, in 2009, and an 84-rank instrument installed at Independent Presbyterian Church, Birmingham, Alabama in 2012. In 2013, Dobson completed a new mechanical action instrument for Merton College Chapel, making the firm one of a very few American organ builders to send its work to England. In 2018, Dobson completed a 126-rank instrument for Saint Thomas Church in New York City; it is the largest instrument built by the firm. In early 2021, the Dobson company completed a 51-rank organ having more than 3,000 pipes for the John and Alice Butler Hall at the University of Dubuque. The organ's dedicatory recital was held on April 6, 2021.

A major fire on June 15, 2021, resulted in the destruction of the company's Lake City, Iowa, plant. One Dobson employee was injured attempting to extinguish the blaze. The four-manual organ under construction for St James' Church, Sydney, Australia, at the time of the conflagration was a total loss and the company personnel were reported to be “heartbroken” by the devastation. On February 28, 2022, Dobson announced plans to build a new facility designed by ASK Studio of Des Moines on its old site. Dobson continued operations and resumed construction of the Sydney organ in rented workshop spaces while its new building was designed and built. On July 5, 2023, the firm broke ground for its new facility, and opened it with a ribbon cutting on September 17, 2024. One month later, Dobson held an open house attended by over 700 people. The firm resumed operations at 200 North Illinois Street with an instrument, Dobson’s 100th new organ, for the Curtis Institute of Music being the first constructed in the new workshop.
