= Merton College Library =

Library in Merton College, Oxford, England

Coordinates: 51.7507°N 1.2525°W

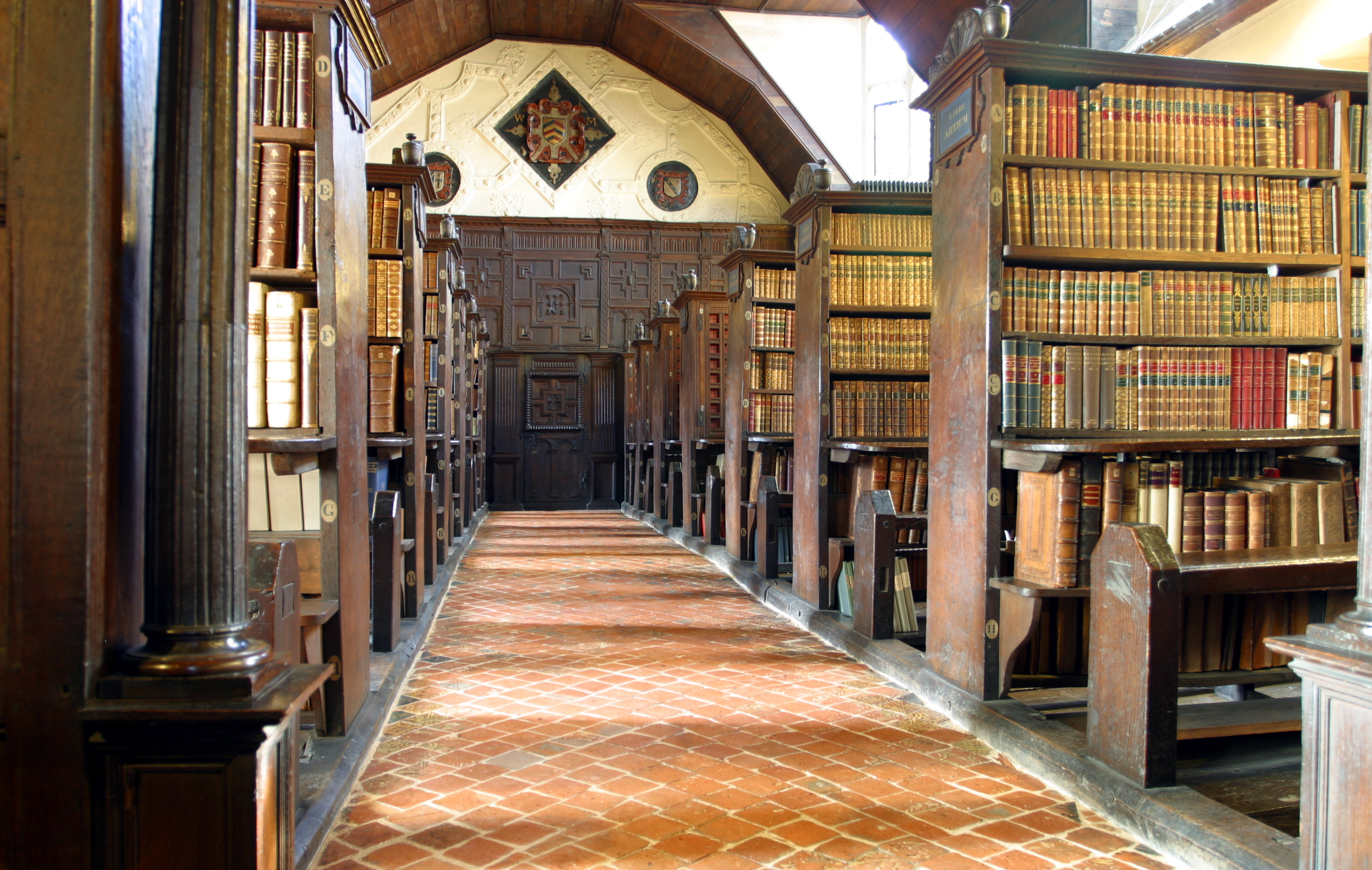
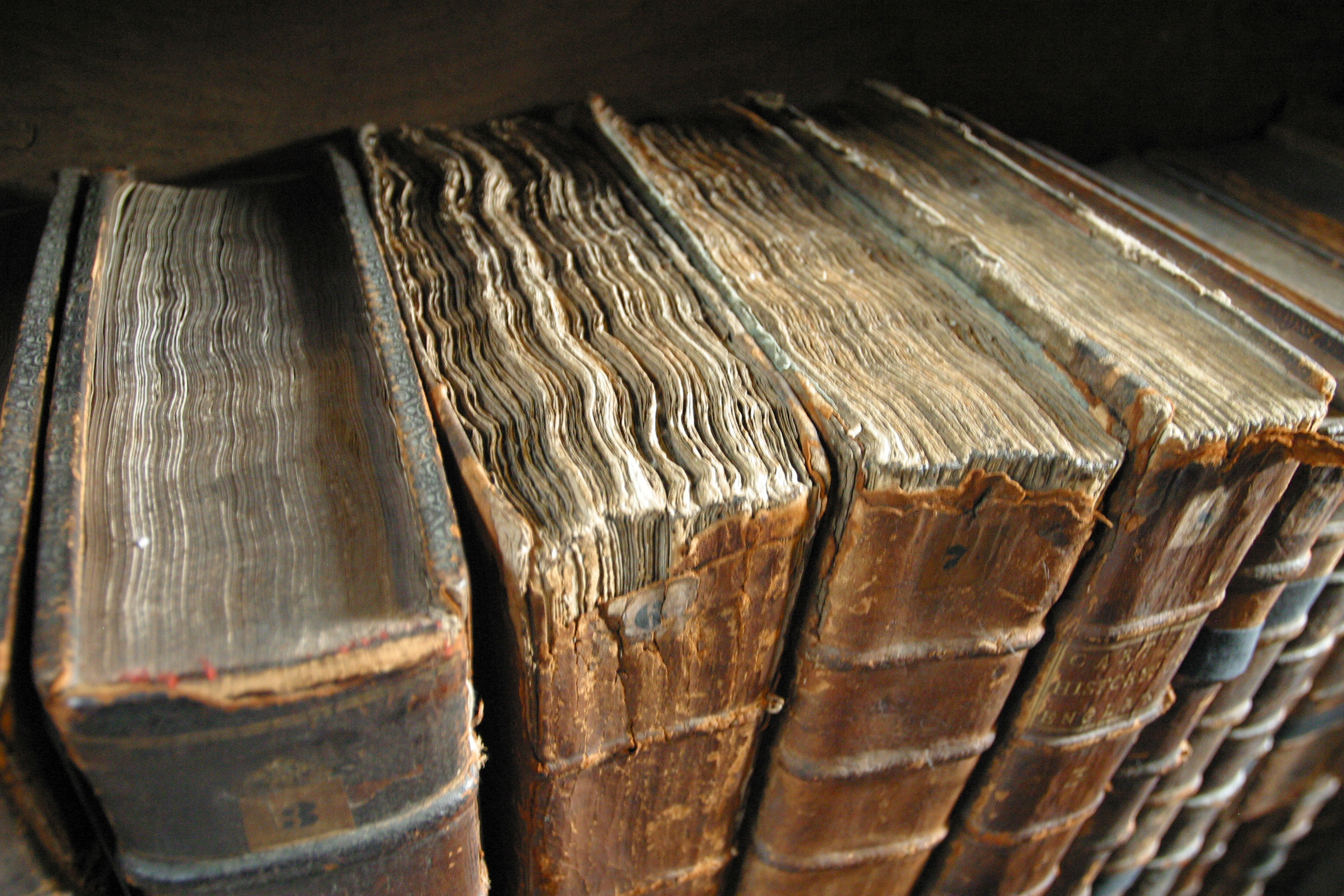
- Location: Merton College, Oxford, United Kingdom
- Type: Academic library
- Established: 1276

Collection
- Items collected: Books, journals, maps, drawings and manuscripts
- Size: Approximately 70,000 items

Other information
- Website: Merton College Library

Merton College Library (in Merton College, Oxford) is one of the earliest libraries in England and one of the oldest academic libraries in the world still in continuous daily use. The library is located in several parts of the college, and houses a priceless collection of early printed books and more than 300 medieval manuscripts. The historic collection was initially built through benefactions, including manuscripts donated by the medieval clergyman William Reade. The library also contains early printed books from the personal libraries of Griffin Higgs and Henry Kent, who originally donated approximately 600 and 800 volumes respectively. The main collection runs to approximately 70,000 volumes.

The oldest part, known as the Upper Library, is on the first floor of two orthogonal ranges of buildings that were built around 1373 by William Humberville as part of the completion of Mob Quad, one of the first collegiate quadrangles.

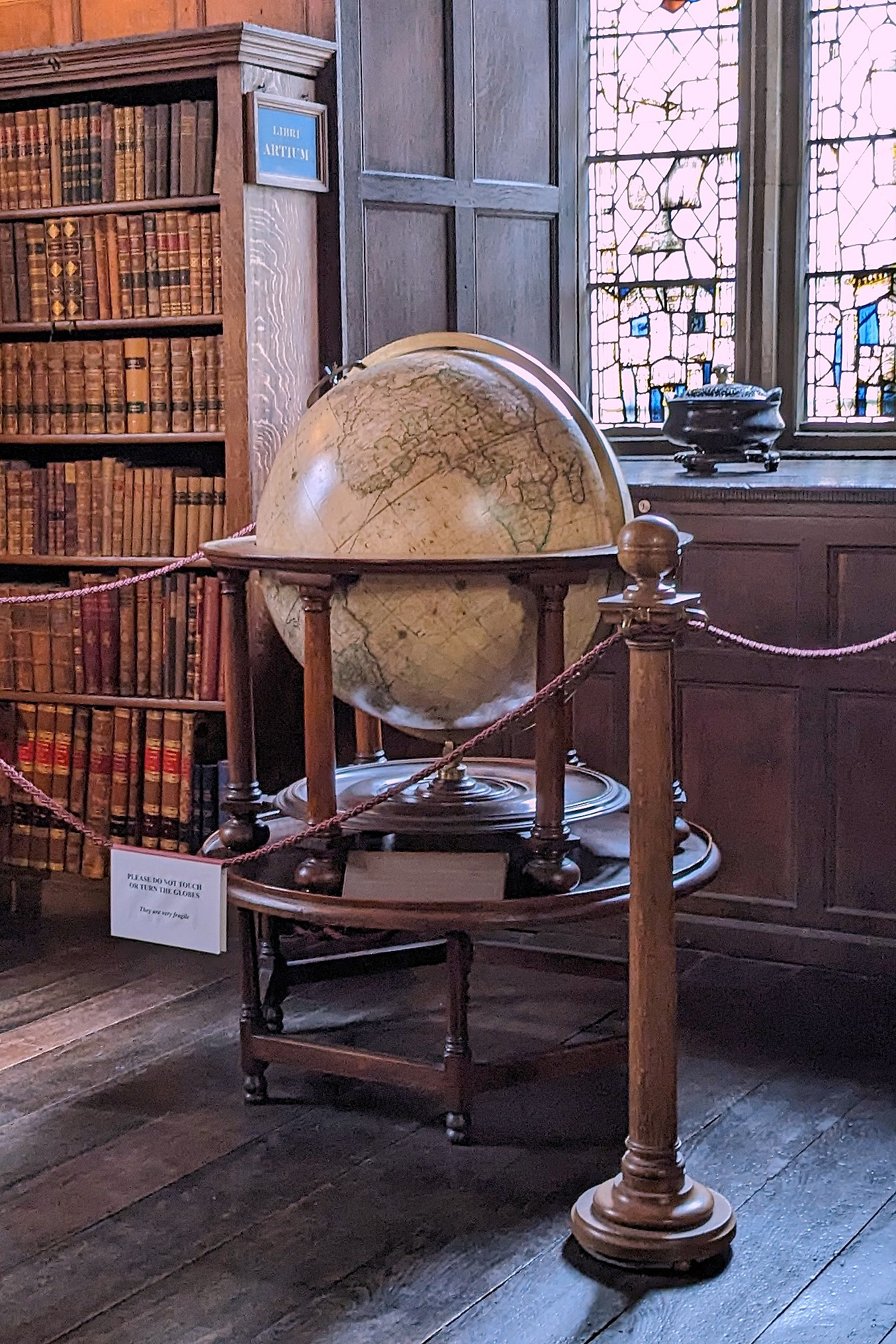
Mid-eighteenth terrestrial globe

The Upper Library was improved in the 16th century under Warden Sir Henry Savile. Large dormer windows were added to the roof to allow more light in, and Thomas Bodley reorganized it in the new Continental style; the old book chests and lecterns were replaced by bookshelves — among the first to be used in England — with benches between them. The Upper Library still retains these 16th-century fittings.

It also contains a number of book chests, some chained books, one of Elizabeth I's Welsh Bibles, a matching pair of 16th-century globes (one of the earth, the other of the heavens), and a collection of astrolabes and other early scientific instruments. Although the main academic library is housed elsewhere, the Upper Library is still regularly used by members of the college and is open to visitors by arrangement. The library also has important collections of papers and manuscripts from three former Mertonians: mountaineer Andrew "Sandy" Irvine and authors T. S. Eliot and Max Beerbohm.

The Library is mentioned in the 1925 novel The Great Gatsby written by American author F. Scott Fitzgerald, where the young and mysterious millionaire Jay Gatsby claims to be an "Oxford man".

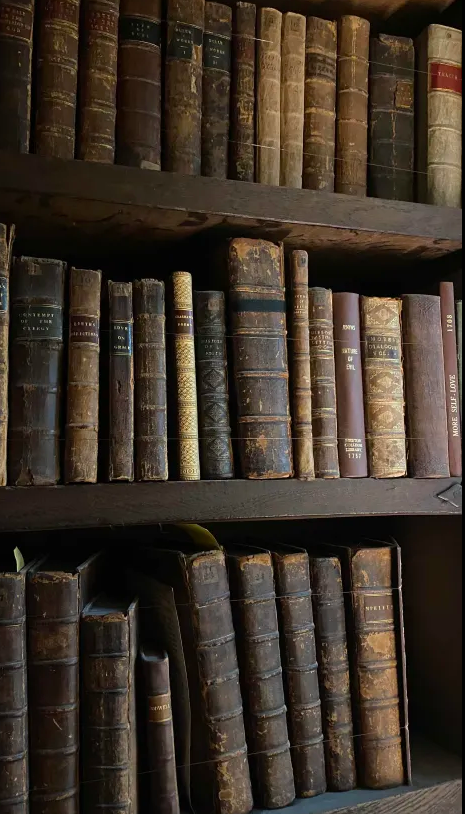
Shelves of books inside Merton College Library, 2025

Merton College Library was a pioneer in placing books in an upright position rather than horizontally.

== See also ==
- Merton College, Oxford
- Mob Quad
- Merton College Chapel
