= East Neuk Festival =

Annual music festival in Fife, Scotland

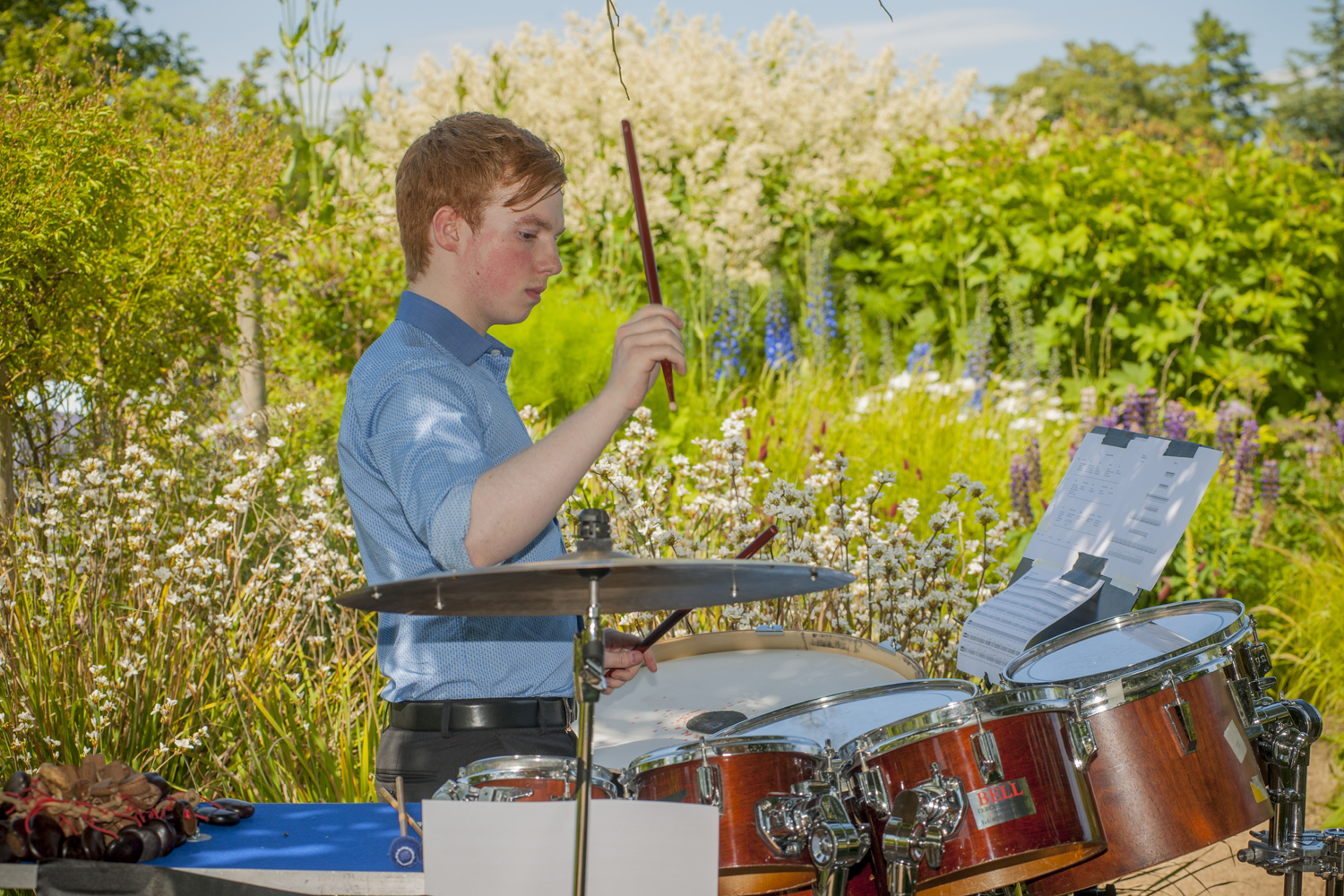
Inuksuit performed in Cambo Gardens at ENF 2013

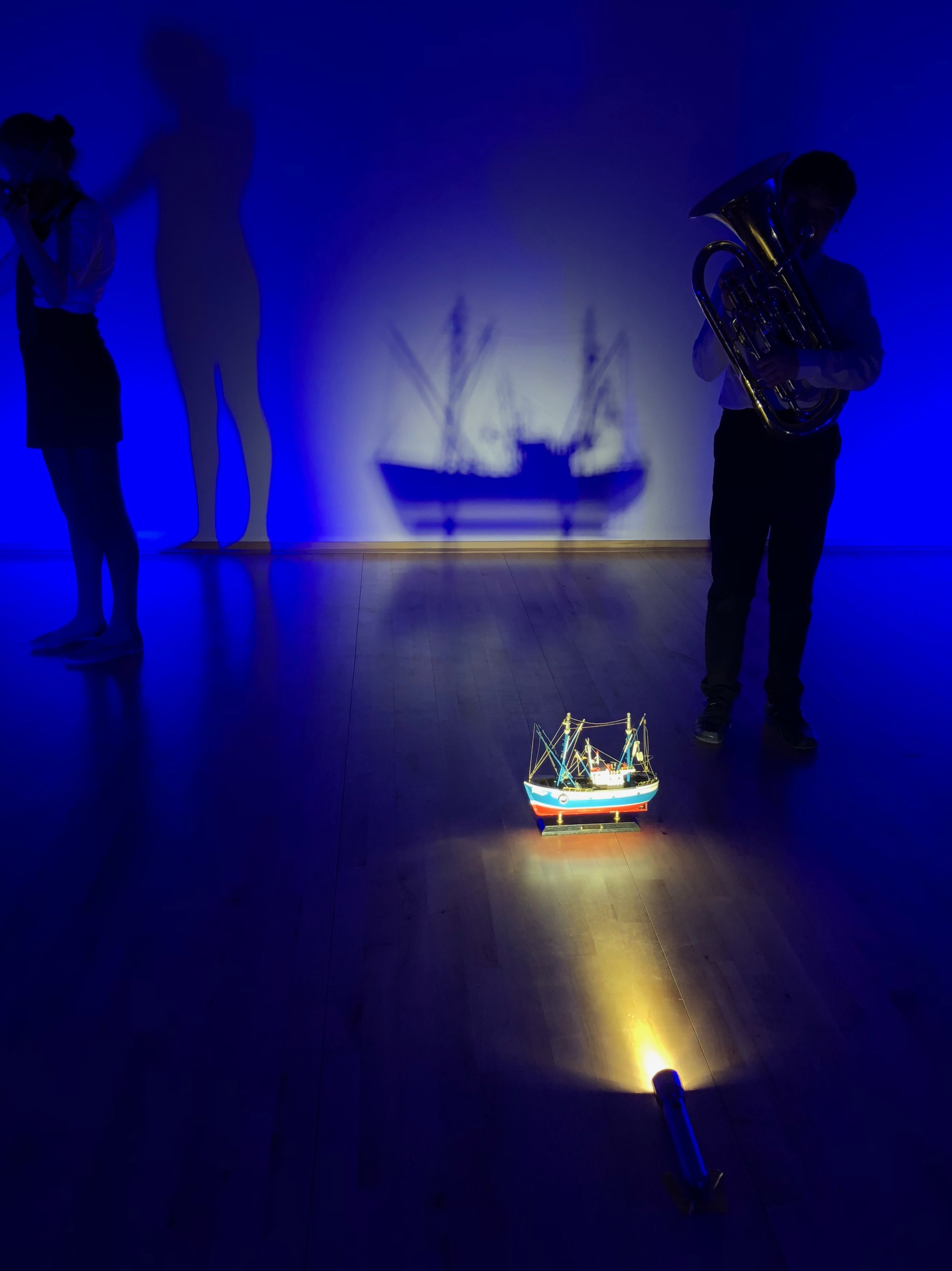
Performance of Lost at Sea, the Big Project 2018

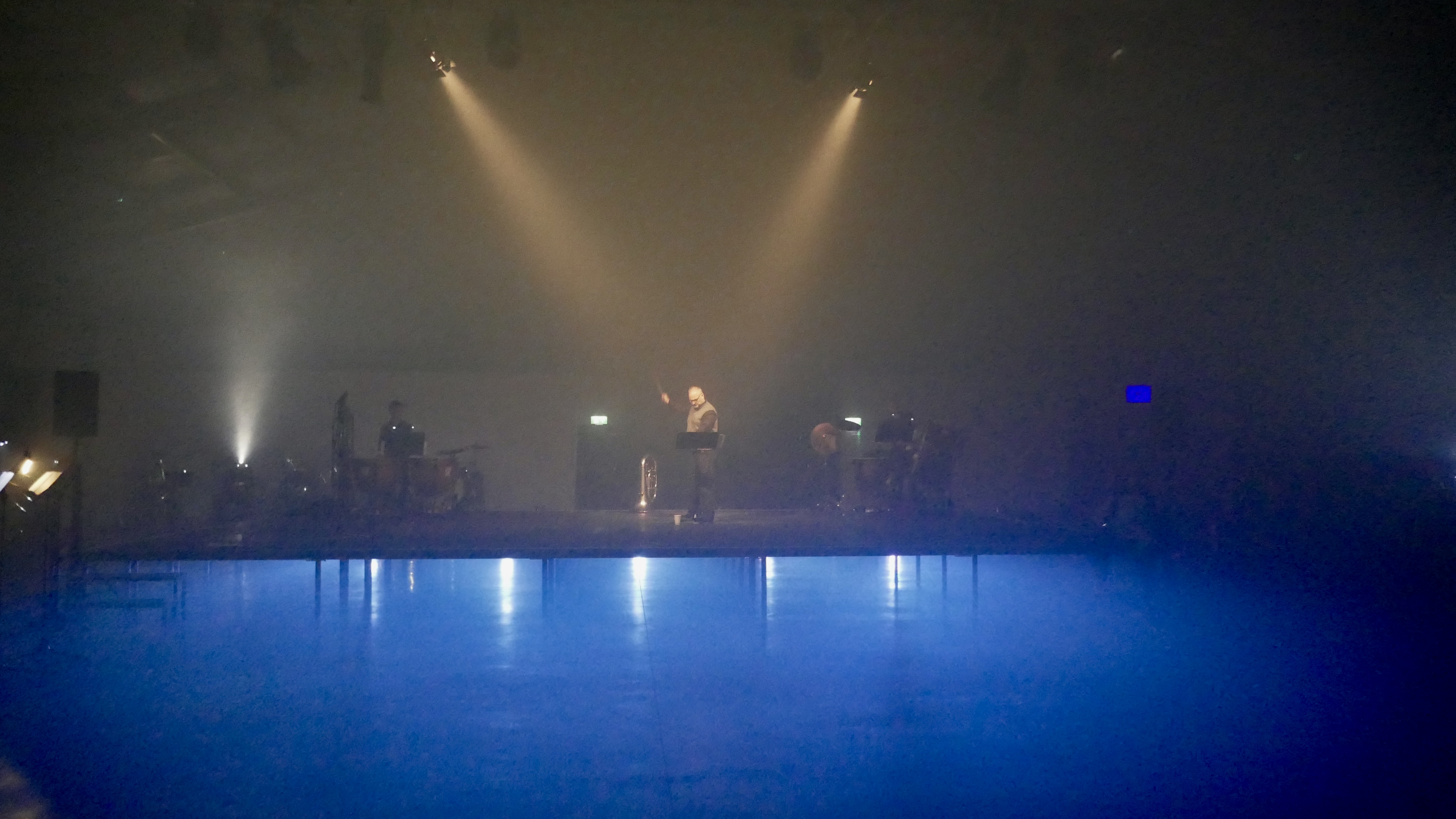
Tony George rehearsing De Profundis at ENF 2017

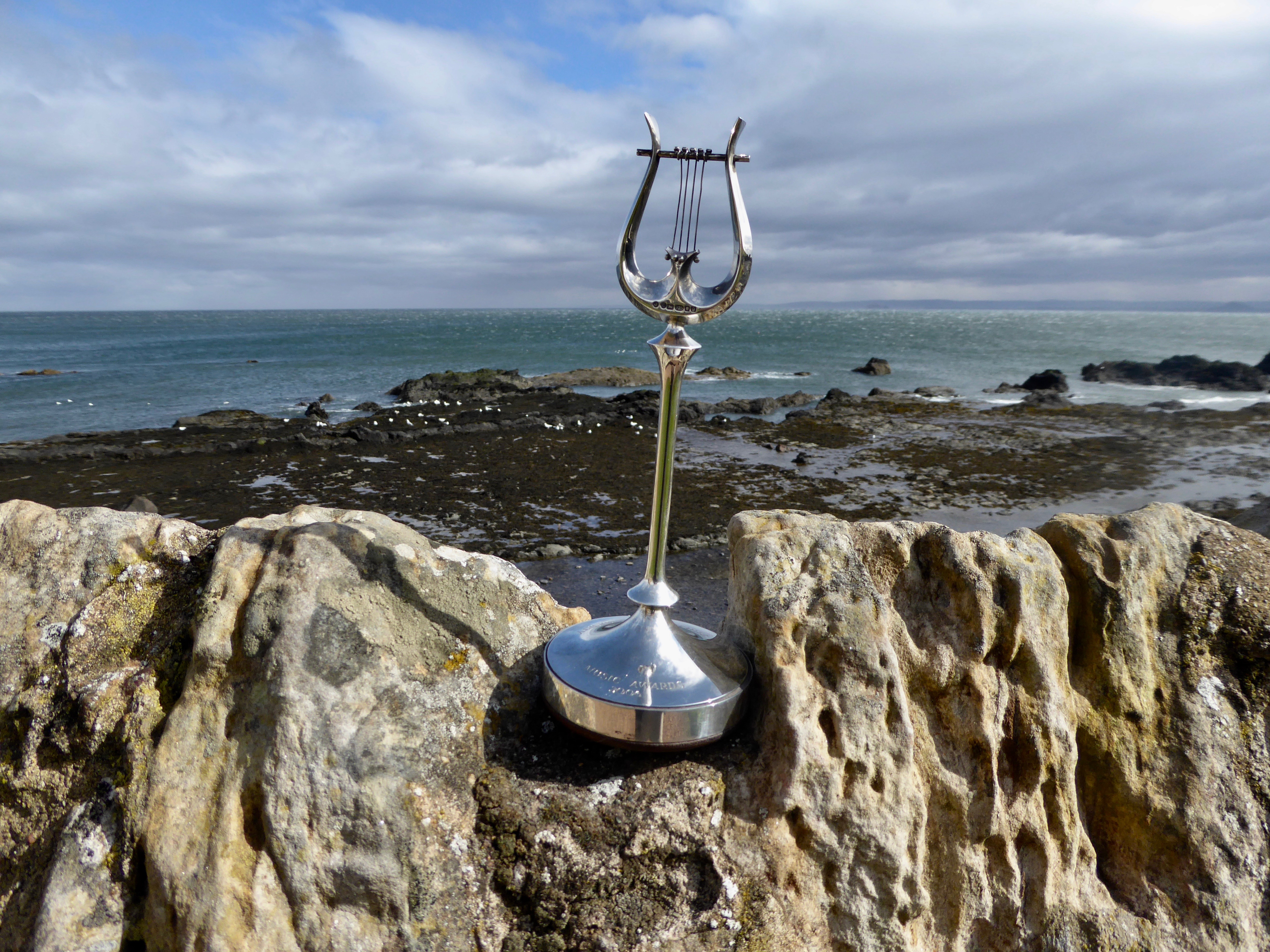
RPS Award for Audience Development 2017

The East Neuk Festival is an annual music festival that takes place over five days around 1 July in the area known as the East Neuk of Fife.

== History ==
Established in 2004 it was the brainchild of Donald and Louise MacDonald and founding artistic director Svend McEwan-Brown.

== Venues and Artists ==
The festival concerts take place in a range of venues including churches in villages such as St Monans, Crail, Kilconquhar, Kilrenny and Cellardyke as well as unusual spaces such as Scotland's Secret Bunker an aircraft shelter at RAF Leuchars, gardens, caves, dells, local attractions and notably, The Bowhouse, a centre for food production and promotion on the Balcaskie Estate which is transformed into a performance venue especially for the event.

Musicians and ensembles join together in residencies for practically the duration of the festival playing core chamber music repertoire alongside new commissions, contemporary works, jazz and world music. Storytelling, poetry, literature, exhibitions, films and other art and installation projects also feature.

Regular guest artists include the Scottish Chamber Orchestra, conductor/pianist Christian Zacharias, the Belcea Quartet, the Pavel Haas Quartet, the Castalian Quartet, Leipzig String Quartet, The Tallis Scholars, pianists Elisabeth Leonskaja and Llŷr Williams.

The 2021 festival programme includes 7 live concerts, pop up events throughout the area, installations and broadcasts online and on BBC Radio 3.

The 2022 Festival will take place 29 June - 3 July.

== East Neuk Festival Retreat ==
The Festival offers young artists special opportunities to develop their musicianship and projects in chamber music through its ENF Retreat programme. Retreat residencies and seminars culminate in performances at the festival but are primarily focused on the personal and musical development of the participant. The Retreat takes place in the village of Elie in Fife. In 2021 guitarist Sean Shibe explores guitar quartet repertoire, while violinist Benjamin Baker works towards the realisation of multimedia recital project entitled Sei Solo. Further residencies will be announced in July 2021

== Music and Community ==
ENF is committed to commissioning new works by major figures that are intended for performance by professional and community musicians side by side. The first work in this series was Across the Distance for 32 horns by John Luther Adams in 2015. In 2016 this was followed by David Lang's Memorial Ground for amateur and professional singers, a choral commemoration of the centenary of the Battle of the Somme. This was commissioned jointly by the East Neuk Festival and 14-18 NOW, with the support of Creative Scotland. Premiered on 2 July 2016, it was then made available for free to choirs to create their own performances, and more than 40 performances have taken place by April 2017. In 2017 ENF commissioned a devised performance with the musicians of the Tullis Russell Mills Band in Fife, led by trumpeter John Wallace and his The Wallace Collection musicians. Inspired by the stories of Fife's miners, and the music they made in their brass bands, it was called De Profundis and was premiered in Fife on 1 July 2017. 2018's commission saw Scanner work with students from Waid Academy, Anstruther to create a sound memorial to men lost at sea in the fishing industry.

== Awards ==
East Neuk Festival has twice been awarded the Royal Philharmonic Society Award for Audience Development - in 2007 and in 2017. In 2019 it won a Scottish Awards for New Music for its Big Project, Lost at Sea.
