= Sean Shibe =

Scottish guitarist (born 1992)

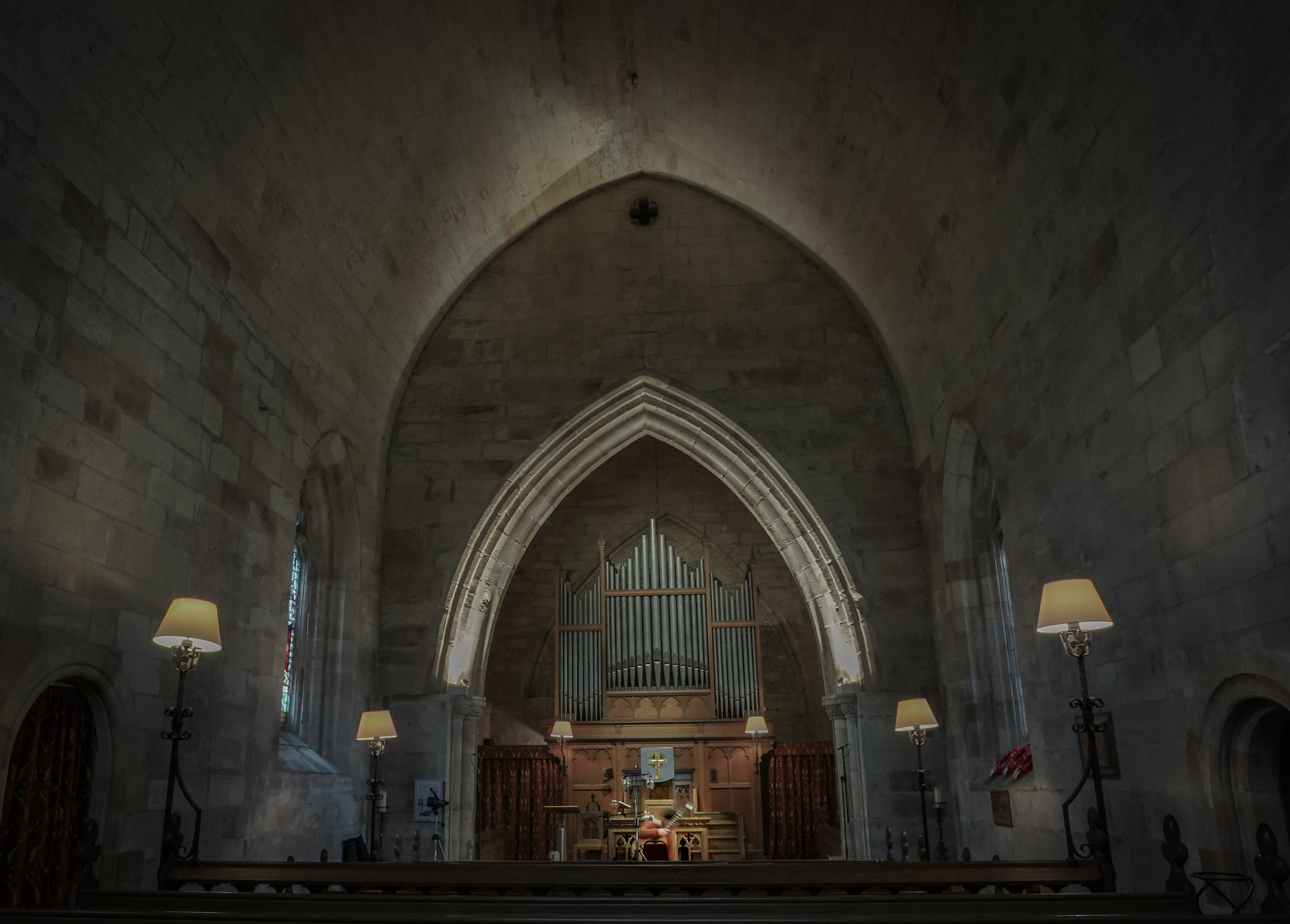
- Sean Shibe records with Delphian Records in Crichton Church

Background information
- Born: 1992 (age 33–34); Edinburgh, Scotland
- Genres: Classical
- Occupation: Guitarist
- Instruments: Classical Guitar, Electric Guitar, Lute
- Label: Pentatone
- Website: Official website

Sean Shibe (/ʃɔːn ˈʃiːbə/ shawn SHEE-bə; born 1992) is a classical and electric guitarist from Edinburgh, Scotland, of English and Japanese parentage. He studied at the Royal Conservatoire of Scotland (and was the youngest student to enter the then Royal Scottish Academy of Music and Drama) and to study with Italian guitarist Paolo Pegoraro. His debut album was described as "not just great guitar playing... the best [the jury] had ever heard" by BBC Music Magazine, and "the best solo guitar disc I've heard" by The Arts Desk.

Shibe also plays electric guitar, as on his 2018 album softLOUD, on which he performs Steve Reich's Electric Counterpoint, as well as electric guitar arrangements of works by David Lang and Julia Wolfe. Sean Shibe also performs Georges Lentz's epic, hour-long Ingwe for solo electric guitar.

Shibe also plays renaissance lute, performing 16th Century French repertoire at Baroque at the Edge, LSO St Luke's.

== Early life ==
Shibe was born in Edinburgh, Scotland, in 1992 to English and Japanese parents. He attended the City of Edinburgh Music School, as the only guitar student, until he was 14. He then moved to Aberdeen City Music School to study with Allan Neave before leaving at 16 to begin the Bachelor of Music course at the then Royal Scottish Academy of Music and Drama. He graduated in 2012 with first class honours.

== Career ==
Shibe has performed as soloist with the BBC Scottish Symphony Orchestra, Scottish Chamber Orchestra, BBC National Orchestra of Wales, BBC Symphony Orchestra, Trondheim Symphony Orchestra, Royal Northern Sinfonia and Sinfonia Viva. He has performed at the Brighton Festival, Aldeburgh Festival, St Magnus Festival, East Neuk Festival and Marlboro Music School and Festival. He made his Wigmore Hall debut in 2012 and has performed there annually since.

In 2014 he performed Alasdair Nicolson's piece Magnus, written specially for the event, at an 80th birthday celebration for Peter Maxwell Davies at Glasgow City Halls.

He was one of BBC Radio 3's New Generation Artists for 2012–2014, and performed with the BBC Singers in a concert broadcast live from St Paul's Church, Knightsbridge in January 2015. His performances appeared on the cover disc of the February 2016 edition of BBC Music Magazine.

'Dreams & Fancies', his 2017 debut album released on Delphian Records, entered the UK Classical Specialist Charts at No.3. BBC Radio 3's Record Review said of the album: "It's not often a guitar recital leaves me slightly stunned, but this one did. Just listen to the sound, the way Shibe changes the colour even during a phrase... what a seductive sound, incredibly clean playing, and almost miraculous changes of colour and timbre, never empty gestures, always to articulate the counterpoint and phrasing. Inspired by Julian Bream's pioneering spirit perhaps, but this is playing on an exalted level... If you only buy one guitar recital this year – it's called Dreams & Fancies." Graham Rickson at The Arts Desk wrote: "This is the best solo guitar disc I've heard."

Shibe's second full solo album, 'softLOUD', received the inaugural Gramophone Award for Concept Album of the Year. Martin Cullingford, writing in Gramophone Magazine, said: "We wanted to draw attention to those albums where a creative mind has curated something visionary, a programme whose whole speaks more powerfully than its parts. A thought-through journey, which compels to be heard in one sitting. A concept that makes a virtue of the genre. Our inaugural winner was a personal reaction to events: the EU referendum, the American elections, the murder of a British MP on the streets of her constituency... ‘Have we today forgotten how to speak softly and with grace; or is the real danger that we aren’t screaming loudly enough?’ asks Shibe in the sleeves notes, but, ultimately, through the programme itself. ‘softLOUD’ is a fascinating answer to the question of what, today, an album can do, and be."

In March 2020 Shibe performed 'Ingwe' at "ear splitting volume" at Wigmore Hall, resulting in over 20 audience members leaving the recital.

Shibe's third album on Delphian, titled BACH won Gramophone Magazine Editor's Choice and sat at the top of the UK Official Charts for seven weeks.

In 2020, Shibe signed an exclusive, multi-album agreement with PENTATONE, and has released three critically-acclaimed releases with the label. In April 2024, Shibe won the BBC Music Magazine Instrumental Award for his album Profesión.

== Discography ==
- Vesper, Pentatone, 2026
- Adès: Forgotten Dances, Pentatone, 2025
- Campanella, Pentatone, 2024
- Profesión, Pentatone, 2023
- Broken Branches, Sean Shibe and Karim Sulayman, Pentatone, 2023
- Lost & Found, Pentatone, 2022
- Camino, Pentatone, 2021
- Bach: Pour la Luth ò Cembal, Delphian Records, 2020
- softLOUD: music for acoustic and electric guitars, Delphian Records, 2018
- Dreams & Fancies, Delphian Records, 2017

== Awards ==
- 2009: Ivor Mairants Guitar Award
- 2011: Royal Over-Seas League Annual Music Competition String Prize, Gold Medal and First Prize
- 2012: Borletti-Buitoni Trust Fellowship recipient
- 2012–2015: Appointed BBC New Generation Artist
- 2015–2018: Appointed Young Classical Artists Trust Artist
- 2017: Gramophone Editor's Choice and BBC Music Magazine Instrumental Choice for first solo album, 'Dreams & Fancies'
- 2018: 'Dreams & Fancies' shortlisted for BBC Music Magazine Instrumental Award; shortlisted for 2 Royal Philharmonic Society Music Awards (Instrumentalist and Young Artist); receive RPS Award for Young Artists; shortlisted for Classical Brit Award; 2nd album, 'softLOUD', released and receives BBC Music Magazine Instrumental Choice.
- 2019: 'softLOUD' shortlisted for BBC Music Magazine Instrumental Award; 'softLOUD' receives inaugural Gramophone Award for Concept Album of the Year
- 2021: 'Bach' receives Gramophone Award for Instrumental Category
- 2022: Leonard Bernstein Award
- 2023: Grammy nomination, for Broken Branches, with Karim Sulayman
- 2024: BBC Music Magazine, Instrumental Award for Profesión

== See also ==
- List of classical guitarists
