= Delphian Records =

Scottish independent record label

- Founded: 2000
- Founder: Paul Baxter and Kevin Findlan
- Genre: Classical music
- Country of origin: United Kingdom
- Location: Edinburgh
- Official website: www.delphianrecords.co.uk

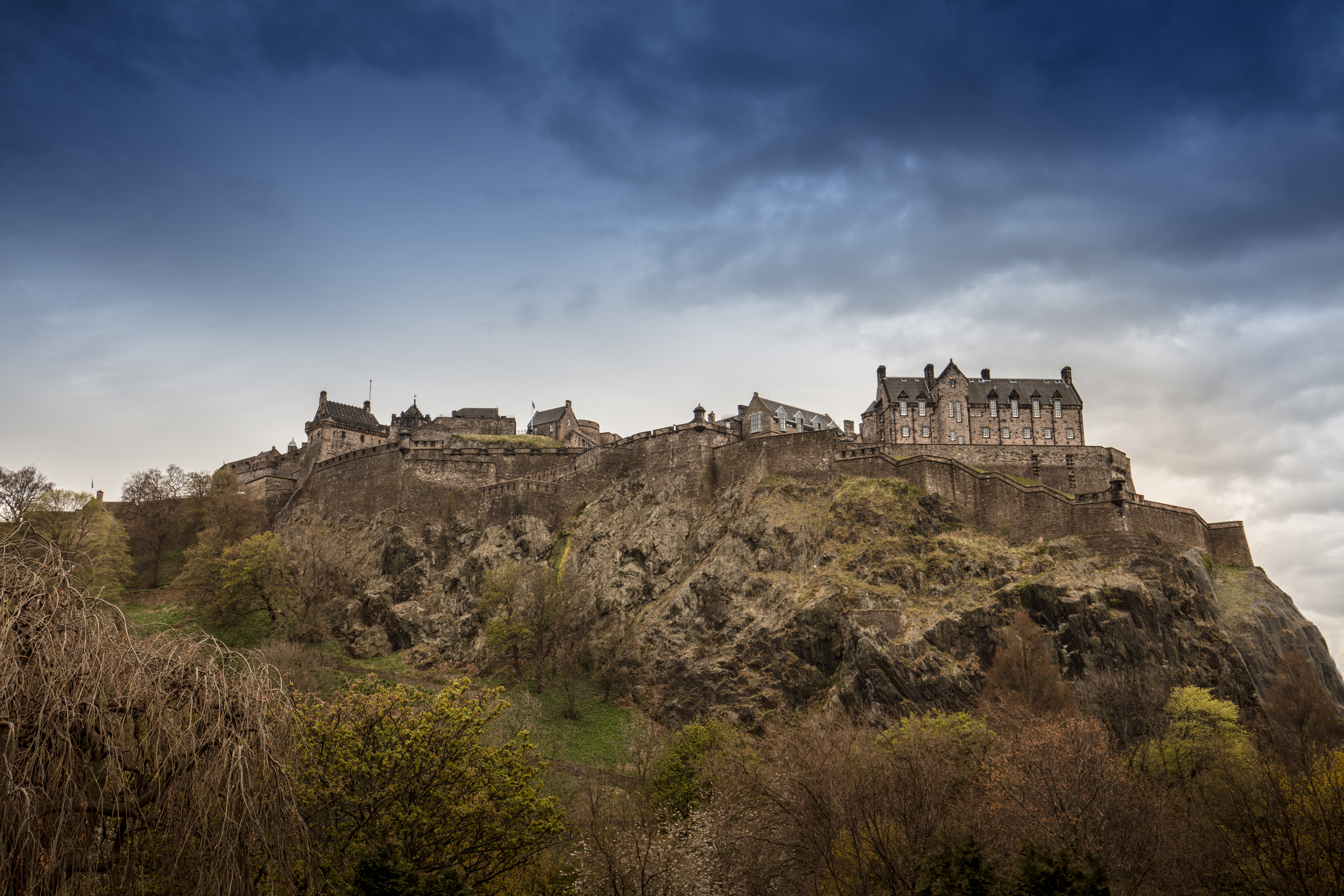
Delphian Records, based in Edinburgh, home of the Edinburgh International Festival

Delphian Records is an Edinburgh-based Scottish independent classical record label, founded in 2000 by two students of the University of Edinburgh, Paul Baxter and Kevin Findlan with start-up funding from two private individuals, and support from the Princes Scottish Youth Business Trust.

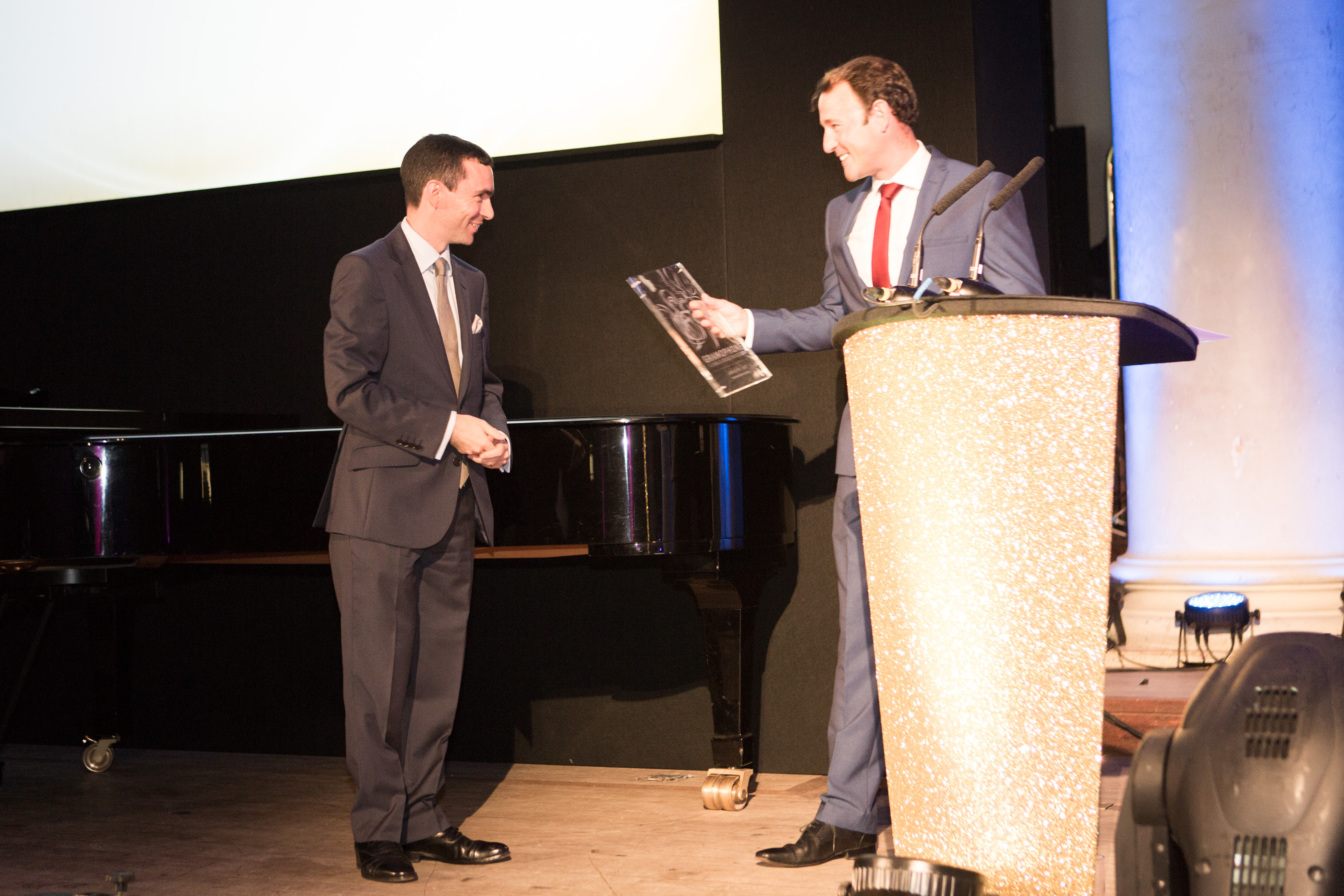
Paul Baxter receiving "Label of the Year" at 2014 Gramophone Awards

In 2014, Delphian Records was named Gramophone Magazine's "Label of the Year".

The label lends a special focus on chamber and instrumental music, and is particularly involved in the recording and promoting of new music. Following a substantial grant from the Scottish Government, the label released its first part-orchestral record in 2008 with the Scottish Chamber Orchestra and Garry Walker. In 2018 the label released "Out of the Silence: Orchestral Music by John McLeod" with the Royal Scottish National Orchestra and Dame Evelyn Glennie.

Notable projects include a 5-part series with the European Music Archeology Project (EMAP), collaborating with a team of archaeologists, musicologists, researchers, makers of musical instruments, composers, musicians, film-makers, sound designers and multimedia artists, and the scientific support of universities, to re-imagine music from pre-history to Classical Antiquity. The series, which culminated in 2018, was named by BBC Music Magazine as "a delight from start to finish".

Renowned for a number of collaborative projects, Delphian Records regularly secures funding from Creative Scotland and AHRC. In 2012, Delphian mounted a major production of Alexander McCall Smith and Tom Cunningham's opera The Okavango Macbeth, performed by Scottish group Mr McFall's Chamber.

In 2018 Will Campbell-Gibson assumed management of Delphian, co-ordinating the label's fixed team of designers, editors, and technicians - in addition to a network of 21 sales teams across the globe; Baxter continues to steer the label's artistic policy and produce Delphian's recordings. As well as producing discs for labels such as Signum and Onyx, Baxter has produced almost every title on the Delphian catalogue.

== Artists ==
Notable artists on Delphian's roster include: Dame Evelyn Glennie, The Marian Consort, The Illyria Consort and Bojan Cicic, Michael Bonaventure, Sean Shibe, Gordon Ferries, Mr McFall's Chamber, The Choir of Merton College, Oxford, Robert Irvine, John Kitchen, Simon Smith, David Wilde, The Choir of Gonville and Caius College/Geoffrey Webber, National Youth Choir of Great Britain and Laudibus, Oxana Shevchenko, Samantha Crawford (soprano), and Peter Hill.
