= Marian Consort =

British vocal ensemble

- Origin: United Kingdom
- Genres: Early music, Choral music, Renaissance music, Medieval music, Contemporary music
- Years active: 2008–present
- Labels: Linn Records, Delphian Records
- Website: www.marianconsort.co.uk

The Marian Consort is a British vocal ensemble led by founder and artistic director Rory McCleery. They perform early music going back as far as the 12th century, and specialize in Medieval and Renaissance music, as well as contemporary music. They tour internationally, typically performing with eight singers, with McCleery conducting.

Since 2022 they record on the Linn Records label.

Formed in 2008, they tour internationally and have released more than a dozen albums. They have performed newly commissioned music and world premieres of music by a number of contemporary composers. For 2024–2025 the Consort established a talent development program for composers, Emerging Voices.

The Marian Consort (named for the Virgin Mary) is known as a champion of the music of 16th-century Black composer Vicente Lusitano. They have performed his music at the BBC Proms and elsewhere and recorded the first commercial recordings of music from Lusitano's 1551 volume “Liber Primus Epigramatum.”

In 2024 they became a partner in the 2024 Choir & Organ New Music Series.

== Discography ==
- Una poesia muta: Art in early Cinquecento Venice – Linn Records, 2025
- A Winged Woman – Linn Records, 2024
- Inviolata (EP) – Linn Records, 2022
- Vicente Lusitano: Motets – Linn Records, 2022
- Adriatic Voyage - Seventeenth-Century Music From Venice To Dalmatia (with The Illyria Consort) – Delphian Records, 2021
- Singing In Secret: Clandestine Catholic Music By William Byrd – Delphian Records, 2020
- In Sorrow's Footsteps – Delphian, 2018
- Pater Peccavi: Music Of Lamentation From Renaissance Portugal – Delphian Records, 2018
- Music For The Queen Of Heaven: Contemporary Marian Motets – Delphian Records, 2017
- Stabat Mater – Delphian Records, 2016
- Gesualdo – Delphian Records, 2016
- Loquebantur: Music From The Baldwin Partbooks (with Rose Consort of Viols) – Delphian Records, 2015
- Christmas with the Shepherds – Delphian Records, 2014
- Jean Maillard: Missa Je Suis Déshéritée & Motets – Delphian Records, 2013
- An Emerald In A Work Of Gold (Music From The Dow Partbooks) (with Rose Consort of Viols) – Delphian Records, 2012
- O Virgo Benedicta (Music Of Marian Devotion From Spain's Century Of Gold) (with Rose Consort of Viols) – Delphian Records, 2010
