= Mob Quad =

Group of buildings from the 13th and 14th centuries in Merton College, Oxford

Coordinates: 51.7508°N 1.2524°W

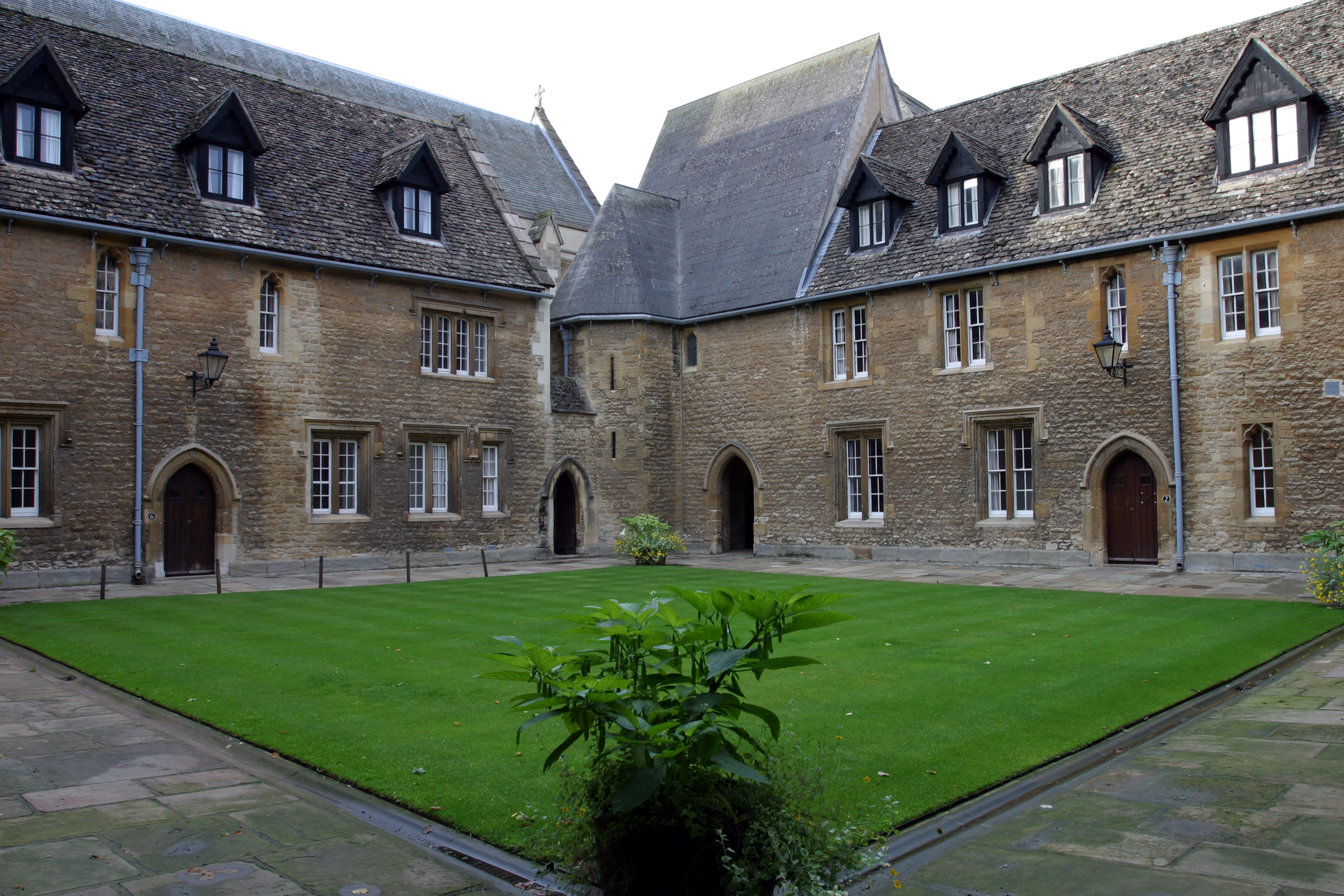
Mob Quad in 2005, looking north-east

Mob Quad is a four-sided group of buildings from the 13th and 14th centuries in Merton College, Oxford, surrounding a small lawn. It is often claimed to be the oldest quadrangle in Oxford and elsewhere, although Merton's own Front Quad was actually enclosed earlier (albeit with a less unified design) and Corpus Christi College, Cambridge, says that its own Old Court is the oldest structure of its type in either Oxford or Cambridge. The quadrangle pattern has since been copied at many other colleges and universities worldwide.

It was built in three distinct phases. The oldest part is the college's Treasury or Muniment Room that stands above and behind the arch in the north east corner. The roof of this part is strikingly steep and is made of stone in order to protect it (and its contents) from fire. The steep pitch of the roof is necessary to support the weight of the stone. The present roof was restored with new Purbeck stone in 1966. The upper floor has always been used to store the college muniments, while the ground floor was probably the original bursary. It is not known exactly when the building was completed, but there are references to it in the college accounts for 1288 and 1291. The Muniment Room being built above a vaulted arch is suggested as evidence that the range of buildings to the south was either planned at the time of the original design or was replacing an existing building.

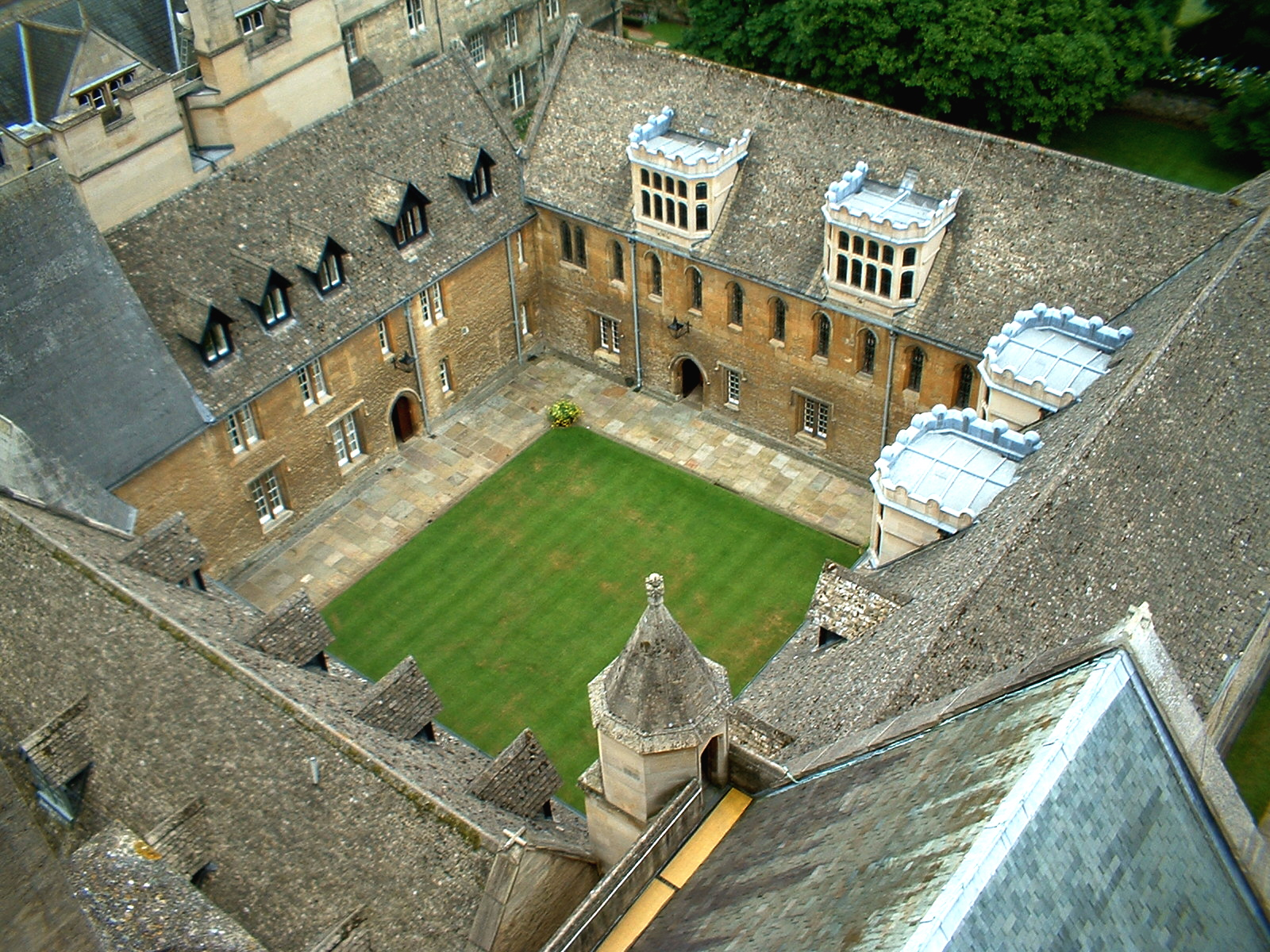
Mob Quad in 2003, from Merton College Chapel tower

This range to the south of the Muniment Room (the East side) was complete by about 1310–1320. The matching North side is probably slightly earlier and apparently stands on the site of the former church of St John, which was no longer needed once the new chapel was complete. The college accounts indicate that the old church was being used as rooms by 1308, and it is possible that parts of its structure were incorporated into the new building.

These buildings were designed, and are still used, as accommodation for members of the college. They consist of three storeys of rooms, the third being built in the steeply pitched attics. The rooms are arranged in sets on either side of central wooden staircases. The walls are thick and faced in rag-finished Cotswold stone. There are no chimneys and although all the rooms had fireplaces and chimneys by about 1600, they have been removed in modern times as the coal fireplaces have been replaced with electric heating.

The south and west ranges which complete the quadrangle were built in 1373–1378. They were built to provide more accommodation (on the ground floor) and to house the expanding college library (on the upper floor). The old part of the library is still there, and, still expanding, it also now occupies most of the ground floor as well (and other parts of the college). The large dormer windows were added as part of Warden Savile's rebuilding work which began in 1589.

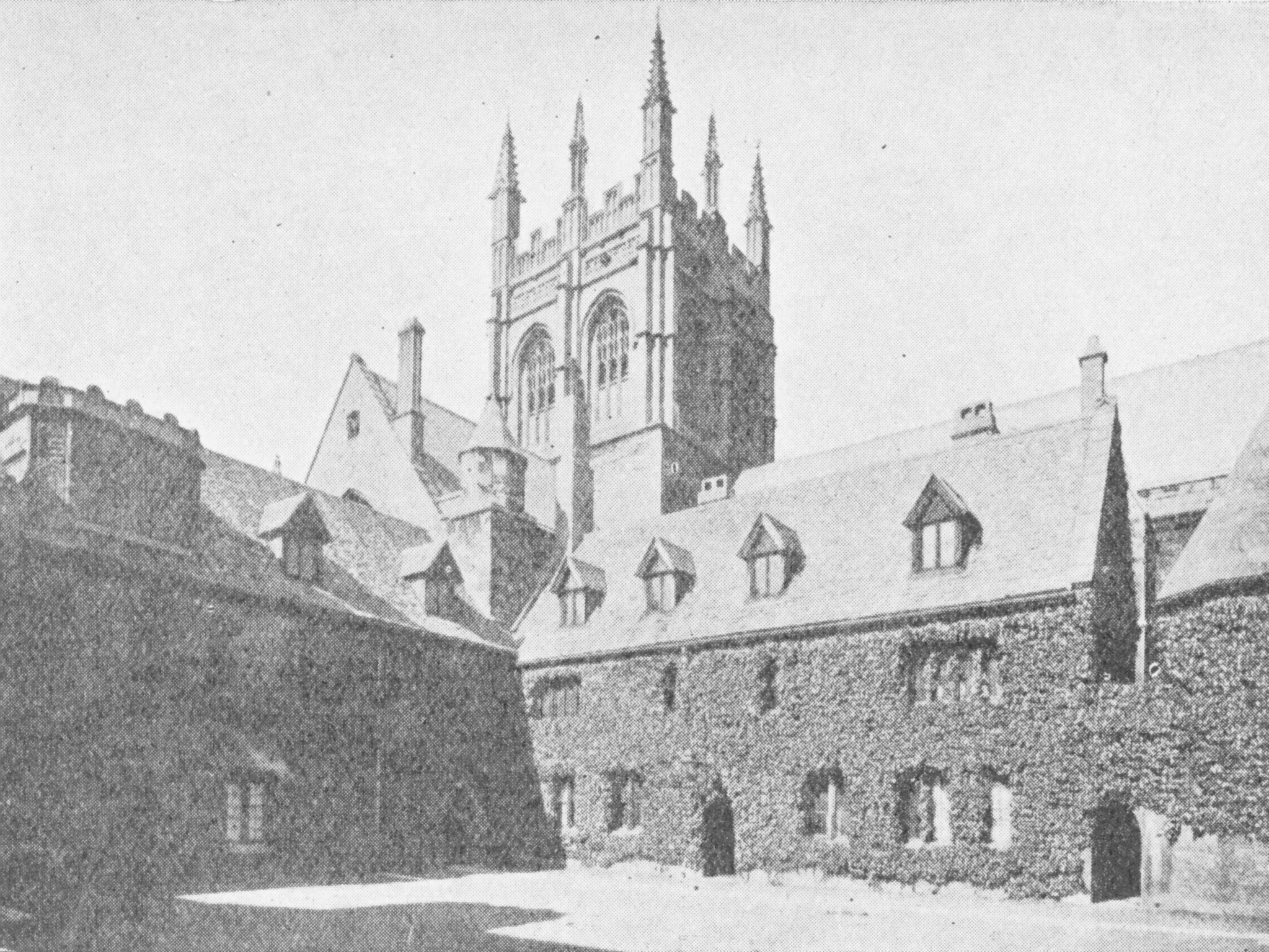
Mob Quad in 1910, looking north-west

The origin of the name "Mob Quad" is obscure. On older plans and accounts the quad is called variously Little Quadrangle, Old Quadrangle, Bachelors' Quadrangle (that is, B.A. Fellows), Postmasters' Quadrangle, and Undergraduates' Quadrangle (at least after the construction of Fellows' Quadrangle). The word "mob", derived from the Latin mobile vulgus (the fickle crowd) does not appear in English until the late 17th century, and was not commonly used for Mob Quad until the end of the 18th century. It was possibly originally a humorous description of the occupants.

The lawn is a 20th-century addition.

== See also ==
- Merton College, Oxford
- Merton College Library
