= Meadows (surname) =

Meadows is a medieval English surname. Commonly recorded alternative spellings are Medows, Meddowes and Medewes.

The name is topographical in origin, indicating someone who lived near a meadow or grassland, and derives from the pre-7th century word for meadow "maed", or Middle English "mede".

Notable people with the surname include:

- Abram Henson Meadows (1859–1932), American showman
- Audrey Meadows (1922–1996), American actress
- Austin Meadows (born 1995), American baseball player
- Bernard Meadows (1915–2005), British sculptor
- Bobby Meadows (born 1938), English footballer
- Brian Meadows (born 1975), American baseball player
- Carter Meadows (born 2007), American football player
- Catherine Meadows, American cryptographer
- Charles Medows (1737–1816), British nobleman & naval officer
- Clarence W. Meadows (1904–1961), American Attorney General
- Daniel Meadows (born 1952), British photographer
- Dennis Meadows (born 1942), American scientist
- Dennis Meadows (politician) (born 1966), Jamaican politician
- Donella Meadows (1941–2001), American environmental scientist
- Earle Meadows (1913–1992), American pole-vaulter
- Frederick Meadows (1886–1975), Canadian athlete
- Gavin Meadows (born 1977), British swimmer
- Ian Meadows (born 1983), Australian actor and writer
- Isabel Meadows (1846–1939), American native linguist
- Jason Meadows (born 1971), American musician
- Jayne Meadows (1919–2015), American actress
- James Meadows (disambiguation page), several individuals
- James Joseph Meadows (1835–1914), English missionary
- John Meadows (disambiguation page), several individuals
- Johnny Meadows (Australian footballer) (1880–1974), Australian footballer
- Joyce Meadows (born 1933), Canadian actress
- Kenny Meadows (1790–1874), British illustrator & caricaturist
- Kristen Meadows (born 1957), American TV actress
- Louie Meadows (born 1961), American baseball player
- Mark Meadows (disambiguation page), several individuals
- Marion Meadows (born 1962), American jazz musician
- Matthew Meadows (1938-2025), American politician
- Michael Meadows (born 1955), British-South African physical geographer
- Michael Meadows (born 1987), English racing driver
- Miles Meadows, Canadian actor and singer
- Parker Meadows (born 1999), American baseball player
- Peter S. Meadows, British political scientist
- Punky Meadows (born 1950), American guitarist
- Richard J. Meadows (1931–1995), American soldier
- Rob Meadows (born 1976), American internet entrepreneur
- Roy Meadow (born 1933), British paediatrician
- Shane Meadows (born 1972), British film director
- Sidney Meadows (c.1699–1792), British politician
- Stanley Meadows (1931-2025), British actor
- Stephen Meadows (born 1950), American actor and architect
- Susannah Meadows, American journalist
- Tae Meadows (born 2004), American football player
- Tim Meadows (born 1961), American actor and comedian
- Travis Meadows, American country musician
- William Meadows (1833–1920), Anglo-American agriculturist and politician
