= Meadows (disambiguation) =

Meadows are a habitat where grasses predominate.

Meadows may also refer to:

- Meadows (surname), an English surname, including a list of people with the name
- Meadows, Newfoundland and Labrador, a town near Corner Brook, Newfoundland, Canada
- L'Anse aux Meadows, the remains of a Viking village in Newfoundland
- Meadows, Illinois, an unincorporated community located near Peoria
- Meadows, Maryland, an unincorporated community near Joint Base Andrews
- New Meadows, Idaho, a town in the Meadows Valley, on the Little Salmon River
- Meadows, South Australia, a town in the Adelaide Hills
- The Meadow Building, Christ Church, Oxford, England, known locally as "Meadows"
- "Meadows", a song by MazeOne and RIP Swirl appearing on the 2018 Gorillaz EP A Solar Collaboration

== See also ==
- Meadow (disambiguation)
- The Meadows (disambiguation)
- Mountain Meadows (disambiguation)
