= The Meadow =

The Meadow may refer to:

== Arts and entertainment ==
- The Meadow (film), a 1979 Italian drama
- The Meadow (painting), an 1875 painting by Alfred Sisley
- The Meadow (play), a 1947 radio drama by Ray Bradbury

== Places ==
- The Meadow, Downpatrick, a cricket ground in Northern Ireland
- The Meadow Building, Christ Church, University of Oxford, England
- The Meadow, a football ground in Chesham, England; home ground of Chesham United and Aylesbury United

== See also ==
- Meadow (disambiguation)
- The Meadows (disambiguation)
