= Safety for Sarah movement =

Social media movement & campaign for safety on film sets, in memory of Sarah Jones

The Safety for Sarah movement is a campaign for increased safety in film production, named in memory of Sarah Jones, a camera assistant on Midnight Rider who was killed by a train during filming as a result of unsafe actions by the film's director and producer.

== Train collision ==
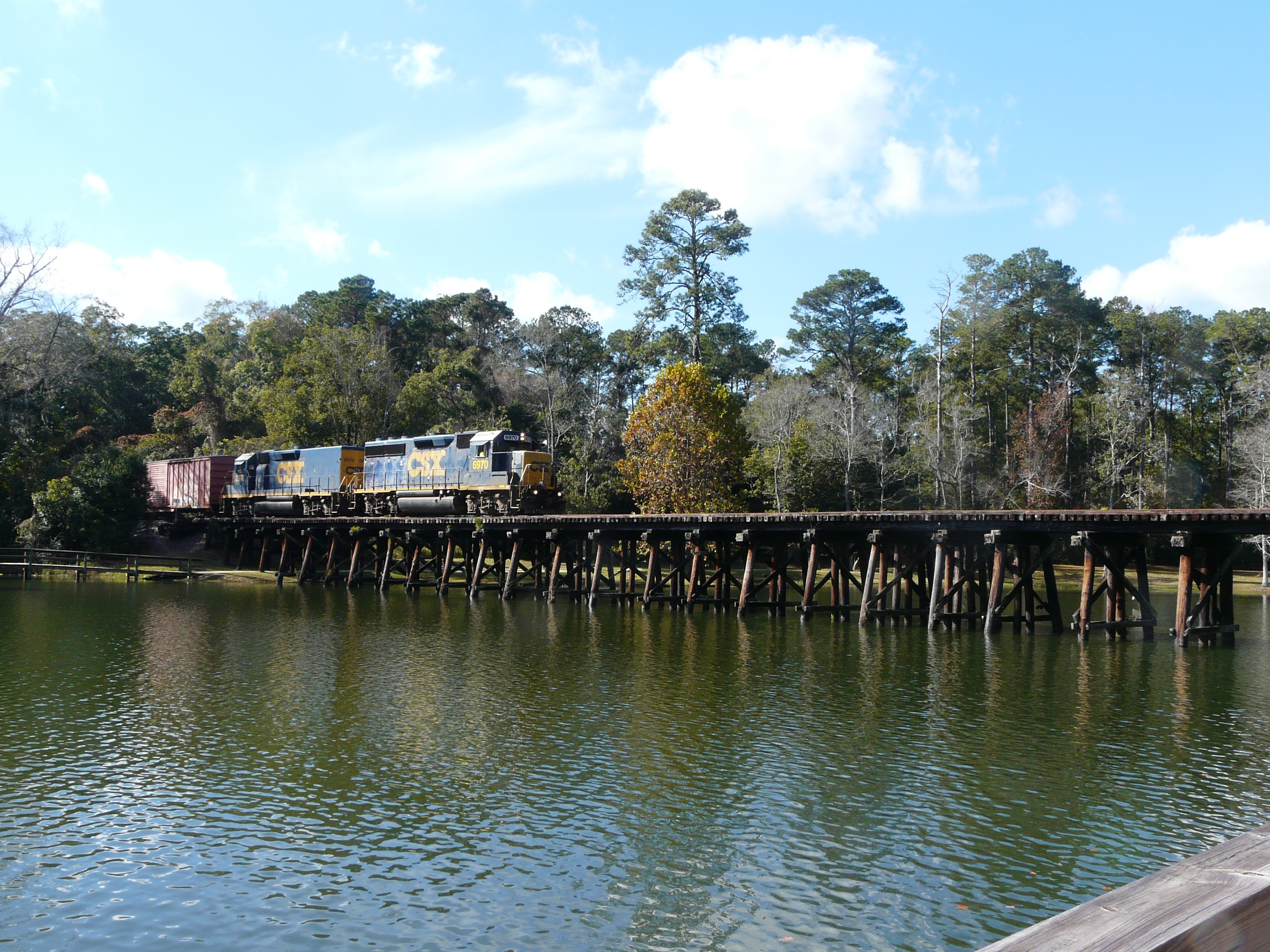
CSX train on railroad trestle bridge, Georgia, USA

On February 20, 2014, the film crew, under the direction of producer/director Randall Miller, started filming a dream sequence involving William Hurt as Gregg Allman on a heavy metal hospital bed on a live railroad trestle above the Altamaha River. The producers had assured the cast and crew that it was safe to film there. While they were shooting, a CSX freight train, with CSX AC4400CW locomotive #372 leading and C40-8W #7921 trailing, came around a corner at 58 mph (93 km/h; 26 m/s), giving the crew less than a minute to evacuate from the location, a substantial way out onto the trestle. The only escape route was toward the oncoming train. Video of the crew indicates that they were unaware how fast it was approaching; some attempted to remove camera equipment and the metal bed from the trestle. They failed to remove the bed before the train rolled through, and many of the crew were trapped out on the trestle. The train struck and shattered the metal bed, sending shrapnel toward crew members. Fragments struck camera assistant Sarah Jones and propelled her toward the still fast moving train, resulting in her death. William Hurt got off the trestle before the train hit the hospital bed. Several other crew members were injured and were taken to hospital.

== Tributes ==
=== Slates for Sarah ===
Several film crews began posting slates in tribute to Sarah Jones, starting with the crew of the television show Drop Dead Diva on February 21, 2014, and friends began to post tributes. On February 24, 2014, the Facebook page 'Slates for Sarah' was created to bring these tributes together in one place. With the statement "Sarah Elizabeth Jones, friend and family to so many, made every day awesome. Show your slate love here along with all the good stories of her life", the page went viral with photographs of crew slates from around the world. In less than 24 hours, 'Slates for Sarah' grew to 9,400 likes and included slates from It's Always Sunny In Philadelphia, The Vampire Diaries, Glee, Parks and Recreation, Castle, Hawaii Five-O, Brooklyn Nine-Nine, Criminal Minds, The Big Bang Theory, Halt and Catch Fire, Elementary, Scandal, Devious Maids, Justified, Downton Abbey, The Crazy Ones, Supernatural, NCIS, Arrow, Bones, and Rectify. In less than a week, the page grew to 63,000 likes and was supportive of the separate successful initiatives to have Jones recognized during the live Oscar telecast and for Oscar winners to wear ribbons on stage in her memory.

=== Television episodes ===
The episode "Still" from season 4 of The Walking Dead, the episode "No Exit" from season 5 of The Vampire Diaries, and the episode "Cheers and Jeers" from season 6 of Drop Dead Diva were dedicated to Jones. The end credits to the 2015 film Meadowland included a message about Jones' death, the importance of following safety practices on a movie set, and the URL for the Safety for Sarah website. A number of other tributes and memorials were held, including those hosted by Society of Operating Cameramen, the International Cinematographers Guild, and several unions.

=== Vigils ===
In addition to the memorial held in Jones' hometown of Columbia, South Carolina, a vigil was held in Charlotte, North Carolina, and a memorial in Atlanta, Georgia, where around 700 gathered to both remember how Jones lived and make sure her memory inspires change in the film industry. A candle light vigil was held in Los Angeles where over 500 friends and participants marched from the Directors Guild of America headquarters to the national offices of the International Cinematographers Guild on Sunset Boulevard for a memorial service attended by many members of the film community.

=== Awards shows ===
An online petition campaign to include Jones in the "In Memoriam" segment of the 86th Academy Awards ceremony scheduled for March 2, 2014, achieved more than 55,000 signatures and was submitted to the Academy of Motion Picture Arts and Sciences. The campaign succeeded, and Jones was acknowledged in a graphic shown to the television audience after Bette Midler sang "Wind Beneath My Wings" as part of the "In Memoriam" reel segment. She was included in the Academy's gallery tribute on its website, and six Oscar winners wore "Ribbons for Sarah" on stage during their acceptance speeches.

Jones was also remembered during the 'In Memoriam' segment of the Creative Arts Emmys on August 16, 2014, and by producer Harry Bring during the inaugural Locations Manager Awards March 29, 2014.

=== Walk-a-thons ===
Walk-a-thons took place on October 5, 2014, in Atlanta, Georgia, Santa Monica, California, and Central Park in New York City, to remember Jones and raise money for set safety. The Atlanta walk was led by Jones' family as well as cast and crew members of The Vampire Diaries and The Originals, including writer/EP Julie Plec and TVD star Paul Wesley. As a fund raiser for The Sarah Jones Film Foundation the walks had raised $35,000 as of October 6.

== Reaction ==
While the tributes to Jones were of a very personal nature, they also became part of a larger industry wide call to address pervasive safety issues, and many notable representatives of the film industry made statements. Richard Crudo, President of the American Society of Cinematographers said as part of a larger statement, "As directors of photography, we have always been responsible for the safety of our crews, and it is incumbent upon us to find ways to be more decent and caring not only to them, but also to everyone we know." He continued, "It won't always be easy; at times, it will run counter to initial impulses. But if our example proves worthy, it might make a start toward curing the spiritual sickness I have described. It would also stand as the most profound tribute any of us could offer to the memory of Sarah Jones." Academy Award winning cinematographer Haskell Wexler said, "The Sarah Jones tragedy brings the public's attention to something that has been going on for a number of years, Sarah's father has said – and I agree with him – that the only way her death will not be in vain is if we pay serious attention to safety. We are making entertainment and there's no reason to risk our lives and our health to get a shot."

== A Pledge to Sarah and Set Safety app ==
A group of film industry veterans formed the group 'A Pledge to Sarah' to encourage film professionals to sign a pledge to dedicate themselves to promoting safe sets. The group also led a successful Indiegogo campaign to raise funds to develop a smartphone safety app to help address on set safety issues. The funding goal was exceeded in three-and-a-half days. On October 3, the app "Set Safety" was released for android users, and on October 14, it was released for the Apple iOS platform.

The International Cinematographers Guild released a smartphone app "ICG Safety", on both Android and iOS platforms, to similarly address safety issues on set.

== Sarah Jones Film Foundation ==
While 'Slates for Sarah' initially focused on celebrating the life of Jones, it quickly became a rallying cry to address the many long standing safety problems on film and television sets. Jones' parents have said they will use the banner 'Safety for Sarah' to help keep this movement going forward. In September, Jones' family announced the organization 'The Sarah Jones Film Foundation' would be the umbrella organization for film scholarship programs; Safety for Sarah, set safety efforts; and 'Slates for Sarah'.
