= James Meadows =

James Meadows may refer to:

- James Joseph Meadows (1835–1914), Protestant Christian missionary to China
- Jimmy Meadows (1931–1994), English footballer and manager
- James S. Meadows (1911–1981), Lord Mayor of Birmingham, England for the year 1966–1967
- James Meadows (rugby league) (born 1999), rugby league footballer
- James Meadows (pioneer) (1817–1902), English-born pioneer who settled in Carmel Valley, California

== See also ==
- James Meadows Rendel (disambiguation)
