= Mountain Meadows =

Mountain Meadows may refer to:

- Mountain Meadows, Utah, most known for the massacre in 1857
  - Mountain Meadows massacre, the 1857 killing of emigrants in a wagon train
- Mountain Meadows (album), a 2008 album by Elliott Brood
- Mountain Meadows Reservoir, California, United States
- Mountain Meadows, Colorado

== See also ==
- Montane ecosystem
- Mountain Meadow (disambiguation)
- Meadow (disambiguation)
- The Meadows (disambiguation)
