= James Meadows Tract =

James Meadows Tract Rancho Palo Escrito
- Mexican land grant
- Location of Monterey County, California James Meadows Tract (the United States)
- Coordinates: 36°31′46″N 121°49′39″W
- Country: United States
- State: California
- County: Monterey County, USA
- Established: 1840

James Meadows Tract, also known as Rancho Palo Escrito, was a 4,592 acres (1,858 ha) Mexican land grant in present-day Monterey County, California given on January 27, 1840, by Governor Juan Alvarado to Carmel Mission civil administrator, José Antonio Romero. The land was later sold by Monterey businessman Thomas O. Larkin to English-born James Meadows (1817–1902) in 1848. The grant extended along the Carmel River and Carmel Valley, bounded by Rancho Cañada de la Segunda to the west, Rancho Los Laureles to the east, and Garland Ranch Regional Park to the south. Meadows received the legal land patent on August 9, 1866, that became known as the Meadows Tract for 4,591.71 acres (1,858.20 ha).

== History ==
Hand-drawn diseño (map) of James Meadows Ranch Layout supporting land claim, No. 159 S.D. (1852)

Map of the county of Monterey showing the James Meadows Tract (1877).

Map indicating James Meadows land grant (1898).

In 1836, when the Carmel Mission pasture lands were divided into large land grants called ranchos, Maria Loreta Onésimo (1819–1892) and Domingo Antonio Peralta (1819 -1841) were given a large tract by the mission padres for her marriage to Domingo, which they cultivated and planted with corn, tomatoes, and onions. José Antonio Romero, Carmel Mission civil administrator, threatened the Peraltas with eviction because they had no written deed to the property and since they were Indians, their claim to the land grant was easily challenged. Governor Juan Bautista Alvarado awarded the grant to José Antonio Romero on January 27, 1840. The actual name of the grant for Romero when it was recorded was "Land – Monterey County," in the County of Monterey, Expediente Number 193, 336.

=== James Meadows ===
James Meadows (1817–1902)

José Antonio Romero sold the 4,592 acres (1,858 ha) Rancho Palo Escrito land grant to William Garner in January 1847. Garner sold the deed to Thomas O. Larkin, a Monterey businessman, who then sold it to English-born James Meadows (1817–1902) in 1848. The name Palo Escrito, in Spanish means "written stick." The name was used for this land as early as 1828 by Father Vincent de Sarria and Father Ramon Abella of the Carmel Mission.

With the Mexican Cession of California to the United States following the Mexican-American War, the 1848 Treaty of Guadalupe Hidalgo provided that the land grants would be honored. On December 28, 1858, Meadows became an American citizen. As required by the California Land Act of 1851, Meadows filed a claim for the Palo Escrito land grant on November 5, 1859, with the Public Land Commission. Meadows received the legal land patent on August 9, 1866, that became known as the Meadows Tract for 4,591.71 acres (1,858.20 ha).

The Palo Escrito area was the home of Rumsen Native Americans like Maria Loreta Onésimo (1819–1892), wife on James Meadows, and their daughter Isabel Meadows (1846–1935). James Meadows had a dairy on the property where he hired jobless Chinese workers. He built an adobe house near the Carmel River. Meadows was known for his generosity and donated land and helped establish, what was first called the Meadows School, and later renamed the Carmelo School. It was the earliest school in Carmel Valley. He was a trustee of the Carmelo School District until his death on July 13, 1902, at his Meadows ranch in Carmel Valley.

=== James Meadows tract partitioned ===
James Meadows died in 1902 with many heirs. In 1905, the Meadows Tract was partitioned into multiple lots, referred to as the Partition Map of the James Meadows Tract. Lot 6, which contained 80.82 acres (32.71 ha) was owned by Frank Yates Meadows (1844–1916) and his wife Pauline (1853–1918).

In 1916, a notice of sale was listed in the Carmel Pine Cone, saying that, Ernestine V. Northup (1874–1950) (formerly Ernestine V. Meadows) would sale the Lot 10 partition from her former husband, Thomas P. Meadows (1860–1940), to raise $1,002.29 (equivalent to $29,646 in 2025) for a judgement rendered by the Superior Court of Montery County. In 1936, Thomas Carmel Meadows (1878–1959) sold his land to Luis Frederico Wolter (1894–1957) and Martha Winslow Wolter (1896-1955).

The Meadows ranch passed to Edward L. Meadows who in turn passed it on to his son Roy E. (1886–1971). Roy and his wife Rena O. Beaverton (1887–1974) raised their children on the family ranch. The Meadows house was torn down in 1925 and replaced with an eight-room stucco home. In 1960, Roy and his sister Lora (Meadows) Humble sold 670 acres (270 ha) for $68,500 (equivalent to $745,487 in 2025) to Glayton Neil to be subdivided.

=== Historic sites of the Meadows Tract ===
- Carmelo School James Meadows donated land and helped establish, what was first called the Meadows School, and later renamed the Carmelo School. It was the earliest school in Carmel Valley.

== See also ==
- Ranchos of California
- List of Ranchos of California
