= Mountain Meadow =

Mountain Meadow may refer to:

== Places ==
- Mountain Meadow Preserve, in Massachusetts and Vermont
- Mountain Meadow Ranch, in Susanville, California
- Mountain Meadow Lake, in Northern California
- Mountain Meadow, Utah, region in Washington County, Utah
- Mountain Meadow Farm, historical farm in Chester County, Pennsylvania

== Other ==
- Mountain Meadow, US title of John Buchan's 1941 novel Sick Heart River

== See also ==
- Montane ecosystem
- Mountain Meadows (disambiguation)
- The Meadows (disambiguation)
- Meadow (disambiguation)
