= John Meadows =

John or Johnny Meadows may refer to:

- John Meadows III (1944–2018), American politician
- John Armstrong Taylor Meadows (1817–1875), British interpreter and merchant in China
- Johnny Meadows (Australian footballer) (1880–1974), Australian rules footballer for Essendon
- Johnny Meadows (English footballer) (1930–2018), English footballer
- John Meadows (rugby union) (born 1949), Australian rugby union player
- John Condrone (1960–2020), also known as Johnny Meadows, American professional wrestler
