= Azra Meadows =

British-Pakistani naturalist

Azra Meadows OBE is a Scottish lecturer of Pakistani descent. is an Honorary Lecturer in the Institute of Biomedical and Life Sciences at The University of Glasgow and is married to Professor Peter S. Meadows, along with whom she has carried out extensive work of an environmental, cultural and educational nature in both Scotland and Pakistan. Azra Meadows was born in Glasgow to Pakistani parents.

Professor Peter S. Meadows and Dr Azra Meadows are the editors of The Glasgow Naturalist, the annual publication of The Glasgow Natural History Society.

In addition to this, Azra Meadows is a Director of The Scottish Academy of Asian Arts, has previously held the post of chairperson of the Scottish Pakistani Society and, in 2006, was elected for a second term to the Council of the Zoological Society of London, of which she is also a Trustee.

== Cultural initiatives ==
Amongst the projects in which Professor Peter Meadows and Dr Azra Meadows have played a significant role is the Connecting Futures:Student Dialogues programme.

Conceived by the Foreign and Commonwealth Office and the British Council, the aim of the initiative was to foster an understanding between the cultural backgrounds of students from the UK and those of Muslim countries, as part of which a delegation of sixteen students from the UK - four from The University of Glasgow, four from the University of Edinburgh, four from the University of Warwick and four from Cardiff University - visited Pakistan in 2005.

The Meadows, as well as facilitating the preparations for the delegation of Glasgow students - Anna Chiumento, Gary Sergeant, Zoe Nisbet and Tommy Ga-Ken Wan - have ensured that the value, purpose and success of the initiative is not forgotten. This has been done by arranging and assisting the students from Glasgow University to deliver, on several occasions, a lecture entitled Bridging the Divide: Myths and Realities, describing their experiences in Pakistan and their impact. At the invitation of Dr Maliha Lodhi, the High Commissioner of Pakistan to the United Kingdom, the lecture was delivered in September 2005 to an audience at the High Commission of Pakistan in London.

== Awards and nominations ==
In January 2014, Meadows was nominated for the Science and Engineering award at the British Muslim Awards.
