= AI Foundation =

Artificial intelligence company

- Type: Private
- Industry: Artificial intelligence
- Founded: 2017
- Founder: Lars Buttler and Rob Meadows
- Website: aifoundation.com

AI Foundation is an American artificial intelligence company. It is based in San Francisco and Las Vegas.

== History ==
Lars Buttler and Rob Meadows founded the AI Foundation, which creates intelligent agents that can be trained. The company was created in 2017 and had been operating in stealth mode until September 2018, when it was unveiled to the public for the first time.

AI Foundation is funded by Founders Fund, You & Mr Jones, Endeavor and Twitter co-founder Biz Stone.

At the One Young World conference started by David Jones, founder of You & Mr. Jones, Biz Stone and AI Foundation unveiled several prototypes such as a digital clone of Richard Branson.

On the Tonight Show with Jimmy Fallon, Deepak Chopra showed off his digital AI version of himself, developed the AI Foundation, which took Jimmy Fallon and the audience through a guided meditation. Deepak's AI was aptly called Digital Deepak and "will offer you advice whenever you need it" according to CNBC.

The first product AI Foundation released was called Reality Defender.

== See also ==
- Mind uploading
- Digital twin
- Chatbot
- Digital immortality
- Distributed cognition
- Transhumanism
