= Lumitrend =

Lumitrend, Inc. was a mobile software development firm founded in 2002 by Rob Meadows and Garrett Larsson, and was based in San Mateo, California. The company developed one of the first commercially available solutions to automatically and wirelessly backup a user's cell phone data including contacts, calendar, pictures, ring tones, wallpaper, and videos. The Intersynx technology platform utilized J2ME and Brew based technology and included products such as RingVault, CellBackup and CellSynx.

The company was acquired May 26, 2006 by Asurion, a cell phone insurance company for an undisclosed amount. Lumitrend, Inc was integrated with Asurion Mobile Applications, Inc and the products are now deployed on carriers such as AT&T, Sprint, T-Mobile, Verizon Wireless, U.S. Cellular, Metro PCS, Rogers Wireless, NTT DoCoMo, and KTF (Korea Telecom Freetel) and used by millions of users worldwide.
