= Binsey Poplars =

Poem by Gerard Manley Hopkins, written 1879

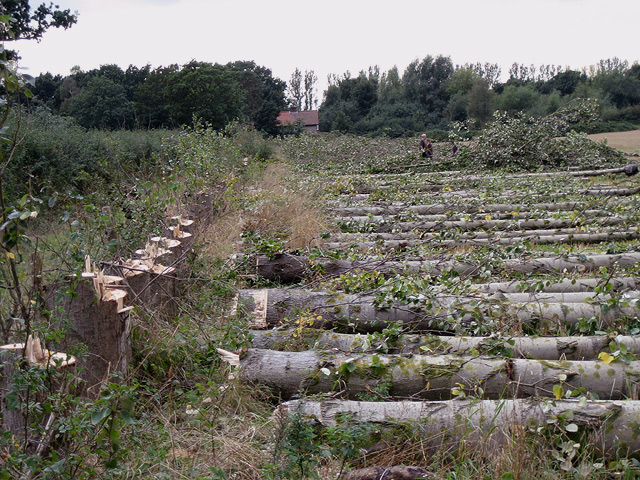
‘All felled, felled, are all felled’ — photograph of felled poplar trees with a line from the poem ‘Binsey Poplars’.

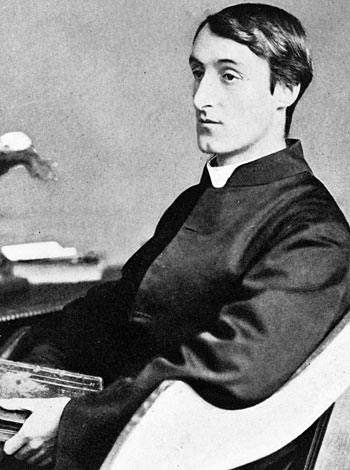
Gerard Manley Hopkins, author of ‘Binsey Poplars’.

"Binsey Poplars" is a poem by Gerard Manley Hopkins (1844–1889), written in 1879. The poem was inspired by the felling of a row of poplar trees near the village of Binsey, northwest of Oxford, England, and overlooking Port Meadow on the bank of the River Thames. The replacements for these trees, running from Binsey north to Godstow, lasted until 2004, when replanting began again.

The Bodleian Library of Oxford University holds a draft manuscript of the poem, handwritten by Hopkins, acquired in 2013.

== The poem ==
The text of the poem is as follows:

My aspens dear, whose airy cages quelled,
Quelled or quenched in leaves the leaping sun,
All felled, felled, are all felled;
Of a fresh and following folded rank
Not spared, not one
That dandled a sandalled
Shadow that swam or sank
On meadow and river and wind-wandering weed-winding bank.

O if we but knew what we do
When we delve or hew—
Hack and rack the growing green!
Since country is so tender
To touch, her being so slender,
That, like this sleek and seeing ball
But a prick will make no eye at all,
Where we, even where we mean
To mend her we end her,
When we hew or delve:
After-comers cannot guess the beauty been.
Ten or twelve, only ten or twelve
Strokes of havoc unselve
The sweet especial scene,
Rural scene, a rural scene,
Sweet especial rural scene.

== See also ==
- Poplar Walk, Christ Church Meadow
