= Sugarloaf, Colorado =

Census-designated place in Boulder County, CO, USA

- Census-designated place
- Location of the Sugarloaf CDP in Boulder County, Colorado
- Coordinates: 40°01′08″N 105°24′28″W
- Country: United States
- State: Colorado
- County: Boulder County

Government
  - Type: unincorporated community

Area
  - Total: 2.178 sq mi (5.640 km^{2})
  - Land: 2.178 sq mi (5.640 km^{2})
  - Water: 0 sq mi (0.000 km^{2})
- Elevation: 7,842 ft (2,390 m)

Population (2020)
  - Total: 274
  - Density: 126/sq mi (48.6/km^{2})
- Time zone: UTC-7 (MST)
  - Summer (DST): UTC-6 (MDT)
- ZIP Code: Boulder 80302
- Area codes: 303 & 720
- GNIS feature ID: 2583301

Sugarloaf (also spelled Sugar Loaf) is an unincorporated community and a census-designated place (CDP) located in and governed by Boulder County, Colorado, United States. The CDP is a part of the Boulder, CO Metropolitan Statistical Area. The population of the Sugarloaf CDP was 274 at the United States Census 2020. The Boulder post office (Zip Code 80302) serves the area.

== History ==
Sugarloaf, sometimes spelled Sugar Loaf, Boulder County, was referred to in Colorado historical records dating back to 1868. It seems the early name came from a mining claim referred to as "Sugar Loaf, near Yellow Pine." Sugar Loaf seems also to have been a term for a mining district, of multiple mining claims.

In 1989, a destructive wildfire swept up and across much of Sugarloaf burning 2,100 acres (850 ha), destroying 44 houses and other structures, and causing approximately US$10 million in damages. The Black Tiger Fire"was the worst wildland fire loss in Colorado history" at the time. It was a human-caused fire that started 9 July 1989 in a scenic mountain area at the base of Black Tiger Gulch and swept up to the summit of Sugarloaf Mountain through residential areas that were "nestled among the trees. Within the first five to six hours after ignition, 44 homes and other structures were destroyed and many others were damaged." Some fire fighters of the Sugarloaf Volunteer Fire Department had their own homes destroyed during the fire. Although there were a number of minor injuries, there were no fatalities from the fire.

== Geography ==
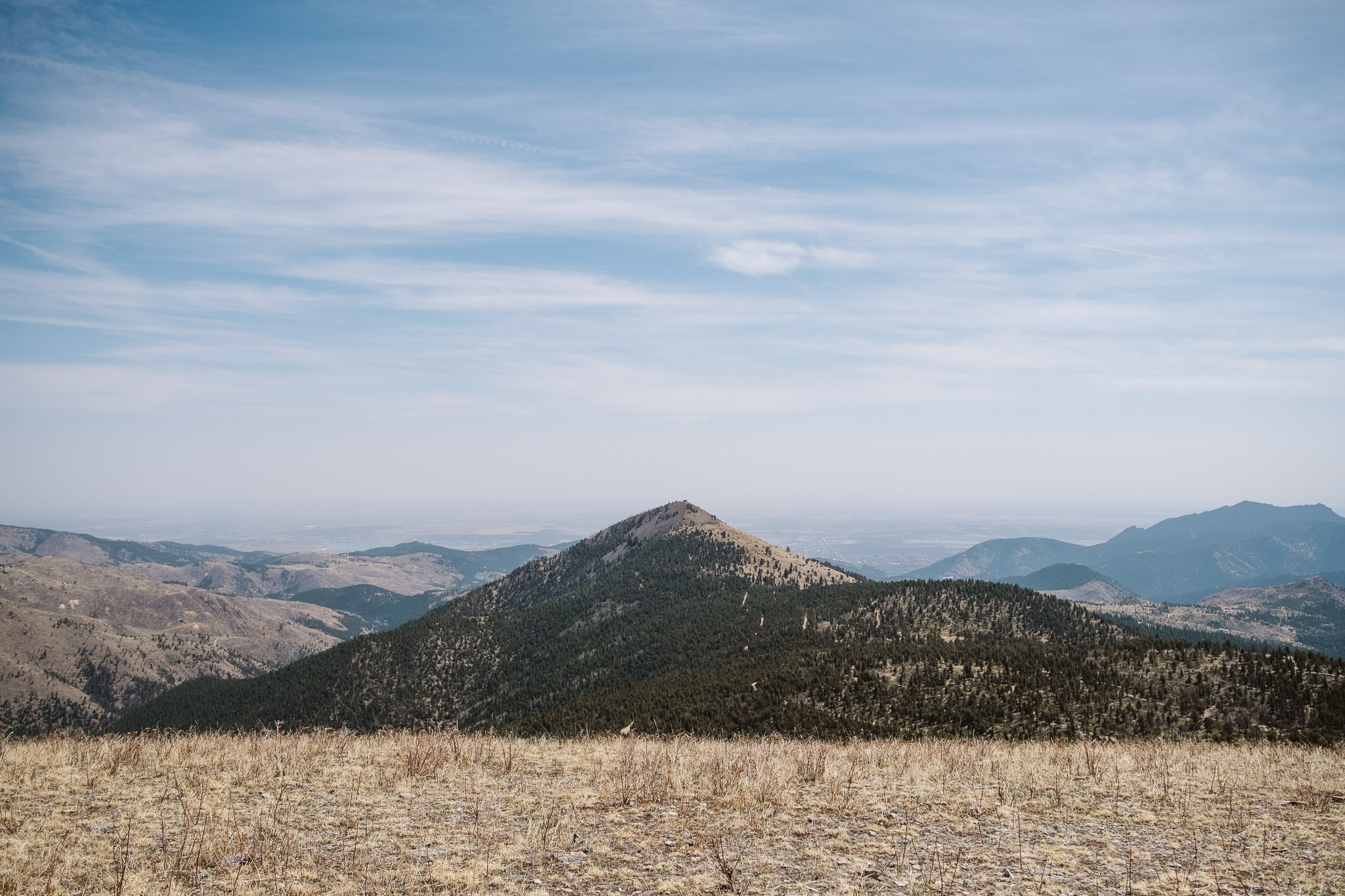
Sugarloaf Mountain in Colorado

Sugarloaf is located in south-central Boulder County, approximately halfway between Boulder and Nederland. It is bordered by the Mountain Meadows CDP to the northeast, and North Boulder Creek forms part of the southern edge of the community. Sugarloaf Road is the main route through the CDP.

The Sugarloaf CDP has an area of 1,394 acres (5.640 km^{2}), all land.

== Demographics ==
The United States Census Bureau initially defined the Sugarloaf CDP for the United States Census 2010.

Sugarloaf CDP, Colorado
Year	Pop.	±%
2010	261	—
2020	274	+5.0%
Source: United States Census Bureau

== Town organizations and events ==
Sugarloaf has a volunteer fire department—as of 2019, the department typically runs 30 to 45 members—which is a part of the Sugar Loaf Fire Protection District (SLFPD) covering approximately 17 square miles (44 km^{2}) of territory, 500 homes, with land between 6,000 to 8,500 ft (1,800 to 2,600 m) elevation in mountainous terrain. The VFD was initially formed in 1967, and in 2019, serves approximately 1400 persons.

== See also ==
- Boulder, CO Metropolitan Statistical Area
