= Poplar Walk =

Footpath in Oxford, England

Coordinates: 51°44′51.7″N 1°15′15.5″W

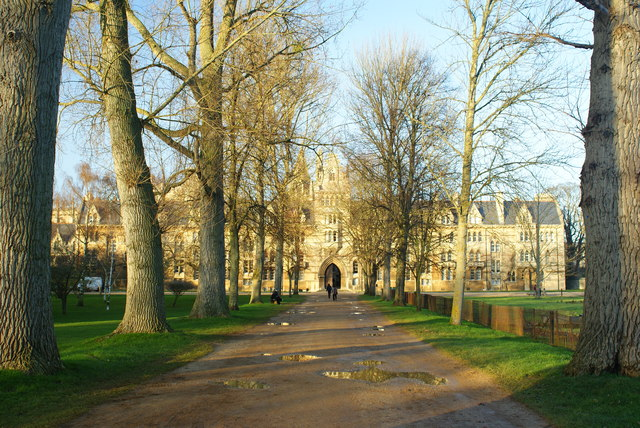
View north along Poplar Walk, with The Meadow Building in the distance.

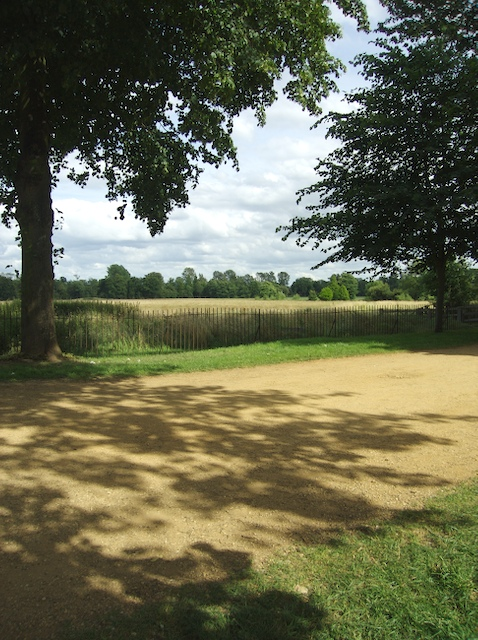
View from Poplar Walk of Christ Church Meadow.

Poplar Walk is wide footpath running north–south in Christ Church Meadow, Oxford, England.

The footpath runs between The Meadow Building of Christ Church at the junction with Broad Walk to the north and the River Thames near Folly Bridge to the south. At this point, the river is known as "The Isis" and is the location of the end of rowing races for Oxford University events such as Eights Week in the summer and Torpids in the spring. There used to be ornate wooden barges on the river here to house rowing facilities and for viewing races. Now the barges are gone and there are boathouses instead a little further down the river near the junction with the River Cherwell. Poplar Walk is still used as a route to and from the boathouses. There are good rural views to the east across Christ Church Meadow, even though Poplar Walk is quite centrally located in Oxford.

Poplar Walk was laid out in 1872 and lined with poplar trees by Henry Liddell, Dean of Christ Church and the father of Alice Liddell of Alice in Wonderland fame.

Postwar development planned for central Oxford included a relief road passing through the northern part of Christ Church Meadow and joining the district of St Ebbe's. It would have cut off the northern end of Poplar Walk. The proposal was defeated after strong opposition.

== See also ==
- "Binsey Poplars", an 1879 poem by Gerard Manley Hopkins
- Christ Church War Memorial Garden, near the northern end of Poplar Walk
