= Mountain Meadows, Colorado =

Census-designated place in Boulder County, CO, USA

- Census-designated place
- Location of the Mountain Meadows CDP in Boulder County, Colorado
- Coordinates: 40°01′35″N 105°22′35″W
- Country: United States
- State: Colorado
- County: Boulder County

Government
  - Type: unincorporated community

Area
  - Total: 1.723 sq mi (4.462 km^{2})
  - Land: 1.723 sq mi (4.462 km^{2})
  - Water: 0 sq mi (0.000 km^{2})
- Elevation: 7,448 ft (2,270 m)

Population (2020)
  - Total: 237
  - Density: 138/sq mi (53.1/km^{2})
- Time zone: UTC-7 (MST)
  - Summer (DST): UTC-6 (MDT)
- ZIP Code: Boulder 80302
- Area codes: 303 & 720
- GNIS feature ID: 2583269

Mountain Meadows is an unincorporated community and a census-designated place (CDP) located in and governed by Boulder County, Colorado, United States. The CDP is a part of the Boulder, CO Metropolitan Statistical Area. The population of the Mountain Meadows CDP was 237 at the United States Census 2020. The Boulder post office (Zip Code 80302) serves the area.

== Geography ==
Mountain Meadows is located in south-central Boulder County in the hills west of the city of Boulder. Primary access is via Sugarloaf Road from Boulder Canyon Drive (State Highway 119). The CDP is bordered by Crisman to the northeast and Sugarloaf to the southwest.

The Mountain Meadows CDP has an area of 1,103 acres (4.462 km^{2}), all land.

== Demographics ==
The United States Census Bureau initially defined the Mountain Meadows CDP for the United States Census 2010.

Mountain Meadows CDP, Colorado
| Year | Pop. | ±% |
|---|---|---|
| 2010 | 274 | — |
| 2020 | 237 | −13.5% |
Source: United States Census Bureau

== See also ==
- Boulder, CO Metropolitan Statistical Area
