= James Meadows Rendel =

James Meadows Rendel may refer to:

- James Meadows Rendel (engineer) (1799–1856), British civil engineer
- James Meadows Rendel (geneticist) (1915–2001), Australian geneticist
