= Mountain Meadow Ranch =

Summer camp in California, United States

Coordinates: 40°20′28″N 120°35′9″W

Mountain Meadow Ranch (MMR) is a family-owned two-week summer camp for boys and girls aged 7–17, located near Susanville, California, United States, on the eastern slope of the Sierra Nevada, 75 miles northwest of Reno, Nevada. It boasts one of the highest return rates of any camp, averaging about 70% campers returning the next year.

== History ==
Originally a hunting camp for the indigenous Maidu Native Americans, in 1902 the ranch came under the ownership of wealthy hunter George Wingfield, who first homesteaded the area. The ranch was called "Meadowbrook" at this time, and had two small "lakes" nearby named "Lake George" (right next to the big house) and "Lake Jean", after George Wingfield's children. After going through several changes, Mountain Meadow Ranch was founded as an all-boys summer camp in 1956 by professional football player Jack Ellena Sr. and his wife Jacquie Ellena when they acquired it shortly after Jack graduated from UCLA. At the insistence of sisters, the camp opened to girls in the early 1960s, and it has been open to both sexes ever since.

== Activities ==
Mountain Meadow offers a wide range of activities, including:

- Equestrianism
- Mountain biking
- BMX biking
- Riflery
- Archery
- Tennis
- Drama
- Ceramics
- Arts and crafts
- Photography
- Swimming
- Sailing
- Canoeing
- Fishing
- Fencing
- Campfires
- Basketball
- Baseball
- Association football
- American football
- Lake sports
  - Water skiing
  - Wakeboarding
  - Kneeboarding
  - Tubing
- Adventure and challenge activities
  - High ropes course
  - Low ropes course
  - Backpacking trips
  - Water-ski overnights
  - Archeology expeditions
  - Desert adventures
  - Summit expeditions
  - C.I.L.T. (Campers in Leadership Training)

== Staff and directors ==
The ranch is owned by Jack "Chip" Ellena Jr. and wife Jody Ellena, who have been running the camp as head directors since 1993. Co-directors are their daughter Katherine & Brandon Whitestone. The staff and counselors at Mountain Meadow are typically between the ages of 19-24 and most have completed at least one year of college.
