= Rob Meadows =

American Internet entrepreneur (born 1976)

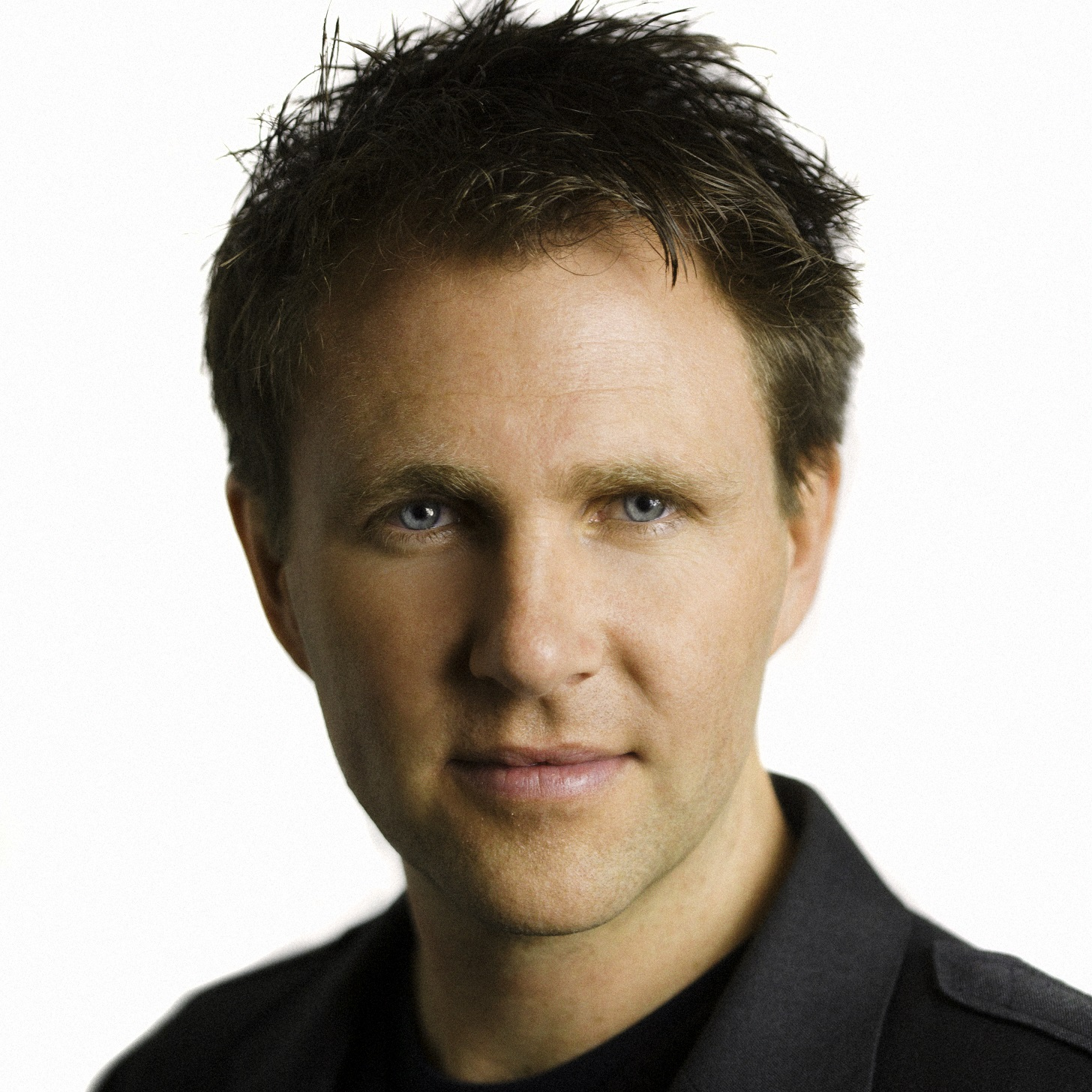
- Born: Robert Marc Meadows; December 26, 1976 (age 49); Tarzana, California, U.S.
- Education: Bonanza High School; University of Arizona
- Occupations: CEO, AI Foundation

Rob Meadows (born December 26, 1976) is an American Internet entrepreneur who founded the AI Foundation, Originate, and Lumitrend. He has also served as a CTO and Advisor to several other technology startups and has spoken about artificial intelligence at conferences such as CES and South by Southwest.

== Personal life ==
Meadows was born in Tarzana, California, and lived in Canyon Country, California, before his family moved to Las Vegas, Nevada, where he spent most of his childhood. Meadows graduated from Bonanza High School in Las Vegas in 1995. He then attended the University of Arizona where he received a bachelor's degree in computer engineering in 1999 and a master's degree in computer science in 2000. During his time at Arizona, he worked at IBM and was President of Kappa Sigma fraternity. After graduating, Meadows moved to Silicon Valley to work for the dot-com startup Slam Dunk Networks.

== Career ==
In 2001, Meadows founded Meadows Consulting Corporation (MCC) which provided mobile development services for Fortune 500 companies including Qualcomm, Amazon, and Amadeus.

In 2003, Meadows co-founded Lumitrend and was CEO of the company until its acquisition by Asurion in August 2006. Post acquisition, Meadows became the Director of Products at Asurion.

In 2007, Meadows founded Originate and served as CEO until 2016. While at Originate, he held several roles at portfolio companies including Co-founder and Chairman of THRIVE, Executive at NewAer, CTO of Stateless Networks, and CTO and board member of Best of All Worlds.

In 2017, Meadows co-founded the AI Foundation and currently serves as its CEO. The AI Foundation's mission is to move humanity forward through the power of decentralized, trusted, personal AI, while anticipating and counteracting the risks of AI’s proliferation in society.
