= The Meadows =

The Meadows may refer to:

== Places ==
=== Municipalities and locales ===
- The Meadows (Key West), a neighborhood in Key West, Florida, United States
- The Meadows, Castle Rock, Colorado, a community in the United States
- The Meadows, Edmonton, a residential district in Edmonton, Alberta, Canada
- The Meadows, Florida, a census-designated place (CDP) in Sarasota County, Florida, United States
- The Meadows, Nottingham, an area of Nottingham, England
- The Meadows, Virginia, an unincorporated community in Northampton County, Virginia, United States
- The Meadows, a wetland area adjacent to the River Dee in Chester, England

=== Listings on the U.S. National Register of Historic Places ===
- The Meadows (Battleboro, North Carolina), listed on the NRHP in North Carolina
- The Meadows (Fletcher, North Carolina), listed on the NRHP in North Carolina
- The Meadows (Franklin, New Jersey), listed on the NRHP in New Jersey
- The Meadows (Moorefield, West Virginia), listed on the NRHP in West Virginia
- The Meadows (Owings Mills, Maryland), listed on the NRHP in Maryland

=== Other places ===
- The Meadows, Edinburgh, public park in Scotland
- The Meadows at Grand Valley State University, golf course in Michigan
- The Meadows Greyhounds, dog racing track in Melbourne, Australia
- The Meadows Music Theatre, concert venue in Hartford, Connecticut

== Businesses and enterprises ==
- The Meadows Casino & Hotel, a defunct hotel-casino in the Las Vegas, Nevada area
- The Meadows Foundation (Dallas), a private philanthropic institution in Texas
- The Meadows Music & Arts Festival, former festival in New York City
- Hollywood Casino at The Meadows, a racino combining the original (1963) ongoing horse racing track The Meadows and added (2007) casino in Washington County, Pennsylvania

== Schools ==
- The Meadows Elementary School (DeSoto, Texas), a public school in DeSoto, Texas
- The Meadows School, a private school in Las Vegas, Nevada
- The Meadows School, Leek, a special school in Leek, Staffordshire, England

== See also ==
- Meadow (disambiguation)
- Meadowlands (disambiguation)
- Mountain Meadows (disambiguation)
- Mountain Meadow (disambiguation)
