= Peter S. Meadows =

Marine Biologist and Lecturer

Peter S. Meadows was a British marine biologist and an Honorary Lecturer in the Institute of Biomedical and Life Sciences at The University of Glasgow.

Along with his wife, Azra Meadows, he has carried out extensive work of an environmental, cultural and educational nature in Pakistan, and in 2005 was awarded the Sitara-i-Quaid-i-Azam (Star of the Great Leader), one of the highest civilian medals of that country, for services to Pakistan.

Peter Meadows and Azra Meadows were the editors of The Glasgow Naturalist, the annual publication of The Glasgow Natural History Society.

== Cultural initiatives ==
Amongst the projects in which Meadows and Azra Meadows have played a significant role is the Connecting Futures:Student Dialogues programme.

Conceived by the Foreign and Commonwealth Office and the British Council, the aim of the initiative was to foster an understanding between the cultural backgrounds of students from the UK and those of Muslim countries, as part of which a delegation of sixteen students from the UK – four from The University of Glasgow, four from the University of Edinburgh, four from the University of Warwick and four from Cardiff University – visited Pakistan in 2005.

The Meadows, as well as facilitating the preparations for the delegation of Glasgow students – Anna Chiumento, Gary Sergeant, Zoe Nisbet and Tommy Ga-Ken Wan – have ensured that the value, purpose and success of the initiative is not forgotten. This has been done by arranging and assisting the students from Glasgow University to deliver, on several occasions, a lecture entitled Bridging the Divide: Myths and Realities, describing their experiences in Pakistan and their impact. At the invitation of Maliha Lodhi, the High Commissioner of Pakistan to the United Kingdom, the lecture was delivered in September 2005 to an audience at the High Commission of Pakistan in London.
