= Isabel Meadows =

Last speaker of Rumsen language (1846–1939)

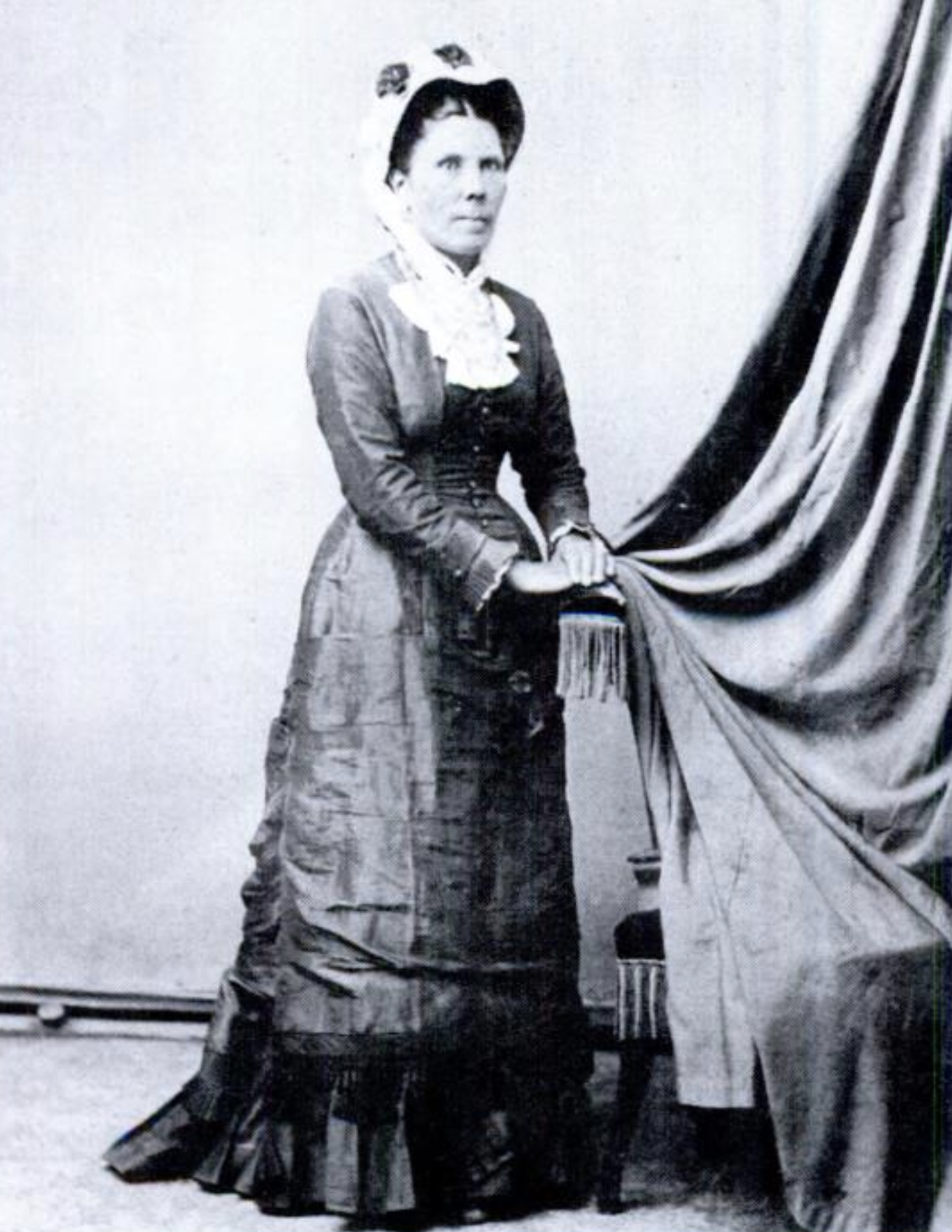
- Isabel Meadows in her 40s, circa 1890
- Born: July 7, 1846; Carmel Valley, California
- Died: May 21, 1939 (aged 92); Washington, D.C.
- Citizenship: Rumsen Ohlone
- Known for: Last fluent speaker of the Rumsen Ohlone language

Isabel Meadows (July 7, 1846 – May 21, 1939) was an Ohlone ethnologist and the last fluent speaker of the Rumsen Ohlone language. She also spoke Esselen. She worked closely with the anthropologists from the Smithsonian Institution for more than five years in order to document her culture and language. Her work is considered fundamental in the study of Ohlone languages.

== Family ==
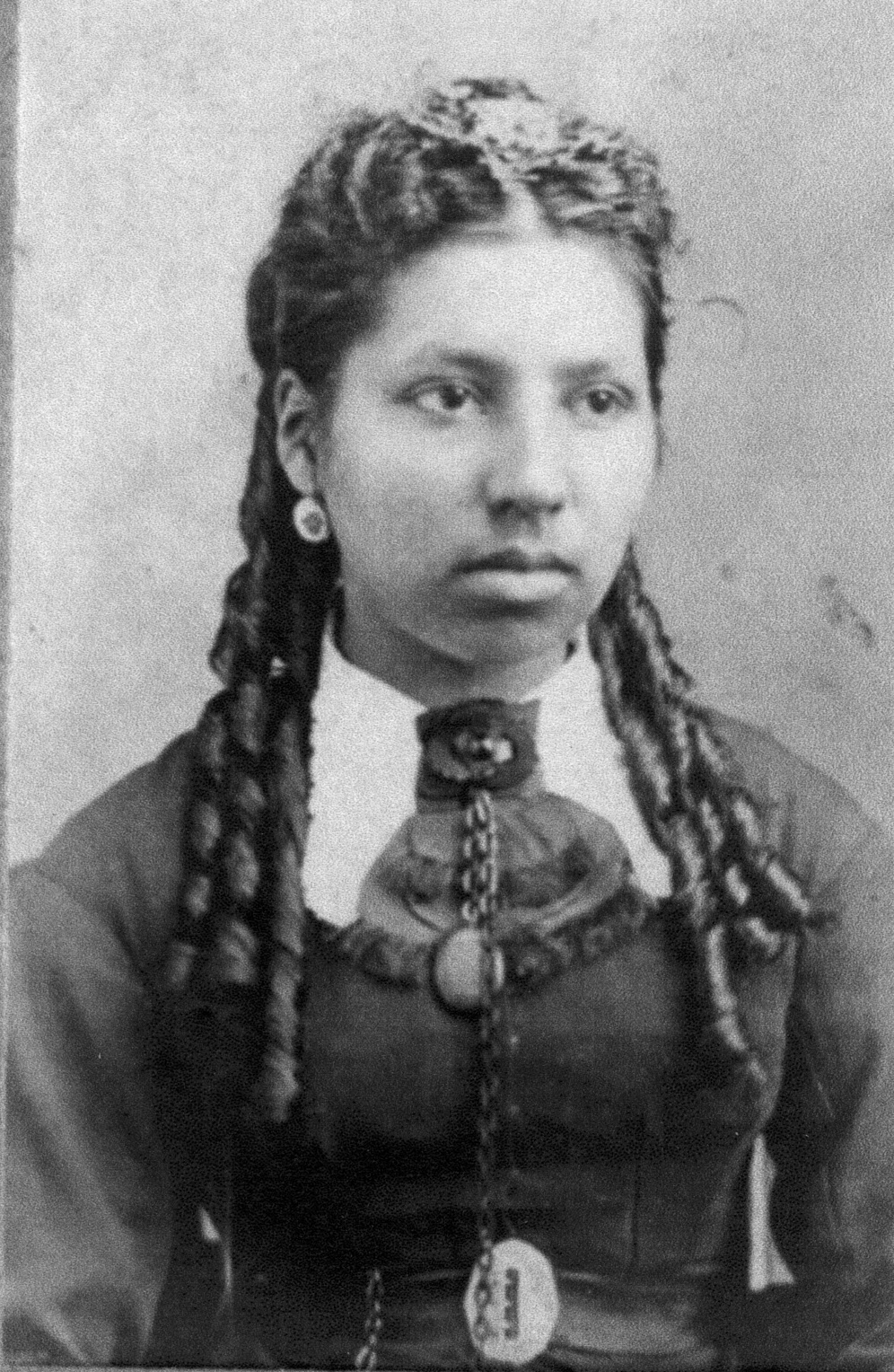
Meadows as a young woman (c. 1880)

Isabel Meadows was born on July 7, 1846, in Carmel Valley, California. Her father, James Meadows (1817–1902), was a whaler originally from Great Yarmouth, Norfolk, England. He later owned a James Meadows Tract in upper Carmel Valley in the vicinity of a cave in which an Esselen child was found buried in 1952. Her mother, Maria Loreta Onésimo, was Rumsen and Esselen, and like Isabel one of the last native Rumsen speakers. She was the daughter of Juan Onésimo, and had previously been married to Domingo Peralta. Isabel had four brothers, Frank (Francisco) Meadows, Edward (Edwardo) Lion Meadows, James Meadows Jr., and Thomas Porter Meadows. Isabel's great-grandmother Lupecina Francesa Unegte had been baptized at the Mission San Carlos Borromeo in 1792, when about eight hundred Native Americans lived there. William Brainard Post worked on Meadows Ranch and married Meadows's aunt Anselma in 1850.

She spoke of her childhood community as a disordered and traumatized one, featuring abuse, abandonment and addiction, the latter resulting from pain and ending in death, she said.

Due in part to her ancestry and childhood, she was competent to fluent in Rumsen, English, and Spanish, also speaking limited Esselen. Meadows is known as the last fluent speaker of the Rumsen Ohlone language, which was commonly spoken along the Central Coast of California prior to the arrival of the Spanish. After she died, her body was returned to Carmel for a memorial service. She was survived by one brother, Thomas Meadows of Monterey, and his children.

== Smithsonian collaboration ==
In her later years and until her death, Meadows worked closely with Smithsonian ethnologist J. P. Harrington and shared her knowledge of her tribe's culture and languages in the Monterey, Carmel, and Big Sur regions of California. Drawing upon her ancestry, she provided oral history on the likes of Spanish missions, ranchos, and the California Gold Rush. His primary correspondent, their work was extensive and comprehensive. He insisted upon her input and their affairs were amicable as she provided personal tales, per her desire, and the fundamentals Harrington sought. She credited the fatal effect alcoholism had on her community with the lack of preservation for the Rumsen Ohlone language.

Harrington's practice functioned as salvage ethnography; Meadows was "one of the last survivors who could retrace the sweeping and succeeding colonial forms of violence by the Spanish, Mexican and U.S. American imperial and settler colonial systems in California".

Deborah A. Miranda noted that much of Meadows's recollection functions as gossip, although expressing solidarity rather than judgement. She spoke passionately in remembrance of a rape, information which was likely disseminated by gossip.

== Death ==
Meadows and Harrington worked together until the end of her life, on May 20, 1939, at age 94, in Washington, D.C. In 1949, the Meadows Cave was observed by a survey party under the direction of A.R. Piling, then assistant Archaeologist of the U.C. Archaeological Survey. The cave was renamed after Meadows, as the last known informant on the Esselen Native Americans.
