= The Meadow Building =

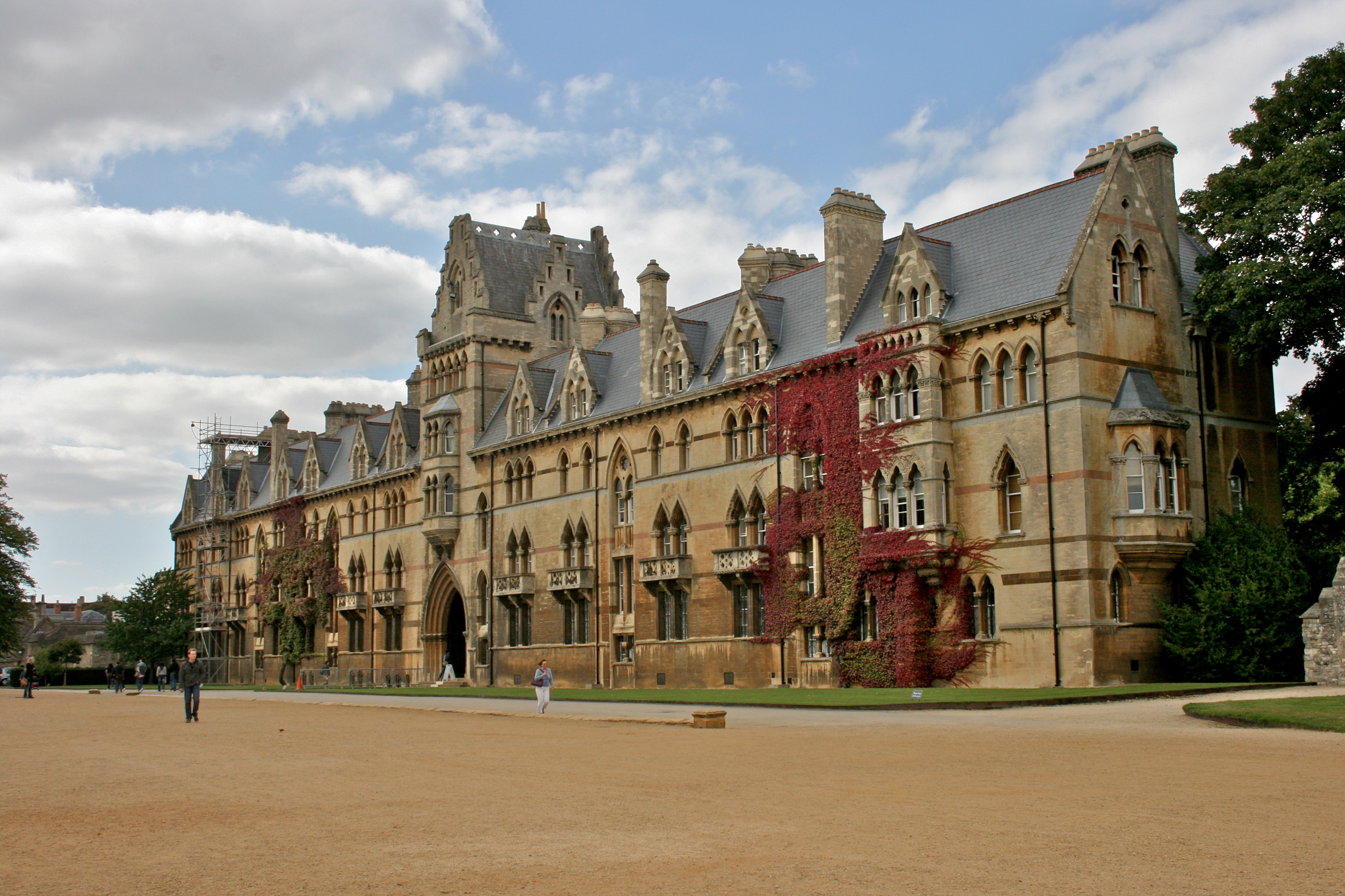
- Interactive map of the The Meadow Building area

General information
- Architectural style: Venetian
- Location: St Aldate's, Oxfordshire, England
- Coordinates: 51.749444°N 1.254444°W
- Year built: 1862–66

Design and construction
- Architect: Thomas Deane

Listed Building – Grade II
- Official name: Christchurch, Meadow Buildings
- Designated: 29 January 1968
- Reference no.: 1198863

The Meadow Building (known as "Meadows" to students, aka Meadow Buildings) is part of Christ Church, Oxford, England, one of the Oxford colleges, looking out south onto Christ Church Meadow on Broad Walk and then along the straight tree-lined Poplar Walk to the River Thames.

The building is used as the public entrance for paying visitors to Christ Church instead of the main entrance under Tom Tower in St Aldate's.

== History and description ==
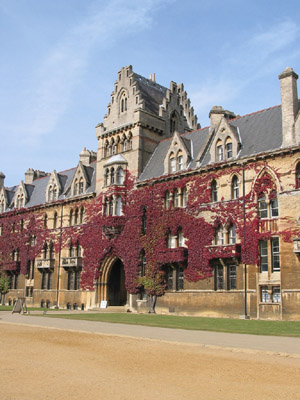
The Meadow Building, Christ Church

The building was constructed in 1862–66 to the designs of Sir Thomas Deane of Dublin in the Venetian style (favoured by the Christ Church art historian John Ruskin). Single rooms in the Meadow Building look out over either the college or the Christ Church Meadow, although originally, college undergraduates would be given a suite of rooms with views overlooking both sides. Recent building work has converted most of these rooms to ensuite while leaving one staircase, which is primarily non-residential, as was.

When it was first built, the relative distance of the Meadow Building from the more fashionable Peckwater and Canterbury Quads meant that it was considered the least desirable accommodation in college.

Pevsner described it as a "joyless building".

== Literary references ==
The building has featured in a number of books:

"So I found myself installed in delightfully spacious rooms within the Victorian wing of an elegant Tudor college, with the beauty of the Christ Church Meadow spread panoramically on the other side of my window panes. The Meadows block was more tranquil in spirit than the rowdier atmosphere of Peckwater."

"I discovered the huge and ungainly pile of Ruskinian Gothic known as Meadow Building, where I would be spending the next two years. […] Blissfully ignorant of the social geography of the House, I did not realize that I had been relegated to the furthest outpost of the college demesne. From the lofty vantage point of the Old Etonians and Old Harrovians who lived in Peckwater and Canterbury I might just as well have been relegated to Siberia. My sitting room lay on the top floor of the last entry in Meadow Building."

"Sebastian lived at Christ Church, high in Meadow Buildings. He was alone when I came, peeling a plover's egg taken from the large nest of moss in the centre of the table."

== Gallery ==
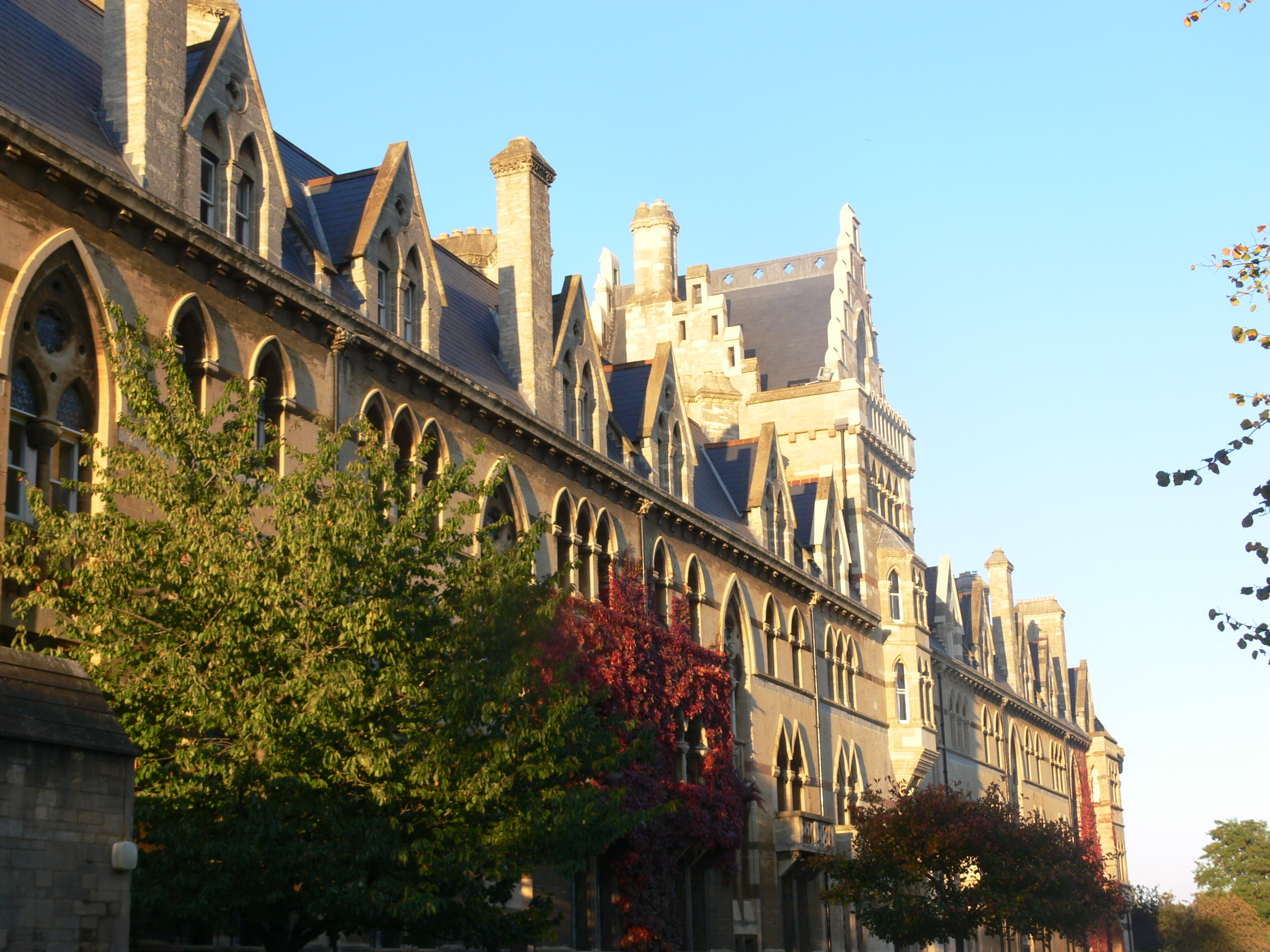
South facade of the building.

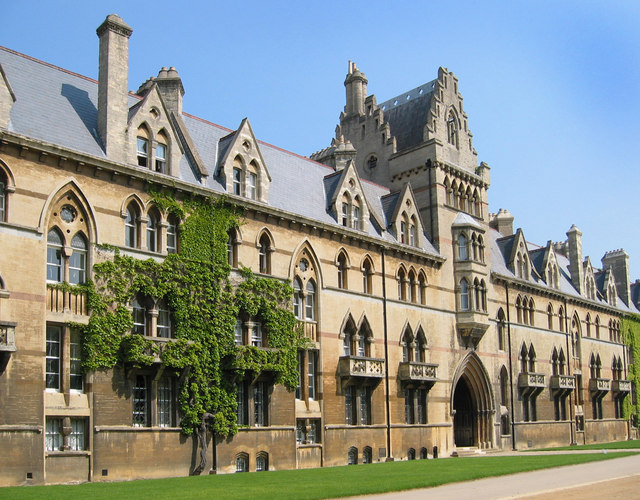
View looking northeast.

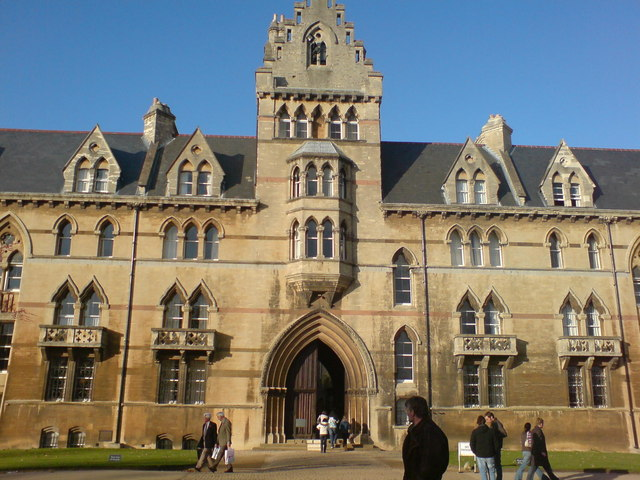
View from immediately to its south.

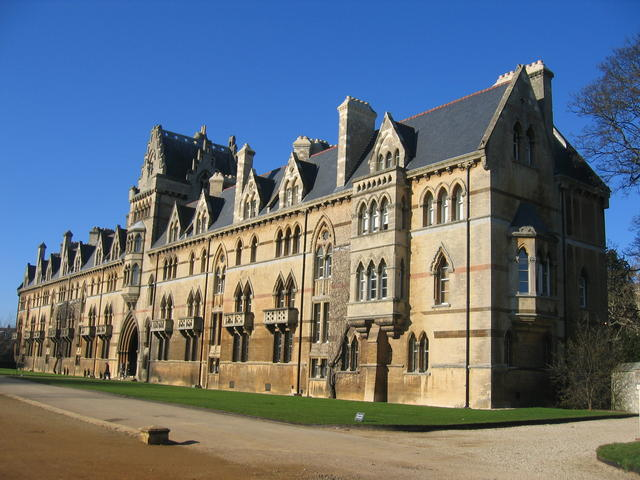
View looking northwest, back towards St Aldate's Street.

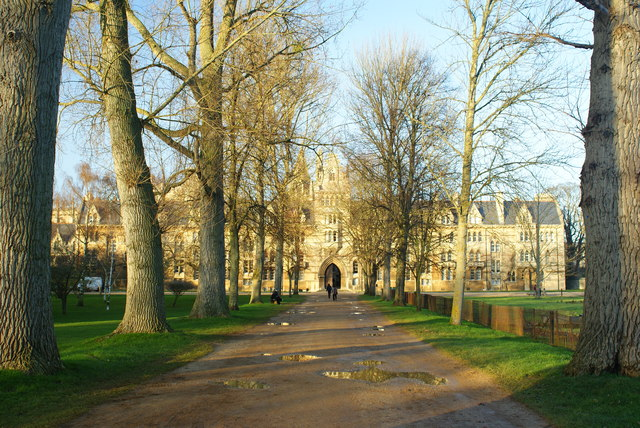
View from the south along Poplar Walk, looking across Broad Walk.

== See also ==
- Venetian Gothic
- Tom Quad
- Peckwater Quadrangle
- Blue Boar Quadrangle
- Christ Church Library
