= Meadowlands =

Meadowlands or The Meadowlands may refer to:

== Places ==
=== United States ===
==== Minnesota ====
- Meadowlands, Minnesota, a city in Minnesota
- Meadowlands Township, St. Louis County, Minnesota, a township in Minnesota

==== New Jersey ====
- New Jersey Meadowlands, the name for a wetlands and its surrounding area in the north-east of the state
  - Meadowlands Environment Center, an educational facility
  - Meadowlands Grand Prix, a CART series race held in New Jersey
  - Meadowlands Rail Line, a New Jersey Transit rail line
  - Meadowlands Sports Complex in East Rutherford, New Jersey, named for the wetlands, which consists of:
    - Meadowlands (NJT station)
    - American Dream Meadowlands, a proposed retail center and entertainment complex
    - Meadowlands Arena
    - Meadowlands Racetrack
    - MetLife Stadium, the new Giants and Jets Stadium that replaced the since demolished Giants Stadium
  - New Jersey Meadowlands Commission, regulatory agency that manages the New Jersey Meadowlands
- Category:New Jersey Meadowlands District

=== Elsewhere ===
- Meadowlands, Gauteng, a suburb of Johannesburg, South Africa
- Meadowlands, Hamilton, Ontario, a neighborhood in Canada
- Meadowlands, the commercial centre of Somerville, a suburb of Auckland, New Zealand

== Arts, entertainment, and media ==
=== Music ===
- The Meadowlands (album), a 2003 album by The Wrens
- "Polyushko Pole", Russian song also known as "Meadowland"
- Meadowlands (song), South African song about apartheid

=== Television ===
- Meadowlands (TV series), a British television series also known as Cape Wrath
- "Meadowlands" (The Sopranos), an episode of the television series The Sopranos

=== Other arts, entertainment, and media ===
- Meadowland (film), a 2015 American drama film
- Meadowlands (poetry collection), a 1997 poetry book by Louise Glück
