= Meadow (disambiguation) =

A meadow is a habitat where grasses predominate.

Meadow may also refer to:

== Places ==
=== Slovenia ===
- Meadow 1, Meadow 2, sites of mass graves in Spodnje Gorje

=== United States ===
- Meadow, Nebraska, an unincorporated community
- Meadow, South Dakota, an unincorporated community
- Meadow, Texas, a town
- Meadow, Utah, a town
- Meadow Township, Clay County, Iowa
- Meadow Township, Wadena County, Minnesota
- Peacocks Crossroads, North Carolina, formerly called Meadow

== People ==
- Herb Meadow (1911–1995), American television producer and writer
- Roy Meadow (born 1933), British paediatrician
- Stephanie Meadow (born 1992), golfer
- Meadow Sisto (born 1972), American actress

== Arts and entertainment ==
- "Meadow" (song), a 2017 single by rock band Stone Temple Pilots
- The Meadow (film) (Il prato), a 1979 Italian film
- The Meadow (play), a 1947 radio drama by Ray Bradbury
- The Meadow, a poetry collection by James Galvin
- Meadow Soprano, a character in the drama The Sopranos

== Other uses ==
- Meadow (calf), a bovine calf fitted with double prosthetics
- Meadow (programming), an open source programming project
- ST Meadow, a tugboat

== See also ==
- Meadows (disambiguation)
- The Meadows (disambiguation)
- Mountain Meadow (disambiguation)
