= James Meadows (pioneer) =

Irish-born pioneer

- English-born James Meadows (1817–1902)
- Born: March 2, 1817; Great Yarmouth, Norfolk, England
- Died: July 13, 1902 (aged 85); Carmel Valley, California, US
- Occupations: Farmer, dairyman
- Spouse: Maria Loretta Onesimo
- Children: 5

James Meadows (March 2, 1817 – July 13, 1902), was an English-born immigrant who moved to California in 1838. He was the oldest pioneer in Monterey County, California at his death. He donated land and helped build the Carmelo School, which was the earliest school in Carmel Valley, California. His daughter, Isabel Meadows, was an Ohlone ethnologist and the last fluent speaker of the Rumsen Ohlone language.

== Early life ==
James Meadows was born on March 2, 1817, in the seaport town of Great Yarmouth, in Norfolk, England. He left home at an early age and went to sea as an apprentice on board a collier ship. He then left London, England in March 1835, at age 18, on the whaling ship Indian. After 2 1/2 years he and a friend, William Anderson, father of former Assessor Anderson of Castroville, deserted his ship at the Monterey Harbor in 1837 because of cruel treatment they had received. They took refuge with Domingo Peralta and his family until his ship left the Monterey Bay. Loreta was born at the Carmel Mission.

== Career ==
Meadows took his first job as vaquero for Captain Juan Bautista Roger Cooper on Rancho El Sur in Monterey County in Big Sur for 2 1/2 years during the Mexican rule in California. During his time there he became associated with the saloon of Isaac Graham, a hideout for deserters from foreign ships.

In July 1841, Meadows obtained clemency and was returned from Mexico, with a group of 20. He became associated with General Bidwell on the Feather River in Sacramento County, California. He said that Bidwell, Pitts, and he and his companions "discovered gold there before James Marshall, but kept it a secret."

== Family ==
Meadows returned to Monterey and went back to visit the Peralta family when he found out that his friend Domingo Peralta had mysteriously been found dead. In 1842, Meadows married Maria Loreta Onésimo in Monterey, California, the widow of Domingo Peralta, and took responsibility for the land she was given by the mission padres. Meadows and Loreta had five children together, Francisco, Isabel, Edwardo,; James A. Jr. and Thomas Porter. Isabel, "Aunt Belle," learned to speak the native Rumsen language from her mother, Loreta Onésimo, spoken by the Ohlone people. In 1933, at age 87, Isabel was invited to Washington D.C., to assist John Peabody Harrington an ethnologist of the Smithsonian Institution's Bureau of American Ethnology with his research on the Rumsen life, language, and culture in the Carmel Valley and Big Sur regions. Isabel was last known speaker of their language. They worked together until she died on May 20, 1939, at age 94, in Washington D.C.

=== James Meadows Tract ===
Map indicating James Meadows land grant, 1898.

Hand-drawn diseño (map) of James Meadows Ranch Layout supporting land claim, No. 159 S.D.

On December 28, 1858, Meadows became an American citizen. Before his wife's father, Juan Onésimo died in 1860, Meadows filed a claim for the Palo Escrito land grant on November 5, 1869, with the Public Land Commission. He received the legal land serial patent on August 9, 1866, that became known as the Meadows Tract for 4,591.71 acres (1,858.20 ha). Its boundaries were between the Rancho Cañada de la Segunda to the west, Rancho Los Laureles to the northeast, and Garland Ranch Regional Park to the south. On the property Meadows had a dairy where he hired jobless Chinese workers. He built an adobe house near the Carmel River.

=== Carmelo School ===
Carmelo School. This June 10, 1920 photograph shows the graduating class: Emily Martin Williams, fourth from let, was the granddaughter of William Hatton and John Martin.

Carmelo School June 2, 1916.

Meadows donated land and helped establish what was first called the Meadows School, and later renamed the Carmelo School. It was the earliest school in Carmel Valley. He was a trustee of the Carmelo School District until his death.

James Meadows is next to his wife on far left. The Day of San Carlos by Joseph D. Strong (1879).

On San Carlos Day, November 4, 1879, Scottish novelist Robert Louis Stevenson visited the Carmel Mission to hear the a mass at the church that had fallen into disrepair. A drawing by Joseph D. Strong shows Jules Simeenau, Meadows and his wife, and Father Angel Delfino Casanova standing in front of the church.

== Death ==
Meadows died on July 13, 1902, at his home in Carmel Valley, California. His funeral took place at the San Carlos church and he was buried in the cemetery in Monterey, California. He left an estate of 4,500 acres (1,800 ha) acres with assets worth over $150,000 (equivalent to $5,581,731 in 2025). His oldest son, Frank contested the Will because his father left him only $2,000 (equivalent to $74,423 in 2025).

== See also ==
- Timeline of Carmel-by-the-Sea, California
- Ranchos of California
- List of Ranchos of California
