= Johnny Meadows (Australian footballer) =

Australian rules footballer

Personal information
- Full name: John Wylie Meadows
- Born: 25 July 1880; Violet Town, Victoria
- Died: 5 April 1974 (aged 93); Malvern, Victoria

Playing career^{1}
Years	Club	Games (Goals)
1903	Essendon	4 (2)
- ^{1} Playing statistics correct to the end of 1903.

John Wylie Meadows (25 July 1880 – 5 April 1974) was an Australian rules footballer who played with Essendon in the Victorian Football League (VFL).
