= Listed buildings in Oxford (centre, eastern part) =

Buildings in Oxford, Oxfordshire, England

Oxford is a city and non-civil parish in Oxfordshire, England. It contains 1,147 listed buildings that are recorded in the National Heritage List for England. Of these 198 are grade I, 78 are grade II* and 871 are grade II.

This list is based on the information retrieved online from Historic England. The quantity of listed buildings in Oxford requires subdivision into geographically defined lists. This list includes all listed buildings in the eastern part of the city centre.

== Key ==
| Grade | Criteria |
|---|---|
| I | Buildings that are of exceptional interest |
| II* | Particularly important buildings of more than special interest |
| II | Buildings that are of special interest |

== Listing ==
=== City Walls ===
| Name | Grade | Location | Type | Completed (Note: The date given is the date used by Historic England as significant for the initial building or that of an important part in the structure's description.) | Date designated | Grid ref. (Note: The grid reference is based on the British national grid reference system, sometimes known as OSGB36, used by the Ordnance Survey.) Geo-coordinates | Notes | Entry number (Note: The "List Entry Number" is a unique number assigned to each listed building and scheduled monument by Historic England.) | Image | Wikidata |
|---|---|---|---|---|---|---|---|---|---|---|
| Wall, South Side Of St Helens Passage | I | Catte Street, City Wall | | | 12 January 1954 | SP5162606479; 51°45′17″N 1°15′13″W | | 1300145 | Wall, South Side Of St Helens Passage | Q17528732 |
| Wall East of Bastion 12 | I | New College, City Wall | | | 12 January 1954 | SP5185006448; 51°45′16″N 1°15′01″W | | 1184468 | Wall East of Bastion 12 | Q17528615 |
| Wall South of Bastion 14 | I | New College, City Wall | | | 12 January 1954 | SP5193506398; 51°45′14″N 1°14′56″W | | 1046613 | Wall South of Bastion 14 | Q17528309 |
| Wall to East of Bastion 11 | I | New College, City Wall2 | | | 12 January 1954 | SP5179106455; 51°45′16″N 1°15′04″W | | 1184453 | Wall to East of Bastion 11 | Q17528608 |
| Wall to East of Bell Tower | I | New College, City Wall | | | 12 January 1954 | SP5172606465; 51°45′16″N 1°15′07″W | | 1046610 | Wall to East of Bell Tower | Q17528298 |
| Wall, East Of Bastion 13 | I | New College, City Wall | | | 12 January 1954 | SP5190906439; 51°45′15″N 1°14′58″W | | 1369706 | Wall, East Of Bastion 13 | Q17528885 |
| Wall, South Of Bastion 15 | I | New College, City Wall | | | 12 January 1954 | SP5193406344; 51°45′12″N 1°14′57″W | | 1369707 | Wall, South Of Bastion 15 | Q17528887 |
| Bastion 16 | I | St Edmund Hall, City Wall | | | 12 January 1954 | SP5194106306; 51°45′11″N 1°14′56″W | | 1046614 | Bastion 16 | Q17528313 |
| Wall, Short Length South Of Bastion 16 | I | St Edmund Hall, City Wall | | | 12 January 1954 | SP5193506298; 51°45′11″N 1°14′57″W | | 1300067 | Wall, Short Length South Of Bastion 16 | Q17528726 |
| Wall, East Of Bastion 20 | I | Christchurch, City Wall | | | 12 January 1954 | SP5185206060; 51°45′03″N 1°15′01″W | | 1046615 | Wall, East Of Bastion 20 More images | Q17528317 |
| Bastion 20 | I | Christ Church, City Wall | | | 12 January 1954 | SP5181706049; 51°45′03″N 1°15′03″W | | 1046578 | Bastion 20 More images | Q17528255 |
| Wall, West Of Bastion 20 | I | Christchurch, City Wall | | | 12 January 1954 | SP5178806041; 51°45′02″N 1°15′04″W | | 1369731 | Wall, West Of Bastion 20 More images | Q17528892 |
| Wall, South Of Summerhouse, Up To South East Angle | I | Merton College, City Wall | | | 12 January 1954 | SP5189006091; 51°45′04″N 1°14′59″W | | 1369708 | Wall, South Of Summerhouse, Up To South East Angle | Q17528889 |
| Wall, East Of Bastion 21 | I | City Wall, Corpus Christi | | | 12 January 1954 | SP5162905989; 51°45′01″N 1°15′13″W | | 1046579 | Wall, East Of Bastion 21 | Q17528259 |
| Bastion 21 | I | City Wall, Corpus Christi | | | 12 January 1954 | SP5159605977; 51°45′00″N 1°15′14″W | | 1046580 | Bastion 21 | Q17528264 |

=== All Souls College ===
| Name | Grade | Location | Type | Completed | Date designated | Grid ref. Geo-coordinates | Notes | Entry number | Image | Wikidata |
|---|---|---|---|---|---|---|---|---|---|---|
| All Souls College, Boundary Wall | II | New College Lane, All Souls College | | | 28 June 1972 | SP5169406400; 51°45′14″N 1°15′09″W | | 1046763 | All Souls College, Boundary Wall | Q26298853 |
| All Souls College, Boundary Wall With Queens College | II | All Souls College | | | 28 June 1972 | SP5170606373; 51°45′13″N 1°15′08″W | | 1046764 | Upload Photo | Q26298854 |
| All Souls College, Brewhouse Range | II | All Souls College | | | 12 January 1954 | SP5169906326; 51°45′12″N 1°15′09″W | | 1369620 | Upload Photo | Q26650939 |
| All Souls College, Central range on High Street between the South East range of Front Quadrangle and the Warden's Lodging | II | All Souls College | | | 28 June 1972 | SP5169906282; 51°45′10″N 1°15′09″W | | 1046757 | All Souls College, Central range on High Street between the South East range of Front Quadrangle and the Warden's Lodging | Q26298850 |
| All Souls College, East And West Ranges Of The North Quadrangle | I | All Souls College | | | 12 January 1954 | SP5162506346; 51°45′12″N 1°15′13″W | | 1046761 | All Souls College, East And West Ranges Of The North Quadrangle More images | Q17528500 |
| All Souls College, Front (Or South) Quadrangle, Including The Chapel And The South East Range On The High Street | I | All Souls College | | | 12 January 1954 | SP5163706305; 51°45′11″N 1°15′12″W | | 1046755 | All Souls College, Front (Or South) Quadrangle, Including The Chapel And The South East Range On The High Street More images | Q17528493 |
| All Souls College, Gateway to High Street at Eastern end of frontage | II | All Souls College | | | 28 June 1972 | SP5172706281; 51°45′10″N 1°15′07″W | | 1046758 | All Souls College, Gateway to High Street at Eastern end of frontage | Q26298851 |
| All Souls College, Hall, Kitchen, Buttery And Passage Between Hall And Kitchen | I | All Souls College | | | 12 January 1954 | SP5167606328; 51°45′12″N 1°15′10″W | | 1046760 | All Souls College, Hall, Kitchen, Buttery And Passage Between Hall And Kitchen | Q17528496 |
| All Souls College, The Codrington Library | I | All Souls College | | | 12 January 1954 | SP5164106386; 51°45′14″N 1°15′12″W | | 1046762 | All Souls College, The Codrington Library More images | Q5140364 |
| All Souls College, Wardens Lodging | II* | All Souls College | | | 12 January 1954 | SP5171106285; 51°45′10″N 1°15′08″W | | 1046756 | All Souls College, Wardens Lodging More images | Q17548493 |
| All Souls College, Wall in Stable Yard to North of Gateway running between Brewhouse Range and Warden's Lodging | II | All Souls College | | | 28 June 1972 | SP5172206308; 51°45′11″N 1°15′08″W | | 1046759 | Upload Photo | Q26298852 |

=== Brasenose College ===
| Name | Grade | Location | Type | Completed | Date designated | Grid ref. Geo-coordinates | Notes | Entry number | Image | Wikidata |
|---|---|---|---|---|---|---|---|---|---|---|
| Brasenose College, East Range, The Old Quadrangle | I | Brasenose College | | | 12 January 1954 | SP5156106322; 51°45′12″N 1°15′16″W | | 1369646 | Brasenose College, East Range, The Old Quadrangle More images | Q17528796 |
| Brasenose College, South Range, The Old Quadrangle | I | Brasenose College | | | 12 January 1954 | SP5154306315; 51°45′11″N 1°15′17″W | | 1369647 | Brasenose College, South Range, The Old Quadrangle | Q17528801 |
| Brasenose College, West Range, The Old Quadrangle | I | Brasenose College | | | 12 January 1954 | SP5151806327; 51°45′12″N 1°15′18″W | | 1046731 | Brasenose College, West Range, The Old Quadrangle More images | Q67152443 |
| Brasenose College, North Range, The Old Quadrangle | I | Brasenose College | | | 12 January 1954 | SP5153506350; 51°45′13″N 1°15′17″W | | 1046730 | Brasenose College, North Range, The Old Quadrangle More images | Q17528468 |
| Brasenose College, Library, Second Quadrangle | I | Brasenose College | | | 12 January 1954 | SP5156906303; 51°45′11″N 1°15′16″W | | 1046733 | Brasenose College, Library, Second Quadrangle | Q17528475 |
| Brasenose College, Chapel, Second Quadrangle | I | Brasenose College | | | 12 January 1954 | SP5156406285; 51°45′10″N 1°15′16″W | | 1369648 | Brasenose College, Chapel, Second Quadrangle More images | Q5073061 |
| Brasenose College, Little Cloister, Second Quadrangle | I | Brasenose College | | | 12 January 1954 | SP5156906303; 51°45′11″N 1°15′16″W | | 1369649 | Brasenose College, Little Cloister, Second Quadrangle More images | Q17528809 |
| Brasenose College, Kitchen Wing, Second Quadrangle | I | Brasenose College | | | 12 January 1954 | SP5154106301; 51°45′11″N 1°15′17″W | | 1046732 | Brasenose College, Kitchen Wing, Second Quadrangle | Q17528470 |
| Brasenose College, East Range and Eastern part of South Range, Third Quadrangle | II | Brasenose College | | | 29 January 1968 | SP5156406249; 51°45′09″N 1°15′16″W | | 1046735 | Brasenose College, East Range and Eastern part of South Range, Third Quadrangle More images | Q26298833 |
| Brasenose College, South West Angle, Third Quadrangle | II | Brasenose College | | | 29 January 1968 | SP5153806243; 51°45′09″N 1°15′17″W | | 1046736 | Brasenose College, South West Angle, Third Quadrangle | Q26298834 |
| Brasenose College, West Range, Third Quadrangle | II | Brasenose College | | | 28 June 1972 | SP5152406282; 51°45′10″N 1°15′18″W | | 1046734 | Brasenose College, West Range, Third Quadrangle More images | Q26298832 |
| Brasenose College, Principal's Lodging | II | Brasenose College | | | 12 January 1954 | SP5157506264; 51°45′10″N 1°15′15″W | | 1046737 | Brasenose College, Principal's Lodging More images | Q26298835 |
| Brasenose College, House at rear of Number 19 High Street | II | Brasenose College | | | 28 June 1972 | SP5150706241; 51°45′09″N 1°15′19″W | | 1198537 | Brasenose College, House at rear of Number 19 High Street | Q26494565 |
| Brasenose College Staircase 16, 17 and 18 | II* | High Street, Brasenose College | | | 30 March 1998 | SP5151106259; 51°45′10″N 1°15′19″W | | 1369494 | Brasenose College Staircase 16, 17 and 18 | Q17548818 |

=== Christ Church ===
| Name | Grade | Location | Type | Completed | Date designated | Grid ref. Geo-coordinates | Notes | Entry number | Image | Wikidata |
|---|---|---|---|---|---|---|---|---|---|---|
| Christ Church, The Great Quadrangle (Or Tom Quadrangle) | I | Christ Church | | | 12 January 1954 | SP5141605984; 51°45′01″N 1°15′24″W | | 1198760 | Christ Church, The Great Quadrangle (Or Tom Quadrangle) More images | Q7817298 |
| Christ Church, Mercury Fountain, The Great Quadrangle | I | Christ Church | | | 12 January 1954 | SP5146505989; 51°45′01″N 1°15′21″W | | 1046740 | Christ Church, Mercury Fountain, The Great Quadrangle More images | Q17528481 |
| Cathedral Church | I | Christ Church | | | 12 January 1954 | SP5154705977; 51°45′00″N 1°15′17″W | | 1283787 | Cathedral Church More images | Q1736208 |
| The Chapter House and Dorter Range to South of Cathedral | I | Christ Church | | | 12 January 1954 | SP5154005919; 51°44′59″N 1°15′17″W | | 1046739 | The Chapter House and Dorter Range to South of Cathedral More images | Q17528476 |
| Christ Church, Peckwater Quadrangle | I | Christ Church | | | 12 January 1954 | SP5151806136; 51°45′06″N 1°15′18″W | | 1198828 | Christ Church, Peckwater Quadrangle More images | Q7158768 |
| Christ Church, Library | I | Library, Christ Church | | | 12 January 1954 | SP5153106074; 51°45′04″N 1°15′18″W | | 1046742 | Christ Church, Library More images | Q5108809 |
| Christ Church, Canterbury Quadrangle | I | Christ Church | | | 12 January 1954 | SP5157006063; 51°45′03″N 1°15′16″W | | 1369651 | Christ Church, Canterbury Quadrangle More images | Q17150761 |
| Blue Boar Quad At Christ Church | II* | Christchurch, St Aldate's | | | 10 October 2006 | SP5144606109; 51°45′05″N 1°15′22″W | | 1408741 | Blue Boar Quad At Christ Church More images | Q4928906 |
| Christ Church Picture Gallery | II* | | | | 24 April 1998 | SP5156506037; 51°45′02″N 1°15′16″W | | 1323703 | Upload Photo | Q3675590 |
| Christ Church, Anatomy School | II | Christ Church | | | 12 January 1954 | SP5148505904; 51°44′58″N 1°15′20″W | | 1369650 | Christ Church, Anatomy School More images | Q26650956 |
| Christ Church, Boundary Wall Fronting Blue Boar Street | II | Christ Church | | | 28 June 1972 | SP5145206115; 51°45′05″N 1°15′22″W | | 1369652 | Christ Church, Boundary Wall Fronting Blue Boar Street | Q26650957 |
| Christ Church, Boundary Wall Fronting St Aldates On The North Of The Entrance Front | II | Christ Church | | | 28 June 1972 | SP5139606058; 51°45′03″N 1°15′25″W | | 1283645 | Christ Church, Boundary Wall Fronting St Aldates On The North Of The Entrance Front | Q26572481 |
| Christ Church, Boundary Wall Fronting St Aldates On The South Of The Entrance Front | II | Christ Church | | | 28 June 1972 | SP5141505918; 51°44′59″N 1°15′24″W | | 1046746 | Christ Church, Boundary Wall Fronting St Aldates On The South Of The Entrance Front | Q26298839 |
| Christ Church, Boundary wall on east fronting Merton Grove and surrounding the Scholars Garden | II | Christ Church | | | 28 June 1972 | SP5167005904; 51°44′58″N 1°15′11″W | | 1198959 | Upload Photo | Q26494463 |
| Christ Church, Boundary wall with Corpus Christi College to the south Of Canterbury Quadrangle | II | Christ Church | | | 28 June 1972 | SP5158406053; 51°45′03″N 1°15′15″W | | 1369613 | Upload Photo | Q26650933 |
| Christ Church, Gatepiers between the east end of the Library and the south range of Canterbury Quadrangle | II | Christ Church | | | 28 June 1972 | SP5155406069; 51°45′03″N 1°15′17″W | | 1198894 | Upload Photo | Q26494856 |
| Christ Church, Kitchen | II | Christ Church | | | 12 January 1954 | SP5150405915; 51°44′58″N 1°15′19″W | | 1046741 | Upload Photo | Q26298836 |
| Christ Church, Meadow Buildings | II | Christ Church | | | 29 January 1968 | SP5154905901; 51°44′58″N 1°15′17″W | | 1198863 | Christ Church, Meadow Buildings More images | Q7750780 |
| Christ Church, Outbuilding north of the North Range of Great Quadrangle | II | Christ Church | | | 28 June 1972 | SP5143606082; 51°45′04″N 1°15′23″W | | 1046743 | Upload Photo | Q26298837 |
| Christ Church, Outbuilding south of the South Range of Great Quadrangle | II | Christ Church | | | 28 June 1972 | SP5145205918; 51°44′59″N 1°15′22″W | | 1198864 | Christ Church, Outbuilding south of the South Range of Great Quadrangle More images | Q26494822 |
| Christ Church, Screen of War Memorial Garden fronting St Aldates | II | Christ Church | | | 28 June 1972 | SP5142205859; 51°44′57″N 1°15′24″W | | 1046747 | Christ Church, Screen of War Memorial Garden fronting St Aldates More images | Q26298841 |
| Christ Church, Footbridge and flanking walls in the Memorial Garden | II | Christ Church | | | 28 June 1972 | SP5147705864; 51°44′57″N 1°15′21″W | | 1046748 | Christ Church, Footbridge and flanking walls in the Memorial Garden | Q26298842 |
| Christ Church, Scullery | II | Christ Church | | | 12 January 1954 | SP5150405905; 51°44′58″N 1°15′19″W | | 1198814 | Christ Church, Scullery More images | Q26494773 |
| Christ Church, Wall And Screen Facing Oriel Square In The North East Corner Of The College | II* | Christ Church | | | 28 June 1972 | SP5157206130; 51°45′05″N 1°15′16″W | | 1046744 | Christ Church, Wall And Screen Facing Oriel Square In The North East Corner Of The College | Q99671022 |
| Christ Church, Wall Behind The Chapter House And To The South Of It | II | Christ Church | | | 28 June 1972 | SP5157505918; 51°44′59″N 1°15′16″W | | 1046745 | Upload Photo | Q26298838 |
| Christ Church, Wall On The North Side Of The Lane Leading From St Aldates To The Meadows | II | Christ Church | | | 28 June 1972 | SP5143405907; 51°44′58″N 1°15′23″W | | 1198914 | Christ Church, Wall On The North Side Of The Lane Leading From St Aldates To The Meadows | Q26494877 |
| Christ Church, Walls Between Tom And Peckwater Quadrangles | II | Christ Church | | | 28 June 1972 | SP5149506061; 51°45′03″N 1°15′20″W | | 1198945 | Upload Photo | Q26494452 |
| Christ Church, Walls Surrounding Senior Combination Room Garden | II | Christ Church | | | 28 June 1972 | SP5147805921; 51°44′59″N 1°15′21″W | | 1369614 | Upload Photo | Q26650934 |
| The Cottage | II | Christ Church Meadows, Botanic Gardens | | | 28 June 1972 | SP5197106046; 51°45′03″N 1°14′55″W | | 1115526 | Upload Photo | Q26409244 |

=== Corpus Christi College ===
| Name | Grade | Location | Type | Completed | Date designated | Grid ref. Geo-coordinates | Notes | Entry number | Image | Wikidata |
|---|---|---|---|---|---|---|---|---|---|---|
| Corpus Christi College, Front Quadrangle, North and West Range, and East Range excluding the Hall | I | Corpus Christi College | | | 12 January 1954 | SP5160906080; 51°45′04″N 1°15′14″W | | 1369615 | Corpus Christi College, Front Quadrangle, North and West Range, and East Range excluding the Hall | Q17528774 |
| Corpus Christi College, Hall | I | Corpus Christi College | | | 12 January 1954 | SP5163006075; 51°45′04″N 1°15′13″W | | 1046749 | Corpus Christi College, Hall | Q17528490 |
| Corpus Christi College, Kitchen to south east of Hall | II | Corpus Christi College | | | 12 January 1954 | SP5164306064; 51°45′03″N 1°15′12″W | | 1046711 | Corpus Christi College, Kitchen to south east of Hall | Q26298821 |
| Corpus Christi College, Chapel | I | Corpus Christi College | | | 12 January 1954 | SP5163806042; 51°45′03″N 1°15′12″W | | 1198987 | Corpus Christi College, Chapel | Q17528633 |
| Corpus Christi College, Library | I | Corpus Christi College | | | 12 January 1954 | SP5161406041; 51°45′02″N 1°15′13″W | | 1199005 | Corpus Christi College, Library More images | Q17528637 |
| Corpus Christi College, Sundial | I | Corpus Christi College | | | 12 January 1954 | SP5161306061; 51°45′03″N 1°15′13″W | | 1046710 | Corpus Christi College, Sundial | Q121624047 |
| Corpus Christi College, Cloister, Cloister Quadrangle | I | Corpus Christi College | | | 12 January 1954 | SP5164006037; 51°45′02″N 1°15′12″W | | 1046712 | Corpus Christi College, Cloister, Cloister Quadrangle | Q17528430 |
| Corpus Christi College, Fellows' Building | I | Corpus Christi College | | | 12 January 1954 | SP5164006023; 51°45′02″N 1°15′12″W | | 1046713 | Corpus Christi College, Fellows' Building | Q17528434 |
| Corpus Christi College, Gentlemen Commoners Buildings | I | Corpus Christi College | | | 12 January 1954 | SP5165406058; 51°45′03″N 1°15′11″W | | 1046714 | Corpus Christi College, Gentlemen Commoners Buildings | Q17528438 |
| Corpus Christi College, Emily Thomas Building | II | Corpus Christi College | | | 12 April 2000 | SP5165406081; 51°45′04″N 1°15′11″W | | 1380216 | Corpus Christi College, Emily Thomas Building | Q26660429 |
| Corpus Christi College, Screen between the Hall and the Emily Thomas Building | II | Corpus Christi College | | | 28 June 1972 | SP5164006086; 51°45′04″N 1°15′12″W | | 1046716 | Upload Photo | Q26298823 |
| Corpus Christi College, Boundary wall fronting Merton Grove on east of garden | II | Corpus Christi College | | | 28 June 1972 | SP5166006009; 51°45′01″N 1°15′11″W | | 1046718 | Corpus Christi College, Boundary wall fronting Merton Grove on east of garden | Q26298826 |
| Corpus Christi College, New Block | II | Corpus Christi College | | | 28 June 1972 | SP5167506112; 51°45′05″N 1°15′10″W | | 1046717 | Corpus Christi College, New Block More images | Q26298824 |
| Corpus Christi College, Old Lodgings (former President's Lodging) | II | Corpus Christi College | | | 12 January 1954 | SP5159406016; 51°45′02″N 1°15′14″W | | 1369638 | Corpus Christi College, Old Lodgings (former President's Lodging) | Q26650953 |
| Corpus Christi College, Senior Common Room east of Cloister | II | Corpus Christi College | | | 28 June 1972 | SP5165506043; 51°45′03″N 1°15′11″W | | 1046715 | Upload Photo | Q26298822 |

=== Exeter College ===
| Name | Grade | Location | Type | Completed | Date designated | Grid ref. Geo-coordinates | Notes | Entry number | Image | Wikidata |
|---|---|---|---|---|---|---|---|---|---|---|
| Exeter College, East Range, Main Quadrangle | I | Exeter College | | | 12 January 1954 | SP5147606387; 51°45′14″N 1°15′20″W | | 1046720 | Exeter College, East Range, Main Quadrangle | Q17528445 |
| Exeter College, North East Range, Main Quadrangle | I | Exeter College | | | 12 January 1954 | SP5147206404; 51°45′14″N 1°15′21″W | | 1046719 | Exeter College, North East Range, Main Quadrangle | Q17528441 |
| Exeter College, Chapel on North side of Quadrangle, Main Quadrangle | II* | Exeter College | | | 12 January 1954 | SP5144406400; 51°45′14″N 1°15′22″W | | 1046721 | Exeter College, Chapel on North side of Quadrangle, Main Quadrangle More images | Q17548482 |
| Exeter College, South East Range, Main Quadrangle | I | Exeter College | | | 12 January 1954 | SP5148406363; 51°45′13″N 1°15′20″W | | 1199135 | Exeter College, South East Range, Main Quadrangle | Q17528640 |
| Exeter College, South Range, Main Quadrangle | I | Exeter College | | | 12 January 1954 | SP5146106352; 51°45′13″N 1°15′21″W | | 1369639 | Exeter College, South Range, Main Quadrangle | Q17528781 |
| Exeter College, West Range, Main Quadrangle | I | Exeter College | | | 12 January 1954 | SP5143606371; 51°45′13″N 1°15′23″W | | 1199140 | Exeter College, West Range, Main Quadrangle More images | Q81173 |
| Exeter College, Boundary wall fronting Brasenose Lane and Radcliffe Square | II | Exeter College | | | 28 June 1972 | SP5150306357; 51°45′13″N 1°15′19″W | | 1199204 | Exeter College, Boundary wall fronting Brasenose Lane and Radcliffe Square | Q26495104 |
| Exeter College, Broad Street Buildings | II | Exeter College | | | 29 January 1968 | SP5145906437; 51°45′15″N 1°15′21″W | | 1369640 | Exeter College, Broad Street Buildings | Q26650954 |
| Exeter College, Library, Fellows' Garden | II | Exeter College | | | 29 January 1968 | SP5149606386; 51°45′14″N 1°15′19″W | | 1046722 | Exeter College, Library, Fellows' Garden | Q26298827 |
| Exeter College, Rector's House to north and north east of Palmers Tower | II | Exeter College | | | 28 June 1972 | SP5147606419; 51°45′15″N 1°15′20″W | | 1283508 | Exeter College, Rector's House to north and north east of Palmers Tower More images | Q26572353 |

=== Hertford College ===
| Name | Grade | Location | Type | Completed | Date designated | Grid ref. Geo-coordinates | Notes | Entry number | Image | Wikidata |
|---|---|---|---|---|---|---|---|---|---|---|
| Hertford College, Bridge over New College Lane | II | Hertford College | | | 29 January 1968 | SP5160906462; 51°45′16″N 1°15′13″W | | 1046725 | Hertford College, Bridge over New College Lane More images | Q3407626 |
| Hertford College, Chapel Of St Mary At Smiths Gate | II | Hertford College | | | 12 January 1954 | SP5158306487; 51°45′17″N 1°15′15″W | | 1369642 | Hertford College, Chapel Of St Mary At Smiths Gate More images | Q26650955 |
| Hertford College, Chapel, South Range | II | Hertford College | | | 29 January 1968 | SP5164706404; 51°45′14″N 1°15′12″W | | 1199229 | Hertford College, Chapel, South Range More images | Q26495128 |
| Hertford College, East Range | II* | Hertford College | | | 12 January 1954 | SP5164706433; 51°45′15″N 1°15′11″W | | 1369641 | Hertford College, East Range | Q17548833 |
| Hertford College, Library, South Range | II | Hertford College | | | 12 January 1954 | SP5163106400; 51°45′14″N 1°15′12″W | | 1046723 | Upload Photo | Q26298828 |
| Hertford College, North Extension On The North Side Of New College Lane | II | Hertford College | | | 28 June 1972 | SP5161506494; 51°45′17″N 1°15′13″W | | 1199235 | Hertford College, North Extension On The North Side Of New College Lane More images | Q26495133 |
| Hertford College, North Range | II | Hertford College | | | 12 January 1954 | SP5162306449; 51°45′16″N 1°15′13″W | | 1199209 | Hertford College, North Range | Q26495109 |
| Hertford College, Railings | II | Hertford College | | | 28 June 1972 | SP5160406428; 51°45′15″N 1°15′14″W | | 1199286 | Hertford College, Railings | Q26495177 |
| Hertford College, West Range | II* | Hertford College | | | 12 January 1954 | SP5161206424; 51°45′15″N 1°15′13″W | | 1046724 | Hertford College, West Range | Q67146959 |

=== Lincoln College ===
| Name | Grade | Location | Type | Completed | Date designated | Grid ref. Geo-coordinates | Notes | Entry number | Image | Wikidata |
|---|---|---|---|---|---|---|---|---|---|---|
| Lincoln College Library | I | High Street, Lincoln College | | | 12 January 1954 | SP5148006232; 51°45′09″N 1°15′20″W | | 1047271 | Lincoln College Library More images | Q4729514 |
| Lincoln College, Buttery, Front Quadrangle | I | Lincoln College | | | 12 January 1954 | SP5147906336; 51°45′12″N 1°15′20″W | | 1046699 | Lincoln College, Buttery, Front Quadrangle | Q17528413 |
| Lincoln College, East Range And Chapel, Chapel Quadrangle | I | Lincoln College | | | 12 January 1954 | SP5148006283; 51°45′10″N 1°15′20″W | | 1046701 | Lincoln College, East Range And Chapel, Chapel Quadrangle More images | Q17528419 |
| Lincoln College, Grove Buildings | II | Lincoln College | | | 12 January 1954 | SP5150306335; 51°45′12″N 1°15′19″W | | 1369671 | Upload Photo | Q26650967 |
| Lincoln College, Hall, Front Quadrangle | I | Lincoln College | | | 12 January 1954 | SP5148306328; 51°45′12″N 1°15′20″W | | 1199578 | Lincoln College, Hall, Front Quadrangle | Q17528643 |
| Lincoln College, Kitchen North East Of Hall, Front Quadrangle | I | Lincoln College | | | 12 January 1954 | SP5149306344; 51°45′12″N 1°15′20″W | | 1369670 | Lincoln College, Kitchen North East Of Hall, Front Quadrangle | Q17528843 |
| Lincoln College, New Library At East End Of The Garden | II | Lincoln College | | | 12 January 1954 | SP5149706267; 51°45′10″N 1°15′19″W | | 1046702 | Upload Photo | Q26298817 |
| Lincoln College, New wing to south east of Old Rector's Lodging | II | Lincoln College | | | 12 January 1954 | SP5149606306; 51°45′11″N 1°15′19″W | | 1199622 | Upload Photo | Q26495488 |
| Lincoln College, North, East and West Ranges, Front Quadrangle | I | Lincoln College | | | 12 January 1954 | SP5146306337; 51°45′12″N 1°15′21″W | | 1369669 | Lincoln College, North, East and West Ranges, Front Quadrangle | Q17528839 |
| Lincoln College, Old Rector's Lodging south of the Hall, Front Quadrangle | I | Lincoln College | | | 12 January 1954 | SP5148506316; 51°45′11″N 1°15′20″W | | 1046700 | Upload Photo | Q17528415 |
| Lincoln College, South Range, Front Quadrangle | I | Lincoln College | | | 12 January 1954 | SP5147006309; 51°45′11″N 1°15′21″W | | 1199585 | Lincoln College, South Range, Front Quadrangle | Q17528649 |
| Lincoln College, Wall between the Recto's Lodging and the College | II | Lincoln College | | | 28 June 1972 | SP5146506268; 51°45′10″N 1°15′21″W | | 1199655 | Upload Photo | Q26495519 |
| Lincoln College, West Range, Chapel Quadrangle | I | Lincoln College | | | 12 January 1954 | SP5146206288; 51°45′11″N 1°15′21″W | | 1283283 | Lincoln College, West Range, Chapel Quadrangle More images | Q81153 |
| Rector's Lodging, Lincoln College | II | Lincoln College | | | 28 June 1972 | SP5147506258; 51°45′10″N 1°15′21″W | | 1046703 | Rector's Lodging, Lincoln College More images | Q26298818 |

=== Jesus College ===
| Name | Grade | Location | Type | Completed | Date designated | Grid ref. Geo-coordinates | Notes | Entry number | Image | Wikidata |
|---|---|---|---|---|---|---|---|---|---|---|
| Jesus College, Boundary wall fronting Ship Street to the east of the New Block and Turl Street north of the Chapel | II | Jesus College | | | 28 June 1972 | SP5141506390; 51°45′14″N 1°15′24″W | | 1046729 | Jesus College, Boundary wall fronting Ship Street to the east of the New Block and Turl Street north of the Chapel More images | Q26298830 |
| Jesus College, Chapel, North Range | I | Jesus College | | | 12 January 1954 | SP5141206365; 51°45′13″N 1°15′24″W | | 1283432 | Jesus College, Chapel, North Range More images | Q17528712 |
| Jesus College, East Range, First Quadrangle | I | Jesus College | | | 12 January 1954 | SP5142406353; 51°45′13″N 1°15′23″W | | 1283452 | Jesus College, East Range, First Quadrangle | Q17528717 |
| Jesus College, East Range, Inner Quadrangle | I | Jesus College | | | 12 January 1954 | SP5139106339; 51°45′12″N 1°15′25″W | | 1369645 | Jesus College, East Range, Inner Quadrangle | Q17528792 |
| Jesus College, New Block on the south side of Ship Street | II | Jesus College | | | 28 June 1972 | SP5134706364; 51°45′13″N 1°15′27″W | | 1199446 | Jesus College, New Block on the south side of Ship Street | Q26495332 |
| Jesus College, North Range of the Principals Lodging | II | Jesus College | | | 28 June 1972 | SP5137806370; 51°45′13″N 1°15′26″W | | 1199387 | Jesus College, North Range of the Principals Lodging | Q26495272 |
| Jesus College, North Range, Inner Quadrangle | I | Jesus College | | | 12 January 1954 | SP5136406355; 51°45′13″N 1°15′26″W | | 1369644 | Jesus College, North Range, Inner Quadrangle | Q17528788 |
| Jesus College, Principals Lodging, North Range | I | Jesus College | | | 12 January 1954 | SP5139006358; 51°45′13″N 1°15′25″W | | 1046727 | Jesus College, Principals Lodging, North Range | Q17528454 |
| Jesus College, South Range, First Quadrangle | I | Jesus College | | | 12 January 1954 | SP5141606334; 51°45′12″N 1°15′24″W | | 1369643 | Jesus College, South Range, First Quadrangle | Q17528784 |
| Jesus College, South Range, Inner Quadrangle | I | Jesus College | | | 12 January 1954 | SP5137806318; 51°45′12″N 1°15′26″W | | 1046728 | Jesus College, South Range, Inner Quadrangle | Q17528457 |
| Jesus College, West Range, First Quadrangle | I | Jesus College | | | 12 January 1954 | SP5139106339; 51°45′12″N 1°15′25″W | | 1046726 | Jesus College, West Range, First Quadrangle | Q17528451 |
| Jesus College, West Range, Inner Quadrangle | I | Jesus College | | | 12 January 1954 | SP5135406328; 51°45′12″N 1°15′27″W | | 1283394 | Jesus College, West Range, Inner Quadrangle | Q131282858 |

=== Magdalen College ===
| Name | Grade | Location | Type | Completed | Date designated | Grid ref. Geo-coordinates | Notes | Entry number | Image | Wikidata |
|---|---|---|---|---|---|---|---|---|---|---|
| Magdalen College, Boundary wall of The Grove | II* | Magdalen College | | | 12 January 1954 | SP5199606541; 51°45′19″N 1°14′53″W | | 1046708 | Magdalen College, Boundary wall of The Grove More images | Q17548470 |
| Magdalen College, Bridge to Addisons Walk | II | Magdalen College | | | 28 June 1972 | SP5218006225; 51°45′08″N 1°14′44″W | | 1283171 | Magdalen College, Bridge to Addisons Walk | Q26572051 |
| Magdalen College, Chapel, Great Quadrangle | I | Magdalen College | | | 12 January 1954 | SP5208206188; 51°45′07″N 1°14′49″W | | 1369672 | Magdalen College, Chapel, Great Quadrangle More images | Q17528847 |
| Magdalen College, Cloister, Great Quadrangle | I | Magdalen College | | | 12 January 1954 | SP5213806200; 51°45′07″N 1°14′46″W | | 1283245 | Magdalen College, Cloister, Great Quadrangle | Q17528708 |
| Magdalen College, Gateway west of range on High Street | II | Magdalen College | | | 29 January 1968 | SP5204106194; 51°45′07″N 1°14′51″W | | 1369635 | Magdalen College, Gateway west of range on High Street More images | Q26650950 |
| Magdalen College, Hall, Great Quadrangle | I | Magdalen College | | | 12 January 1954 | SP5211506172; 51°45′07″N 1°14′47″W | | 1046704 | Magdalen College, Hall, Great Quadrangle More images | Q17528424 |
| Magdalen College, Kitchen, Great Quadrangle | I | Magdalen College | | | 12 January 1954 | SP5213606165; 51°45′06″N 1°14′46″W | | 1199704 | Magdalen College, Kitchen, Great Quadrangle | Q17528659 |
| Magdalen College, Range on The High Street | I | Magdalen College | | | 12 January 1954 | SP5207806165; 51°45′06″N 1°14′49″W | | 1199656 | Magdalen College, Range on The High Street More images | Q17528653 |
| Magdalen College, Screen between the New School Room and the East Range of St Swithins Quadrangle | II | Magdalen College | | | 28 June 1972 | SP5199206232; 51°45′09″N 1°14′54″W | | 1046709 | Magdalen College, Screen between the New School Room and the East Range of St Swithins Quadrangle More images | Q26298820 |
| Magdalen College, St Swithins Quadrangle | II | Magdalen College | | | 12 January 1954 | SP5200106232; 51°45′09″N 1°14′53″W | | 1046707 | Magdalen College, St Swithins Quadrangle More images | Q26298819 |
| Magdalen College, The Founders Tower, Great Quadrangle | I | Magdalen College | | | 12 January 1954 | SP5208906216; 51°45′08″N 1°14′49″W | | 1046705 | Magdalen College, The Founders Tower, Great Quadrangle More images | Q5474611 |
| Magdalen College, The Muniment Tower, Great Quadrangle | I | Magdalen College | | | 12 January 1954 | SP5208606209; 51°45′08″N 1°14′49″W | | 1369633 | Magdalen College, The Muniment Tower, Great Quadrangle | Q17528777 |
| Magdalen College, The New Buildings | I | Magdalen College | | | 12 January 1954 | SP5215106303; 51°45′11″N 1°14′45″W | | 1199727 | Magdalen College, The New Buildings More images | Q123054871 |
| Magdalen College, The New School Room | II* | Magdalen College | | | 12 January 1954 | SP5197806241; 51°45′09″N 1°14′54″W | | 1283219 | Magdalen College, The New School Room More images | Q17548759 |
| Magdalen College, The Old Grammar Hall | II* | Magdalen College | | | 12 January 1954 | SP5205806239; 51°45′09″N 1°14′50″W | | 1046706 | Magdalen College, The Old Grammar Hall More images | Q17548460 |
| Magdalen College, The President's Lodging | II | Magdalen College | | | 12 January 1954 | SP5207906238; 51°45′09″N 1°14′49″W | | 1199761 | Magdalen College, The President's Lodging | Q26495621 |
| Magdalen College, Wall between front wall on High Street and East Wing of St Swithins Quadrangle | II | Magdalen College | | | 28 June 1972 | SP5203606206; 51°45′08″N 1°14′51″W | | 1283187 | Magdalen College, Wall between front wall on High Street and East Wing of St Swithins Quadrangle | Q26572066 |
| Magdalen College, Wall fronting The High Street between Longwall Street and the College entrance | II | Magdalen College | | | 28 June 1972 | SP5198506223; 51°45′08″N 1°14′54″W | | 1369636 | Magdalen College, Wall fronting The High Street between Longwall Street and the College entrance | Q26650951 |
| Magdalen College, Wall stretching from the North Wing of the President's Lodging to the north east corner of St Swithins Quadrangle | II | Magdalen College | | | 28 June 1972 | SP5207706276; 51°45′10″N 1°14′49″W | | 1369637 | Upload Photo | Q26650952 |
| Magdalen College, Wests Buildings | II | Magdalen College | | | 12 January 1954 | SP5215106176; 51°45′07″N 1°14′45″W | | 1369634 | Magdalen College, Wests Buildings | Q26650949 |
| Staircases Nos 7 to 10, St Swithin's Quadrangle, Magdalen College | II | St Swithin's Quadrangle, Magdalen College | | | 28 June 1972 | SP5201306299; 51°45′11″N 1°14′52″W | | 1199772 | Upload Photo | Q26495629 |

=== Merton College ===
| Name | Grade | Location | Type | Completed | Date designated | Grid ref. Geo-coordinates | Notes | Entry number | Image | Wikidata |
|---|---|---|---|---|---|---|---|---|---|---|
| Merton College, Chapel, Front Quadrangle | I | Merton College | | | 12 January 1954 | SP5169506083; 51°45′04″N 1°15′09″W | | 1199994 | Merton College, Chapel, Front Quadrangle More images | Q17528667 |
| Merton College, East Garden Wall of The Warden's House | II | Merton Street, Merton College | | | 28 June 1972 | SP5178006166; 51°45′06″N 1°15′05″W | | 1300776 | Merton College, East Garden Wall of The Warden's House | Q26588056 |
| Merton College, East Range, Front Quadrangle | II | Merton College | | | 12 January 1954 | SP5176006107; 51°45′05″N 1°15′06″W | | 1369661 | Merton College, East Range, Front Quadrangle | Q26650963 |
| Merton College, East Range, Mob Quadrangle | I | Merton College | | | 12 January 1954 | SP5171806062; 51°45′03″N 1°15′08″W | | 1200028 | Merton College, East Range, Mob Quadrangle | Q17528673 |
| Merton College, Fellows' Quadrangle | I | Merton College | | | 12 January 1954 | SP5175506039; 51°45′02″N 1°15′06″W | | 1200042 | Merton College, Fellows' Quadrangle More images | Q17528676 |
| Merton College, Garden House (in north east of garden) | II | Merton College | | | 28 June 1972 | SP5189706133; 51°45′05″N 1°14′59″W | | 1200098 | Merton College, Garden House (in north east of garden) | Q26495931 |
| Merton College, Merton Grove | II | Merton College | | | 28 June 1972 | SP5168606020; 51°45′02″N 1°15′10″W | | 1046684 | Merton College, Merton Grove More images | Q26298807 |
| Merton College, North Range, Front Quadrangle | I | Merton College | | | 12 January 1954 | SP5173506111; 51°45′05″N 1°15′07″W | | 1046679 | Merton College, North Range, Front Quadrangle | Q17528389 |
| Merton College, North Range, Mob Quadrangle | I | Merton College | | | 12 January 1954 | SP5170006070; 51°45′03″N 1°15′09″W | | 1046682 | Merton College, North Range, Mob Quadrangle | Q17528398 |
| Merton College, Sacristy (to south east of Chapel) | I | Merton College | | | 12 January 1954 | SP5171506078; 51°45′04″N 1°15′08″W | | 1046681 | Merton College, Sacristy (to south east of Chapel) | Q17528395 |
| Merton College, Screen on Merton Street, being the Gateway to Merton Grove | II | Merton College | | | 28 June 1972 | SP5166006093; 51°45′04″N 1°15′11″W | | 1369663 | Merton College, Screen on Merton Street, being the Gateway to Merton Grove | Q26650964 |
| Merton College, Screen On South Side Of St Albans Quadrangle | II | Merton College | | | 28 June 1972 | SP5178006093; 51°45′04″N 1°15′05″W | | 1200067 | Merton College, Screen On South Side Of St Albans Quadrangle | Q26495902 |
| Merton College, Screen Wall of The Warden's House | II | Merton Street, Merton College | | | 28 June 1972 | SP5177906134; 51°45′05″N 1°15′05″W | | 1369664 | Merton College, Screen Wall of The Warden's House | Q26650965 |
| Merton College, South And West Ranges, Mob Quadrangle | I | Merton College | | | 12 January 1954 | SP5170306042; 51°45′03″N 1°15′09″W | | 1369662 | Merton College, South And West Ranges, Mob Quadrangle | Q17528823 |
| Merton College, South Range Fitzjames Gateway, Front Quadrangle | I | Merton College | | | 12 January 1954 | SP5176006087; 51°45′04″N 1°15′06″W | | 1046680 | Merton College, South Range Fitzjames Gateway, Front Quadrangle | Q122888617 |
| Merton College, South Range Hall, Front Quadrangle | II* | Merton College | | | 12 January 1954 | SP5173906078; 51°45′04″N 1°15′07″W | | 1369660 | Merton College, South Range Hall, Front Quadrangle | Q17548840 |
| Merton College, St Albans Quadrangle | II | Merton College | | | 28 June 1972 | SP5179106120; 51°45′05″N 1°15′04″W | | 1046683 | Merton College, St Albans Quadrangle | Q26298806 |
| Merton College, The Warden's House | II | 7 and 8, Merton Street, Merton College | | | 28 June 1972 | SP5177006147; 51°45′06″N 1°15′05″W | | 1200413 | Merton College, The Warden's House More images | Q26496217 |
| Merton College, Wall fronting Merton Street | II | Merton College | | | 28 June 1972 | SP5184306134; 51°45′05″N 1°15′01″W | | 1046685 | Merton College, Wall fronting Merton Street More images | Q26298808 |

=== New College ===
| Name | Grade | Location | Type | Completed | Date designated | Grid ref. Geo-coordinates | Notes | Entry number | Image | Wikidata |
|---|---|---|---|---|---|---|---|---|---|---|
| Bastion 11 | I | New College, City Wall | | | 12 January 1954 | SP5176406465; 51°45′16″N 1°15′05″W | | 1369705 | Bastion 11 | Q17528883 |
| Bastion 12 in New College | I | New College, City Walls | | | 12 January 1954 | SP5181906452; 51°45′16″N 1°15′03″W | | 1046611 | Bastion 12 in New College | Q17528302 |
| Bastion 13 | I | New College, City Wall | | | 12 January 1954 | SP5187806449; 51°45′16″N 1°14′59″W | | 1046612 | Bastion 13 | Q17528306 |
| Bastion 14, On North East Angle Of Wall | I | New College, City Wall | | | 12 January 1954 | SP5193806440; 51°45′15″N 1°14′56″W | | 1184494 | Bastion 14, On North East Angle Of Wall | Q17528620 |
| Bastion 15 | I | New College, City Wall | | | 12 January 1954 | SP5193806374; 51°45′13″N 1°14′56″W | | 1184504 | Bastion 15 | Q17528624 |
| New College Oxford, Cloister (To West Of Chapel) | I | New College | | | 12 January 1954 | SP5168106439; 51°45′15″N 1°15′10″W | | 1046687 | New College Oxford, Cloister (To West Of Chapel) | Q17528401 |
| New College Rooms (hall next East of Number 5) | II | New College Lane, New College | | | 28 June 1972 | SP5162706470; 51°45′16″N 1°15′13″W | | 1323171 | New College Rooms (hall next East of Number 5) | Q26608922 |
| New College, Bell Tower | I | New College | | | 12 January 1954 | SP5170006474; 51°45′16″N 1°15′09″W | | 1200452 | New College, Bell Tower | Q17528688 |
| New College, Boundary Wall Fronting New College Lane And Queens Lane | II | New College | | | 28 June 1972 | SP5171906393; 51°45′14″N 1°15′08″W | | 1300694 | New College, Boundary Wall Fronting New College Lane And Queens Lane | Q26587980 |
| New College, East Range, Great Quadrangle | I | New College | | | 12 January 1954 | SP5177606417; 51°45′15″N 1°15′05″W | | 1369665 | New College, East Range, Great Quadrangle | Q17528827 |
| New College, Iron Screen | II* | New College | | | 12 January 1954 | SP5183306407; 51°45′14″N 1°15′02″W | | 1046689 | New College, Iron Screen | Q17548456 |
| New College, New Buildings | II | New College | | | 28 June 1972 | SP5177006503; 51°45′17″N 1°15′05″W | | 1300697 | New College, New Buildings More images | Q26587983 |
| New College, North Range, Garden Quadrangle | I | New College | | | 12 January 1954 | SP5180906427; 51°45′15″N 1°15′03″W | | 1046688 | New College, North Range, Garden Quadrangle | Q17528409 |
| New College, North Range Hall, Kitchen And Chapel, Great Quadrangle | I | New College | | | 12 January 1954 | SP5176306444; 51°45′15″N 1°15′05″W | | 1200433 | New College, North Range Hall, Kitchen And Chapel, Great Quadrangle | Q17528684 |
| New College, South Range, Garden Quadrangle | I | New College | | | 12 January 1954 | SP5180406400; 51°45′14″N 1°15′03″W | | 1300731 | New College, South Range, Garden Quadrangle | Q17528748 |
| New College, South Range, Great Quadrangle | I | New College | | | 12 January 1954 | SP5174106400; 51°45′14″N 1°15′07″W | | 1200417 | New College, South Range, Great Quadrangle | Q17528680 |
| New College, The Longhouse | I | New College | | | 12 January 1954 | SP5179806388; 51°45′14″N 1°15′04″W | | 1369667 | New College, The Longhouse | Q17528835 |
| New College, The Warden's Barn | I | New College | | | 12 January 1954 | SP5167306426; 51°45′15″N 1°15′10″W | | 1369666 | New College, The Warden's Barn | Q17528831 |
| New College, Tutors House (To The East Of The Pandy) | II | New College | | | 28 June 1972 | SP5186606482; 51°45′17″N 1°15′00″W | | 1046690 | New College, Tutors House (To The East Of The Pandy) More images | Q26298809 |
| New College, West Range, Great Quadrangle | I | New College | | | 12 January 1954 | SP5170806420; 51°45′15″N 1°15′08″W | | 1046686 | New College, West Range, Great Quadrangle | Q121819169 |

=== Oriel College ===
| Name | Grade | Location | Type | Completed | Date designated | Grid ref. Geo-coordinates | Notes | Entry number | Image | Wikidata |
|---|---|---|---|---|---|---|---|---|---|---|
| Oriel College, Addition On South Of Carter Building | II | Back Quadrangle, Oriel College | | | 12 January 1954 | SP5160106142; 51°45′06″N 1°15′14″W | | 1046658 | Upload Photo | Q26298794 |
| Oriel College, Additions On East And South Of The East Range | II | Back Quadrangle, Oriel College | | | 12 January 1954 | SP5164006150; 51°45′06″N 1°15′12″W | | 1046657 | Upload Photo | Q26298793 |
| Oriel College, Boundary Wall | II | Oriel Street, Oriel College | | | 28 June 1972 | SP5160106172; 51°45′07″N 1°15′14″W | | 1046659 | Upload Photo | Q26298795 |
| Oriel College, East Range | I | Back Quadrangle, Oriel College | | | 12 January 1954 | SP5163606155; 51°45′06″N 1°15′12″W | | 1369688 | Oriel College, East Range | Q17528867 |
| Oriel College, East Range | I | St Marys Quadrangle, Oriel College | | | 12 January 1954 | SP5163306211; 51°45′08″N 1°15′12″W | | 1369692 | Oriel College, East Range | Q17528875 |
| Oriel College, East Range Oriel College, North Range | I | Front Quadrangle, Oriel College | | | 12 January 1954 | SP5163006134; 51°45′06″N 1°15′13″W | | 1046656 | Oriel College, East Range Oriel College, North Range | Q17528369 |
| Oriel College, North Range | I | Back Quadrangle, Oriel College | | | 12 January 1954 | SP5161906181; 51°45′07″N 1°15′13″W | | 1369690 | Oriel College, North Range | Q17528870 |
| Oriel College, Pump And Cistern In Back Quadrangle | II | Oriel College | | | 28 June 1972 | SP5162406139; 51°45′06″N 1°15′13″W | | 1046660 | Upload Photo | Q26298796 |
| Oriel College, South Range | I | Front Quadrangle, Oriel College | | | 12 January 1954 | SP5161806097; 51°45′04″N 1°15′13″W | | 1046655 | Oriel College, South Range | Q17528366 |
| Oriel College, South Range | I | St Marys Quadrangle, Oriel College | | | 12 January 1954 | SP5162306194; 51°45′07″N 1°15′13″W | | 1300647 | Oriel College, South Range | Q17528742 |
| Oriel College, Wall Fronting Magpie Lane | II | Oriel College | | | 28 June 1972 | SP5165806127; 51°45′05″N 1°15′11″W | | 1369691 | Oriel College, Wall Fronting Magpie Lane | Q26650979 |
| Oriel College, West Range | I | St Marys Quadrangle, Oriel College | | | 12 January 1954 | SP5160206203; 51°45′08″N 1°15′14″W | | 1046661 | Oriel College, West Range | Q17528373 |
| Oriel College, West Range | I | Front Quadrangle, Oriel College | | | 12 January 1954 | SP5160006115; 51°45′05″N 1°15′14″W | | 1200587 | Oriel College, West Range More images | Q17528692 |
| Oriel College, West Range | I | Back Quadrangle, Oriel College | | | 12 January 1954 | SP5160206154; 51°45′06″N 1°15′14″W | | 1369689 | Oriel College, West Range | Q67146990 |
| The Rhodes Building (North Range), Oriel College | II* | St Marys Quadrangle, Oriel College | | | 28 June 1972 | SP5161406233; 51°45′09″N 1°15′13″W | | 1046662 | The Rhodes Building (North Range), Oriel College More images | Q17548442 |

=== St Edmund Hall ===
| Name | Grade | Location | Type | Completed | Date designated | Grid ref. Geo-coordinates | Notes | Entry number | Image | Wikidata |
|---|---|---|---|---|---|---|---|---|---|---|
| St Edmund Hall, Boundary wall between Chapel and City Wall forming the boundary with New College | II | St Edmund Hall | | | 28 June 1972 | SP5190706306; 51°45′11″N 1°14′58″W | | 1369684 | St Edmund Hall, Boundary wall between Chapel and City Wall forming the boundary with New College | Q26650975 |
| St Edmund Hall, Churchyard walls round the Library | II | St Edmund Hall | | | 28 June 1972 | SP5188806360; 51°45′13″N 1°14′59″W | | 1046645 | St Edmund Hall, Churchyard walls round the Library | Q26298787 |
| St Edmund Hall, East Range including Chapel and Old Library | I | St Edmund Hall | | | 12 January 1954 | SP5189206308; 51°45′11″N 1°14′59″W | | 1183564 | St Edmund Hall, East Range including Chapel and Old Library | Q17528568 |
| St Edmund Hall, Library | I | St Edmund Hall | | | 12 January 1954 | SP5185706365; 51°45′13″N 1°15′01″W | | 1046644 | St Edmund Hall, Library More images | Q7595346 |
| St Edmund Hall, North Range | I | St Edmund Hall | | | 12 January 1954 | SP5186606319; 51°45′11″N 1°15′00″W | | 1046642 | St Edmund Hall, North Range | Q17528342 |
| St Edmund Hall, South Range | II | St Edmund Hall | | | 28 June 1972 | SP5186806295; 51°45′11″N 1°15′00″W | | 1300516 | St Edmund Hall, South Range | Q26587814 |
| St Edmund Hall, Well In Front Court | II | St Edmund Hall | | | 28 June 1972 | SP5186806308; 51°45′11″N 1°15′00″W | | 1046643 | St Edmund Hall, Well In Front Court | Q26298786 |
| St Edmund Hall, West Range | I | St Edmund Hall | | | 12 January 1954 | SP5184506303; 51°45′11″N 1°15′01″W | | 1369683 | St Edmund Hall, West Range | Q17528864 |

=== The Queen's College ===
| Name | Grade | Location | Type | Completed | Date designated | Grid ref. Geo-coordinates | Notes | Entry number | Image | Wikidata |
|---|---|---|---|---|---|---|---|---|---|---|
| The Queens College, Boundary Wall on Queens Lane adjoining the Chapel | II | The Queens College | | | 28 June 1972 | SP5183306333; 51°45′12″N 1°15′02″W | | 1369681 | Upload Photo | Q26650973 |
| The Queens College, Boundary Wall on Queens Lane to west Of Library | II | The Queens College | | | 28 June 1972 | SP5175006380; 51°45′13″N 1°15′06″W | | 1046640 | Upload Photo | Q26298784 |
| The Queens College, Brewhouse | II | The Queens College | | | 28 June 1972 | SP5172206357; 51°45′13″N 1°15′08″W | | 1369680 | Upload Photo | Q26650972 |
| The Queens College, Drawda Hall | II | The Queens College | | | 28 June 1972 | SP5173006306; 51°45′11″N 1°15′07″W | | 1046639 | The Queens College, Drawda Hall | Q26298783 |
| The Queens College, East Range | I | Front Quadrangle, The Queens College | | | 12 January 1954 | SP5182406298; 51°45′11″N 1°15′02″W | | 1046675 | The Queens College, East Range | Q17528387 |
| The Queens College, East Range | I | Back Quadrangle, The Queens College | | | 12 January 1954 | SP5182606358; 51°45′13″N 1°15′02″W | | 1183514 | The Queens College, East Range | Q17528564 |
| The Queens College, Fountain In Back Court | II | Back Quadrangle, The Queens College | | | 28 June 1972 | SP5180106358; 51°45′13″N 1°15′03″W | | 1046637 | The Queens College, Fountain In Back Court More images | Q26298781 |
| The Queens College, North Range | I | Back Quadrangle, The Queens College | | | 12 January 1954 | SP5180206376; 51°45′13″N 1°15′03″W | | 1369657 | The Queens College, North Range | Q17528819 |
| The Queens College, North Range (Including Hall And Chapel) | I | Front Quadrangle, The Queens College | | | 12 January 1954 | SP5180506329; 51°45′12″N 1°15′03″W | | 1046674 | The Queens College, North Range (Including Hall And Chapel) More images | Q17528383 |
| The Queens College, Provosts Lodgings | II | Queens Lane, The Queens College | | | 30 March 1993 | SP5171806376; 51°45′13″N 1°15′08″W | | 1047049 | The Queens College, Provosts Lodgings | Q26299163 |
| The Queens College, South Range | I | Front Quadrangle, The Queens College | | | 12 January 1954 | SP5179606279; 51°45′10″N 1°15′04″W | | 1183496 | The Queens College, South Range | Q17528544 |
| The Queens College, South Range | I | Back Quadrangle, The Queens College | | | 12 January 1954 | SP5179806341; 51°45′12″N 1°15′04″W | | 1369678 | The Queens College, South Range | Q17528860 |
| The Queens College, Terrace outside the Library | II | Back Quadrangle, The Queens College | | | 28 June 1972 | SP5178206359; 51°45′13″N 1°15′04″W | | 1369679 | Upload Photo | Q26650971 |
| The Queens College, Walls lning the lane leading From the Back Quadrangle to the Brewhouse | II | The Queens College | | | 28 June 1972 | SP5175206349; 51°45′12″N 1°15′06″W | | 1046638 | The Queens College, Walls lning the lane leading From the Back Quadrangle to the Brewhouse More images | Q26298782 |
| The Queens College, West Range | I | Front Quadrangle, The Queens College | | | 12 January 1954 | SP5177006310; 51°45′11″N 1°15′05″W | | 1046673 | The Queens College, West Range More images | Q17528379 |
| The Queens College, West Range | I | Back Quadrangle, The Queens College | | | 12 January 1954 | SP5177406359; 51°45′13″N 1°15′05″W | | 1046636 | The Queens College, West Range | Q17528338 |

=== University College ===
| Name | Grade | Location | Type | Completed | Date designated | Grid ref. Geo-coordinates | Notes | Entry number | Image | Wikidata |
|---|---|---|---|---|---|---|---|---|---|---|
| University College, Archway, forming the South West Entrance of the College onto Kybald Street | II | University College | | | 12 January 1954 | SP5170206170; 51°45′07″N 1°15′09″W | | 1184151 | University College, Archway, forming the South West Entrance of the College onto Kybald Street More images | Q26479467 |
| University College, Boundary wall on Logic Lane on either side of the Masters Lodging | II | University College | | | 28 June 1972 | SP5178706213; 51°45′08″N 1°15′04″W | | 1046598 | University College, Boundary wall on Logic Lane on either side of the Masters Lodging | Q26298760 |
| University College, Durham Buildings | II | Logic Lane, University College | | | 28 June 1972 | SP5180006248; 51°45′09″N 1°15′04″W | | 1299972 | University College, Durham Buildings | Q26587317 |
| University College, East Range | I | Main Quadrangle, University College | | | 12 January 1954 | SP5175206235; 51°45′09″N 1°15′06″W | | 1184113 | Upload Photo | Q17528588 |
| University College, Gatehouse University College, North Range | I | Main Quadrangle, University College | | | 12 January 1954 | SP5173206253; 51°45′09″N 1°15′07″W | | 1369675 | University College, Gatehouse University College, North Range More images | Q17528856 |
| University College, Masters Lodging | II | Logic Lane, University College | | | 12 January 1954 | SP5177906197; 51°45′07″N 1°15′05″W | | 1046597 | University College, Masters Lodging | Q26298759 |
| University College, New Range, on The High Street to the west Of the Main Quadrangle | II | Main Quadrangle, University College | | | 12 January 1954 | SP5169006248; 51°45′09″N 1°15′09″W | | 1046634 | University College, New Range, on The High Street to the west Of the Main Quadrangle More images | Q26298780 |
| University College, Radcliffe Quadrangle | I | Radcliffe Quadrangle, University College | | | 12 January 1954 | SP5177206252; 51°45′09″N 1°15′05″W | | 1046635 | University College, Radcliffe Quadrangle More images | Q7280036 |
| University College, Shelley Memorial | II | Main Quadrangle, University College | | | 12 January 1954 | SP5170406250; 51°45′09″N 1°15′09″W | | 1369676 | University College, Shelley Memorial | Q26650969 |
| University College, The Main Library | II | University College | | | 29 January 1968 | SP5170006193; 51°45′07″N 1°15′09″W | | 1046633 | University College, The Main Library | Q26298779 |
| University College, Wall on the South side of Radcliffe Quadrangle | II | University College | | | 28 June 1972 | SP5176906220; 51°45′08″N 1°15′05″W | | 1184171 | University College, Wall on the South side of Radcliffe Quadrangle | Q26479487 |
| University College, West Range | I | Main Quadrangle, University College | | | 12 January 1954 | SP5171406234; 51°45′09″N 1°15′08″W | | 1300275 | University College, West Range | Q17528736 |
| University College, South Range including Chapel, Hall and Kitchen | I | Main Quadrangle, University College | | | 12 January 1954 | SP5173206203; 51°45′08″N 1°15′07″W | | 1046632 | University College, South Range including Chapel, Hall and Kitchen | Q67146641 |

=== Outside colleges ===
| Name | Grade | Location | Type | Completed | Date designated | Grid ref. Geo-coordinates | Notes | Entry number | Image | Wikidata |
|---|---|---|---|---|---|---|---|---|---|---|
| Bear Inn Public House | II | Alfred Street | | | 12 January 1954 | SP5147406134; 51°45′06″N 1°15′21″W | | 1047357 | Bear Inn Public House More images | Q4876452 |
| 1, Bath Place | II | 1, Bath Place | | | 12 January 1954 | SP5165206508; 51°45′18″N 1°15′11″W | | 1299843 | 1, Bath Place More images | Q26587201 |
| 2 and 3, Bath Place | II | 2 and 3, Bath Place | | | 12 January 1954 | SP5166006505; 51°45′17″N 1°15′11″W | | 1369322 | 2 and 3, Bath Place More images | Q26650677 |
| 4, Bath Place | II | 4, Bath Place | | | 28 June 1972 | SP5165806493; 51°45′17″N 1°15′11″W | | 1185039 | Upload Photo | Q26480349 |
| 5, Bath Place | II | 5, Bath Place | | | 12 January 1954 | SP5165206490; 51°45′17″N 1°15′11″W | | 1047371 | 5, Bath Place | Q26299481 |
| 6 and 7, Bath Place | II | 6 and 7, Bath Place | | | 28 June 1972 | SP5167606490; 51°45′17″N 1°15′10″W | | 1369323 | Upload Photo | Q26650678 |
| Quartermains Stables (between 6 and 7) | II | Bear Lane | | | 28 June 1972 | SP5152106149; 51°45′06″N 1°15′18″W | | 1185084 | Quartermains Stables (between 6 and 7) More images | Q26480392 |
| 5, Bear Lane | II | 5, Bear Lane | | | 12 January 1954 | SP5153706151; 51°45′06″N 1°15′17″W | | 1047372 | 5, Bear Lane More images | Q26299482 |
| 6, Bear Lane | II | 6, Bear Lane | | | 28 June 1972 | SP5153106151; 51°45′06″N 1°15′18″W | | 1047373 | 6, Bear Lane More images | Q26299483 |
| 7, Bear Lane | II | 7, Bear Lane | | | 28 June 1972 | SP5151406147; 51°45′06″N 1°15′19″W | | 1369324 | 7, Bear Lane | Q26650679 |
| New Bodleian Library, now known as Weston Library | II | Broad Street | | | 1 September 2003 | SP5151306523; 51°45′18″N 1°15′18″W | | 1390596 | New Bodleian Library, now known as Weston Library More images | Q24083412 |
| Screen Wall and Piers at the Old Ashmolean Building (History of Science Museum) fronting Broad Street | I | Broad Street | | | 28 June 1972 | SP5148806450; 51°45′16″N 1°15′20″W | | 1299669 | Screen Wall and Piers at the Old Ashmolean Building (History of Science Museum) fronting Broad Street | Q17528721 |
| History of Science Museum (Old Ashmolean) | I | Broad Street | | | 12 January 1954 | SP5148906435; 51°45′15″N 1°15′20″W | | 1369352 | History of Science Museum (Old Ashmolean) More images | Q6941088 |
| The Clarendon Building | I | Broad Street | | | 12 January 1954 | SP5155106474; 51°45′17″N 1°15′16″W | | 1185456 | The Clarendon Building More images | Q115451 |
| The Sheldonian Theatre | I | Broad Street | | | 12 January 1954 | SP5152106443; 51°45′16″N 1°15′18″W | | 1047350 | The Sheldonian Theatre More images | Q83874 |
| Walling, railings at Sheldonian Theatre and ornamental piers fronting Broad Street | I | Broad Street | | | 28 June 1972 | SP5151606468; 51°45′16″N 1°15′18″W | | 1369353 | Walling, railings at Sheldonian Theatre and ornamental piers fronting Broad Street More images | Q96108466 |
| 6, Broad Street | II | 6, Broad Street | | | 28 June 1972 | SP5132006419; 51°45′15″N 1°15′29″W | | 1047342 | 6, Broad Street More images | Q26299448 |
| 7 and 8, Broad Street | II | 7 and 8, Broad Street | | | 28 June 1972 | SP5132906419; 51°45′15″N 1°15′28″W | | 1185307 | 7 and 8, Broad Street More images | Q26480622 |
| 11, Broad Street | II | 11, Broad Street | | | 28 June 1972 | SP5134206418; 51°45′15″N 1°15′27″W | | 1047343 | 11, Broad Street More images | Q26299450 |
| 12, Broad Street | II | 12, Broad Street | | | 28 June 1972 | SP5134706418; 51°45′15″N 1°15′27″W | | 1047344 | 12, Broad Street More images | Q26299451 |
| 13, Broad Street | II | 13, Broad Street | | | 28 June 1972 | SP5135206418; 51°45′15″N 1°15′27″W | | 1185319 | 13, Broad Street More images | Q26480637 |
| 14, Broad Street | II | 14, Broad Street | | | 28 June 1972 | SP5135906417; 51°45′15″N 1°15′27″W | | 1047345 | 14, Broad Street More images | Q26299452 |
| 15, Broad Street | II | 15, Broad Street | | | 28 June 1972 | SP5136306417; 51°45′15″N 1°15′26″W | | 1185348 | 15, Broad Street More images | Q26480663 |
| 16, Broad Street | II | 16, Broad Street | | | 12 January 1954 | SP5136806417; 51°45′15″N 1°15′26″W | | 1047346 | 16, Broad Street More images | Q26299453 |
| 17 and 18, Broad Street | II | 17 and 18, Broad Street | | | 28 June 1972 | SP5137406418; 51°45′15″N 1°15′26″W | | 1047347 | 17 and 18, Broad Street More images | Q26299454 |
| 19 and 20, Broad Street | II | 19 and 20, Broad Street | | | 12 January 1954 | SP5138106419; 51°45′15″N 1°15′25″W | | 1185358 | 19 and 20, Broad Street More images | Q26480675 |
| 21, Broad Street | II | 21, Broad Street | | | 28 June 1972 | SP5138606420; 51°45′15″N 1°15′25″W | | 1047348 | 21, Broad Street More images | Q26299455 |
| 22, Broad Street | II | 22, Broad Street | | | 28 June 1972 | SP5139006421; 51°45′15″N 1°15′25″W | | 1047349 | 22, Broad Street More images | Q26299456 |
| 23-25, Broad Street | II | 23-25, Broad Street | | | 28 June 1972 | SP5139806421; 51°45′15″N 1°15′24″W | | 1185366 | 23-25, Broad Street More images | Q26480682 |
| 48 and 49, Broad Street | II | 48 and 49, Broad Street | | | 12 January 1954 | SP5148606480; 51°45′17″N 1°15′20″W | | 1047351 | 48 and 49, Broad Street | Q26299457 |
| 50 and 51, Broad Street | II | 50 and 51, Broad Street | | | 12 January 1954 | SP5148106479; 51°45′17″N 1°15′20″W | | 1047352 | 50 and 51, Broad Street More images | Q26299458 |
| The White Horse Public House | II | 52, Broad Street | | | 12 January 1954 | SP5147406476; 51°45′17″N 1°15′20″W | | 1185470 | The White Horse Public House More images | Q26480787 |
| 53, Broad Street | II | 53, Broad Street | | | 12 January 1954 | SP5147006475; 51°45′17″N 1°15′21″W | | 1369354 | 53, Broad Street | Q26650703 |
| Bastion Number 4 | I | Catte Street, City Wall | | | 12 January 1954 | SP5132106397; 51°45′14″N 1°15′29″W | | 1184408 | Bastion Number 4 | Q17528604 |
| K6 Telephone Kiosk adjacent to Bodleian Library | II | Catte Street | | | 20 August 1987 | SP5158206447; 51°45′16″N 1°15′15″W | | 1047082 | K6 Telephone Kiosk adjacent to Bodleian Library More images | Q26299195 |
| The Indian Institute (now Oxford Martin School) | II | Catte Street | | | 28 June 1972 | SP5158006506; 51°45′18″N 1°15′15″W | | 1369355 | The Indian Institute (now Oxford Martin School) More images | Q3152319 |
| Stone On The East Corner Of Magdalen Tower, In The High Street | II | High Street, London To Worcester Turnpike | | | 28 June 1972 | SP5209806144; 51°45′06″N 1°14′48″W | | 1184726 | Stone On The East Corner Of Magdalen Tower, In The High Street More images | Q26480051 |
| Magdalen Bridge | II* | High Street | | | 12 January 1954 | SP5213106102; 51°45′04″N 1°14′46″W | | 1369360 | Magdalen Bridge More images | Q5573206 |
| Fountain in the Centre of the Garden | II | High Street, Botanic Gardens | | | 28 June 1972 | SP5203006076; 51°45′03″N 1°14′52″W | | 1047286 | Fountain in the Centre of the Garden | Q26299390 |
| The Daubeny Laboratory The Manley Laboratory The Vines Wing The West Block | II | High Street, Botanic Gardens | | | 12 January 1954 | SP5202706135; 51°45′05″N 1°14′52″W | | 1047285 | The Daubeny Laboratory The Manley Laboratory The Vines Wing The West Block More images | Q26299389 |
| The Garden Wall and the East and West Gateways | I | High Street, Botanic Gardens | | | 12 January 1954 | SP5197906104; 51°45′04″N 1°14′54″W | | 1369362 | The Garden Wall and the East and West Gateways | Q17528760 |
| The Library and Herbarium of the Botanic Gardens | I | High Street, Botanic Gardens | | | 12 January 1954 | SP5208506105; 51°45′04″N 1°14′49″W | | 1320377 | The Library and Herbarium of the Botanic Gardens More images | Q17528753 |
| The Main (or Danby) Gateway in the centre with its flanking wall and 2 doorways | I | High Street, Botanic Gardens | | | 12 January 1954 | SP5205606121; 51°45′05″N 1°14′50″W | | 1320345 | The Main (or Danby) Gateway in the centre with its flanking wall and 2 doorways More images | Q17528749 |
| Wall between Main Gate and Magdalen College Bursary | I | High Street, Botanic Gardens | | | 28 June 1972 | SP5206706114; 51°45′05″N 1°14′50″W | | 1047284 | Wall between Main Gate and Magdalen College Bursary | Q17528527 |
| Wall to East of Magdalen College Bursary | I | High Street, Botanic Gardens | | | 28 June 1972 | SP5209906097; 51°45′04″N 1°14′48″W | | 1369361 | Wall to East of Magdalen College Bursary | Q17528758 |
| Vase at the South End of the Main Walk | II | High Street, Botanic Gardens | | | 28 June 1972 | SP5197005970; 51°45′00″N 1°14′55″W | | 1115516 | Vase at the South End of the Main Walk | Q26409236 |
| University Examination Schools | II | High Street | | | 12 January 1954 | SP5184006204; 51°45′08″N 1°15′02″W | | 1115427 | University Examination Schools More images | Q5419282 |
| Entrance Screen of the Examination Schools fronting Merton Street | II | High Street | | | 28 June 1972 | SP5189006193; 51°45′07″N 1°14′59″W | | 1047291 | Entrance Screen of the Examination Schools fronting Merton Street More images | Q26299394 |
| Wall and Doorway adjoining the Examination Schools and to the West of them | II | High Street | | | 28 June 1972 | SP5184306242; 51°45′09″N 1°15′01″W | | 1369366 | Wall and Doorway adjoining the Examination Schools and to the West of them | Q26650711 |
| University Registry Annexe | II | 74, High Street | | | 12 January 1954 | SP5189806228; 51°45′08″N 1°14′59″W | | 1369365 | University Registry Annexe | Q26650710 |
| Walls, Fences and Gates at the Church Of St Martin And All Saints (Lincoln College Library) | II | High Street | | | 28 June 1972 | SP5146606242; 51°45′09″N 1°15′21″W | | 1047272 | Walls, Fences and Gates at the Church Of St Martin And All Saints (Lincoln College Library) | Q26299376 |
| 4 and 5, High Street | II | 4 and 5, High Street | | | 12 January 1954 | SP5136206204; 51°45′08″N 1°15′26″W | | 1116352 | 4 and 5, High Street | Q26409976 |
| 6, High Street | II* | 6, High Street | | | 12 January 1954 | SP5137106206; 51°45′08″N 1°15′26″W | | 1047311 | 6, High Street | Q17548671 |
| 7, High Street | II | 7, High Street | | | 12 January 1954 | SP5137706207; 51°45′08″N 1°15′26″W | | 1116359 | 7, High Street | Q26409983 |
| 10, High Street | II | 10, High Street | | | 12 January 1954 | SP5139906209; 51°45′08″N 1°15′25″W | | 1047312 | 10, High Street | Q26299417 |
| 11, High Street | II | 11, High Street | | | 12 January 1954 | SP5140506210; 51°45′08″N 1°15′24″W | | 1116316 | 11, High Street | Q26409943 |
| The Covered Market | II | High Street | | | 9 March 2000 | SP5140406269; 51°45′10″N 1°15′24″W | | 1380159 | The Covered Market More images | Q5179234 |
| 12-15, High Street | II | 12-15, High Street | | | 12 January 1954 | SP5141906213; 51°45′08″N 1°15′23″W | | 1369376 | 12-15, High Street | Q26650720 |
| 16, High Street | II | 16, High Street | | | 12 January 1954 | SP5143306217; 51°45′08″N 1°15′23″W | | 1047270 | 16, High Street | Q26299375 |
| The Mitre Hotel | II* | 17, High Street | | | 12 January 1954 | SP5145006222; 51°45′08″N 1°15′22″W | | 1369357 | The Mitre Hotel More images | Q17548781 |
| 19 and 20, High Street | II | 19 and 20, High Street | | | 12 January 1954 | SP5150806233; 51°45′09″N 1°15′19″W | | 1369358 | 19 and 20, High Street | Q26650706 |
| 21, High Street | II | 21, High Street | | | 12 January 1954 | SP5151506237; 51°45′09″N 1°15′18″W | | 1047273 | 21, High Street | Q26299377 |
| 22, High Street | II | 22, High Street | | | 12 January 1954 | SP5152006238; 51°45′09″N 1°15′18″W | | 1369359 | 22, High Street | Q26650707 |
| 23, High Street | II | 23, High Street | | | 12 January 1954 | SP5152506239; 51°45′09″N 1°15′18″W | | 1047274 | 23, High Street | Q26299379 |
| K6 Telephone Kiosk, adjacent to 32 High Street | II | 32 High Street, OX1 4AN | | | 18 October 2019 | SP5172206279; 51°45′10″N 1°15′08″W | | 1465810 | K6 Telephone Kiosk, adjacent to 32 High Street | Q97384944 |
| 33, High Street | II | 33, High Street | | | 12 January 1954 | SP5173306287; 51°45′10″N 1°15′07″W | | 1047277 | 33, High Street | Q26299381 |
| 34, High Street | II | 34, High Street | | | 12 January 1954 | SP5174006284; 51°45′10″N 1°15′07″W | | 1047278 | 34, High Street | Q26299382 |
| 35 and 36, High Street | II | 35 and 36, High Street | | | 12 January 1954 | SP5174306290; 51°45′11″N 1°15′07″W | | 1047279 | 35 and 36, High Street | Q26299383 |
| 37 and 38, High Street | II | 37 and 38, High Street | | | 12 January 1954 | SP5175606285; 51°45′10″N 1°15′06″W | | 1116054 | 37 and 38, High Street | Q26409712 |
| 42 and 43, High Street | II | 42 and 43, High Street | | | 12 January 1954 | SP5185506268; 51°45′10″N 1°15′01″W | | 1047281 | 42 and 43, High Street | Q26299385 |
| 48, High Street | II | 48, High Street | | | 12 January 1954 | SP5188506260; 51°45′09″N 1°14′59″W | | 1115601 | 48, High Street | Q26409304 |
| 49-52, High Street | II | 49-52, High Street | | | 28 June 1972 | SP5190406255; 51°45′09″N 1°14′58″W | | 1047282 | 49-52, High Street | Q26299386 |
| 58, 58a and 59, High Street | II | 58, 58a and 59, High Street | | | 28 June 1972 | SP5194106245; 51°45′09″N 1°14′56″W | | 1047283 | 58, 58a and 59, High Street More images | Q26299387 |
| 62, High Street | II | 62, High Street | | | 12 January 1954 | SP5198806199; 51°45′07″N 1°14′54″W | | 1320418 | 62, High Street | Q26606414 |
| 63, High Street | II | 63, High Street | | | 12 January 1954 | SP5198206203; 51°45′08″N 1°14′54″W | | 1047288 | 63, High Street | Q26299391 |
| 64, High Street | II | 64, High Street | | | 12 January 1954 | SP5197506204; 51°45′08″N 1°14′55″W | | 1369364 | 64, High Street | Q26650709 |
| 65, High Street (Stanford House) | II | 65, High Street | | | 12 January 1954 | SP5196706207; 51°45′08″N 1°14′55″W | | 1115465 | 65, High Street (Stanford House) | Q26409192 |
| 66-68, High Street | II | 66-68, High Street | | | 12 January 1954 | SP5196006210; 51°45′08″N 1°14′55″W | | 1047289 | 66-68, High Street | Q26299392 |
| 69 and 70, High Street | II | 69 and 70, High Street | | | 12 January 1954 | SP5194406218; 51°45′08″N 1°14′56″W | | 1115468 | 69 and 70, High Street | Q26409195 |
| 71 and 72, High Street | II | 71 and 72, High Street | | | 12 January 1954 | SP5193106221; 51°45′08″N 1°14′57″W | | 1047290 | 71 and 72, High Street | Q26299393 |
| 83, High Street | II | 83, High Street | | | 12 January 1954 | SP5183606237; 51°45′09″N 1°15′02″W | | 1320571 | 83, High Street | Q26606555 |
| 84, High Street | II | 84, High Street | | | 12 January 1954 | SP5183106239; 51°45′09″N 1°15′02″W | | 1047292 | 84, High Street | Q26299395 |
| 85, High Street | II | 85, High Street | | | 12 January 1954 | SP5182306241; 51°45′09″N 1°15′02″W | | 1139039 | 85, High Street | Q26431993 |
| 86 and 87, High Street | II* | 86 and 87, High Street | | | 12 January 1954 | SP5181206244; 51°45′09″N 1°15′03″W | | 1047248 | 86 and 87, High Street | Q17548649 |
| 90, High Street | II | 90, High Street | | | 12 January 1954 | SP5167606250; 51°45′09″N 1°15′10″W | | 1369387 | 90, High Street More images | Q26650731 |
| 91, High Street | II | 91, High Street | | | 12 January 1954 | SP5166406246; 51°45′09″N 1°15′11″W | | 1047249 | 91, High Street More images | Q26299355 |
| 92 and 93, High Street | II | 92 and 93, High Street | | | 12 January 1954 | SP5165206241; 51°45′09″N 1°15′11″W | | 1047250 | 92 and 93, High Street More images | Q26299356 |
| Tudor House | II* | 94, High Street | | | 12 January 1954 | SP5164006239; 51°45′09″N 1°15′12″W | | 1369388 | Tudor House More images | Q17548787 |
| 104, High Street | II | 104, High Street | | | 12 January 1954 | SP5157906222; 51°45′08″N 1°15′15″W | | 1369389 | 104, High Street More images | Q26650732 |
| 105, High Street | II | 105, High Street | | | 12 January 1954 | SP5157406223; 51°45′08″N 1°15′15″W | | 1047252 | 105, High Street More images | Q26299358 |
| 106 and 107, High Street (former Tackley's Inn) | II* | 106 and 107, High Street | | | 12 January 1954 | SP5156806218; 51°45′08″N 1°15′16″W | | 1047253 | 106 and 107, High Street (former Tackley's Inn) More images | Q17548656 |
| 113 and 114, High Street | II | 113 and 114, High Street | | | 28 June 1972 | SP5152006207; 51°45′08″N 1°15′18″W | | 1047254 | 113 and 114, High Street | Q26299360 |
| 115, High Street | II | 115, High Street | | | 12 January 1954 | SP5150806205; 51°45′08″N 1°15′19″W | | 1047255 | 115, High Street | Q26299361 |
| 116 and 117, High Street | II | 116 and 117, High Street | | | 12 January 1954 | SP5150206204; 51°45′08″N 1°15′19″W | | 1047256 | 116 and 117, High Street | Q26299362 |
| 118, High Street | II* | 118, High Street | | | 12 January 1954 | SP5149206202; 51°45′08″N 1°15′20″W | | 1047257 | 118, High Street More images | Q17548662 |
| 119, High Street | II | 119, High Street | | | 12 January 1954 | SP5148706201; 51°45′08″N 1°15′20″W | | 1145854 | 119, High Street | Q26439002 |
| London & County Bank (former) | II | 120-122, High Street | | | 12 January 1954 | SP5147506198; 51°45′08″N 1°15′21″W | | 1047258 | London & County Bank (former) | Q26299363 |
| 123, High Street | II | 123, High Street | | | 12 January 1954 | SP5145806194; 51°45′08″N 1°15′21″W | | 1145862 | 123, High Street | Q26439013 |
| 124 and 125, High Street | II | 124 and 125, High Street | | | 12 January 1954 | SP5144806195; 51°45′08″N 1°15′22″W | | 1047259 | 124 and 125, High Street | Q26299364 |
| 126, High Street | I | 126, High Street | | | 12 January 1954 | SP5144006193; 51°45′07″N 1°15′22″W | | 1047260 | 126, High Street | Q17528524 |
| 130, High Street | II | 130, High Street | | | 12 January 1954 | SP5142006187; 51°45′07″N 1°15′23″W | | 1369390 | 130, High Street | Q26650733 |
| Kemp Hall | II* | 130a, High Street | | | 12 January 1954 | SP5142506168; 51°45′07″N 1°15′23″W | | 1145872 | Kemp Hall | Q17548731 |
| 131, High Street | II | 131, High Street | | | 12 January 1954 | SP5141306186; 51°45′07″N 1°15′24″W | | 1047261 | 131, High Street | Q26299365 |
| The Chequers Inn | II | 132, High Street | | | 12 January 1954 | SP5140706178; 51°45′07″N 1°15′24″W | | 1186736 | The Chequers Inn More images | Q26481975 |
| 134, High Street | II | 134, High Street | | | 28 June 1972 | SP5139906171; 51°45′07″N 1°15′25″W | | 1047262 | 134, High Street | Q26299366 |
| 135, High Street | II | 135, High Street | | | 12 January 1954 | SP5139306172; 51°45′07″N 1°15′25″W | | 1186742 | 135, High Street | Q26481982 |
| Cecil Rhodes Memorial Plaque | II | 6, King Edward Street, OX1 4JL | | | 21 July 2022 | SP5154106169; 51°45′07″N 1°15′17″W | | 1482860 | Cecil Rhodes Memorial Plaque More images | Q113334254 |
| Real Tennis Court | II | Kybald Street | | | 27 November 1963 | SP5173506154; 51°45′06″N 1°15′07″W | | 1105651 | Real Tennis Court | Q6820730 |
| 1, Kybald Street | II | 1, Kybald Street | | | 12 January 1954 | SP5168106145; 51°45′06″N 1°15′10″W | | 1104840 | Upload Photo | Q26398806 |
| 2, Kybald Street | II | 2, Kybald Street | | | 12 January 1954 | SP5170606162; 51°45′06″N 1°15′09″W | | 1369385 | 2, Kybald Street More images | Q26650729 |
| 3, Kybald Street | II | 3, Kybald Street, University College | | | 28 June 1972 | SP5169106179; 51°45′07″N 1°15′09″W | | 1369677 | 3, Kybald Street More images | Q26650970 |
| 4 and 5, Kybald Street | II | 4 and 5, Kybald Street | | | 12 January 1954 | SP5167406160; 51°45′06″N 1°15′10″W | | 1047246 | 4 and 5, Kybald Street More images | Q26299353 |
| 1-3, Longwall Street | II | 1-3, Longwall Street | | | 12 January 1954 | SP5195806286; 51°45′10″N 1°14′55″W | | 1047212 | 1-3, Longwall Street | Q26299317 |
| 4, Longwall Street | II | 4, Longwall Street | | | 12 January 1954 | SP5195906294; 51°45′11″N 1°14′55″W | | 1047213 | 4, Longwall Street | Q26299319 |
| 5 and 6, Longwall Street | II | 5 and 6, Longwall Street | | | 12 January 1954 | SP5195906299; 51°45′11″N 1°14′55″W | | 1047214 | 5 and 6, Longwall Street | Q26299320 |
| 7, Longwall Street | II | 7, Longwall Street | | | 12 January 1954 | SP5195706309; 51°45′11″N 1°14′55″W | | 1106303 | 7, Longwall Street | Q26400179 |
| 8, Longwall Street | II | 8, Longwall Street | | | 12 January 1954 | SP5195706318; 51°45′11″N 1°14′55″W | | 1047215 | 8, Longwall Street | Q26299321 |
| 9-12, Longwall Street | II | 9-12, Longwall Street | | | 12 January 1954 | SP5195706346; 51°45′12″N 1°14′55″W | | 1047216 | 9-12, Longwall Street | Q26299322 |
| 13, Longwall Street | II | 13, Longwall Street | | | 12 January 1954 | SP5195606357; 51°45′13″N 1°14′55″W | | 1325970 | 13, Longwall Street | Q26611482 |
| 14, Longwall Street | II | 14, Longwall Street | | | 12 January 1954 | SP5195706365; 51°45′13″N 1°14′55″W | | 1369410 | 14, Longwall Street | Q26650752 |
| 18, Longwall Street | II | 18, Longwall Street | | | 28 June 1972 | SP5195106448; 51°45′16″N 1°14′56″W | | 1047217 | 18, Longwall Street More images | Q26299323 |
| 19 and 20, Longwall Street | II | 19 and 20, Longwall Street | | | 28 June 1972 | SP5194906456; 51°45′16″N 1°14′56″W | | 1325542 | 19 and 20, Longwall Street More images | Q26611094 |
| Former Morris Garage | II | 21, Longwall Street | | | 23 May 2012 | SP5194206462; 51°45′16″N 1°14′56″W | | 1407549 | Former Morris Garage More images | Q26675939 |
| Stables to South of Number 5 | II | Magpie Lane | | | 12 January 1954 | SP5165006182; 51°45′07″N 1°15′11″W | | 1107868 | Stables to South of Number 5 More images | Q26401658 |
| 2, Magpie Lane | II | 2, Magpie Lane | | | 12 January 1954 | SP5164006222; 51°45′08″N 1°15′12″W | | 1369411 | 2, Magpie Lane More images | Q26650753 |
| 3, Magpie Lane | II | 3, Magpie Lane | | | 12 January 1954 | SP5164606214; 51°45′08″N 1°15′12″W | | 1107910 | 3, Magpie Lane More images | Q26401698 |
| 4, Magpie Lane | II | 4, Magpie Lane | | | 12 January 1954 | SP5164706208; 51°45′08″N 1°15′12″W | | 1047219 | 4, Magpie Lane More images | Q26299324 |
| 5, Magpie Lane | II | 5, Magpie Lane | | | 12 January 1954 | SP5164606199; 51°45′08″N 1°15′12″W | | 1369412 | 5, Magpie Lane More images | Q26650754 |
| 6-9, Magpie Lane | II | 6-9, Magpie Lane | | | 28 June 1972 | SP5165606162; 51°45′06″N 1°15′11″W | | 1047220 | 6-9, Magpie Lane More images | Q26299325 |
| K6 Telephone Kiosk | II | Market Street, OX1 3DU | | | 7 March 2017 | SP5137206294; 51°45′11″N 1°15′26″W | | 1443614 | K6 Telephone Kiosk | Q66478565 |
| Beam Hall, With Number 3 | II* | 3, Merton Street | | | 12 January 1954 | SP5169806119; 51°45′05″N 1°15′09″W | | 1369414 | Beam Hall, With Number 3 More images | Q17548798 |
| Street Surface of Merton Street | II | Merton Street | | | 28 June 1972 | SP5180606134; 51°45′05″N 1°15′03″W | | 1119637 | Street Surface of Merton Street | Q26412946 |
| Merton College Stables | II | 4a, Merton Street | | | 12 January 1954 | SP5172106124; 51°45′05″N 1°15′08″W | | 1047223 | Merton College Stables More images | Q26299329 |
| Postmasters Hall | II | 5, Merton Street | | | 12 January 1954 | SP5173006127; 51°45′05″N 1°15′07″W | | 1323108 | Postmasters Hall More images | Q26608861 |
| 9, Merton Street | II | 9, Merton Street | | | 28 June 1972 | SP5179106143; 51°45′06″N 1°15′04″W | | 1047224 | 9, Merton Street | Q26299330 |
| Wall of Number 9 fronting Logic Lane | II | Merton Street | | | 28 June 1972 | SP5178506159; 51°45′06″N 1°15′04″W | | 1369415 | Wall of Number 9 fronting Logic Lane | Q26650755 |
| 13, Merton Street | II | 13, Merton Street | | | 12 January 1954 | SP5184206153; 51°45′06″N 1°15′01″W | | 1120878 | 13, Merton Street More images | Q26414080 |
| Sedan Hall | II | 14, Merton Street | | | 12 January 1954 | SP5185006152; 51°45′06″N 1°15′01″W | | 1047225 | Sedan Hall More images | Q26299331 |
| 15, Merton Street | II | 15, Merton Street | | | 12 January 1954 | SP5185906150; 51°45′06″N 1°15′01″W | | 1120888 | 15, Merton Street More images | Q26414088 |
| 16, Merton Street | II | 16, Merton Street | | | 12 January 1954 | SP5186706152; 51°45′06″N 1°15′00″W | | 1369416 | 16, Merton Street More images | Q26650756 |
| 17, Merton Street | II | 17, Merton Street | | | 12 January 1954 | SP5187406153; 51°45′06″N 1°15′00″W | | 1369398 | 17, Merton Street More images | Q26650741 |
| 18, Merton Street | II | 18, Merton Street | | | 12 January 1954 | SP5188206154; 51°45′06″N 1°14′59″W | | 1047186 | 18, Merton Street More images | Q26299289 |
| 5, New College Lane | II | 5, New College Lane | | | 28 June 1972 | SP5162006471; 51°45′16″N 1°15′13″W | | 1047196 | 5, New College Lane | Q26299299 |
| 6 and 7, New College Lane | II | 6 and 7, New College Lane | | | 12 January 1954 | SP5163606476; 51°45′17″N 1°15′12″W | | 1369401 | 6 and 7, New College Lane | Q26650743 |
| 8, New College Lane | II | 8, New College Lane | | | 12 January 1954 | SP5164606477; 51°45′17″N 1°15′12″W | | 1047197 | 8, New College Lane | Q26299300 |
| 1-7, Oriel Square | II | 1-7, Oriel Square | | | 12 January 1954 | SP5158406156; 51°45′06″N 1°15′15″W | | 1047167 | 1-7, Oriel Square More images | Q26299271 |
| 102 and 103, High Street | II | 1 and 2, Oriel Street | | | 12 January 1954 | SP5158806216; 51°45′08″N 1°15′15″W | | 1047251 | 102 and 103, High Street More images | Q26299357 |
| 3 and 4, Oriel Street | II | 3 and 4, Oriel Street | | | 12 January 1954 | SP5159006204; 51°45′08″N 1°15′15″W | | 1047168 | 3 and 4, Oriel Street More images | Q26299272 |
| 5, Oriel Street | II | 5, Oriel Street | | | 12 January 1954 | SP5159006195; 51°45′07″N 1°15′15″W | | 1047169 | 5, Oriel Street More images | Q26299274 |
| 6, Oriel Street | II | 6, Oriel Street | | | 12 January 1954 | SP5159006189; 51°45′07″N 1°15′15″W | | 1047170 | 6, Oriel Street More images | Q26299275 |
| 7 and 8, Oriel Street | II | 7 and 8, Oriel Street | | | 12 January 1954 | SP5159106181; 51°45′07″N 1°15′15″W | | 1047171 | 7 and 8, Oriel Street More images | Q26299276 |
| 9 and 10, Oriel Street | II | 9 and 10, Oriel Street | | | 12 January 1954 | SP5159106173; 51°45′07″N 1°15′15″W | | 1047172 | 9 and 10, Oriel Street More images | Q26299277 |
| 12, Oriel Street | II* | 12, Oriel Street | | | 12 January 1954 | SP5159106165; 51°45′07″N 1°15′15″W | | 1047173 | 12, Oriel Street | Q17548617 |
| 2, Queens Lane | II | 2, Queens Lane | | | 12 January 1954 | SP5183906281; 51°45′10″N 1°15′02″W | | 1369397 | 2, Queens Lane | Q26650740 |
| 2, Queens Lane, 39-41, High Street | II | 2, Queens Lane | | | 12 January 1954 | SP5184306272; 51°45′10″N 1°15′01″W | | 1047280 | 2, Queens Lane, 39-41, High Street | Q26299384 |
| Church of St Mary the Virgin | I | High Street / Radcliffe Square | | | 12 January 1954 | SP5161006274; 51°45′10″N 1°15′14″W | | 1047275 | Church of St Mary the Virgin More images | Q581986 |
| Wall and gates of the Church of St Mary the Virgin | II | High Street | | | 28 June 1972 | SP5161406257; 51°45′09″N 1°15′13″W | | 1047276 | Wall and gates of the Church of St Mary the Virgin | Q26299380 |
| Bodleian Library and Schools Quadrangle including the Divinity School and the Convocation House | I | Radcliffe Square, The Schools | | | 12 January 1954 | SP5155006415; 51°45′15″N 1°15′17″W | | 1047185 | Bodleian Library and Schools Quadrangle including the Divinity School and the Convocation House More images | Q82133 |
| Radcliffe Camera | I | Radcliffe Square | | | 12 January 1954 | SP5159106345; 51°45′12″N 1°15′14″W | | 1099146 | Radcliffe Camera More images | Q1602700 |
| Statue of the Earl of Pembroke in the Bodleian Schools Quadrangle | II | Radcliffe Square, The Schools | | | 28 June 1972 | SP5155406411; 51°45′14″N 1°15′16″W | | 1047149 | Statue of the Earl of Pembroke in the Bodleian Schools Quadrangle More images | Q26299254 |
| Street surface | II | Radcliffe Square | | | 28 June 1972 | SP5156906338; 51°45′12″N 1°15′16″W | | 1047150 | Street surface | Q26299255 |
| The screen between the Clarendon Building and the Bodleian Library fronting Catte Street | I | Radcliffe Square | | | 28 June 1972 | SP5157806461; 51°45′16″N 1°15′15″W | | 1047148 | The screen between the Clarendon Building and the Bodleian Library fronting Catte Street More images | Q96108540 |
| Wall between the Old Bodleian and Exeter College | II | The Schools, off Broad Street | | | 28 June 1972 | SP5150206421; 51°45′15″N 1°15′19″W | | 1348696 | Wall between the Old Bodleian and Exeter College | Q26632057 |
| Entrance Screen to Christchurch Meadows | II | Rose Lane | | | 28 June 1972 | SP5194306062; 51°45′03″N 1°14′56″W | | 1047152 | Entrance Screen to Christchurch Meadows | Q26299257 |
| Magdalen Gate House | II* | 61, High Street | | | 12 January 1954 | SP5199106188; 51°45′07″N 1°14′54″W | | 1047287 | Magdalen Gate House More images | Q17548666 |
| Wall and piers of Number 61 High Street, Magdalen Gate House | II | High Street | | | 12 January 1954 | SP5200406182; 51°45′07″N 1°14′53″W | | 1369363 | Wall and piers of Number 61 High Street, Magdalen Gate House | Q26650708 |
| Meadow Cottages | II | 1 and 2, Rose Lane | | | 12 January 1954 | SP5192706051; 51°45′03″N 1°14′57″W | | 1369420 | Meadow Cottages More images | Q26650760 |
| 1 and 2, Ship Street | II | 1 and 2, Ship Street | | | 12 January 1954 | SP5131506373; 51°45′13″N 1°15′29″W | | 1067775 | 1 and 2, Ship Street More images | Q26320572 |
| 3, Ship Street | II | 3, Ship Street | | | 12 January 1954 | SP5132606377; 51°45′13″N 1°15′28″W | | 1047124 | 3, Ship Street More images | Q26299234 |
| 4, Ship Street | II | 4, Ship Street | | | 12 January 1954 | SP5133206378; 51°45′13″N 1°15′28″W | | 1067749 | 4, Ship Street More images | Q26320546 |
| 5, Ship Street | II | 5, Ship Street | | | 12 January 1954 | SP5133706380; 51°45′14″N 1°15′28″W | | 1369469 | 5, Ship Street | Q26650800 |
| 6, Ship Street | II | 6, Ship Street | | | 12 January 1954 | SP5134206382; 51°45′14″N 1°15′27″W | | 1047086 | 6, Ship Street More images | Q26299199 |
| 8, Ship Street | II | 8, Ship Street | | | 12 January 1954 | SP5134606383; 51°45′14″N 1°15′27″W | | 1369470 | 8, Ship Street More images | Q26650801 |
| 9, Ship Street | II | 9, Ship Street | | | 12 January 1954 | SP5135006384; 51°45′14″N 1°15′27″W | | 1047087 | 9, Ship Street More images | Q26299200 |
| 10, Ship Street | II | 10, Ship Street | | | 12 January 1954 | SP5135306385; 51°45′14″N 1°15′27″W | | 1047088 | 10, Ship Street More images | Q26299201 |
| 11, Ship Street | II | 11, Ship Street | | | 12 January 1954 | SP5135806386; 51°45′14″N 1°15′27″W | | 1369471 | 11, Ship Street More images | Q26650802 |
| 12, Ship Street | II | 12, Ship Street | | | 12 January 1954 | SP5136206387; 51°45′14″N 1°15′26″W | | 1047089 | 12, Ship Street More images | Q26299202 |
| 13, Ship Street | II | 13, Ship Street | | | 12 January 1954 | SP5136806389; 51°45′14″N 1°15′26″W | | 1369472 | 13, Ship Street More images | Q26650803 |
| Bastion 5 Between Cornmarket Street And Catte Street | II | 14 and 15, Ship Street | | | 12 January 1954 | SP5138106391; 51°45′14″N 1°15′25″W | | 1047090 | Bastion 5 Between Cornmarket Street And Catte Street | Q26299203 |
| 16, Ship Street | II | 16, Ship Street | | | 12 January 1954 | SP5139006394; 51°45′14″N 1°15′25″W | | 1369473 | 16, Ship Street More images | Q26650804 |
| 26, Ship Street | II* | 26, Ship Street | | | 12 January 1954 | SP5129206349; 51°45′13″N 1°15′30″W | | 1047091 | 26, Ship Street More images | Q17548530 |
| The Turf Tavern | II | 10, St Helens Passage | | | 12 January 1954 | SP5166706484; 51°45′17″N 1°15′10″W | | 1369443 | The Turf Tavern More images | Q7854865 |
| 3, Turl Street | II | 3, Turl Street | | | 12 January 1954 | SP5145706245; 51°45′09″N 1°15′21″W | | 1047096 | 3, Turl Street | Q26299209 |
| 6 and 7, Turl Street | II | 6 and 7, Turl Street | | | 28 June 1972 | SP5145206265; 51°45′10″N 1°15′22″W | | 1369437 | 6 and 7, Turl Street | Q26650774 |
| 8 and 9, Turl Street | II | 8 and 9, Turl Street | | | 28 June 1972 | SP5144906279; 51°45′10″N 1°15′22″W | | 1049042 | 8 and 9, Turl Street | Q26301096 |
| 10-12, Turl Street | II | 10-12, Turl Street | | | 12 January 1954 | SP5144606290; 51°45′11″N 1°15′22″W | | 1047097 | 10-12, Turl Street | Q26299210 |
| 13, Turl Street | II | 13, Turl Street | | | 28 June 1972 | SP5144106297; 51°45′11″N 1°15′22″W | | 1051102 | 13, Turl Street | Q26303021 |
| 14, Turl Street | II | 14, Turl Street | | | 12 January 1954 | SP5144006303; 51°45′11″N 1°15′22″W | | 1369438 | 14, Turl Street | Q26650775 |
| 16, Turl Street | II | 16, Turl Street | | | 28 June 1972 | SP5140706400; 51°45′14″N 1°15′24″W | | 1047098 | 16, Turl Street | Q26299211 |
| 17-19, Turl Street | II | 17-19, Turl Street | | | 28 June 1972 | SP5140406410; 51°45′15″N 1°15′24″W | | 1372887 | 17-19, Turl Street More images | Q26653934 |

== See also ==
- Grade I listed buildings in Oxfordshire
- Grade II* listed buildings in Oxfordshire

== Sources ==
- Bradley, Simon; Pevsner, Nikolaus; Sherwood, Jennifer (2024), Oxford and the South-East, The Buildings of England, New Haven and London: Yale University Press, ISBN 978-0-300-20929-7
