= Grade I listed buildings in South Oxfordshire =

There are over 9,000 Grade I listed buildings in England. This page is a list of these buildings in the district of South Oxfordshire in Oxfordshire.

== List of buildings ==
| Name | Location | Type | Completed (Note: The date given is the date used by Historic England as significant for the initial building or that of an important part in the structure's description.) | Date designated | Grid ref. (Note: Sometimes known as OSGB36, the grid reference is based on the British national grid reference system used by the Ordnance Survey.) Geo-coordinates | Entry number (Note: The "List Entry Number" is a unique number assigned to each listed building and scheduled monument by Historic England.) | Image |
|---|---|---|---|---|---|---|---|
| Beckley Park | Beckley | House | c.1540 | 18 July 1963 | SP5772211975; 51°48′12″N 1°09′51″W | 1180781 | Beckley Park More images |
| Church of the Assumption of the Blessed Virgin Mary | Beckley | Church | 14th century | 18 July 1963 | SP5622711262; 51°47′50″N 1°11′10″W | 1047650 | Church of the Assumption of the Blessed Virgin Mary More images |
| Church of St Bartholomew | Brightwell Baldwin | Church | 13th century | 18 July 1963 | SU6532095002; 51°39′00″N 1°03′26″W | 1059763 | Church of St Bartholomew More images |
| Small's House | Mackney, Brightwell-cum-Sotwell | House | c.1580 | 9 April 1952 | SU5790989973; 51°36′20″N 1°09′55″W | 1368884 | Small's House More images |
| Church of St Mary | Chalgrove | Church | Early 13th century | 18 July 1963 | SU6371696549; 51°39′51″N 1°04′49″W | 1284879 | Church of St Mary More images |
| The Manor | Chalgrove | Hall House | Early 15th century | 18 July 1963 | SU6306197027; 51°40′07″N 1°05′22″W | 1368856 | Upload Photo |
| Church of St Peter and St Paul | Checkendon | Church | 12th century | 9 February 1959 | SU6632283040; 51°32′33″N 1°02′42″W | 1180822 | Church of St Peter and St Paul More images |
| Church of St Andrew | Chinnor | Church | Early 13th century | 18 July 1963 | SP7567900889; 51°42′06″N 0°54′23″W | 1368881 | Church of St Andrew More images |
| Church of St Mary | Cholsey | Church | 11th century | 14 June 1963 | SU5837487007; 51°34′44″N 1°09′32″W | 1059283 | Church of St Mary More images |
| Church of St Mary Magdalene | Crowmarsh Gifford | Church | 12th century | 9 February 1959 | SU6146689314; 51°35′58″N 1°06′50″W | 1059582 | Church of St Mary Magdalene More images |
| Church of All Saints | Cuddesdon | Church | Mid–late 12th century | 18 July 1963 | SP6007803045; 51°43′23″N 1°07′54″W | 1047709 | Church of All Saints More images |
| Abbey Church of St Peter and St Paul | Dorchester on Thames | Abbey | 1140–1536 | 18 July 1963 | SU5792794196; 51°38′37″N 1°09′51″W | 1193595 | Abbey Church of St Peter and St Paul More images |
| Churchyard cross approximately 6 metres south of Dorchester Abbey | Dorchester on Thames | Cross | 14th/15th century | 18 July 1963 | SU5789094188; 51°38′37″N 1°09′53″W | 1047865 | Churchyard cross approximately 6 metres south of Dorchester Abbey |
| Church of St Andrew | East Hagbourne | Church | 12th century | 14 June 1963 | SU5254988196; 51°35′25″N 1°14′34″W | 1047927 | Church of St Andrew More images |
| Church of St Mary | Ewelme | Church | c.1432 | 18 July 1963 | SU6466091405; 51°37′04″N 1°04′03″W | 1059360 | Church of St Mary More images |
| Ewelme Church of England Primary School | Ewelme | School | c.1450 | 18 July 1963 | SU6459891360; 51°37′03″N 1°04′06″W | 1369062 | Ewelme Church of England Primary School More images |
| Gods Place, and lobby to Church of St Mary | Ewelme | Almshouse | c.1437 | 18 July 1963 | SU6463691394; 51°37′04″N 1°04′04″W | 1369023 | Gods Place, and lobby to Church of St Mary More images |
| School House and archway | Ewelme | School house | Mid-15th century | 18 July 1963 | SU6460491379; 51°37′03″N 1°04′06″W | 1059349 | School House and archway |
| Church of St Thomas of Canterbury | Goring on Thames | Church | 12th century | 9 February 1959 | SU5976480711; 51°31′20″N 1°08′24″W | 1194201 | Church of St Thomas of Canterbury More images |
| Alnutts Hospital and attached forecourt walls and gate | Goring Heath | Almshouses | c. 1724 | 24 October 1951 | SU6569779447; 51°30′37″N 1°03′17″W | 1194275 | Alnutts Hospital and attached forecourt walls and gate More images |
| Church of St Peter | Great Haseley | Church | c. 1200 | 18 July 1963 | SP6443101695; 51°42′37″N 1°04′08″W | 1047529 | Church of St Peter More images |
| Tithe barn at Church Farm and attached wall at the stables | Great Haseley | Tithe barn | c. 1400 | 18 July 1963 | SP6444501765; 51°42′39″N 1°04′07″W | 1047532 | Upload Photo |
| Church of St Mary | Great Milton | Church | 11th century | 18 July 1963 | SP6279902422; 51°43′01″N 1°05′33″W | 1369258 | Church of St Mary More images |
| Chantry House | Henley-on-Thames | Chantry college | c. 1400 | 25 January 1951 | SU7629382693; 51°32′17″N 0°54′05″W | 1047033 | Chantry House More images |
| Henley Bridge | Henley-on-Thames | Bridge | 1786 | 25 January 1951 | SU7634282644; 51°32′15″N 0°54′02″W | 1369131 | Henley Bridge More images |
| Church of St Bartholomew | Holton | Church | Late 12th century | 18 July 1963 | SP6051806391; 51°45′11″N 1°07′29″W | 1047596 | Church of St Bartholomew More images |
| Church Farm, barn approximately 30 metres ESE of farmhouse (not included) | Lewknor | House | Mid-/late 14th century | 19 November 1976 | SU7150697658; 51°40′23″N 0°58′02″W | 1368861 | Upload Photo |
| Church of St Margaret | Lewknor | Church | Late 12th century | 18 July 1963 | SU7157297650; 51°40′23″N 0°57′59″W | 1182190 | Church of St Margaret More images |
| Haseley Court | Little Haseley | Country house | 14th century | 18 July 1963 | SP6449300596; 51°42′01″N 1°04′06″W | 1047539 | Haseley Court More images |
| Church of St Mary | Long Wittenham | Church | c. 1120 | 14 June 1963 | SU5484894043; 51°38′33″N 1°12′32″W | 1368798 | Church of St Mary More images |
| Church of St Margaret and Bardolf Aisle | Mapledurham | Church | 13th century | 9 February 1959 | SU6700576676; 51°29′06″N 1°02′11″W | 1059519 | Church of St Margaret and Bardolf Aisle More images |
| Mapledurham House | Mapledurham | Country house | c. 1585 | 24 October 1951 | SU6706776655; 51°29′06″N 1°02′08″W | 1368944 | Mapledurham House More images |
| Church of St Giles | Newington | Church | 12th century | 18 July 1963 | SU6087896527; 51°39′51″N 1°07′16″W | 1193229 | Church of St Giles More images |
| Church of All Saints | North Moreton | Church | Early 13th century | 14 June 1963 | SU5620689569; 51°36′08″N 1°11′24″W | 1181258 | Church of All Saints More images |
| Church of St Mary | North Stoke | Church | 13th century | 9 February 1959 | SU6089786210; 51°34′17″N 1°07′22″W | 1059577 | Church of St Mary More images |
| Carfax Conduit | Nuneham Courtenay | Conduit | 1617 | 18 July 1963 | SU5372797671; 51°40′31″N 1°13′28″W | 1193569 | Carfax Conduit More images |
| Rycote Chapel | Rycote | Church | 1449 | 18 July 1963 | SP6669904651; 51°44′12″N 1°02′08″W | 1047514 | Rycote Chapel More images |
| Greys Court | Rotherfield Greys | House | 14th century | 24 October 1951 | SU7248283417; 51°32′42″N 0°57′22″W | 1181202 | Greys Court More images |
| Greys Court, Dower House | Rotherfield Greys | Dower house | 16th century | 24 October 1951 | SU7254483383; 51°32′41″N 0°57′19″W | 1047391 | Greys Court, Dower House More images |
| Greys Court, Great Tower, attached ruined tower and walls approximately 60 metres east | Rotherfield Greys | Fortified house | 14th century | 24 October 1951 | SU7254183441; 51°32′43″N 0°57′19″W | 1181246 | Greys Court, Great Tower, attached ruined tower and walls approximately 60 metres east More images |
| Greys Court, the Keep | Rotherfield Greys | Keep | 14th century | 24 October 1951 | SU7244983374; 51°32′41″N 0°57′24″W | 1369333 | Greys Court, the Keep More images |
| Greys Court, Well House | Rotherfield Greys | Timber-framed house | 16th century | 24 October 1951 | SU7246783373; 51°32′41″N 0°57′23″W | 1369334 | Greys Court, Well House More images |
| Shirburn Castle | Shirburn | Castle | 1377 | 18 July 1963 | SU6966095976; 51°39′30″N 0°59′40″W | 1368852 | Shirburn Castle More images |
| Shotover Park | Shotover | Country house | c.1715–20 | 18 July 1963 | SP5841506714; 51°45′22″N 1°09′18″W | 1284986 | Shotover Park More images |
| Church of St John the Baptist | Stanton St. John | Church | c. 1200 | 18 July 1963 | SP5775009372; 51°46′48″N 1°09′51″W | 1182305 | Church of St John the Baptist More images |
| Stonor House and attached walls and buildings | Stonor | Country house | 13th century | 24 October 1951 | SU7425289228; 51°35′49″N 0°55′46″W | 1059444 | Stonor House and attached walls and buildings More images |
| Chapel approximately 10 metres south of the Prebendal | Thame | Chapel | c. 1250 | 24 April 1951 | SP7021906359; 51°45′06″N 0°59′03″W | 1180882 | Chapel approximately 10 metres south of the Prebendal |
| Church of St Mary | Thame | Church | Early 13th century | 24 April 1951 | SP7038506318; 51°45′04″N 0°58′54″W | 1194053 | Church of St Mary More images |
| Thame Park House | Thame | Country house | 14th century | 24 April 1951 | SP7167203727; 51°43′40″N 0°57′49″W | 1368734 | Thame Park House More images |
| Fragment of castle wall at Wallingford Castle | Wallingford | Bailey | 13th century | 9 December 1949 | SU6096589780; 51°36′13″N 1°07′16″W | 1181852 | Upload Photo |
| Remains of Queen's Tower, Wallingford Castle | Wallingford | Castle | 13th century | 9 December 1949 | SU6103489717; 51°36′11″N 1°07′12″W | 1059619 | Remains of Queen's Tower, Wallingford Castle More images |
| Remains of St Nicholas's College | Wallingford | Motte and bailey | 13th century | 9 December 1949 | SU6090489595; 51°36′07″N 1°07′19″W | 1181912 | Remains of St Nicholas's College More images |
| Town Hall | Wallingford | Guildhall | c. 1670 | 9 December 1949 | SU6071689359; 51°35′59″N 1°07′29″W | 1368477 | Town Hall More images |
| Church of St Mary | Waterperry | Church | Saxon | 18 July 1963 | SP6295606322; 51°45′07″N 1°05′22″W | 1047587 | Church of St Mary More images |
| Church of St Mary, churchyard cross approximately 10 metres to south | Waterperry | Cross | Medieval | 5 June 1985 | SP6295706309; 51°45′07″N 1°05′22″W | 1047588 | Church of St Mary, churchyard cross approximately 10 metres to south |
| Church of St Andrew | Wheatfield | Church | 14th century | 18 July 1963 | SU6886799274; 51°41′17″N 1°00′19″W | 1059672 | Church of St Andrew More images |
| Hardwick House | Whitchurch-on-Thames | Country house | Early 16th century | 24 October 1951 | SU6593377732; 51°29′41″N 1°03′06″W | 1180567 | Hardwick House More images |
| Hardwick House: Dower House approximately 5 metres west | Whitchurch-on-Thames | House | Late 17th century | 16 August 1985 | SU6592477748; 51°29′41″N 1°03′06″W | 1059525 | Hardwick House: Dower House approximately 5 metres west |
| Church of the Holy Rood | Woodeaton | Church | 13th century | 18 July 1963 | SP5348911898; 51°48′11″N 1°13′32″W | 1047562 | Church of the Holy Rood More images |
| Woodeaton Cross | Woodeaton | Village cross | Medieval | 18 July 1963 | SP5349811960; 51°48′13″N 1°13′32″W | 1047563 | Woodeaton Cross More images |
| The Old Brewhouse with entrance screen, Woodperry House | Woodperry, Stanton St. John | Country house | 1728–31 | 18 July 1963 | SP5751010430; 51°47′22″N 1°10′03″W | 1047582 | The Old Brewhouse with entrance screen, Woodperry House More images |

== See also ==
- Grade I listed buildings in Oxfordshire
- Grade I listed buildings in Cherwell (district)
- Grade I listed buildings in Oxford
- Grade I listed buildings in Vale of White Horse
- Grade I listed buildings in West Oxfordshire
- Grade II* listed buildings in South Oxfordshire
