= Corn Exchange, Wallingford =

Commercial building in Wallingford, Oxfordshire, England

- Corn Exchange, Wallingford

- Shown in Oxfordshire
- 51.5998°N 1.1243°W
- Location: Market Place, Wallingford

History
- Built: 1856

Site notes
- Architectural style: Italianate style

Listed Building – Grade II
- Official name: Corn Exchange Theatre
- Designated: 1 October 1975
- Reference no.: 1048499

The Corn Exchange is a commercial building in the Market Place, Wallingford, Oxfordshire, England. The structure, which is used as a theatre, is a Grade II listed building.

== History ==
Until the mid-19th century, corn merchants traded from the ground floor of Wallingford Town Hall. In the early 1850s, a group of local businessmen decided to form a company, to be known as the "Wallingford Corn Exchange Company", to finance and commission a purpose-built corn exchange for the town. The site they selected was on the east side of the Market Place.

The new building was designed in the Italianate style, built in ashlar stone and was completed in 1856. The design involved a symmetrical main frontage of three bays facing onto the Market Place. The central bay featured a round headed doorway with a carved tympanum, a canted surround, an architrave and a keystone with a carved mask. The doorway was flanked by Corinthian order pilasters supporting an entablature, while the outer bays were fenestrated by paired round headed sash windows. There were oculi in the spandrels above the outer bay windows and there were rusticated Doric order pilasters at the corners of the building. At roof level, there was a large pediment containing a clock. The iron arches supporting the roof of the building were cast at the Wilders Foundry on Goldsmiths Lane.

The building was also used for public events: speakers included the former Virginia slave and anti-slavery campaigner, Henry Box Brown, who visited the building in May 1859. The use of the building as a corn exchange declined significantly in the wake of the Great Depression of British Agriculture in the late 19th century. It was used as a cinema during the First World War and during the inter-war years.

After the Second World War, it was used by the Ministry of Pensions and National Insurance as a food and unemployment office, before falling into disuse. In 1975, the building was acquired by the local amateur dramatic society, the Sinodun Players, whose president had been Dame Agatha Christie from 1951 until her death in 1976. Following the completion of a major programme of refurbishment works, the building was re-opened as a theatre by Sir Peter Hall in 1978. It was subsequently extended at the rear such that it stretched back to Wood Street.

The building was used to depict the "Causton Playhouse" in the crime drama series, Midsomer Murders, during filming of the first series in 1998. The corn exchange and Sinodun Players were awarded the Queen's Award for Voluntary Service in 2020.

== See also ==
- Corn exchanges in England
