= Grade I listed buildings in Vale of White Horse =

There are more than 9,000 Grade I listed buildings in England. This page is a list of these buildings in the district of Vale of White Horse in Oxfordshire.

== List of buildings ==
Name	Location	Type	Completed (Note: The date given is the date used by Historic England as significant for the initial building or that of an important part in the structure's description.)	Date designated	Grid ref. (Note: Sometimes known as OSGB36, the grid reference is based on the British national grid reference system used by the Ordnance Survey.) Geo-coordinates	Entry number (Note: The "List Entry Number" is a unique number assigned to each listed building and scheduled monument by Historic England.)	Image
Abbey Gate	Abingdon Abbey	Gateway	Late 15th century	19 January 1951	SU4985097076; 51°40′13″N 1°16′50″W	1368671	Abbey Gate More images
Brick Alley Almshouses	Abingdon	Almshouse	1718	10 December 1971	SU4969696732; 51°40′02″N 1°16′58″W	1200005	Brick Alley Almshouses More images
Church of St Helen	Abingdon	Church	Late 12th or early 13th century	19 January 1951	SU4969496775; 51°40′03″N 1°16′58″W	1300979	Church of St Helen More images
Church of St Nicholas	Abingdon	Church	c.1170	19 January 1951	SU4984397082; 51°40′13″N 1°16′50″W	1048110	Church of St Nicholas More images
County Hall and Market House	Abingdon	County hall	1678–83	19 January 1951	SU4978597051; 51°40′12″N 1°16′53″W	1199601	County Hall and Market House More images
Long Alley Almshouses	Abingdon	Almshouses	c.1500	19 January 1951	SU4966396729; 51°40′02″N 1°17′00″W	1048811	Long Alley Almshouses More images
The Checker Unicorn Theatre	Abingdon Abbey	Abbey	13th century	19 January 1951	SU4997397022; 51°40′11″N 1°16′44″W	1048108	The Checker Unicorn Theatre More images
The Long Gallery	Abingdon Abbey	Abbey	c.1500	19 January 1951	SU4999097035; 51°40′12″N 1°16′43″W	1048107	The Long Gallery More images
Unicorn Theatre	Abingdon Abbey	House	13th century	19 January 1951	SU4996397012; 51°40′11″N 1°16′44″W	1048844	Unicorn Theatre More images
Ashdown House	Ashbury	Country house	c.1662	10 November 1952	SU2820382009; 51°32′11″N 1°35′41″W	1048765	Ashdown House More images
Ashdown House, pavilion and attached wall approximately 20 metres south-east	Ashbury	Pavilion	c.1662	10 November 1952	SU2823482003; 51°32′10″N 1°35′40″W	1048767	Ashdown House, pavilion and attached wall approximately 20 metres south-east More images
Ashdown House, pavilion approximately 20 metres north-east	Ashbury	Pavilion	c.1662	10 November 1952	SU2822582033; 51°32′11″N 1°35′40″W	1048766	Ashdown House, pavilion approximately 20 metres north-east More images
Church of St Mary	Ashbury	Church	12th century	21 November 1966	SU2653284919; 51°33′45″N 1°37′07″W	1048770	Church of St Mary More images
Church of St Nicholas	Baulking	Church	Mid-13th century	21 November 1966	SU3172690705; 51°36′51″N 1°32′36″W	1048680	Church of St Nicholas More images
Church of St Michael	Blewbury	Church	11th century	24 November 1966	SU5314685917; 51°34′11″N 1°14′05″W	1368625	Church of St Michael More images
Church of St Mary	Buckland	Church	1707	21 November 1966	SU3427398205; 51°40′54″N 1°30′20″W	1181905	Church of St Mary More images
The Church of St Mary	Buscot	Church	13th century	21 November 1966	SU2265998142; 51°40′54″N 1°40′25″W	1368093	The Church of St Mary More images
Charney Manor	Charney Bassett	Manor house	Late 13th century	10 November 1952	SU3810794442; 51°38′51″N 1°27′02″W	1182077	Charney Manor More images
Church of St Peter	Charney Bassett	Church	Early 12th century	21 November 1966	SU3809994425; 51°38′50″N 1°27′03″W	1182087	Church of St Peter More images
Church of St Mary	Childrey	Church	Early 13th century	24 November 1966	SU3600387794; 51°35′16″N 1°28′54″W	1048743	Church of St Mary More images
Coleshill Park, Great Piers, including cast-iron gates	Coleshill	Gate	Late 18th century	10 November 1952	SU2422093902; 51°38′36″N 1°39′05″W	1052691	Coleshill Park, Great Piers, including cast-iron gates More images
Compton Beauchamp House and walling and attached bridge to north	Compton Beauchamp	Country house	16th century	10 November 1952	SU2798686926; 51°34′50″N 1°35′51″W	1368367	Compton Beauchamp House and walling and attached bridge to north More images
Church of St Michael	Cumnor	Church	Late 12th century	9 February 1966	SP4614704134; 51°44′02″N 1°19′59″W	1048342	Church of St Michael More images
Jesus Chapel and Attached House	East Hendred	House	15th century	25 October 1951	SU4604688891; 51°35′49″N 1°20′12″W	1048167	Jesus Chapel and Attached House More images
Church of All Saints	Faringdon	Church	12th century	21 November 1966	SU2887395724; 51°39′34″N 1°35′02″W	1199147	Church of All Saints More images
Faringdon House	Faringdon	Country house	1770–85	10 November 1952	SU2879195900; 51°39′40″N 1°35′07″W	1048410	Upload Photo
The Great Barn	Great Coxwell	Barn	Early 13th century	21 November 1966	SU2689694029; 51°38′40″N 1°36′46″W	1183045	The Great Barn More images
Church of St Mary	Longworth	Church	Early 13th century	21 November 1966	SU3840599468; 51°41′34″N 1°26′45″W	1048616	Church of St Mary More images
Milton Manor Cottage and Milton Manor House	Milton	Manor house	c.1776	6 August 1952	SU4841392385; 51°37′42″N 1°18′07″W	1048220	Milton Manor Cottage and Milton Manor House More images
Church of St Faith	Shellingford	Church	12th century	2 November 1966	SU3195193515; 51°38′22″N 1°32′23″W	1368447	Church of St Faith More images
China House to west of Beckett Hall	Shrivenham	Fishing lodge	c.1635–55	21 July 1982	SU2460189120; 51°36′01″N 1°38′46″W	1048793	China House to west of Beckett Hall
Church of St Andrew	Shrivenham	Church	Early 15th century	21 November 1966	SU2407589078; 51°36′00″N 1°39′14″W	1284309	Church of St Andrew More images
Church of the Holy Rood	Sparsholt	Church	Late 12th century	24 November 1966	SU3468487540; 51°35′08″N 1°30′03″W	1048702	Church of the Holy Rood More images
Church of St Denys	Stanford in the Vale	Church	Late 12th century	21 November 1966	SU3419693468; 51°38′20″N 1°30′26″W	1048607	Church of St Denys More images
Church of St Michael and All Angels	Steventon	Church	Early 14th century	9 February 1966	SU4644191427; 51°37′11″N 1°19′50″W	1181950	Church of St Michael and All Angels More images
Church of All Saints	Sutton Courtenay	Church	13th to 15th century	9 February 1966	SU5048594194; 51°38′39″N 1°16′18″W	1182209	Church of All Saints More images
The Abbey	Sutton Courtenay	House	16th century	6 September 1952	SU5026994000; 51°38′33″N 1°16′30″W	1052729	The Abbey More images
The Norman Hall	Sutton Courtenay	House	Late 12th century	6 August 1952	SU5042694266; 51°38′42″N 1°16′21″W	1182314	The Norman Hall More images
Church of St Mary	Uffington	Church	c.1250	11 December 1985	SU3023089317; 51°36′07″N 1°33′54″W	1198865	Church of St Mary More images
Church of St Peter and St Paul	Wantage	Church	Late 13th century	22 April 1950	SU3969087912; 51°35′19″N 1°25′43″W	1048567	Church of St Peter and St Paul More images
Church of the Holy Trinity	West Hendred	Church	14th century	24 November 1966	SU4473288281; 51°35′30″N 1°21′20″W	1200322	Church of the Holy Trinity More images
Wytham Abbey and attached wall	Wytham	Country house	Late 15th and 16th century	6 August 1952	SP4741608515; 51°46′24″N 1°18′51″W	1368599	Wytham Abbey and attached wall More images

== See also ==
- Grade II* listed buildings in Vale of White Horse
- Grade I listed buildings in Oxfordshire
  - Grade I listed buildings in Cherwell (district)
  - Grade I listed buildings in Oxford
  - Grade I listed buildings in South Oxfordshire
  - Grade I listed buildings in West Oxfordshire
