= Grade I listed buildings in West Oxfordshire =

There are over 9,000 Grade I listed buildings in England. This page is a list of these buildings in the district of West Oxfordshire in Oxfordshire.

== List of buildings ==
Name	Location	Type	Completed (Note: The date given is the date used by Historic England as significant for the initial building or that of an important part in the structure's description.)	Date designated	Grid ref. (Note: Sometimes known as OSGB36, the grid reference is based on the British national grid reference system used by the Ordnance Survey.) Geo-coordinates	Entry number (Note: The "List Entry Number" is a unique number assigned to each listed building and scheduled monument by Historic England.)	Image
Church of St Mary	Bampton	Church	10th/11th century	12 September 1955	SP3126203325; 51°43′40″N 1°32′56″W	1053559	Church of St Mary More images
Church of St Mary the Virgin	Black Bourton	Church	Early 12th century	12 September 1955	SP2865704231; 51°44′10″N 1°35′11″W	1367683	Church of St Mary the Virgin More images
Blenheim Palace	Blenheim, Woodstock	Country house	1706–29	27 August 1957	SP4412416054; 51°50′29″N 1°21′39″W	1052912	Blenheim Palace More images
Hensington Gate	Blenheim, Woodstock	Gateway	1706–10	27 August 1957	SP4476316567; 51°50′45″N 1°21′06″W	1368005	Hensington Gate More images
New Bridge	Blenheim	Bridge	1773	27 August 1957	SP4440015244; 51°50′03″N 1°21′25″W	1368023	New Bridge More images
Water Terrace Gardens, Bernini Fountain on West Terrace	Blenheim Palace	Statue	Late 17th century	27 August 1957	SP4398216000; 51°50′27″N 1°21′47″W	1052889	Water Terrace Gardens, Bernini Fountain on West Terrace
Woodstock Gate	Blenheim	Arch	1723	27 August 1957	SP4426416716; 51°50′50″N 1°21′32″W	1203507	Woodstock Gate More images
Church of St Peter and St Paul	Broadwell	Church	12th century	12 September 1955	SP2521904162; 51°44′08″N 1°38′10″W	1199110	Church of St Peter and St Paul More images
Burford Priory and Chapel	Burford	House	Late 16th century	12 September 1955	SP2497612354; 51°48′33″N 1°38′21″W	1224759	Burford Priory and Chapel More images
Church of St John the Baptist	Burford	Church	Late 15th century	12 September 1955	SP2531312402; 51°48′35″N 1°38′03″W	1053287	Church of St John the Baptist More images
Church of St Peter	Cassington	Church	Pre-1123	12 September 1955	SP4547410604; 51°47′32″N 1°20′31″W	1367949	Church of St Peter More images
Church of St Mary	Charlbury	Church	12th–16th century	27 August 1956	SP3556019427; 51°52′20″N 1°29′06″W	1053232	Church of St Mary More images
Chastleton House	Chastleton	Country house	1603–18	15 December 1954	SP2482729093; 51°57′35″N 1°38′24″W	1197988	Chastleton House More images
Church of St Mary	Chipping Norton	Church	c.1485 (nave)	23 April 1952	SP3117127350; 51°56′38″N 1°32′53″W	1052637	Church of St Mary More images
Church of St Laurence	Combe	Church	Early 12th century	27 August 1957	SP4138715879; 51°50′24″N 1°24′02″W	1283757	Church of St Laurence More images
Cornbury House	Cornbury and Wychwood	House	Late 16th century	27 August 1957	SP3503118126; 51°51′38″N 1°29′34″W	1053113	Cornbury House More images
Church of St Bartholomew	Ducklington	Church	Late 12th century	12 September 1955	SP3590807592; 51°45′57″N 1°28′52″W	1183324	Church of St Bartholomew More images
Old Radcot Bridge (that part in Grafton and Radcot parish)	Grafton and Radcot	Bridge	13th and 14th century	30 March 1989	SU2856099410; 51°41′34″N 1°35′18″W	1053405	Old Radcot Bridge (that part in Grafton and Radcot parish) More images
Radcot Bridge (that part in town of Great Faringdon)	Great Faringdon	Bridge	Early 14th century	21 November 1966	SU2856199405; 51°41′34″N 1°35′18″W	1048414	Radcot Bridge (that part in town of Great Faringdon) More images
Church of St Michael and All Angels	Great Tew	Church	Late 12th century	27 August 1956	SP3992628874; 51°57′25″N 1°25′13″W	1193136	Church of St Michael and All Angels More images
Church of St Peter and St Paul	Church Hanborough, Hanborough	Church	Early 12th century	12 September 1955	SP4258212837; 51°48′45″N 1°23′01″W	1052991	Church of St Peter and St Paul More images
Church of St Nicholas	Idbury	Church	12th century	27 August 1957	SP2361220041; 51°52′42″N 1°39′30″W	1367780	Church of St Nicholas More images
Kelmscott Manor	Kelmscott	Manor house	c.1570	12 September 1955	SU2509698888; 51°41′17″N 1°38′18″W	1199373	Kelmscott Manor More images
Church of St Matthew	Langford	Church	Mid–late 11th century	12 September 1955	SP2491102530; 51°43′15″N 1°38′27″W	1053385	Church of St Matthew More images
Church of Saint Kenelm	Minster Lovell	Church	Mid-15th century	12 September 1955	SP3240211371; 51°48′00″N 1°31′53″W	1053434	Church of Saint Kenelm More images
Minster Lovell Manor Ruins	Minster Lovell	Courtyard house	c.1431–42	12 September 1955	SP3244211344; 51°47′59″N 1°31′51″W	1053431	Minster Lovell Manor Ruins More images
Church of St Mary	North Leigh	Church	Early 11th century	12 September 1955	SP3873313657; 51°49′13″N 1°26′22″W	1283536	Church of St Mary More images
Church of St Denys	Northmoor	Church	Early 13th century	12 September 1955	SP4211002874; 51°43′23″N 1°23′30″W	1048936	Church of St Denys More images
New Bridge and flanking walls (that part in Northmoor civil parish)	Northmoor	Bridge	14th century	12 September 1955	SP4036501404; 51°42′36″N 1°25′02″W	1368262	New Bridge and flanking walls (that part in Northmoor civil parish) More images
Church of St Andrew	Great Rollright, Rollright	Church	Late 12th century	27 August 1957	SP3268931496; 51°58′51″N 1°31′32″W	1052792	Church of St Andrew More images
Rousham House	Rousham	Country house	c.1635	27 August 1957	SP4783424221; 51°54′52″N 1°18′22″W	1052944	Rousham House More images
Church of St Mary	Shipton-under-Wychwood	Church	Early 13th century	27 August 1956	SP2796617980; 51°51′35″N 1°35′43″W	1182700	Church of St Mary More images
Church of St James	South Leigh	Church	Late 12th century	12 September 1955	SP3940109016; 51°46′42″N 1°25′49″W	1199106	Church of St James More images
Ditchley House including flanking pavilions	Ditchley Park, Spelsbury	Country house	1722	27 August 1957	SP3902021190; 51°53′16″N 1°26′04″W	1251422	Ditchley House including flanking pavilions More images
Church of St Michael	Stanton Harcourt	Church	Mid-12th century	12 September 1955	SP4167405653; 51°44′53″N 1°23′52″W	1053164	Church of St Michael More images
Manor Farmhouse approximately 70 metres south of Harcourt House	Stanton Harcourt	House	15th century	12 September 1955	SP4161105588; 51°44′51″N 1°23′55″W	1283234	Manor Farmhouse approximately 70 metres south of Harcourt House
Pope's Tower, approximately 35 metres south east of Harcourt House	Stanton Harcourt	Clerical dwelling	c.1470–71	12 September 1955	SP4163105637; 51°44′52″N 1°23′54″W	1053134	Pope's Tower, approximately 35 metres south east of Harcourt House More images
The Great Kitchen, approximately 40 metres south of Harcourt House	Stanton Harcourt	Kitchen	c.1485	12 September 1955	SP4160405607; 51°44′51″N 1°23′56″W	1053135	The Great Kitchen, approximately 40 metres south of Harcourt House
Church of St Mary	Westwell	Church	12th century	12 September 1955	SP2230910054; 51°47′19″N 1°40′41″W	1357134	Church of St Mary More images
Church of St Mary	Cogges, Witney	Church	Late 12th century	3 March 1988	SP3610309629; 51°47′03″N 1°28′41″W	1053065	Church of St Mary More images
Church of St Mary the Virgin	Witney	Church	Mid-13th century	14 May 1952	SP3562109248; 51°46′51″N 1°29′06″W	1053046	Church of St Mary the Virgin More images

== See also ==
- Grade II* listed buildings in West Oxfordshire
- Grade I listed buildings in Oxfordshire
- Grade I listed buildings in Cherwell (district)
- Grade I listed buildings in Oxford
- Grade I listed buildings in South Oxfordshire
- Grade I listed buildings in Vale of White Horse
