= Grade I listed buildings in Cherwell (district) =

There are over 9,000 Grade I listed buildings in England. This page is a list of these buildings in the district of Cherwell in Oxfordshire.

== List of buildings ==
Name	Location	Type	Completed (Note: The date given is the date used by Historic England as significant for the initial building or that of an important part in the structure's description.)	Date designated	Grid ref. (Note: Sometimes known as OSGB36, the grid reference is based on the British national grid reference system used by the Ordnance Survey.) Geo-coordinates	Entry number (Note: The "List Entry Number" is a unique number assigned to each listed building and scheduled monument by Historic England.)	Image
Church of St Mary	Adderbury East, Adderbury	Church	Early 13th century	8 December 1955	SP4708935378; 52°00′53″N 1°18′55″W	1200012	Church of St Mary More images
Church of St Mary	Banbury	Church	c.1790	9 April 1952	SP4540840551; 52°03′41″N 1°20′21″W	1369519	Church of St Mary More images
Church of St Michael	Barford St Michael	Church	c.1150	8 December 1955	SP4327032610; 51°59′25″N 1°22′17″W	1284140	Church of St Michael More images
Church of St Edburg	Bicester	Church	11th century	31 January 1952	SP5830222278; 51°53′46″N 1°09′15″W	1199769	Church of St Edburg More images
Church of St Mary	Bloxham	Church	12th century	8 December 1955	SP4301135679; 52°01′04″N 1°22′29″W	1284130	Church of St Mary More images
Broughton Castle and attached walls	Broughton	Manor house	14th century	8 December 1955	SP4180938173; 52°02′25″N 1°23′31″W	1248742	Broughton Castle and attached walls More images
Broughton Castle, gatehouse, bridge and curtain wall	Broughton	Gatehouse	14th century	8 December 1955	SP4180438242; 52°02′28″N 1°23′31″W	1248762	Broughton Castle, gatehouse, bridge and curtain wall More images
Broughton Castle, stable block	Broughton	Stable	15th century	8 December 1955	SP4184438246; 52°02′28″N 1°23′29″W	1277775	Broughton Castle, stable block More images
Church of St Mary the Virgin	Broughton	Church	c.1300	8 December 1955	SP4186138321; 52°02′30″N 1°23′28″W	1248778	Church of St Mary the Virgin More images
Church of St Peter	Bucknell	Church	11th/12th century	7 December 1966	SP5608425599; 51°55′34″N 1°11′09″W	1200258	Church of St Peter More images
Church of St Mary the Virgin	Charlton-on-Otmoor	Church	13th and 14th century	7 December 1966	SP5619415815; 51°50′17″N 1°11′09″W	1370086	Church of St Mary the Virgin More images
Old Manor Farmhouse	Cottisford	Farmhouse	13th/14th century	26 November 1951	SP5892231082; 51°58′30″N 1°08′37″W	1046440	Upload Photo
Church of St Mary the Virgin	Cropredy	Church	13th century	8 December 1955	SP4689946668; 52°06′59″N 1°18′59″W	1216164	Church of St Mary the Virgin More images
The Leadenporch House	Deddington	Farmhouse	Early 14th century	8 December 1955	SP4668031405; 51°58′45″N 1°19′18″W	1300760	The Leadenporch House More images
Chapel at Water Eaton Manor House	Water Eaton	Domestic chapel	c.1600	7 December 1966	SP5156712104; 51°48′19″N 1°15′13″W	1046563	Chapel at Water Eaton Manor House More images
Church of St Peter	Hanwell	Church	13th century	8 December 1955	SP4357243575; 52°05′20″N 1°21′56″W	1216364	Church of St Peter More images
Church of St Peter	Hook Norton	Church	12th century	8 December 1955	SP3551233125; 51°59′44″N 1°29′03″W	1369840	Church of St Peter More images
Church of St Ethelreda	Horley	Church	12th century	8 December 1955	SP4168543965; 52°05′33″N 1°23′35″W	1216504	Church of St Ethelreda More images
Church of St John the Baptist	Hornton	Church	12th century	8 December 1955	SP3922245005; 52°06′07″N 1°25′44″W	1227940	Church of St John the Baptist More images
Church of St Nicholas	Islip	Church	11th century	7 December 1966	SP5265214095; 51°49′23″N 1°14′15″W	1046574	Church of St Nicholas More images
Church of St Mary	Kidlington	Church	12th century	7 December 1966	SP4972314809; 51°49′47″N 1°16′48″W	1291046	Church of St Mary More images
Kirtlington Park	Kirtlington	Country house	1742–46	26 November 1951	SP5082219833; 51°52′29″N 1°15′47″W	1200202	Kirtlington Park More images
Church of the Assumption of the Blessed Virgin Mary	Launton	Church	Late 12th century	7 December 1966	SP6043822827; 51°54′03″N 1°07′23″W	1369735	Church of the Assumption of the Blessed Virgin Mary More images
Church of St Swithun	Merton	Church	13th century	7 December 1966	SP5773717816; 51°51′21″N 1°09′47″W	1369750	Church of St Swithun More images
Middleton Park	Middleton Stoney	Country house	1938	26 November 1951	SP5249223237; 51°54′19″N 1°14′18″W	1232948	Middleton Park More images
Church of St Michael and All Angels	Alkerton	Church	c.1200	8 December 1955	SP3772142924; 52°05′00″N 1°27′03″W	1300845	Church of St Michael and All Angels More images
Church of St James	Somerton	Church	12th century	7 December 1966	SP4968828631; 51°57′14″N 1°16′42″W	1225707	Church of St James More images
Churchyard cross approximately 12 metres north of church of St James	Somerton	Cross	Medieval	26 February 1988	SP4970428645; 51°57′15″N 1°16′41″W	1225734	Churchyard cross approximately 12 metres north of church of St James More images
Church of St Peter ad Vincula	South Newington	Church	12th century	8 December 1955	SP4074733338; 51°59′49″N 1°24′29″W	1277633	Church of St Peter ad Vincula More images
Church of St Mary and St Edburga	Stratton Audley	Church	14th and 15th century	7 December 1966	SP6085826036; 51°55′46″N 1°06′59″W	1046404	Church of St Mary and St Edburga More images
Church of St Peter and St Paul	Swalcliffe	Church	Saxon	8 December 1955	SP3785737892; 52°02′17″N 1°26′58″W	1199016	Church of St Peter and St Paul More images
Manor House	Swalcliffe	Hall house	13th century	8 December 1955	SP3780537905; 52°02′18″N 1°27′01″W	1046268	Upload Photo
Tithe Barn	Swalcliffe	Tithe barn	c.1400	8 December 1955	SP3774537919; 52°02′18″N 1°27′04″W	1046267	Tithe Barn More images
Church of St Nicholas	Tadmarton	Church	12th century	8 December 1955	SP3923837856; 52°02′16″N 1°25′46″W	1369852	Church of St Nicholas More images
Tithe Barn approximately 30 metres south of Manor Farmhouse	Upper Heyford	Tithe barn	c.1400	26 November 1951	SP4944425812; 51°55′43″N 1°16′56″W	1266058	Tithe Barn approximately 30 metres south of Manor Farmhouse More images
Church of St Mary Magdalene	Wardington	Church	12th century	8 December 1955	SP4911246334; 52°06′47″N 1°17′03″W	1228671	Church of St Mary Magdalene More images
Church of Saint Giles	Wigginton	Church	13th century	8 December 1955	SP3907733282; 51°59′48″N 1°25′56″W	1052175	Church of Saint Giles More images
Wroxton College and attached walls and steps	Wroxton	Country house	c.1618	8 December 1955	SP4166141622; 52°04′17″N 1°23′37″W	1046769	Wroxton College and attached walls and steps More images
Church of St Bartholomew	Yarnton	Church	12th century	7 December 1966	SP4776711676; 51°48′06″N 1°18′31″W	1290230	Church of St Bartholomew More images

== See also ==
- Grade I listed buildings in Oxfordshire
  - Grade I listed buildings in Oxford
  - Grade I listed buildings in South Oxfordshire
  - Grade I listed buildings in Vale of White Horse
  - Grade I listed buildings in West Oxfordshire
- Grade II* listed buildings in Cherwell (district)
