= Wallingford Town Hall =

Municipal building in Wallingford, Oxfordshire, England

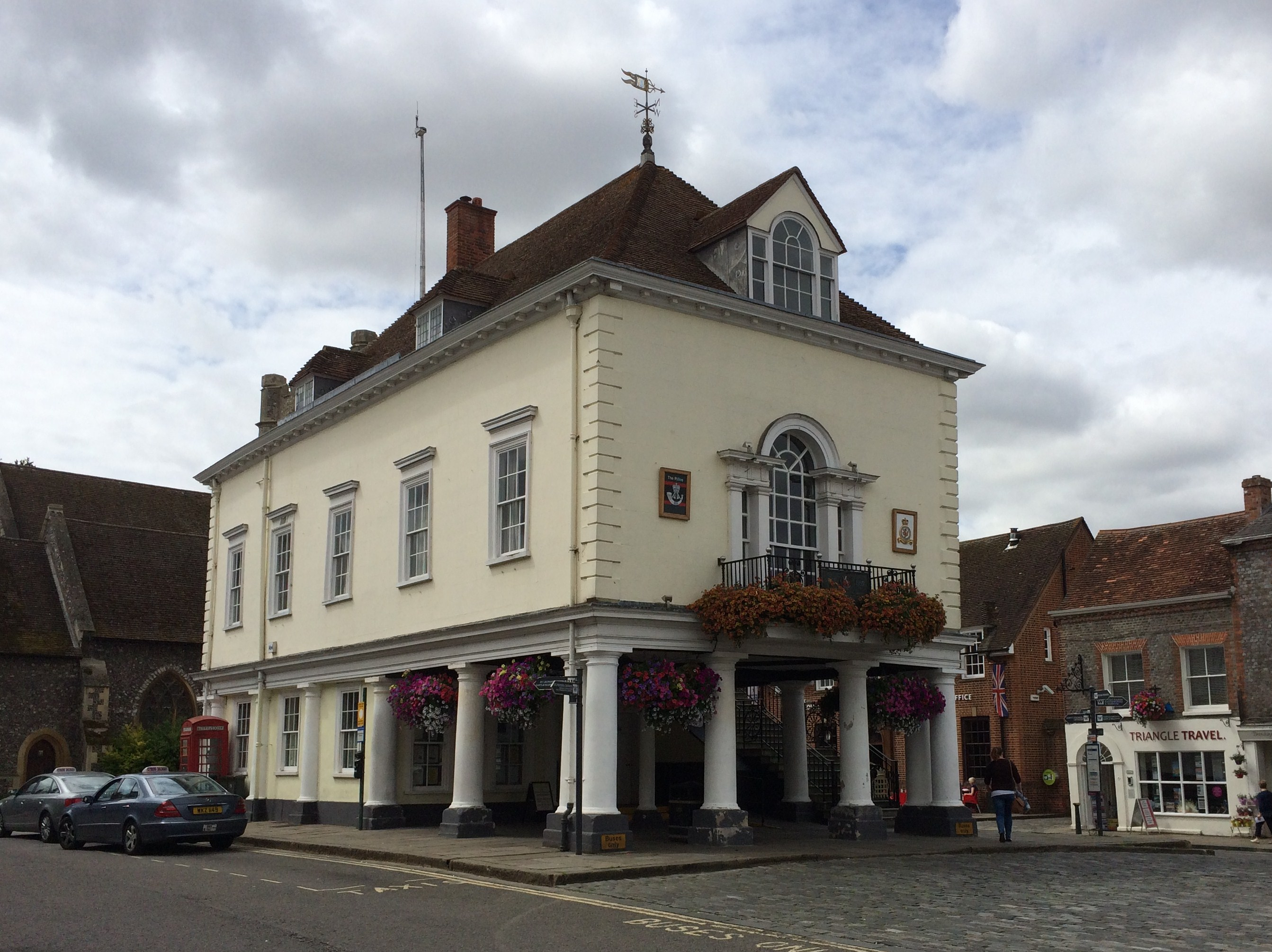
- Wallingford Town Hall

- Shown in Oxfordshire
- 51.5998°N 1.1248°W
- Location: Market Place, Wallingford

History
- Built: 1670; 356 years ago

Site notes
- Architectural style: Neoclassical style

Listed Building – Grade I
- Official name: Town Hall
- Designated: 9 December 1949
- Reference no.: 1368477

Wallingford Town Hall is a municipal building in the Market Place in Wallingford, Oxfordshire, England. The building, which is the meeting place of Wallingford Town Council, is a Grade I listed building.

== History ==
=== Early history ===
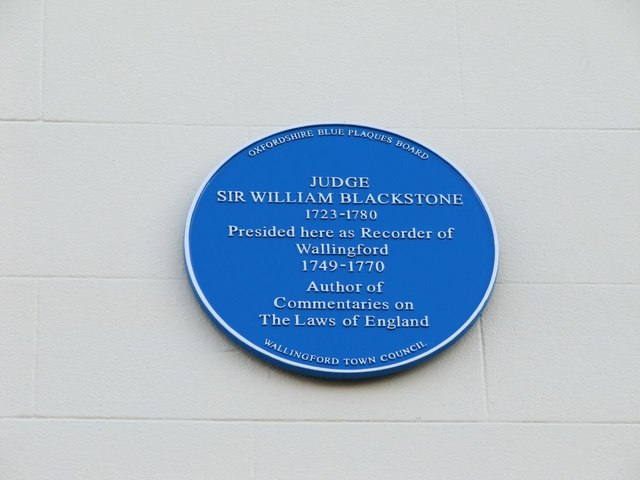
Plaque commemorating the work of Sir William Blackstone

The first municipal building in the town was a medieval guildhall which dated back to the early 14th century. Following the siege of Wallingford in 1645, a skirmish in the English Civil War at which many of the town's buildings were damaged or destroyed by the attacking roundhead forces, the borough council decided to demolish the old guildhall. The site selected for the new building, to the south of St Mary-le-More Church, was purchased from a local landowner, James Leaver. The new building was designed in the neoclassical style, built using timber-frame construction techniques with a stucco finish and was completed in 1670.

The design involved a symmetrical main frontage facing onto the Market Square; the ground floor was arcaded with a series of Doric order columns, so that markets could be held. On the first floor there was a central Venetian window with a wrought-iron balcony and, in the attic, there was a smaller Venetian style dormer window. The side elevations stretched back five bays on each side and were fenestrated by sash windows with architraves and cornices. Above, there was a modillioned cornice surmounted by a hipped roof with a weather vane. Internally, the principal rooms were the main chamber and the committee room, both on the first floor. A lock-up for petty criminals was established in the basement.

From an early stage, the main chamber was used for hearings of the borough courts and of the court of quarter sessions, while the attic was used as a school room. In the late 18th century the attic was used by the local congregational church until their chapel in the market place was completed in 1799. Markets were held on the ground floor until the Corn Exchange was built to the east of the town hall in 1856. Alterations were carried out in 1887, as part of the celebrations for the Golden Jubilee of Queen Victoria, to remove the attic and to create a coved ceiling in the main chamber. A war memorial, in the form of a plinth supporting a figure of a woman holding a wreath and intended to commemorate the lives of local service personnel who had died in the First World War, was unveiled outside the town hall by the Lord Lieutenant of Berkshire, James Benyon, on 22 May 1921. In 1933, the rear two bays were infilled at ground floor level and extended out to the west on both floors. An external flight of steps was added in front of the extension, leading up to a doorway on the first floor which gave access to the extension.

In September 1944, during the Second World War, two Royal Canadian Air Force officers, Flying Officer John Wilding, and Sergeant John Andrew, remained at the controls of a burning Halifax bomber of No. 426 Squadron RCAF, which was returning from an abandoned raid over the French port of Le Havre, and steered it away from Wallingford saving many civilian lives. The two airmen, who died in the ensuing air crash at Newnham Murren, were commemorated after the borough council decided to fly the Canadian flag over Wallingford Town Hall every year on 9 September in their memory.

=== Recent history ===
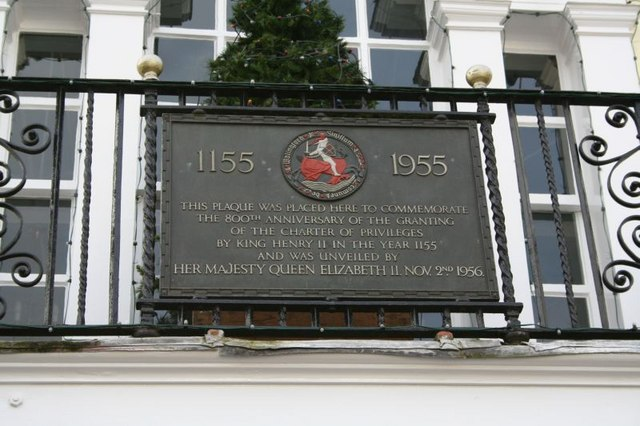
Plaque commemorating the visit of Queen Elizabeth II

Queen Elizabeth II visited the town hall and spoke to the crowd from the balcony during a visit in November 1956 to celebrate the 800th anniversary of the granting of the town's charter. The town hall continued to serve as the headquarters of the borough council for much of the 20th century but ceased to be the local seat of government when the enlarged South Oxfordshire District Council was formed in 1974. The main chamber subsequently became the meeting place of Wallingford Town Council, while the ground floor became the home of the local tourist information centre.

In October 2009, a blue plaque was installed on the west side of the town hall to commemorate the life of Sir William Blackstone, the author of Commentaries on the Laws of England, who sat in the town hall as Recorder of Wallingford, and, in 2011, plaques were placed on the front of the town hall to honour The Rifles, which, as the Royal Berkshire Regiment, had received the Freedom of the Borough in 1944, and RAF Benson, which had received the Freedom of the Borough in 1957. In 2014, the town hall was the location for the filming of a scene from The Incredible Adventures of Professor Branestawm starring Harry Hill.

Works of art in the town hall include a portrait by Gainsborough Dupont of Sir William Blackstone, a portrait by Thomas Lawrence of Jacob Pleydell-Bouverie, 2nd Earl of Radnor and a portrait by Anthony van Dyck of Archbishop William Laud. There is also a portrait by George Dunlop Leslie and James Hayllar of Queen Victoria, painted to celebrate her Golden Jubilee.

== See also ==
- Grade I listed buildings in South Oxfordshire
