= Grade II* listed buildings in Oxfordshire =

Oxfordshire shown within England

The county of Oxfordshire is divided into five districts. The districts of Oxfordshire are Oxford, Cherwell, South Oxfordshire, Vale of White Horse, and West Oxfordshire.

As there are 694 Grade II* listed buildings in the county they have been split into separate lists for each district.

- Grade II* listed buildings in Cherwell (district)
- Grade II* listed buildings in Oxford
- Grade II* listed buildings in South Oxfordshire
- Grade II* listed buildings in Vale of White Horse
- Grade II* listed buildings in West Oxfordshire

== See also ==
- Grade I listed buildings in Oxfordshire
- Category:Grade II* listed buildings in Oxfordshire
