= Grade I listed buildings in Oxfordshire =

Oxfordshire shown within England

There are approximately 372,905 listed buildings in England, with 2.5% classified as Grade I. Oxfordshire is divided into the districts of Oxford, Cherwell, South Oxfordshire, Vale of White Horse, and West Oxfordshire. The 381 Grade I listed buildings in the county have been organized into separate lists for each district.

- Grade I listed buildings in Cherwell (district)
- Grade I listed buildings in Oxford
- Grade I listed buildings in South Oxfordshire
- Grade I listed buildings in Vale of White Horse
- Grade I listed buildings in West Oxfordshire

== See also ==
- Category:Grade I listed buildings in Oxfordshire
- Grade II* listed buildings in Oxfordshire
