= Grade I listed buildings in Oxford =

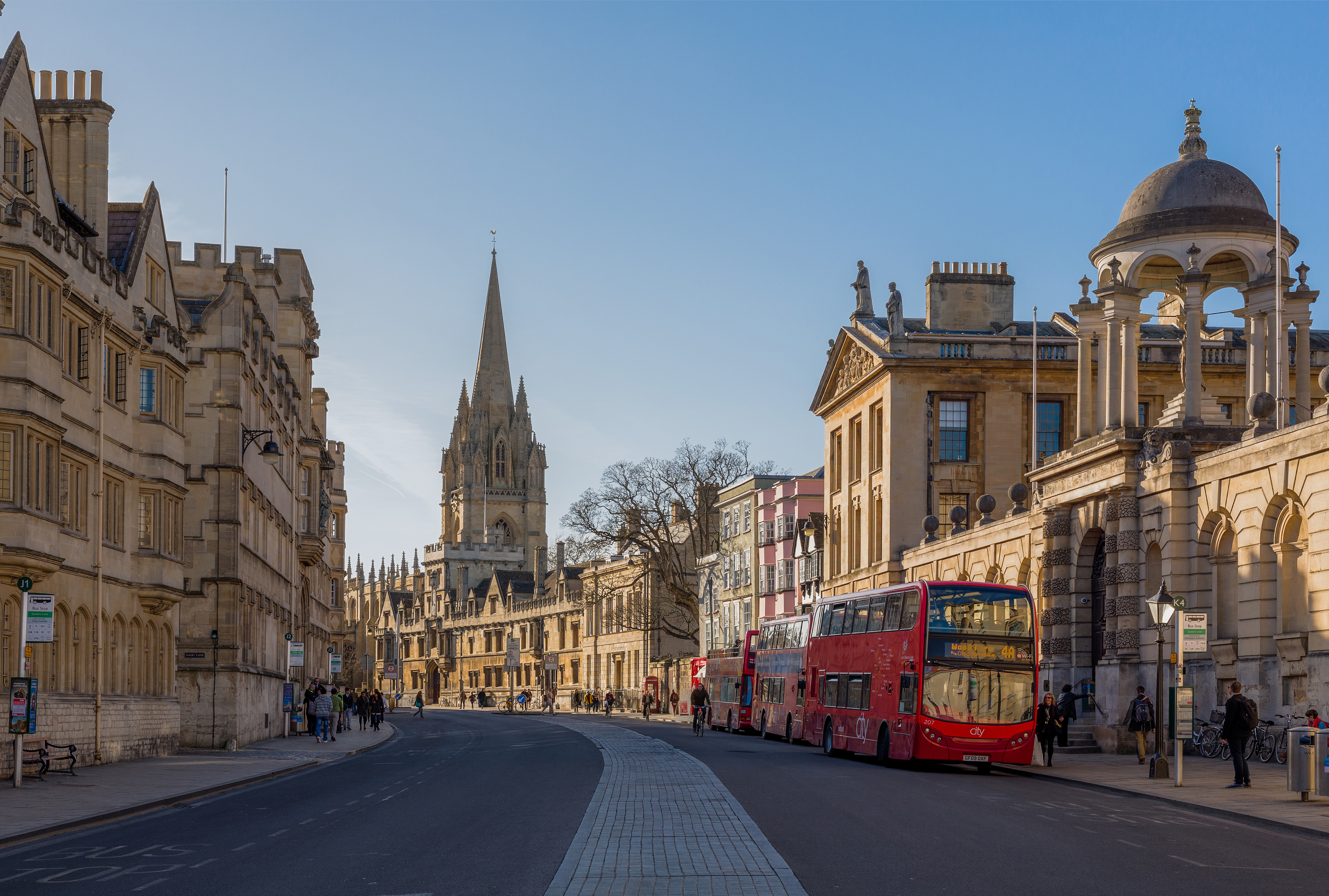
The High—"one of the world's great streets"—Nikolaus Pevsner (Note: To the right The Queen's College, to the left University College, ahead All Souls and the spire of the St Mary the Virgin. All have Grade I listings.)

The city of Oxford, England, was founded in the 8th century at a fording point at the confluence of the River Thames and the River Cherwell. The medieval period saw the development of the University of Oxford, the oldest in the English-speaking world. Oxford was granted city status in 1542, and both it and the university continued to expand, the wealth of the university and its benefactors enabling the construction of many buildings of note, by some of the country's most prominent architects. Many of these structures now enjoy statutory protection through the listed building scheme.

In the United Kingdom, the term "listed building" refers to a building or other structure officially designated as being of special architectural, historical or cultural significance. Listing was begun by a provision in the Town and Country Planning Act 1947. Once a building is listed, strict limitations are imposed on the modifications allowed to its structure or fittings. In England authority for listing lies with Historic England. Listed buildings are categorised into three grades:

- Grade I – buildings of exceptional interest; only 2.5%, some 9000 in total, of listed buildings in England and Wales are Grade I;
- Grade II* – buildings of particular importance with more than special interest; 5.8% of listed buildings in England and Wales are Grade II*;
- Grade II – buildings of special interest; 91.7% of all listed buildings in England and Wales are in this class.

The city and district of Oxford includes 199 Grade I listed buildings. The majority are elements of the university colleges including quadrangles, chapels, dining halls and common rooms. Others are major university buildings, such as the Bodleian Library and the Sheldonian Theatre. Some twenty-seven sections of the Oxford city walls, built between 1226 to 1240 to defend the town, are also listed. The university's botanic garden, the oldest in Britain, has a number of Grade I listed walls and gates. Lesser listed structures include No. 126 The High, the city's only remaining medieval shop-house, and St Catherine's College Bicycle Store, the only bike shed in Britain to hold a Grade I designation. The building material is, commonly, limestone such as the local Headington stone, (Note: The Headington stone does not always weather well. The frontage of Worcester College had to be refaced with synthetic stone in the 1920s, and again with Clipsham stone in the 1960s.) (Note: The entire north and west of the county of Oxfordshire sits within the Jurassic belt and the county was famous for its building stone. In the medieval period stone quarrying was second only to the wool trade in terms of its economic importance to the county.) or the Taynton limestone used at Merton College's Mob Quad. Brick is comparatively rare, although Keble College is a dramatic, 19th-century, exception. Marlstone, which weathers to a dark brown colour, was used for facings and for decoration, such as the dressings at the Oxford University Museum of Natural History.

The architects of most of the medieval and Tudor college buildings are unknown, although their founders are all recorded and comprise an array of clerical politicians such as William Waynflete at Magdalen College and William of Wykeham at New College. From the 17th century, as architect became a recognised profession, the names of the colleges' builders become known, notable among them in the 17th and 18th centuries being: Sir Christopher Wren, who worked in the Tudor Gothic style at Tom Tower at Christ Church, in conscious emulation of Cardinal Wolsey's original; James Gibbs, the architect of the Radcliffe Camera; (Note: John Radcliffe's executors considered a range of prominent architects when deciding to place the commission for the camera, including Christopher Wren, John Vanbrugh, James Thornhill, John James, Thomas Archer, Nicholas Hawksmoor, and James Gibbs but their deliberations were so protracted that the first three were dead by the time a decision was reached.) and Nicholas Hawksmoor with the Clarendon Building. In the late 18th century James Wyatt undertook renovation and redecoration at the dining hall and chapel at Worcester College. Architects of the 19th century include Charles Robert Cockerell at the Ashmolean Museum and William Butterfield at Keble. In the middle of the century, the Gothic architect William Burges was engaged to redecorate the chapel and hall at Worcester College, his work "swamp[ing]" Wyatt's of 60 years before. (Note: In the 1960s, the college fellows reinstated Wyatt's decoration of the hall. Nikolaus Pevsner's comment on their decision was: "Exit Burges. They will be sorry in fifty years".) Charles Eamer Kempe, a student at Pembroke College, and later a noted manufacturer of stained glass, undertook redecoration of the college chapel in the 1880s. At the very end of the century, George Frederick Bodley designed the church of St John the Evangelist in the south of the city, and worked on Tom Quad at Christ Church with his partner, Thomas Garner. Also at Christ Church is the Mercury Fountain, a lead statue donated in 1928, on a pedestal of 1935 to a design by Sir Edwin Lutyens. Oxford's other 20th-century Grade I listed buildings are the collection at St Catherine's by the Danish architect, Arne Jacobsen. (Note: Arne Jacobsen's work at St Catherine's is almost entirely in brick and reinforced concrete. In the 21st century the latter has been seriously affected by RAAC, necessitating closure of much of the complex and large-scale remedial works.)

== University colleges ==
Grade I listed buildings in Oxford – university colleges
Name	Location	Type	Completed (Note: The date given is the date used by Historic England as significant for the initial building or that of an important part in the structure's description.)	Date designated	Grid ref. (Note: The grid reference is based on the British national grid reference system, sometimes known as OSGB36, used by the Ordnance Survey.) Geo-coordinates	Notes	Entry number (Note: The "List Entry Number" is a unique number assigned to each listed building and scheduled monument by Historic England.)	Image
All Souls College, east and west ranges of the North Quadrangle	All Souls College	College quadrangle	1734 and 1748	12 January 1954	SP5162506345; 51°45′12″N 1°15′13″W	Designed by Nicholas Hawksmoor, the east range of the North Quadrangle is the "show side", with 15 bays and 2 dominating, early Gothic revival, towers.	1046761	All Souls College, east and west ranges of the North Quadrangle
All Souls College, Front (or south) Quadrangle, including chapel and south east range on The High	All Souls College	College quadrangle	1438–43	12 January 1954	SP5163706305; 51°45′11″N 1°15′12″W	The chapel, built to a T-plan, was restored by Henry Clutton in 1871–72. The quadrangle also contains the four-storey entrance gatehouse of the 15th century.	1046755	All Souls College, Front (or south) Quadrangle, including chapel and south east range on The High More images
All Souls College, hall, kitchen, buttery and passage between hall and kitchen	All Souls College	College dining hall	1730–41	12 January 1954	SP5167606328; 51°45′12″N 1°15′10″W	The hall and buttery are also by Nicholas Hawksmoor, who is commemorated in a bust by Henry Cheere, the "only known likeness" of the architect.	1046760	All Souls College, hall, kitchen, buttery and passage between hall and kitchen
All Souls College, All Souls College library	All Souls College	College library	1716–51 (sundial 1659)	12 January 1954	SP5164106386; 51°45′14″N 1°15′12″W	Designed by Nicholas Hawksmoor, the building was originally known as the Codrington Library after its funding benefactor, Christopher Codrington. The name was dropped in 2020, in response to the Black Lives Matter protests, which highlighted the extensive links between Codrington, his fortune, and his ownership of slave plantations in Barbados.	1046762	All Souls College, All Souls College library More images
Balliol College, old library, Front Quadrangle	Balliol College	College library	1431	12 January 1954	SP5134606484; 51°45′17″N 1°15′27″W	Forming two ranges of the Front Quadrangle, the old library and the old hall (see below), neither now used for their original purpose, are the only extant parts of the medieval college, Balliol being "essentially a 19th century" creation. The old library is of two periods, the 1430s when the western section was completed, and the 1470s, which saw the completion of the eastern section.	1046765	Balliol College, old library, Front Quadrangle More images
Balliol College, old hall (new library) and master's lodging, Front Quadrangle	Balliol College	College quadrangle	15th century	12 January 1954	SP5133506463; 51°45′16″N 1°15′28″W	The hall was completed around 1430 and was extensively re-modelled in the 1790s by James Wyatt to form part of the new library.	1369621	Balliol College, old hall (new library) and master's lodging, Front Quadrangle More images
Brasenose College, north range, Old Quadrangle	Brasenose College	College quadrangle	1509	12 January 1954	SP5153506350; 51°45′13″N 1°15′17″W	The ranges of Old Quad, the north, south and west, are notable for their large dormer windows, dating from the 17th century. The north range also displays a sundial of 1709.	1046730	Brasenose College, north range, Old Quadrangle
Brasenose College, west range, the Old Quadrangle	Brasenose College	College quadrangle	1509	12 January 1954	SP5151806327; 51°45′12″N 1°15′18″W	The west range has a datestone of 1509 and contains a smoking room designed by Sir Thomas Graham Jackson in 1899 and re-modelled by Sir Guy Dawber in the mid-1930s.	1046731	Brasenose College, west range, the Old Quadrangle
Brasenose College, east range, Old Quadrangle	Brasenose College	College quadrangle	1509	12 January 1954	SP5156106322; 51°45′12″N 1°15′16″W	The east range of the Old Quad gives Brasenose its entrance frontage, facing the Radcliffe Camera, and includes the four-storey gatehouse. John Chessell Buckler undertook much restoration in the 1860s.	1369646	Brasenose College, east range, Old Quadrangle More images
Brasenose College, south range, Old Quadrangle	Brasenose College	College quadrangle	1509	12 January 1954	SP5154306315; 51°45′11″N 1°15′17″W	The south range contains the college's hall. Above the internal dais, a door knocker is displayed, which likely dates from the 12th century. This is reputed to be the original knocker, the "brazen nose", from which the college's name is derived.	1369647	Brasenose College, south range, Old Quadrangle
Brasenose College, chapel, Second Quadrangle	Brasenose College	College chapel	1509	12 January 1954	SP5156406285; 51°45′10″N 1°15′16″W	The chapel dates from the 1650s. J. Mordaunt Crook, author of a history of the college, described it as "perplexingly, intriguingly hybrid", referencing the "classical vocabulary which is intermingled so potently with its Gothic detail". The chapel has a plaster vaulted ceiling.	1369648	Brasenose College, chapel, Second Quadrangle More images
Brasenose College, kitchen wing, Second Quadrangle	Brasenose College	College kitchen	15th century	12 January 1954	SP5154106301; 51°45′11″N 1°15′17″W	The medieval kitchen was constructed in the 15th century and was part of the accommodation of one of the ten halls which combined to form Brasenose Hall, the present college's predecessor body. The space was re-modelled in the 21st century as part of the college's quincentenary celebrations and now serves as a dining room.	1046732	Brasenose College, kitchen wing, Second Quadrangle
Brasenose College, library, Second Quadrangle	Brasenose College	College library	1664	12 January 1954	SP5156906303; 51°45′11″N 1°15′16″W	The first-floor library faces Radcliffe Square and dates from 1664, with later, late-18th century alterations by James Wyatt.	1046733	Brasenose College, library, Second Quadrangle
Brasenose College, little cloister, Second Quadrangle	Brasenose College	College quadrangle	1657	12 January 1954	SP5156906303; 51°45′11″N 1°15′16″W	The cloister forms the base to the library above. Dating from 1657, John Julius Norwich describes its design as "most curious" and defines it as "Commonwealth Baroque" and suggests it is the only such example in England. The cloister was re-modelled in the early 19th century.	1369649	Brasenose College, little cloister, Second Quadrangle More images
Christ Church Cathedral	Christ Church	Cathedral	13th century	12 January 1954	SP5154705977; 51°45′00″N 1°15′17″W	Established as St Frideswide's Priory, Thomas Wolsey had intended its demolition and replacement as part of his plans for Cardinal College. His fall saw Henry VIII convert the church into the chapel of his Christ Church foundation, and later, as a cost-saving measure, the cathedral of the newly created Diocese of Oxford. The cathedral was heavily restored by George Gilbert Scott in 1870–78.	1283787	Christ Church Cathedral More images
Christ Church Cathedral, chapter house and dorter range to south	Christ Church	Cathedral chapter house	1525	12 January 1954	SP5154005919; 51°44′59″N 1°15′17″W	The chapter house dates from 1140 and is one of the earliest elements of the cathedral.	1046739	Christ Church Cathedral, chapter house and dorter range to south More images
Christ Church, Tom Quad (Great Quadrangle)	Christ Church	College quadrangle	1526	12 January 1954	SP5141605984; 51°45′01″N 1°15′24″W	At 276 by 271 ft, Tom Quad is the largest in Oxford, intended by Thomas Wolsey as the centrepiece of his Cardinal College. The upper parts of the central Tom Tower are by Sir Christopher Wren, following Wolsey's Gothic style. The original plan had included an internal cloister but this was not realised. It includes the college hall in the southern range, and the deanery in the western. Extensive re-modelling was undertaken by George Frederick Bodley and Thomas Garner in the 1870s.	1198760	Christ Church, Tom Quad (Great Quadrangle) More images
Christ Church Mercury Fountain	Christ Church	Statue	1928	12 January 1954	SP5146505989; 51°45′01″N 1°15′21″W	The statue of Mercury stands in the centre of Tom Quad. Modelled on a 16th-century statue by Giambologna, it was donated to Christ Church in 1928, replacing an earlier one destroyed by Edward Smith-Stanley, 14th Earl of Derby, later three times Prime Minister. The basin is from the 1670s. The pedestal, of 1935, is by Sir Edwin Lutyens.	1046740	Christ Church Mercury Fountain More images
Christ Church, Peckwater Quadrangle	Christ Church	College quadrangle	1711	12 January 1954	SP5151806136; 51°45′06″N 1°15′18″W	Designed by Henry Aldrich, Dean of Christ Church, the quad was constructed in the early 18th century. (Note: Although an amateur, Henry Aldrich was a serious student of architecture. He authored a study of building, The Elements of Civil Architecture, in which he identified the "three chief properties of a building [as] utility, strength and beauty".) The builder was William Townesend. Aldrich's style is classical, with early indicators of the Palladian revival, in contrast to the Gothic generally prevalent in Oxford at the time. Aldrich's building, of a monumental 45 bays, forms three sides of the quad.	1198828	Christ Church, Peckwater Quadrangle More images
Christ Church library	Christ Church	College library	1716–61	12 January 1954	SP5153106074; 51°45′04″N 1°15′18″W	The library almost closes Peckwater Quad on the southern side. Constructed between 1717 and 1772, it was built to the designs of Dr. George Clarke. It is among the best examples of the Baroque in Oxford. The "superb" upper library on the first floor was planned by James Gibbs.	1046742	Christ Church library More images
Christ Church, Canterbury Quadrangle	Christ Church	College quadrangle	1778	12 January 1954	SP5157006063; 51°45′03″N 1°15′16″W	Canterbury Quad was a replacement for Canterbury College, one of Christ Church's predecessor halls. It was designed by James Wyatt in the 1770s, and largely paid for by Richard Robinson, Bishop of Armagh. It faces onto Oriel Square.	1369651	Christ Church, Canterbury Quadrangle More images
Corpus Christi College, Front Quadrangle, north, west and south-east ranges	Corpus Christi College	College quadrangle	early 16th century	12 January 1954	SP5159706079; 51°45′04″N 1°15′14″W	The Front Quad was erected between 1512 and 1518. The gatehouse faces Merton Street. The hall is in the east range, the library and chapel in the southern.	1369615	Corpus Christi College, Front Quadrangle, north, west and south-east ranges
Corpus Christi College hall	Corpus Christi College	College dining hall	early 16th century	12 January 1954	SP5163006075; 51°45′04″N 1°15′13″W	The hall has an original hammerbeam roof which was covered by an 18th-century ceiling until that was removed in a mid-Victorian restoration.	1046749	Corpus Christi College hall
Corpus Christi College library	Corpus Christi College	College library	early 16th century	12 January 1954	SP5161406041; 51°45′02″N 1°15′13″W	The college's founder, Richard Foxe, Bishop of Winchester, endowed a notable library, described by Erasmus in 1519 as "inter praecipua decora Britanniae" (among the chief beauties of Britain). The original mechanisms for the chaining of the books and the locking of the shelves remain in situ.	1199005	Corpus Christi College library More images
Corpus Christi College chapel	Corpus Christi College	College chapel	early 16th century	12 January 1954	SP5163806042; 51°45′03″N 1°15′12″W	The chapel is small and retains much late-17th-century carving, including the stalls and screen.	1198987	Corpus Christi College chapel More images
Corpus Christi College, sundial	Corpus Christi College	Statue	1581	12 January 1954	SP5161306061; 51°45′03″N 1°15′13″W	The Pelican Sundial stands in the centre of the Front Quad. Dating from 1581, and designed by Charles Turnbull, it features a number of sundials and a perpetual calendar.	1046710	Corpus Christi College, sundial More images
Corpus Christi College, cloister in Cloister Quadrangle	Corpus Christi College	College quadrangle	1712	12 January 1954	SP5164006037; 51°45′02″N 1°15′12″W	The Fellows (or Cloister) Quad is the smallest in Oxford and dates from the early 18th century.	1046712	Corpus Christi College, cloister in Cloister Quadrangle
Corpus Christi College, Fellows' Building, Cloister Quadrangle	Corpus Christi College	College quadrangle	1716	12 January 1954	SP5164006023; 51°45′02″N 1°15′12″W	The likely architect for the Fellows' Building is Henry Aldrich, Dean of Christ Church. The builder, as at Christ Church, was William Townesend. Of nine bays and three storeys, it was completed in 1716.	1046713	Corpus Christi College, Fellows' Building, Cloister Quadrangle
Corpus Christi College, Gentlemen Commoners' Buildings	Corpus Christi College	College quadrangle	1737	12 January 1954	SP5165406058; 51°45′03″N 1°15′11″W	The architect of the Gentlemen Commoners' Building is unknown, though the master mason and constructor was again William Townesend. A reconstruction dating from 1737, Pevsner described it as "decidedly conservative for its date".	1046714	Corpus Christi College, Gentlemen Commoners' Buildings
Exeter College, west range, Main Quadrangle	Exeter College	College quadrangle	1314	12 January 1954	SP5143606371; 51°45′13″N 1°15′23″W	The west range now provides the college's main entrance, fronting Turl Street. It dates from the late 17th and early 18th centuries, with the gate tower constructed in 1701–1703. The architecture was then Classical, but the frontage was given a Gothic makeover in 1834–1835. Sir Reginald Blomfield, a student at Exeter, added gables in 1907.	1199140	Exeter College, west range, Main Quadrangle More images
Exeter College, east range, Main Quadrangle (Armagh Building)	Exeter College	College quadrangle	1708	12 January 1954	SP5147606387; 51°45′14″N 1°15′20″W	The east range comprises Peryam's Building, dating from 1618, and the Armagh Building of 1708–1710.	1046720	Exeter College, east range, Main Quadrangle (Armagh Building)
Exeter College, north east range, Main Quadrangle	Exeter College	College quadrangle	1432–35	12 January 1954	SP5147206404; 51°45′14″N 1°15′21″W	The north range includes, at its northern corner, Palmer's Tower. Funded by William Palmer, then rector of the college, it dates from 1432, roughly a century after the college's foundation, and is now among its oldest remaining buildings.	1046719	Exeter College, north east range, Main Quadrangle
Exeter College, south-east range, Main Quadrangle	Exeter College	College quadrangle	1618	12 January 1954	SP5148406363; 51°45′13″N 1°15′20″W	The design of the south-east range was undertaken by Sir John Peryman. Opposite the south-east range on the northern side of the quad, is Sir George Gilbert Scott's "prodigious chapel". (Note: Opinions vary as to the merits of Scott's design. John Julius Norwich considered it "of unrelieved awfulness".) Of 1856 to 1859, the chapel is a Grade II* listed building.	1199135	Exeter College, south-east range, Main Quadrangle
Exeter College, south range, Main Quadrangle	Exeter College	College quadrangle	1618	12 January 1954	SP5146106352; 51°45′13″N 1°15′21″W	The south range accommodates the college hall, which was built in 1618. Originally classical, it was re-modelled in a Gothic taste by John Nash and George Stanley Repton in the early 19th century.	1369639	Exeter College, south range, Main Quadrangle
Jesus College, chapel, north range, First Quadrangle	Jesus College	College chapel	1571	12 January 1954	SP5141206365; 51°45′13″N 1°15′24″W	The college was founded in 1571 and the First Quadrangle is of this date, with later modifications, including the addition of much Gothic detail by John Nash and by John Chessell Buckler and his son Charles. The north range includes the chapel and the principal's lodgings. The chapel was restored in the 1860s by George Edmund Street.	1283432	Jesus College, chapel, north range, First Quadrangle More images
Jesus College, principal's lodging, north range, First Quadrangle	Jesus College	College quadrangle	c. 1625	12 January 1954	SP5139006358; 51°45′13″N 1°15′25″W	The principal's lodgings, which extend northwards into the Third Quad, were begun in the 1630s by Sir Eubule Thelwall for himself. George Frederick Bodley and Thomas Garner undertook restoration in the 1880s.	1046727	Jesus College, principal's lodging, north range, First Quadrangle
Jesus College, west range, First Quadrangle	Jesus College	College quadrangle	c. 1617	12 January 1954	SP5139106339; 51°45′12″N 1°15′25″W	The west range accommodates the hall, with an adjacent kitchen and buttery, dating from 1616. A plaster ceiling conceals the original hammerbeam roof. The hall contains some notable portraits, including one of Charles I by Anthony van Dyck and of Charles II by Peter Lely.	1046726	Jesus College, west range, First Quadrangle
Jesus College, east range, First Quadrangle	Jesus College	College quadrangle	1571	12 January 1954	SP5142406353; 51°45′13″N 1°15′23″W	The east range is largely a Victorian era restoration undertaken by John Chessell Buckler and Charles Alban Buckler although the gate onto Turl Street is earlier.	1283452	Jesus College, east range, First Quadrangle
Jesus College, south range, First Quadrangle	Jesus College	College quadrangle	1571	12 January 1954	SP5141606334; 51°45′12″N 1°15′24″W	The south range, the wing to the left in the image, is largely of original date, although the battlements are of 1815 by John Nash.	1369643	Jesus College, south range, First Quadrangle
Jesus College, north range, Inner (Second) Quadrangle	Jesus College	College quadrangle	1571	12 January 1954	SP5136406355; 51°45′13″N 1°15′26″W	The Second, or Inner, Quadrangle was constructed between 1639 and 1712, largely to a uniform design. The driving force was Francis Mansell, three-time principal between 1620 and 1661. Funding was generally by way of small donations, often from the college's strong Welsh contingent of former members.	1369644	Jesus College, north range, Inner (Second) Quadrangle
Jesus College, east range, Inner (Second) Quadrangle	Jesus College	College quadrangle	c. 1617	12 January 1954	SP5139106339; 51°45′12″N 1°15′25″W	The east range accommodates the hall.	1369645	Jesus College, east range, Inner (Second) Quadrangle
Jesus College, west range, Inner (Second) Quadrangle	Jesus College	College quadrangle	1679	12 January 1954	SP5135406328; 51°45′12″N 1°15′27″W	The west range, to the left of the image, accommodates the library, with the senior common room below. The library originally contained the Red Book of Hergest, among the most important of medieval Welsh manuscripts.	1283394	Jesus College, west range, Inner (Second) Quadrangle More images
Jesus College, south range, Inner (Second) Quadrangle	Jesus College	College quadrangle	1571	12 January 1954	SP5137806318; 51°45′12″N 1°15′26″W	The south range, in the right of the image, is a work of two parts; the eastern section dates from 1635 and the western part from 1676. The external frontage has a Victorian re-facing.	1046728	Jesus College, south range, Inner (Second) Quadrangle
Keble College, north (Liddon or Front) Quadrangle including chapel, hall and library	Keble College	College quadrangle	1868	12 January 1954	SP5130407011; 51°45′34″N 1°15′29″W	Built in polychromatic brick, a rarity among colleges in Oxford, Sir Kenneth Clark recalled Keble as "the ugliest building in the world". Designed by William Butterfield, the college was constructed between 1868–83. Liddon is the larger of the college's two quadrangles.	1046691	Keble College, north (Liddon or Front) Quadrangle including chapel, hall and library More images
Keble College, South (Pusey) Quadrangle	Keble College	College quadrangle	1868	12 January 1954	SP5134706895; 51°45′30″N 1°15′27″W	Pusey, Keble's secondary quad, includes the warden's lodgings and a clock turret.	1046692	Keble College, South (Pusey) Quadrangle More images
Lincoln College, north, east and west ranges, Front Quadrangle	Lincoln College	College quadrangle	1427	12 January 1954	SP5146306337; 51°45′12″N 1°15′21″W	Unusually, Lincoln's Front Quad remains of two storeys ensuring it retains "more of the character of a 15th century college than any other in Oxford". It has also retained the abundant Virginia creeper on its walls. The Front Quad is very largely of 15th century date, although re-modelling occurred in the 19th and 20th centuries.	1369669	Lincoln College, north, east and west ranges, Front Quadrangle
Lincoln College, south range, Front Quadrangle	Lincoln College	College quadrangle	1427	12 January 1954	SP5147006309; 51°45′11″N 1°15′21″W	The south range completes the Front Quad, and gives entry into the 17th-century chapel quad. It contains the Wesley Room, an imitation of 18th-century design undertaken in 1928.	1199585	Lincoln College, south range, Front Quadrangle
Lincoln College hall, Front Quadrangle	Lincoln College	College quadrangle	1436–37	12 January 1954	SP5148306328; 51°45′12″N 1°15′20″W	The hall, small in scale, retains much of its 15th-century appearance, although it was restored by Thomas Graham Jackson from 1889. Of particular note is the original roof, which Jackson uncovered by removing an 18th-century ceiling, and which has many original features including the opening through which smoke from the central fire was emitted.	1199578	Lincoln College hall, Front Quadrangle
Lincoln College kitchen north-east of hall, Front Quadrangle	Lincoln College	College kitchen	1436–37	12 January 1954	SP5149306344; 51°45′12″N 1°15′20″W	The kitchen is 15th-century in date with a "good timber roof, well preserved".	1369670	Lincoln College kitchen north-east of hall, Front Quadrangle
Lincoln College buttery, Front Quadrangle	Lincoln College	College quadrangle	1427	12 January 1954	SP5147906336; 51°45′12″N 1°15′20″W	The buttery, of the 15th century, was extensively rebuilt and re-modelled between 1999 and 2000.	1046699	Lincoln College buttery, Front Quadrangle
Lincoln College, old rector's lodging south of the hall, Front Quadrangle	Lincoln College	College quadrangle	1465–70	12 January 1954	SP5148506316; 51°45′11″N 1°15′20″W	The old rector's lodging, shown to the right of the hall in the image, occupies part of the east range. Within, the Beckington Room has examples of 17th-century wood carving of high quality.	1046700	Lincoln College, old rector's lodging south of the hall, Front Quadrangle
Lincoln College, east range and chapel, Chapel Quadrangle	Lincoln College	College quadrangle	1427	12 January 1954	SP5148006283; 51°45′10″N 1°15′20″W	The Chapel Quadrangle was begun at the very beginning of the 17th century and the chapel dates from the 1630s. Its scale is intimate but it contains a "rich" array of 17th-century furnishings, including rare stained glass by Abraham van Linge depicting biblical characters.	1046701	Lincoln College, east range and chapel, Chapel Quadrangle More images
Lincoln College, west range, Chapel Quadrangle	Lincoln College	College quadrangle	1427	12 January 1954	SP5146206288; 51°45′11″N 1°15′21″W	The west range is the earliest part of the chapel quad and retains its original mullion windows.	1283283	Lincoln College, west range, Chapel Quadrangle More images
Lincoln College library, formerly All Saints' Church	Lincoln College	College library	1720	12 January 1954	SP5148006232; 51°45′09″N 1°15′20″W	The college acquired the Church of All Saints in 1975 when the church was declared redundant. It lies at the southern end of the college site, at the junction of Turl Street and High Street. The architect of the original church is generally thought to be Henry Aldrich, Dean of Christ Church, although the involvement of Nicholas Hawksmoor has been suggested. Lincoln repurposed the church into its library, including the use of fittings from the old senior library, a conversion which John Julius Norwich considered "a triumph".	1047271	Lincoln College library, formerly All Saints' Church More images
Magdalen College, chapel, Great Quadrangle	Magdalen College	College quadrangle	1458	12 January 1954	SP5208206188; 51°45′07″N 1°14′49″W	Magdalen was built by William Waynflete, Bishop of Winchester and Lord Chancellor in the mid-15th century. Waynflete built outside of the city walls and Magdalen has a spaciousness rare among Oxford colleges. Construction of the main buildings began in 1474 and within six years, the Muniment Tower, the Founder's Tower, the hall, most of the Great Quadrangle and the chapel were largely complete. The chapel follows a T-plan and there is much 18th- and 19th-century reconstruction.	1369672	Magdalen College, chapel, Great Quadrangle More images
Magdalen College, cloister, Great Quadrangle	Magdalen College	College quadrangle	1475	12 January 1954	SP5213806200; 51°45′07″N 1°14′46″W	Waynflete incorporated his cloister into the quadrangle, an approach he had previously adopted at Eton College where he served as provost. It is of two storeys, with crenallations. Parts were reconstructed in the 19th century.	1283245	Magdalen College, cloister, Great Quadrangle More images
Magdalen College, hall, Great Quadrangle	Magdalen College	College quadrangle	1474–90	12 January 1954	SP5211506172; 51°45′07″N 1°14′47″W	The hall is situated on the Great Quadrangle's southern side, to the left of the chapel. It is placed on the first floor. The interior was restored in a Gothic style by George Frederick Bodley in the very early 20th century.	1046704	Magdalen College, hall, Great Quadrangle More images
Magdalen College, Founder's Tower, Great Quadrangle	Magdalen College	Tower	1474–90	12 January 1954	SP5208906216; 51°45′08″N 1°14′49″W	The four-storey tower was built as accommodation for Magdalen's president. It was decorated with becoming richness, although refurbishment designed by George Gilbert Scott and undertaken by John Crace in the 1850s has been removed.	1046705	Magdalen College, Founder's Tower, Great Quadrangle More images
Magdalen College, muniment tower, Great Quadrangle	Magdalen College	Tower	1487–88	12 January 1954	SP5208606209; 51°45′08″N 1°14′49″W	The three-storey tower is part of Waynflete's initial building campaign of the 1470s. The muniment room on the second floor retains the original storage cupboards for the college's records.	1369633	Magdalen College, muniment tower, Great Quadrangle
Magdalen College, old kitchen, rear of Great Quadrangle	Magdalen College	College kitchen	1629–35	12 January 1954	SP5213606165; 51°45′06″N 1°14′46″W	The old kitchen contains elements of St John's Hospital, the medieval foundation which originally stood on part of the college site. It abuts the southern edge of the great cloister, and the main chamber now serves as a student bar, after conversion in the 1980s.	1199704	Magdalen College, old kitchen, rear of Great Quadrangle
Magdalen College, range on High Street	Magdalen College	College quadrangle	1458	12 January 1954	SP5207806165; 51°45′06″N 1°14′49″W	The range fronting High Street culminates in the bell tower begun in the later phase of Waynflete's development, in 1492. Its four storeys are 144 ft high. The tower was much renewed in a restoration begun in the 1970s.	1199656	Magdalen College, range on High Street
Magdalen College, the New Buildings	Magdalen College	College quadrangle	1458	12 January 1954	SP5215106303; 51°45′11″N 1°14′45″W	The New Buildings face the northern side of the Great Quad, separated by gardens. They were designed in the 1730s by Edward Holdsworth, a poet rather than an architect, and are his only known design. A three-storey neoclassical block it runs for a total of twenty-seven bays.	1199727	Magdalen College, the New Buildings More images
Merton College, north range, Front Quadrangle	Merton College	College quadrangle	1274	12 January 1954	SP5173506111; 51°45′05″N 1°15′07″W	Merton has a strong claim to being Oxford's earliest college, and its Mob Quad the earliest quadrangle. The Front Quadrangle is of the 13th century, although the external frontage of the north range, facing onto Merton Street, was extensively rebuilt in the 1830s by Edward Blore. The gate tower has elements of work from 1416 and the 1450s.	1046679	Merton College, north range, Front Quadrangle
Merton College, chapel, Front Quadrangle	Merton College	College chapel	1290	12 January 1954	SP5169506083; 51°45′04″N 1°15′09″W	The chapel was begun in the 1290s, but the intended nave and aisles were never built. As such, it followed the T-plan initiated at New College and much imitated thereafter. Much of the stained glass is original, of the 13th century, and "one of the best sequences in the country".	1199994	Merton College, chapel, Front Quadrangle More images
Merton College, sacristy to the south-east of the chapel	Merton College	College chapel	1301-1311	12 January 1954	SP5171506078; 51°45′04″N 1°15′08″W	The sacristy dates from the very early 14th century, replacing the sacristy of the old Church of St John, which previously stood on the site. Historic England gives a build date of 1301, while the Victoria County History suggests 1310. It was much restored in the 19th century. For much of that century, the building was used to house the college brewery.	1046681	Merton College, sacristy to the south-east of the chapel
Merton College, south range Fitzjames Gateway, Front Quadrangle	Merton College	College quadrangle	15th century	12 January 1954	SP5176006087; 51°45′04″N 1°15′06″W	The south range contains the college Hall and the Fitzjames Gateway, built by a warden of the college in the 15th century. Its ceiling is decorated with Signs of the Zodiac.	1046680	Merton College, south range Fitzjames Gateway, Front Quadrangle More images
Merton College, north range, Mob Quadrangle	Merton College	College quadrangle	1304–1311	12 January 1954	SP5170006070; 51°45′03″N 1°15′09″W	Mob Quad dates from the late 13th century, and is the earliest complete quadrangle in the university. Of two storeys with attics, it stands to the south of the chapel. The north range is of 1304–1311.	1046682	Merton College, north range, Mob Quadrangle
Merton College, south and west ranges, Mob Quadrangle	Merton College	College quadrangle	1371–78	12 January 1954	SP5170306042; 51°45′03″N 1°15′09″W	The south and west ranges are the earliest elements and date from the 1280s. The corner angle contains the college Library. The original library stalls are the earliest known example of the type.	1369662	Merton College, south and west ranges, Mob Quadrangle
Merton College, east range, Mob Quadrangle	Merton College	College quadrangle	1274	12 January 1954	SP5171806062; 51°45′03″N 1°15′08″W	The east range was begun c. 1299, and contained accommodation for scholars.	1200028	Merton College, east range, Mob Quadrangle
Merton College, Fellows' Quadrangle	Merton College	College quadrangle	1608–10	12 January 1954	SP5175506039; 51°45′02″N 1°15′06″W	Fellows' Quad dates from 1609 and is the earliest three-storey quad in the city.	1200042	Merton College, Fellows' Quadrangle More images
New College, north range hall, kitchen and chapel, Great Quadrangle	New College	College dining hall	c. 1386	12 January 1954	SP5176306444; 51°45′15″N 1°15′05″W	New College was founded by William of Wykeham in 1379, just prior to his establishing Winchester College which was intended from the outset as the feeder school to the college. The scale of William's building was "unprecedented" and his builder is recorded as William Wynford. The Great (or Front) Quad was completed by 1386 and its north range houses the chapel, the hall and associated kitchens. The mid-19th-century restoration of the chapel undertaken by Sir George Gilbert Scott at a cost of nearly £24,000 is generally considered a mistake – John Julius Norwich thought it "disappointing" while the editors of the New College entry on the Victoria County History called the replacement of the medieval roof "a lamentable error of judgement".	1200433	New College, north range hall, kitchen and chapel, Great Quadrangle More images
New College, east range, Great Quadrangle	New College	College quadrangle	Late 14th century	12 January 1954	SP5177606417; 51°45′15″N 1°15′05″W	The east range concludes with the muniment tower and contains the two-storey old library. Both levels were reconstructed by James Wyatt.	1369665	New College, east range, Great Quadrangle
New College, south range, Great Quadrangle	New College	College quadrangle	1379 (crenellation 1674, fenestration 1718)	12 January 1954	SP5174106400; 51°45′14″N 1°15′07″W	The south range faces Queen's Lane.	1200417	New College, south range, Great Quadrangle
New College, west range, Great Quadrangle	New College	College quadrangle	15th century	12 January 1954	SP5170806420; 51°45′15″N 1°15′08″W	The west range contains the warden's lodgings. These were remodelled by W. D. Caröe in the early 20th century.	1046686	New College, west range, Great Quadrangle
New College, cloister to the west of the chapel	New College	College quadrangle	c. 1400	12 January 1954	SP5168106439; 51°45′15″N 1°15′10″W	The cloister dates from the 1390s. It was planned as a graveyard, and an area for contemplation. John Julius Norwich notes that it retains its medieval "remoteness – many a modern undergraduate scarcely sets foot in it throughout his three years in the college".	1046687	New College, cloister to the west of the chapel
New College, north range, Garden Quadrangle	New College	College quadrangle	1443, 1683, 1707	12 January 1954	SP5180906427; 51°45′15″N 1°15′03″W	The origin of the Garden Quad dates from the 1440s with the construction of the chequer building, but its expansion was undertaken in the late 17th century by William Byrd to provide accommodation for the increased number of undergraduates. The quad is enclosed by a screen in wrought iron by Thomas Robinson. The north range is to the right of the image.	1046688	New College, north range, Garden Quadrangle
New College, south range, Garden Quadrangle	New College	College quadrangle	1683–1700	12 January 1954	SP5180406400; 51°45′14″N 1°15′03″W	The Garden Quad was extended in the early 18th century, with blocks by Richard Piddlington and William Townesend. The south range is to the left of the image.	1300731	New College, south range, Garden Quadrangle
New College longhouse	New College	College building	Late 14th century	12 January 1954	SP5179806388; 51°45′14″N 1°15′04″W	The longhouse (or long room) dates from the late 14th century and functioned as a toilet block until the 1880s. Converted in the 20th century, and again in the 21st, it now offers an exhibition space.	1369667	New College longhouse
New College warden's barn	New College	College building	1402	12 January 1954	SP5167306426; 51°45′15″N 1°15′10″W	The warden's barn originally provided accommodation for guests of the college. It dates from 1401 and the name of the mason is recorded as John Martyn.	1369666	New College warden's barn
New College, bell tower	New College	Tower	1397	12 January 1954	SP5170006474; 51°45′16″N 1°15′09″W	The bell tower, off the cloister, dates from 1397, is of four-storeys, and is constructed of Headington stone.	1200452	New College, bell tower
Oriel College, Front Quadrangle, north and east ranges, including hall, chapel and kitchen	Oriel College	College quadrangle	1637–42	12 January 1954	SP5163006134; 51°45′06″N 1°15′13″W	The college was founded by Adam de Brome in 1324, under the patronage of Edward II but nothing of its medieval structure survives. The present first quadrangle was begun in 1620 and the east and north ranges incorporate the hall and chapel. These date from the end of the 17th-century building period, from 1637–1642. The east range was much restored around 1897.	1046656	Oriel College, Front Quadrangle, north and east ranges, including hall, chapel and kitchen More images
Oriel College, west range, Front Quadrangle	Oriel College	College quadrangle	1622	12 January 1954	SP5160006115; 51°45′05″N 1°15′14″W	The west range dates from the early 1620s and fronts onto Oriel Square.	1200587	Oriel College, west range, Front Quadrangle More images
Oriel College, south range, Front Quadrangle	Oriel College	College quadrangle	c. 1622	12 January 1954	SP5161806097; 51°45′04″N 1°15′13″W	The south range dates from 1622 and fronts onto Merton Street.	1046655	Oriel College, south range, Front Quadrangle
Oriel College, north range, Back Quadrangle	Oriel College	College quadrangle	1788	12 January 1954	SP5161906181; 51°45′07″N 1°15′13″W	The north range of the Back, or Second, Quad incorporates the senior common room on the ground floor and the college library above. This was built by James Wyatt from 1788.	1369690	Oriel College, north range, Back Quadrangle
Oriel College, east range, Back Quadrangle, Robinson Building	Oriel College	College quadrangle	1720	12 January 1954	SP5163606155; 51°45′06″N 1°15′12″W	The Robinson and Carter Buildings flank the Second Quad, the Robinson to the west, and the Carter Building to the east. Both date from the 1720s, when they were constructed to provide additional accommodation for students. The Robinson Building was designed by William Townesend.	1369688	Oriel College, east range, Back Quadrangle, Robinson Building
Oriel College, west range, Back Quadrangle, Carter Building	Oriel College	College quadrangle	1729	12 January 1954	SP5160206154; 51°45′06″N 1°15′14″W	The Robinson and Carter Buildings flank the second quad, the Robinson to the west, and the Carter Building to the east. Both date from the 1720s, when they were constructed to provide additional accommodation for students. The Carter Building was reconfigured in the 18th century to extend the provost's lodgings, and included a library, now the provost's study.	1369689	Oriel College, west range, Back Quadrangle, Carter Building
Oriel College, east range, St Mary's Quadrangle (former St Mary Hall)	Oriel College	College quadrangle	Before 1326, rebuilt 1743	12 January 1954	SP5163306211; 51°45′08″N 1°15′12″W	St Mary Hall operated as an independent institution from 1545 until 1902 and St Mary's quad includes the main auxiliary buildings, including hall and chapel, although these have both since been repurposed. The east range includes medieval elements but was largely rebuilt in the mid-18th century as lodgings for the college principal.	1369692	Oriel College, east range, St Mary's Quadrangle (former St Mary Hall)
Oriel College, south range, St Mary's Quadrangle (former St Mary Hall)	Oriel College	College quadrangle	Mid-15th century, rebuilt 1639–40	12 January 1954	SP5162306194; 51°45′07″N 1°15′13″W	The south range, originally St Mary's hall, is now the William Pantin library. William Pantin (1902–1973), a lecturer in History at Oriel, and the University of Oxford Keeper of the Archives, played an important role in recording many of the medieval structures lost to development in the city in the 1950s and 1960s.	1300647	Oriel College, south range, St Mary's Quadrangle (former St Mary Hall)
Oriel College, west range, St Mary's Quadrangle (former St Mary Hall)	Oriel College	College quadrangle	Before 1326, rebuilt c. 1446 and c. 1825	12 January 1954	SP5160206203; 51°45′08″N 1°15′14″W	The west range also retains some medieval masonry but was largely rebuilt by Daniel Robertson in 1826 in a Gothic style.	1046661	Oriel College, west range, St Mary's Quadrangle (former St Mary Hall)
Pembroke College, north range including library and north wing, Old (Main) Quadrangle	Pembroke College	College quadrangle	1673 (gatehouse 1694)	12 January 1954	SP5133105976; 51°45′00″N 1°15′28″W	Pembroke College was founded in 1624, funded by the will of Thomas Tesdale, a wealthy maltster. The Old (Main) Quadrangle dates from 1626–1670, although it was re-faced in the 1830s and later. The north range includes the former master's lodgings which dates from 1695, and the refectory of Broadgates Hall, the medieval institution which formed the nucleus of the new college.	1046663	Pembroke College, north range including library and north wing, Old (Main) Quadrangle
Pembroke College, east range, Old (Main) Quadrangle	Pembroke College	College quadrangle	1626–70	12 January 1954	SP5135105956; 51°45′00″N 1°15′27″W	The east range follows the 17th-century style of the quad, with two storeys and dormer windows set into the roofline.	1046664	Pembroke College, east range, Old (Main) Quadrangle
Pembroke College, chapel, south range, Old (Main) Quadrangle	Pembroke College	College chapel	1626	12 January 1954	SP5131805951; 51°45′00″N 1°15′29″W	The south range dates from 1626, but was extended in 1728 to the western end to include a chapel. The designer was William Townesend. The chapel was redesigned internally in the 1880s by Charles Eamer Kempe, a former student of the college.	1369653	Pembroke College, chapel, south range, Old (Main) Quadrangle
Pembroke College, west range, Old (Main) Quadrangle	Pembroke College	College quadrangle	1624	12 January 1954	SP5131405965; 51°45′00″N 1°15′29″W	The west range again dates from the 1620s, with refacing in the 1820s.	1200662	Pembroke College, west range, Old (Main) Quadrangle
The Queen's College, north range, Front Quadrangle including hall and chapel	The Queen's College	College quadrangle	1719	12 January 1954	SP5180506329; 51°45′12″N 1°15′03″W	Although founded in 1341, the buildings of The Queen's College are almost entirely of the late 17th and 18th centuries, following a building campaign from 1671–1779 which obliterated all traces of the medieval foundation, and provided instead a sequence of grand English Baroque and neoclassical structures. Both Sir Christopher Wren and Nicholas Hawksmoor were involved, although their exact contributions are sometimes unclear. The north range, with the college hall to the left and the chapel to the right, has its origins in a design by Hawksmoor but there is evidence to suggest that this design was modified by Dr. George Clarke, of All Souls, and by William Townesend.	1046674	The Queen's College, north range, Front Quadrangle including hall and chapel More images
The Queen's College, east range, Front Quadrangle	The Queen's College	College quadrangle	1735–1760	12 January 1954	SP5182406298; 51°45′11″N 1°15′02″W	The east and west ranges are both of thirteen bays and two storeys, standing on arcades which mirror the severity of the south frontage. The east range was built in two stages, in 1733 and 1759. The surrounding arcades are rusticated.	1046675	The Queen's College, east range, Front Quadrangle
The Queen's College, west range, Front Quadrangle	The Queen's College	College quadrangle	1709–11	12 January 1954	SP5177006310; 51°45′11″N 1°15′05″W	The west range dates from 1710.	1046673	The Queen's College, west range, Front Quadrangle More images
The Queen's College, south range, Front Quadrangle	The Queen's College	College quadrangle	1735	12 January 1954	SP5179606279; 51°45′10″N 1°15′04″W	The south range dates from 1734 and forms a screen fronting onto High Street. In the centre, above the gatehouse entrance, is a statue of Caroline of Ansbach, wife of George II and benefactor of the college.	1183496	The Queen's College, south range, Front Quadrangle
The Queen's College, north range, Back (North) Quadrangle	The Queen's College	College quadrangle	1707	12 January 1954	SP5180206376; 51°45′13″N 1°15′03″W	The Back (North) Quadrangle is among the earliest elements of the college rebuilding and displays evidence of the involvement of Christopher Wren in the late 17th century. It was much enlarged in the 18th. The north range dates from 1706.	1369657	The Queen's College, north range, Back (North) Quadrangle
The Queen's College, east range, Back (North) Quadrangle	The Queen's College	College quadrangle	1672–1721	12 January 1954	SP5182606358; 51°45′13″N 1°15′02″W	The east range is of 1719. It incorporates the earlier Williamson Building, named after Sir Joseph Williamson, along with Wren a founder member of the Royal Society and an early benefactor in the rebuilding of the college.	1183514	The Queen's College, east range, Back (North) Quadrangle
The Queen's College library (west range, Back (North) Quadrangle)	The Queen's College	College library	1692–94	12 January 1954	SP5177406359; 51°45′13″N 1°15′05″W	The west range dates from 1692, and is an independent structure unconnected to the other buildings in the quad. It contains the college library, considered among the best English examples of the Baroque and Rococo styles. John Julius Norwich considered it "astonishing" while Simon Bradley describes it as "gorgeous [and] exquisite".	1046636	The Queen's College library (west range, Back (North) Quadrangle)
The Queen's College, south range, Back (North) Quadrangle	The Queen's College	College quadrangle	1707–21	12 January 1954	SP5179806341; 51°45′12″N 1°15′04″W	The south range dates from 1715 to 1721.	1369678	The Queen's College, south range, Back (North) Quadrangle
St Catherine's College, podium and all buildings upon it	St Catherine's College	College accommodation	1961–66	30 March 1993	SP5225806640; 51°45′22″N 1°14′40″W	The collection of buildings at St Catherine's were described by Nikolaus Pevsner as "a perfect piece of architecture". The complex has been described as "among the best Modern architecture in Britain". Initiated by the college's first master, Alan Bullock, the design was undertaken by the Danish architect Arne Jacobsen. Among the most recent 20th-century buildings to be given Grade I listed status, in 1993, its grounds were also designated Grade I in 2020. In the 21st century, the buildings have been seriously affected by reinforced autoclaved aerated concrete (RAAC) and a large-scale renovation programme is in progress as at 2026.	1229934	St Catherine's College, podium and all buildings upon it
St Catherine's College, bicycle store	St Catherine's College	Bicycle store	1961–66	30 March 1993	SP5217406729; 51°45′25″N 1°14′44″W	One of some fifteen bike sheds in England listed by Historic England, Arne Jacobsen's design at St Catherine's is the only one to hold the highest, Grade I, designation.	1229973	St Catherine's College, bicycle store More images
St Catherine's College, gymnasium	St Catherine's College	Gymnasium	1961–66	30 March 1993	SP5230406505; 51°45′17″N 1°14′37″W	The gymnasium is a square block constructed in Arne Jacobsen's specially-commissioned yellow brick. It comprises two squash courts and a gym.	1369495	St Catherine's College, gymnasium
St Catherine's College, master's house and garden wall to north	St Catherine's College	College accommodation	1961–66	30 March 1993	SP5219506696; 51°45′24″N 1°14′43″W	Pevsner, while highly admiring of Jacobsen's work at the college, considered his entrance to St Catherine's to be "distressingly unmonumental". He thought the master's house "a glorified porter's lodge". The building was originally clad in wood which was replaced in renovations of 2004–5.	1278800	St Catherine's College, master's house and garden wall to north
St Catherine's College, music house	St Catherine's College	College music room	1961–66	30 March 1993	SP5219606568; 51°45′19″N 1°14′43″W	The music room, to the right of the image, was built to a complex double-hexagon design.	1047052	St Catherine's College, music house
St Catherine's College, wall 2m west of the music house	St Catherine's College	Wall	1961–66	30 March 1993	SP5220306589; 51°45′20″N 1°14′42″W	A stretch of wall, to the left of the image, runs from the detached music room to a bridge south of the college lecture rooms.	1047051	St Catherine's College, wall 2m west of the music house
St Edmund Hall, north range	St Edmund Hall	College quadrangle	16th century	12 January 1954	SP5186606319; 51°45′11″N 1°15′00″W	Among the oldest institutions at the university, St Edmund Hall descends from the medieval academic halls. The north range of the Front Quad is the earliest remaining part of the Hall, dating from the late 16th century. Built of rubble stone, it has been subject to much reconstruction.	1046642	St Edmund Hall, north range
St Edmund Hall, east range including old library and chapel	St Edmund Hall	College quadrangle	1682	12 January 1954	SP5189206308; 51°45′11″N 1°14′59″W	Pevsner considered the east range as "the one old building of St Edmund Hall with pretensions". Designed by William Byrd, the range was constructed in the 1680s. The upper storey contains the old library.	1183564	St Edmund Hall, east range including old library and chapel
St Edmund Hall, west range	St Edmund Hall	College quadrangle	1659	12 January 1954	SP5184506303; 51°45′11″N 1°15′01″W	The west range of Front Quad gives the hall its frontage onto Queen's Lane and dates from the mid-17th century. It was extended and reconfigured in the 19th and 20th centuries.	1369683	St Edmund Hall, west range
St Edmund Hall, library, former Church of St Peter-in-the-East	St Edmund Hall	College library	1150, rebuilt 1970–71	12 January 1954	SP5185706365; 51°45′13″N 1°15′01″W	The hall's new library is located in the redundant church of St Peter-the-East, described as "the most interesting church from the Middle Ages in Oxford". It was converted to the hall's library in 1968–1970.	1046644	St Edmund Hall, library, former Church of St Peter-in-the-East More images
St John's College, north range including chapel and hall	St John's College	College quadrangle	15th century	12 January 1954	SP5126006664; 51°45′23″N 1°15′32″W	A Tudor foundation by Sir Thomas White in 1555, the site's origins are earlier, in St Bernard's College established in 1437. It is these earlier buildings which form St John's Front Quad, of which the north range incorporates the college's chapel and hall.	1046649	St John's College, north range including chapel and hall More images
St John's College, east range	St John's College	College quadrangle	16th century	12 January 1954	SP5128506644; 51°45′22″N 1°15′30″W	The east range was completed by Sir Thomas White in 1555, having been left roofless and unfinished by the monks who established St Bernard's College.	1183649	St John's College, east range More images
St John's College, south range	St John's College	College quadrangle	1439	12 January 1954	SP5126906619; 51°45′21″N 1°15′31″W	The south range dates from 1438. Of two storeys, like the other ranges in Front Quad, it was crenallated in the mid-17th century.	1046648	St John's College, south range More images
St John's College, west range	St John's College	College quadrangle	1579	12 January 1954	SP5124306635; 51°45′22″N 1°15′32″W	The west range of Front Quad incorporates a gatehouse, of the 1470s and was reconstructed in the 1880s. A niche holds a medieval statue of Saint Bernard, to whom the original college was dedicated. A corresponding statue of Saint John on the inner wall of the tower was designed by Eric Gill and donated by Edward Maufe.	1046647	St John's College, west range More images
St John's College, Canterbury Quadrangle	St John's College	College quadrangle	1631–66	12 January 1954	SP5133206648; 51°45′22″N 1°15′28″W	Canterbury Quad is described in Pevsner as "by far the most impressive building of its date in Oxford". The dates were 1631–1635 and the builder was William Laud, Charles I's Archbishop of Canterbury and president of St John's from 1611 to 1621. Entrance and exit are made through two Renaissance gateways, with statues honouring Charles and his queen, Henrietta Maria by Hubert Le Sueur. (Note: William Laud's architect is uncertain; both Nicholas Stone, master-mason to Charles I, and Balthazar Gerbier, a courtier, diplomat and amateur architect engaged for various purposes by Charles, have been suggested.)	1183654	St John's College, Canterbury Quadrangle More images
St John's College, Cook's Building	St John's College	College kitchen	1555	12 January 1954	SP5123906674; 51°45′23″N 1°15′33″W	Cook's Building, in the north quadrangle, was the college's former kitchen and dates from Thomas White's time, c. 1555, although it was rebuilt a century later.	1300458	St John's College, Cook's Building More images
St John's College, Holmes Building	St John's College	College accommodation	1555	12 January 1954	SP5130406607; 51°45′21″N 1°15′29″W	The Holmes Building facade dates from 1794–1795 and was designed by James Pears. It stands to south of the old library.	1046650	St John's College, Holmes Building
St John's College, senior common room	St John's College	College common room	1676	12 January 1954	SP5127106685; 51°45′23″N 1°15′31″W	The senior common room, on the east side of north quad, dates from 1673, with rebuilding in two phases at the beginning and the end of the 19th century.	1046653	St John's College, senior common room
Trinity College, Durham Quad, north range (also forms Garden Quad, south range)	Trinity College	College quadrangle	1728	12 January 1954	SP5136606570; 51°45′20″N 1°15′26″W	Trinity College was preceded by Durham Hall, later Durham College, a monastic institution founded in 1286 for the monks of Durham Cathedral. Dissolved at the Reformation, it was re-founded in 1555 as Trinity College by Sir Thomas Pope. Durham Quadrangle includes elements of the monastic foundation but the north range is largely a reconstruction by William Townesend in 1728.	1046624	Trinity College, Durham Quad, north range (also forms Garden Quad, south range)
Trinity College, Durham Quad, east range (old library and old president's lodging)	Trinity College	College quadrangle	1421, remodelled 1687	12 January 1954	SP5138606565; 51°45′20″N 1°15′25″W	The east range of Durham Quadrangle contains much of the original structure, dates from 1421 and includes the old library and the former president's lodge. The library has some important 15th-century stained glass.	1183812	Trinity College, Durham Quad, east range (old library and old president's lodging)
Trinity College, Durham Quad, south range	Trinity College	College quadrangle	1694	12 January 1954	SP5138106541; 51°45′19″N 1°15′25″W	The south range contains a gatehouse and the college chapel, both dating from the presidency of Ralph Bathurst. Bathurst's architect has been the subject of debate; Christopher Wren, Nicholas Hawksmoor and Bathurst acting himself have been suggested. Pevsner considers Dean Aldrich the most plausible candidate. The chapel, the first in Oxford to abandon Gothic forms in favour of the English Baroque, underwent a major renovation in the early 21st century.	1183850	Trinity College, Durham Quad, south range More images
Trinity College, Durham Quad, west range	Trinity College	College quadrangle	1620	12 January 1954	SP5135506536; 51°45′19″N 1°15′27″W	The west range of the quad contains the college hall, of the 1620s replacing the medieval original. It has been much remodelled since.	1046623	Trinity College, Durham Quad, west range
Trinity College, kitchen (on north-west)	Trinity College	College kitchen	1676–77	12 January 1954	SP5134106552; 51°45′19″N 1°15′27″W	The kitchen on the north-west corner of the quad is a late-17th-century reconstruction, which has been subject to a great deal of later rebuilding. The kitchen is centre-left in the image.	1369674	Trinity College, kitchen (on north-west)
Trinity College, Garden Quad, north range	Trinity College	College quadrangle	1668, remodelled 1802	12 January 1954	SP5134906600; 51°45′21″N 1°15′27″W	The Garden Quad was begun by Sir Christopher Wren, a friend of President Bathurst, and the north range includes much of his design, although it has been reconstructed.	1046625	Trinity College, Garden Quad, north range
Trinity College, Garden Quad, west range	Trinity College	College quadrangle	1668, remodelled 1802	12 January 1954	SP5133606584; 51°45′20″N 1°15′28″W	The west range of the Garden Quad dates from 1682 and, with the south range of 1728, completed Wren's intended three-range quad.	1046626	Trinity College, Garden Quad, west range More images
University College, gatehouse, Front Quadrangle, north range	University College	Gatehouse	1635–36	12 January 1954	SP5173206253; 51°45′09″N 1°15′07″W	Discussion over the foundation date of University College has continued for centuries, but it is generally accepted as the university's oldest college, established in 1249 through a bequest in the will of William of Durham. Nothing of the medieval buildings now remains, the major quadrangles, Front and Radcliffe, dating from the 17th and 18th centuries respectively. The north range of the Front Quadrangle faces High Street and contains the gatehouse dating from the 1630s. (Note: A pasteboard architectural model for the Front Quad dating from this time is the oldest surviving such model in England.)	1369675	University College, gatehouse, Front Quadrangle, north range More images
University College, Front Quadrangle, east range	University College	College quadrangle	1677	12 January 1954	SP5175206235; 51°45′09″N 1°15′06″W	The construction of Front Quad was protracted, interrupted by the English Civil War. The east range was completed in 1676, some forty years after the north range. The east range is to the right of the image.	1184113	University College, Front Quadrangle, east range
University College, Front Quadrangle, south range including chapel, hall and kitchen	University College	College quadrangle	1688–90	12 January 1954	SP5173206203; 51°45′08″N 1°15′07″W	The south range of the Front Quad was also in development for some time; begun in the late 1630s, the chapel and hall were not completed until 1671.	1046632	University College, Front Quadrangle, south range including chapel, hall and kitchen
University College, Front Quadrangle, west range	University College	College quadrangle	1634	12 January 1954	SP5171406234; 51°45′09″N 1°15′08″W	The west range of the Front Quad is contemporary with the north, completed in the 1630s.	1300275	University College, Front Quadrangle, west range
University College, Radcliffe Quadrangle	University College	College quadrangle	1716–19	12 January 1954	SP5177206252; 51°45′09″N 1°15′05″W	The Radcliffe Quadrangle, funded by a bequest from John Radcliffe, was constructed between 1716–1719. It deliberately follows the architectural style of the Front Quad of ninety years before, creating a harmonious and lenghty frontage onto The High.	1046635	University College, Radcliffe Quadrangle More images
Wadham College, Main Quadrangle including chapel, hall, kitchen, library and cloister	Wadham College	College quadrangle	1610–13	12 January 1954	SP5159006623; 51°45′21″N 1°15′14″W	Wadham College was founded in 1610 by Dorothy Wadham, a wealthy widow and heiress in her own right. Her chosen architect was William Arnold, a master-mason, described by Dorothy as "an honest man, a perfectt workman and my neere neighboure". The Front Quadrangle was completed quickly, between 1610–1613, and thus has a stylistic unity which has been largely unaltered since.	1369701	Wadham College, Main Quadrangle including chapel, hall, kitchen, library and cloister More images
Worcester College, north range	Worcester College	College quadrangle	1773–76	12 January 1954	SP5090506525; 51°45′18″N 1°15′50″W	The origins of Worcester College are in Gloucester Hall, later Gloucester College, a medieval monastic foundation. Dissolved at the English Reformation, it was refounded in 1714 through a bequest from Sir Thomas Cookes, a Worcestershire landowner.The designer was George Clarke, with input from Nicholas Hawksmoor. Their plan was for two three-range quads but progress was frequently interrupted and by the 19th century much of the medieval fabric remained. The north range was undertaken in the 1750s.	1046605	Worcester College, north range
Worcester College, south range with Pump Quadrangle and old kitchen	Worcester College	College quadrangle	15th century	12 January 1954	SP5092006474; 51°45′17″N 1°15′49″W	The south range of Main Quad retains much of the medieval structures, including the original kitchens and pump room.	1046604	Worcester College, south range with Pump Quadrangle and old kitchen
Worcester College, main block	Worcester College	College accommodation	1786	12 January 1954	SP5094006489; 51°45′17″N 1°15′48″W	The main block of the college faces Beaumont Street, and comprises a central block with two projecting wings. The centre contains the library, the western block the college hall, the eastern the chapel. Both of the latter were decorated by James Wyatt in the late 18th century. In the mid-19th, Wyatt's designs were completely overdone by William Burges. In turn, Burges's work in the hall was eradicated in the mid-20th century, with its decoration being returned to an 18th-century style.	1184311	Worcester College, main block More images
Worcester College, entrance screen and gates on Beaumont Street	Worcester College	Gate	Uncertain, possibly 18th, 19th or 20th centuries	28 June 1972	SP5095206504; 51°45′18″N 1°15′48″W	The dating of the railings and screen enclosing the small courtyard facing Beaumont Street is uncertain. The Historic England listing record gives no date, a heritage assessment of 2012 dates them to the 1870s, while Pevsner suggests that they are a mid-20th-century copy of an 18th-century design.	1184324	Worcester College, entrance screen and gates on Beaumont Street More images
Worcester College, gateway on Walton Street to the north of the north range	Worcester College	Gate	15th century	12 January 1954	SP5095006533; 51°45′19″N 1°15′48″W	The gateway on Walton Street is a fragment of the medieval remains of Gloucester College and carries armorial bearings.	1046608	Worcester College, gateway on Walton Street to the north of the north range

== Major university sites ==
Grade I listed buildings in Oxford – major university sites
Name	Location	Type	Completed	Date designated	Grid ref. Geo-coordinates	Notes	Entry number	Image
Ashmolean Museum and Taylor Institution	Oxford	Museum	1841–45	12 January 1954	SP5113106548; 51°45′19″N 1°15′38″W	By Charles Robert Cockerell, the former a museum and art gallery, the latter an institute for the study of languages, established with a gift from Sir Robert Taylor.	1047111	Ashmolean Museum and Taylor Institution More images
Ashmolean Museum and Taylorian, entrance screen and steps fronting Beaumont Street	Oxford	Gate	c. 1845	28 June 1972	SP5117406538; 51°45′19″N 1°15′36″W	Part of Cockerell's original design, the steps are of Portland stone and the gates are of cast-iron.	1047112	Ashmolean Museum and Taylorian, entrance screen and steps fronting Beaumont Street
History of Science Museum (Old Ashmolean Building), screen wall and piers fronting Broad Street	Oxford	Gate	1860	28 June 1972	SP5148806450; 51°45′16″N 1°15′20″W	Built to house the collection of curiosities amassed by Elias Ashmole, originally assembled by John Tradescant the Younger. The architect is not definitively recorded but is likely to have been Thomas Wood. The stone carving is certainly by William Bird. The listing relates to the frontage screen, built in the 1860s with carvings of heads of the Caesars in continuation of the Sheldonian screen.	1299669	History of Science Museum (Old Ashmolean Building), screen wall and piers fronting Broad Street
Bodleian Library and Schools Quadrangle including the Divinity School and the Convocation House	The Schools	University office	1424–1490, with much later rebuilding and reconstruction	12 January 1954	SP5155006415; 51°45′15″N 1°15′17″W	Founded by Thomas Bodley in 1602, and with earlier origins in Duke Humfrey's Library, the Bodleian is the second-largest, and among the oldest, in Britain. A legal deposit library, it receives copies of all works published in the United Kingdom and the Republic of Ireland.	1047185	Bodleian Library and Schools Quadrangle including the Divinity School and the Convocation House More images
Clarendon Building (now administered by the Bodleian Library)	Bodleian Library	University office	1711–13	12 January 1954	SP5155106474; 51°45′17″N 1°15′16″W	The Clarendon Building was designed as the office of the Clarendon Press, predecessors of the OUP, and was funded by the profits from Edward Hyde, 1st Earl of Clarendon's History of the Great Rebellion. A "grave and pretentious" building it was designed by Nicholas Hawksmoor.	1185456	Clarendon Building (now administered by the Bodleian Library) More images
Screen between Clarendon Building and Bodleian Library fronting Catte Street	Oxford	Gate	Early 18th century	28 June 1972	SP5157806461; 51°45′16″N 1°15′15″W	The screen, which fronts onto Catte Street and separates the Clarendon Building from the Bodleian Library, dates from the 18th century. It consists of ashlar gate piers and gates and railings fashioned from wrought iron.	1047148	Screen between Clarendon Building and Bodleian Library fronting Catte Street
Radcliffe Camera	Oxford	Library	1737–49	12 January 1954	SP5159106345; 51°45′12″N 1°15′14″W	Funded from the will of John Radcliffe, a doctor, to house a science library, the camera was built to the designs of James Gibbs. It now acts as a reading room to the Bodleian Library and houses the library of the history faculty.	1099146	Radcliffe Camera More images
Radcliffe Observatory	Green Templeton College	Observatory	1772–76	12 January 1954	SP5090407163; 51°45′39″N 1°15′50″W	Another result of the philanthropy of John Radcliffe, who also funded the Camera and the Radcliffe Infirmary. Begun to the design of Henry Keene, who completed the adjacent Observer's House, it was completed by James Wyatt, after Keene's death and to a different design. Pevsner and Sherwood consider it, "the architecturally finest observatory in Europe". No longer in use as an observatory, the building forms part of the estate of Green Templeton College.	1047070	Radcliffe Observatory More images
Observer's House	Green Templeton College	House	Late 18th century	12 January 1954	SP5094707170; 51°45′39″N 1°15′48″W	Built to the design of Henry Keene as accommodation for the director of the Radcliffe Observatory. As at 2025, it provides student accommodation.	1369464	Observer's House
Sheldonian Theatre	Oxford	Theatre	1664–69	12 January 1954	SP5152106443; 51°45′16″N 1°15′18″W	Sir Christopher Wren's first work, of the 1660s, funded by a gift of over £12,000 from Gilbert Sheldon, warden of All Souls and later Archbishop of Canterbury. Wren's inspiration was Sebastiano Serlio's illustration of the Theatre of Marcellus in Rome. The theatre was built to hold major university ceremonies, until then held at the University Church of St Mary the Virgin.	1047350	Sheldonian Theatre More images
Sheldonian Theatre walling, railings and ornamental piers fronting Broad Street	Oxford	Gate	1664–69	28 June 1972	SP5151606468; 51°45′16″N 1°15′18″W	The railings with their heads of the Caesars were restored in the 1860s. A further restoration and re-carving of the heads took place in the 1970s. Pevsner and Sherwood recorded their regret: "renewed they would be of no value, now they have picturesque value".	1369353	Sheldonian Theatre walling, railings and ornamental piers fronting Broad Street More images
University of Oxford Botanic Garden, Main (or Danby) Gateway in the Centre with Its flanking wall and two doorways	Christ Church Meadow	Gate	1632	12 January 1954	SP5205606121; 51°45′05″N 1°14′50″W	The Botanic Garden was founded by Henry Danvers, 1st Earl of Danby in 1631. He gifted a benefice in Yorkshire as an endowment. This, the first and most important, is one of three gates designed by Nicholas Stone. Pevsner suggests it draws heavily on illustrations from Sebastiano Serlio's Extraordinary Book of Doors (Arches).	1320345	University of Oxford Botanic Garden, Main (or Danby) Gateway in the Centre with Its flanking wall and two doorways More images
University of Oxford Botanic Garden, library and herbarium	Christ Church Meadow	Library	c. 1835	12 January 1954	SP5208506105; 51°45′04″N 1°14′49″W	The library and herbarium were designed by William Townesend, a prominent Oxford sculptor and architect, and date from the 1730s.	1320377	University of Oxford Botanic Garden, library and herbarium
University of Oxford Botanic Garden, garden wall and east and west gateways	Christ Church Meadow	Wall and gates	17th–18th centuries	12 January 1954	SP5197906104; 51°45′04″N 1°14′54″W	The east and West gates and their attached walls were designed by Nicholas Stone, and have heavy rustication.	1369362	University of Oxford Botanic Garden, garden wall and east and west gateways
University of Oxford Botanic Garden, wall between the main gate and Magdalen College bursary	Christ Church Meadow	Wall	18th century	28 June 1972	SP5206706114; 51°45′05″N 1°14′50″W	Historic England records that the wall was listed for its group value as part of the botanical walled gardens.	1047284	University of Oxford Botanic Garden, wall between the main gate and Magdalen College bursary
University of Oxford Botanic Garden, wall to east of Magdalen College bursary	Christ Church Meadow	Wall	18th century	28 June 1972	SP5209906097; 51°45′04″N 1°14′48″W	Historic England records that the wall was listed for its group value as part of the botanical walled gardens.	1369361	University of Oxford Botanic Garden, wall to east of Magdalen College bursary
Oxford University Museum of Natural History and Pitt Rivers Museum	Oxford	Museum	1860–1886	12 January 1954	SP5148306927; 51°45′31″N 1°15′20″W	The Museum of Natural History and the Pitt Rivers Museum were both designed by Thomas Newenham Deane, in partnership with Benjamin Woodward, and were heavily influenced by John Ruskin, who was himself closely involved in the design.	1081534	Oxford University Museum of Natural History and Pitt Rivers Museum More images

== City churches ==
Grade I listed buildings in Oxford – city churches
Name	Location	Type	Completed	Date designated	Grid ref. Geo-coordinates	Notes	Entry number	Image
Church of St Barnabas	Oxford	Church	1868–69	29 January 1968	SP5050206842; 51°45′29″N 1°16′11″W	Designed by Sir Arthur Blomfield, St Barnabas remains an active parish church in the Church of England.	1299646	Church of St Barnabas More images
St Bartholomew's Chapel	Oxford	Chapel	1100–35	12 January 1954	SP5347505471; 51°44′43″N 1°13′37″W	Also known as Bartlemas Chapel, it remains an active church in the Church of England with occasional services.	1299349	St Bartholomew's Chapel More images
Church of St Cross	Oxford	Church	11th–12th century	12 January 1954	SP5201406657; 51°45′22″N 1°14′52″W	The Church of St Cross was closed in 2008. It now operates as Balliol College's Historic Collections centre under a 999-year lease.	1369450	Church of St Cross More images
Church of St Giles	Oxford	Church	12th century	12 January 1954	SP5113906982; 51°45′33″N 1°15′38″W	First mentioned in 1138 but the tower, begun at the end of the 12th century, was not completed until the 13th. The church was restored in 1920.	1047140	Church of St Giles More images
Church of St John the Evangelist	Oxford	Church	1896	29 January 1968	SP5256705584; 51°44′47″N 1°14′24″W	The church was designed by George Frederick Bodley, with stained glass by Charles Eamer Kempe.	1104879	Church of St John the Evangelist More images
Church of St Margaret	Binsey	Church	12th century	12 January 1954	SP4856608060; 51°46′09″N 1°17′51″W	St Margaret's is a "small and rustic" parish church dedicated to St Margaret, with a Holy well in the churchyard that is associated with the legend of St Frideswide.	1047335	Church of St Margaret More images
Church of St Mary the Virgin	Iffley	Church	1175–82	12 January 1954	SP5271403456; 51°43′38″N 1°14′17″W	St Mary's is described in Pevsner as "magnificent [...] one of the best-preserved 12th-century village churches in England". It is elaborately decorated internally, with much original stone carving.	1047319	Church of St Mary the Virgin More images
Church of St Mary Magdalen	Oxford	Church	Late 13th century	12 January 1954	SP5125806471; 51°45′17″N 1°15′32″W	Nikolaus Pevsner described the exterior of St Mary Magdalen as "confusing" and the interior as "confused", the latter in part attributable to the 1840s restoration by George Gilbert Scott and William Bonython Moffatt. He nevertheless considered their work important, as the first "archaeologically respectful" instance of Gothic Revival architecture in Oxford.	1047218	Church of St Mary Magdalen More images
Church of St Mary the Virgin	Oxford	Church	c. 1320	12 January 1954	SP5161006274; 51°45′10″N 1°15′14″W	St Mary the Virgin is considered as Oxford's "parish church", and was the site of university ceremonies before the completion of the Sheldonian Theatre. Sir George Gilbert Scott undertook restoration in the mid-19th century.	1047275	Church of St Mary the Virgin More images
Church of St Michael at the North Gate	Oxford	Church	Early–mid-11th century	12 January 1954	SP5128906375; 51°45′13″N 1°15′30″W	Pevsner dates the tower of the church to around 1050. George Edmund Street undertook restoration in 1853, but this, and much else, was largely lost in a major fire in 1953.	1185714	Church of St Michael at the North Gate More images
Church of St Nicholas	Marston	Church	13th century	18 July 1963	SP5272308881; 51°46′34″N 1°14′14″W	Described in Pevsner as "Late Perpendicular Gothic", St Nicholas's remains an active parish church.	1181921	Church of St Nicholas More images
Oxford Centre for Mission Studies (formerly the Church of St Philip and St James)	Oxford	Church	1862	29 January 1968	SP5089007557; 51°45′52″N 1°15′50″W	The church was designed by the prolific Victorian church architect, George Edmund Street. Closed as a church in the 1970s, it now houses the Oxford Centre for Mission Studies.	1047073	Oxford Centre for Mission Studies (formerly the Church of St Philip and St James) More images

== Castle and other sites ==
Grade I listed buildings in Oxford – castle and other sites
Name	Location	Type	Completed	Date designated	Grid ref. Geo-coordinates	Notes	Entry number	Image
Oxford Castle, St George's Tower, St Georges Chapel crypt and D Wing including the Debtors Tower	Oxford	Castle	1071	12 January 1954	SP5095406139; 51°45′06″N 1°15′48″W	The present castle was founded by the Norman Robert D'Oyly in the early 1070s, although some archaeologists suggest St George's Tower pre-dates the castle and may have formed part of the Saxon defences. The castle was the main site of the Siege of Oxford (1142), when the Empress Matilda escaped from her nephew Stephen's encircling forces. Slighted after the second Siege of Oxford during the English Civil War, the site was then converted to a prison, which operated as HMP Oxford until 1996. The site has now been developed as an historic museum and a hotel.	1369490	Oxford Castle, St George's Tower, St Georges Chapel crypt and D Wing including the Debtors Tower More images
Oxford Castle well house	Oxford	Castle	1071	12 January 1954	SP5096706199; 51°45′08″N 1°15′47″W	The well chamber is sited within the mound of the motte-and-bailey castle. It is hexagonal in shape, with rib vaulting.	1369493	Oxford Castle well house More images
Golden Cross Hotel	Oxford	Public house	15th century	12 January 1954	SP5127406223; 51°45′08″N 1°15′31″W	The Golden Cross began as a late-15th-century coaching inn. It now forms part of a new shopping arcade developed in the 1980s. The hotel is to the left of the image.	1047323	Golden Cross Hotel More images
Old Palace, (Bishop King's Palace)	Nos. 86 & 87 St Aldate's	House	16th–17th century, with earlier origins	12 January 1954	SP5139905861; 51°44′57″N 1°15′25″W	Also known as Bishop King's Palace, after Robert King, first Bishop of Oxford, the old palace consists of two wings of 1485 and 1622. As at 2025, it housed the headquarters of the Oxford University Catholic Chaplaincy.	1369422	Old Palace, (Bishop King's Palace) More images
No. 126 The High	High Street	Shop and house	15th century, with a late 17th century frontage	12 January 1954	SP5144006193; 51°45′07″N 1°15′22″W	No. 126 is a rare survival of a medieval timber-framed shop-house with some remnants of 16th-century wall paintings.	1047260	No. 126 The High

== City walls ==
Grade I listed buildings in Oxford – city walls
Name	Location	Type	Completed	Date designated	Grid ref. Geo-coordinates	Notes	Entry number	Image
Bastion 1	City wall	Bastion	1226–1240	12 January 1954	SP5108106304; 51°45′11″N 1°15′41″W	Part of a defensive system undertaken between 1226 and 1240 to strengthen/replace earlier fortifications. The bastions are hollow semi-circles of rubble stone, some retaining their wall walks. Bastion 1 stands between Bulwark Lane and New Inn Hall Street.	1184380	Bastion 1 More images
Bastion 4	City wall	Bastion	1226–1240	12 January 1954	SP5132106397; 51°45′14″N 1°15′29″W	Bastion 4 stands at the rear of No. 2 Ship Street	1184408	Bastion 4
Bastion 11	City wall (New College)	Bastion	1226–1240	12 January 1954	SP5176406465; 51°45′16″N 1°15′05″W	Bastion 11 retains its wall walk, parapet and loopholes. It forms part of the collection of walling in the grounds of New College, which includes some of the wall's best-preserved and most intact sections.	1369705	Bastion 11
Bastion 12	City wall (New College)	Bastion	1226–1240	12 January 1954	SP5181906452; 51°45′16″N 1°15′03″W	"Largely standing and well preserved", Bastion 12 forms another element of the wall at New College. It was restored in the 18th century.	1046611	Bastion 12
Bastion 13	City wall (New College)	Bastion	1226–1240	12 January 1954	SP5187806449; 51°45′16″N 1°14′59″W	"Largely standing and well preserved", Bastion 13 is another part of the wall located in the grounds of New College.	1046612	Bastion 13
Bastion 14, on north-east angle of wall	City wall (New College)	Bastion	1226–1240	12 January 1954	SP5193806440; 51°45′15″N 1°14′56″W	"Largely standing and well preserved", Bastion 14 is another part of the wall located in the grounds of New College.	1184494	Bastion 14, on north-east angle of wall
Bastion 15	City wall (New College)	Bastion	1226–1240	12 January 1954	SP5193806374; 51°45′13″N 1°14′56″W	"Largely standing and well preserved", Bastion 15 is another part of the wall located in the grounds of New College.	1184504	Bastion 15
Bastion 16	City wall (St Edmund Hall/New College)	Bastion	1226–1240	12 January 1954	SP5194106306; 51°45′11″N 1°14′56″W	Bastion 16 stands in the grounds of St Edmund Hall.	1046614	Bastion 16
Bastion 20	City wall	Bastion	1226–1240	12 January 1954	SP5181706049; 51°45′03″N 1°15′03″W	Bastion 20, in the grounds of Christ Church, is much "altered". Historic England describes it as "patched and replaced".	1046578	Bastion 20 More images
Bastion 21	City wall (Corpus Christi College auditorium)	Bastion	1226–1240	12 January 1954	SP5159605977; 51°45′00″N 1°15′14″W	Bastion 21 stands south of the president's lodge in the grounds of Corpus Christi. It has been repaired and refaced in ashlar.	1046580	Bastion 21
Wall east of Bastion 12	City wall (New College)	Wall	1226–1240	12 January 1954	SP5185006448; 51°45′16″N 1°15′01″W	"Largely standing and well preserved", the section of wall to the east of Bastion 12 is another element of walling in the grounds of New College.	1184468	Wall east of Bastion 12
Wall in Brewer Street, being the south wall of Pembroke College	City wall (Pembroke College)	Wall	1226–1240	12 January 1954	SP5131605948; 51°45′00″N 1°15′29″W	On Brewer Street, the wall forms the exterior garden wall of Pembroke College.	1046581	Wall in Brewer Street, being the south wall of Pembroke College
Wall south of Bastion 14	City wall (New College)	Wall	1226–1240	12 January 1954	SP5193506398; 51°45′14″N 1°14′56″W	A further section of wall standing in the gardens of New College.	1046613	Wall south of Bastion 14
Wall east of Bastion 11	City wall (New College)	Wall	1226–1240	12 January 1954	SP5179106455; 51°45′16″N 1°15′04″W	A further section of wall standing in the gardens of New College.	1184453	Wall east of Bastion 11
Wall east of Bell Tower	City wall (New College)	Wall	1226–1240	12 January 1954	SP5172606465; 51°45′16″N 1°15′07″W	A further section of wall located at New College.	1046610	Wall east of Bell Tower
Wall east of Bastion 13	City wall (New College)	Wall	1226–1240	12 January 1954	SP5190906439; 51°45′15″N 1°14′58″W	A further section of wall located in the gardens of New College.	1369706	Wall east of Bastion 13
Wall east of Bastion 20	City wall	Wall	1226–1240	12 January 1954	SP5185206060; 51°45′03″N 1°15′01″W	A section of wall east of Bastion 20 in the grounds of Christ Church, its base is medieval, the top sections are later.	1046615	Wall east of Bastion 20 More images
Wall east of Bastion 21	City wall (Corpus Christi College)	Wall	1226–1240	12 January 1954	SP5162905989; 51°45′01″N 1°15′13″W	A section of wall east of Bastion 21 in the grounds of Corpus Christi. It has been repaired and refaced in ashlar.	1046579	Wall east of Bastion 21
Wall east of Bastion 1	City wall	Wall	1226–1240	12 January 1954	SP5110206307; 51°45′11″N 1°15′40″W	A section of wall running east from Bastion 1 on New Inn Hall Street.	1369704	Wall east of Bastion 1
Wall west of Bastion I	City wall	Wall	1226–1240	28 June 1972	SP5105906281; 51°45′10″N 1°15′42″W	A section of wall running west from Bastion 1 on New Inn Hall Street.	1046609	Wall west of Bastion I
Wall forming the rear boundary of Nos. 8 to 10 Turn Again Lane	City wall	Wall	1226–1240	12 January 1954	SP5117905971; 51°45′00″N 1°15′36″W	This element forms a section of wall on Turn Again Lane.	1046583	Wall forming the rear boundary of Nos. 8 to 10 Turn Again Lane
Wall south of Bastion 15	City wall (New College)	Wall	1226–1240	12 January 1954	SP5193406344; 51°45′12″N 1°14′57″W	A further section of wall located in the gardens of New College.	1369707	Wall south of Bastion 15
Wall south of Bastion 16	City wall (St Edmund Hall)	Wall	1226–1240	12 January 1954	SP5193506298; 51°45′11″N 1°14′57″W	A section of wall south of Bastion 16 in the grounds of St Edmund Hall.	1300067	Wall south of Bastion 16
Wall south of summer house	City wall (Merton College)	Wall	1226–1240	12 January 1954	SP5189006091; 51°45′04″N 1°14′59″W	A wall which now forms part of the boundary wall of Merton College.	1369708	Wall south of summer house
Wall south side of St Helens Passage	City wall	Wall	1226–1240	12 January 1954	SP5162606479; 51°45′17″N 1°15′13″W	A section of wall that stands in St Helen's Passage, off Catte Street.	1300145	Wall south side of St Helens Passage
Wall west from Littlegate Street	City wall	Wall	1226–1240	28 June 1972	SP5125105952; 51°45′00″N 1°15′32″W	A section of wall standing on Littlegate Street.	1046582	Wall west from Littlegate Street
Wall west of Bastion 20	City wall	Wall	1226–1240	12 January 1954	SP5178806041; 51°45′02″N 1°15′04″W	A section of wall standing to the west of Bastion 20 in the grounds of Christ Church, it has been subject to considerable rebuilding.	1369731	Wall west of Bastion 20 More images

== See also ==
- Grade I listed buildings in Oxfordshire
- Grade II* listed buildings in Oxford
- Oxford city walls
- Buildings of Jesus College, Oxford
- History of Oxford
- University of Oxford

== Sources ==
- Bradley, Simon; Pevsner, Nikolaus; Sherwood, Jennifer (2023). Oxfordshire: Oxford and the South-East. The Buildings of England. New Haven, US and London: Yale University Press. ISBN 978-0-300-20929-7.
- Brockliss, Laurence W. B. (2016). The University of Oxford: A History. Oxford: Oxford University Press. ISBN 978-0-199-24356-3.
- Chance, Eleanor; Colvin, Christina; Cooper, Janet; Day, C. J.; Hassall, T. G.; Jessup, Mary; Selwyn, Nesta (1954). "The Radcliffe Camera". A History of the County of Oxford. Victoria County History. Vol. 3: The University of Oxford. London: Victoria County History. OCLC 220842953.
- Christ Church (2023). A brief history of Christ Church (PDF). Oxford: Christ Church.
- Clark, Kenneth (1962). The Gothic Revival: An Essay in the History of Taste. London: John Murray. ISBN 978-0-719-53102-6.
- Fowler, Thomas (1898). Corpus Christi. Oxford University College Histories. London: F. E. Robinson & Co.
- Haslam, Jeremy (2021). "The late tenth-century defences of Oxford and the towers of St George and St Michael". Archaeological Journal. 178 (2). Taylor & Francis: 252–279. doi:10.1080/00665983.2021.1886707.
- Highfield, J.R.L. (1974). "W. A. Pantin: in Memoriam" (PDF). Oxoniensia. XXXIX. Oxford: Oxfordshire Architectural and Historical Society: iv–v.
- Horsfield, Bill (2017). Strategic Stone Survey: A Building Stone Atlas of Oxfordshire (PDF). Swindon: English Heritage.
- Keenan, Anne (2012). Worcester College, Oxford: Landscape character analysis (PDF). Oxford: Annekeenan.co.
- Mordaunt Crook, J. (2008). Brasenose: The biography of an Oxford College. Oxford: Oxford University Press. ISBN 978-0-199-54486-8.
- Munby, Julian (1975). "126 High Street: The Archaeology and History of an Oxford House" (PDF). Oxoniensia. Oxfordshire Architectural and Historical Society: 254–308.
- Norwich, John Julius (1985). The Architecture of Southern England. London: Macmillan. ISBN 9780333220375. OCLC 473443897.
- Pantin, W. A.; Rouse, E. Clive (1955). "The Golden Cross, Oxford" (PDF). Oxoniensia. XX. Oxford Architectural & Historical Society: 46–89.
- Salter, H. E.; Lobel, Mary D. (1954). "Jesus College". A History of the County of Oxford. Victoria County History. Vol. 3: The University of Oxford. London: Victoria County History. OCLC 220842953.
- —; — (1954). "Merton College". A History of the County of Oxford. Victoria County History. Vol. 3: The University of Oxford. London: Victoria County History. OCLC 220842953.
- —; — (1954). "New College". A History of the County of Oxford. Victoria County History. Vol. 3: The University of Oxford. London: Victoria County History. OCLC 220842953.
- Sherwood, Jennifer; Pevsner, Nikolaus (2002). Oxfordshire. The Buildings of England. New Haven, US and London: Yale University Press. ISBN 978-0-300-09639-2.
- Young, Brian (2006). "Henry Aldrich". In Christopher Butler (ed.). Christ Church, Oxford: A portrait of the House. London: Third Millennium Publishing. ISBN 978-1-903-94246-8.
