= Hearties =

19th-century British slang term

Hearties was a term used for athletic students (particularly rowers) at the University of Oxford and elsewhere, especially in the 19th and early 20th century. The term is often used in contrast to the less athletic "aesthetes".

At Christ Church in Oxford there is an ornamental pond with a statue of Mercury in the centre of Tom Quad, the main quad in the college and the largest in Oxford. In the past, it was traditional for hearties to throw aesthetes into this pond as a practical joke.

In the novel Brideshead Revisited by Evelyn Waugh, Anthony Blanche was "debagged" by athletic hearties at Oxford.
