= William Townesend =

British sculptor, architect and builder

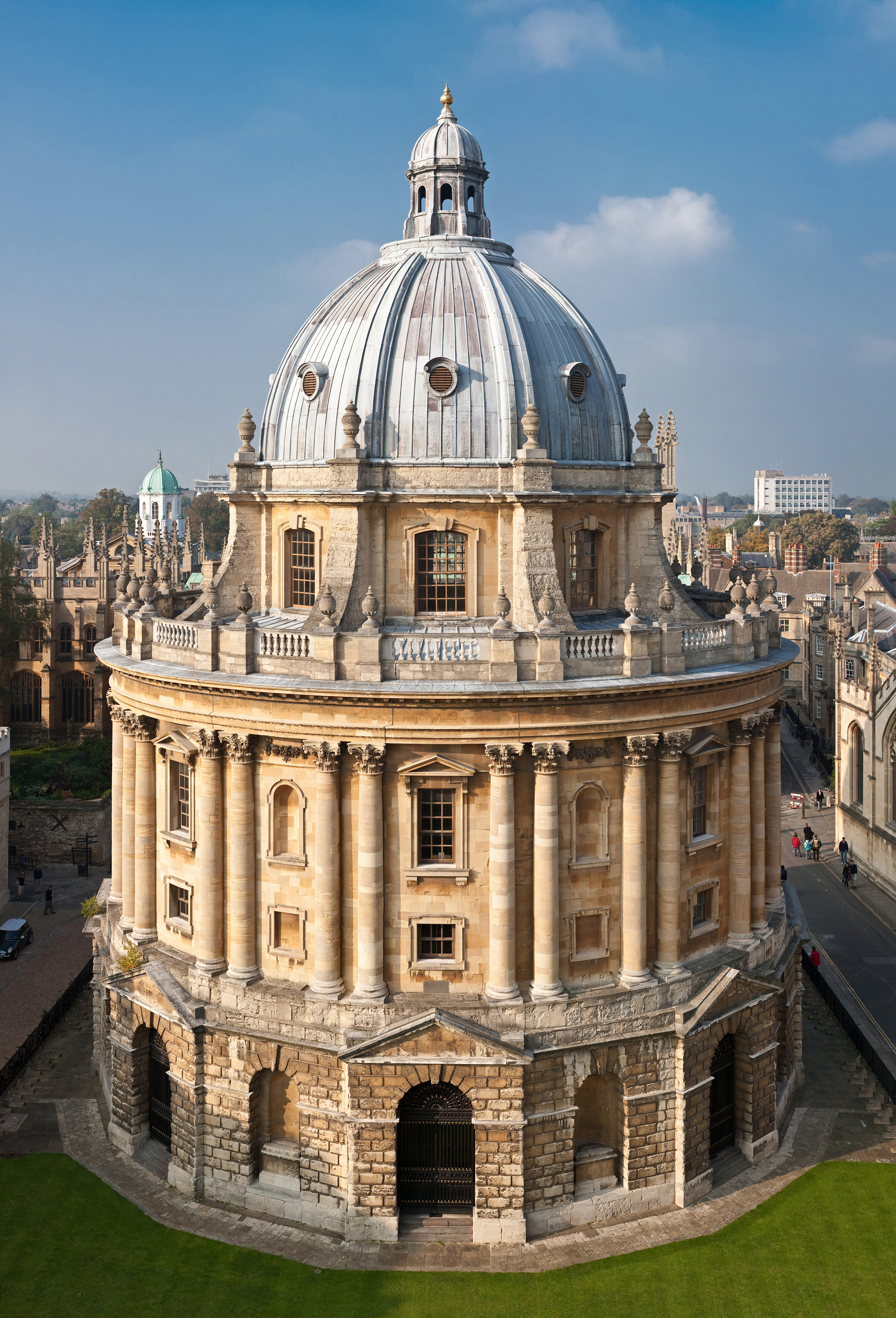
Radcliffe Library (Bodleian Library) in Oxford

William Townesend (1676–1739) was a prominent English sculptor, architect, and builder in 17th and 18th-century Oxford, associated with several important buildings.

His masterpiece is the Radcliffe Library in Oxford, completed by his son.

== Life ==
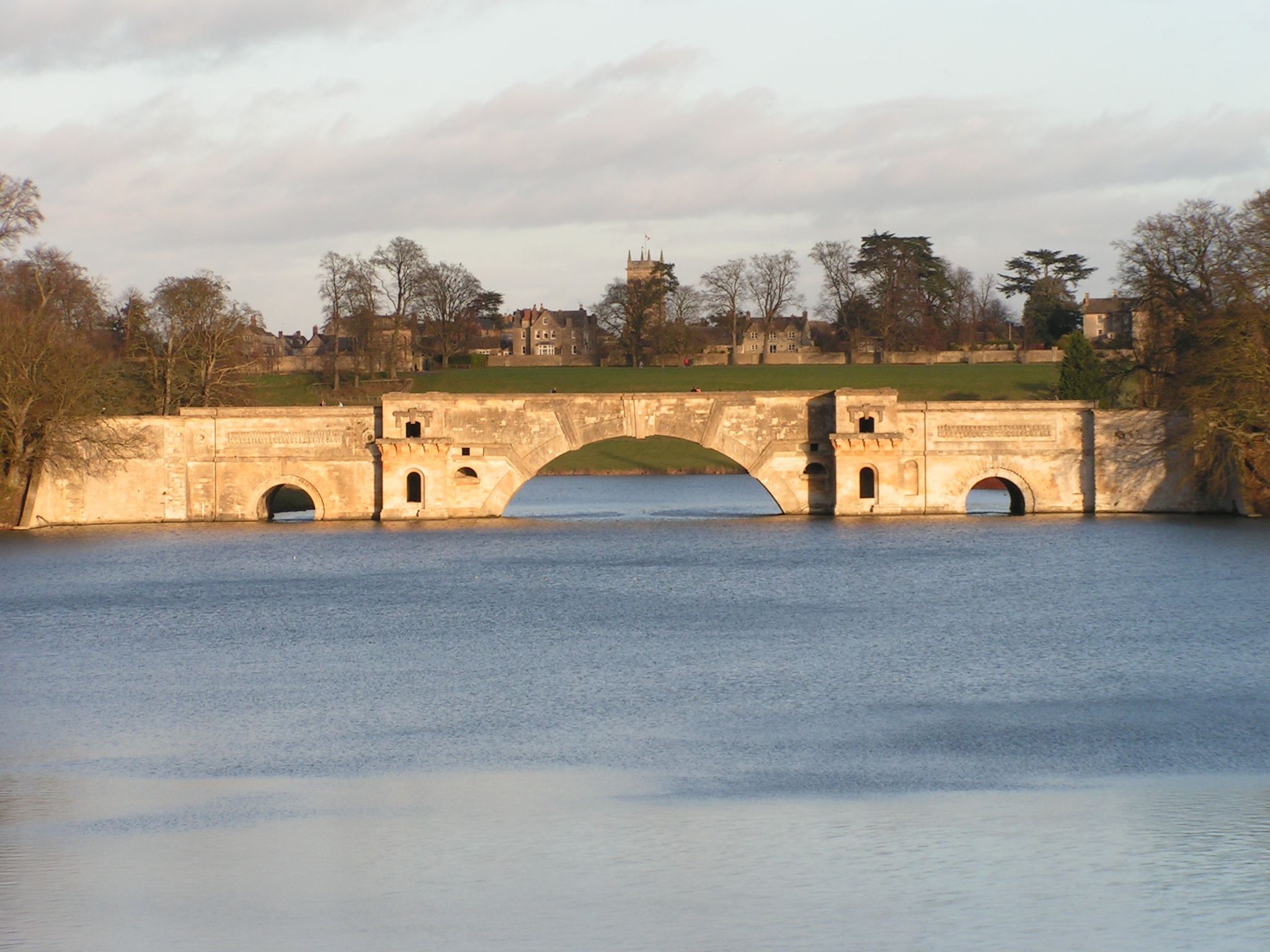
Grand Bridge, Blenheim

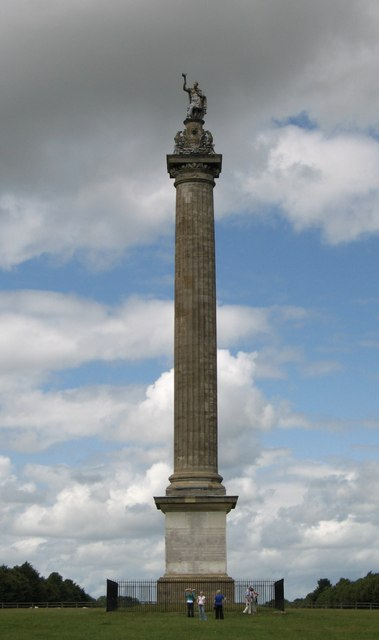
The Column of Victory, Blenheim Palace

He was baptised at St Giles's Church, Oxford on 17 December 1676, the son of John Townesend the Elder (1648-1728), who was a prominent mason who served as Mayor of Oxford in 1720/1. John's wife was Elizabeth Morrell (d.1726) and William was one of four children. His father was one of the main masons working on Blenheim Palace and nicknamed "Old Pincher". Townesend's eldest son, John Townesend the Younger (d.1742), was also a stonemason, with a yard in London, his most noteworthy structures being St Mary-le-Strand and the Mansion House, London.

William was apprenticed to his father and would have become a Freeman mason around 1690. By 1704 he was "college mason" to Christ Church, Oxford.

He died in Oxford on 22 September 1739. He is thought to be buried in the family plot in St Giles Churchyard in Oxford. His will was read on 5 October 1739, and is held in the National Archives at Kew.

== Family ==
He was married to Mary around 1703.

Their son John (1709-1746) was also a stonemason and sculptor. Following his father's death in 1739 John completed the Radcliffe Library.

== Architectural works ==
- Remodelling at Carfax, Oxford (1707)
- Peckwater Quadrangle of Christ Church, Oxford (1709)
- Clarendon Building, Oxford (1712) under Nicholas Hawksmoor
- Chapel and Hall at Queen's College, Oxford (1714) interior and exterior
- Library at Queen's College, Oxford
- Link between Hall and Chapel (1718)
- Remodelling interior of Chapel at All Souls College, Oxford (1719)
- Altarpiece in Chapel (1719)
- Major work at Blenheim Palace with Bartholomew Peisley (1721 onwards) in place of his elderly father to the designs of Hawksmoor
- Grand Bridge at Blenheim (1721)
- Triumphal Arch (Woodstock Gate) at Blenheim (1721)
- Radley House (1721 to 1725)
- Chapel interior at Blenheim (c.1723)
- Column of Victory in Blenheim Park (1727) to the designs of Henry Flitcroft
- Hall and kitchen at All Souls College, Oxford (1729)
- Cupola at Queen's College, Oxford (1733)
- Radcliffe Camera with William Smith of Warwick (1737 until death) to the designs of James Gibbs

== Monuments ==
- Bust of John Wallis in St Mary's Church Oxford (1703)
- Monument to Sir Thomas Powell in Llanbadarn near Aberystwyth (1706)
- Bust of David Gregory in St Mary's Church Oxford (1708)
- Monument to James and John Narborough in Oxford Cathedral (1708)
- Monument to his father John Townesend in St Giles churchyard Oxford (1728)

=== Gallery ===
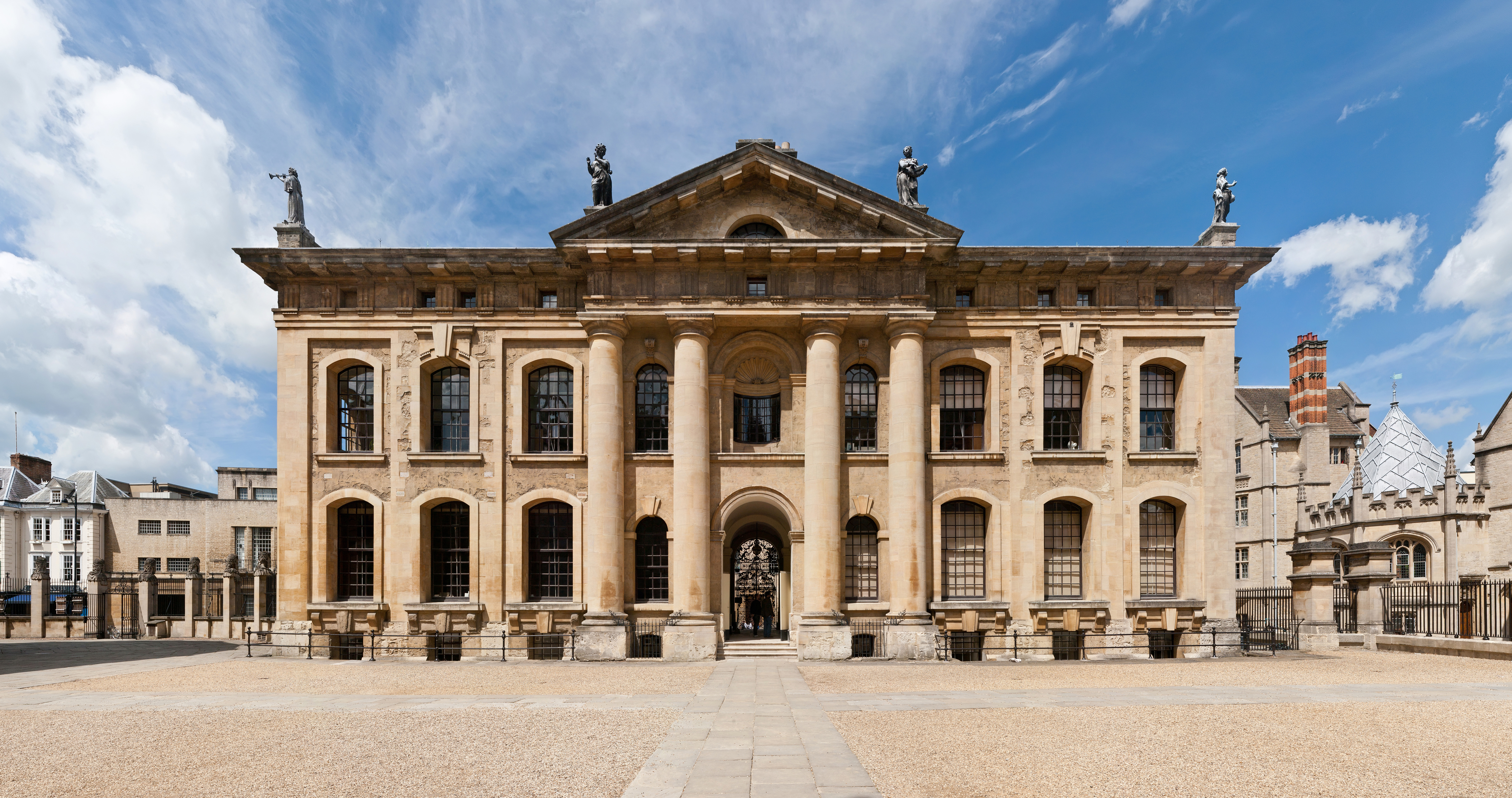
Clarendon Building

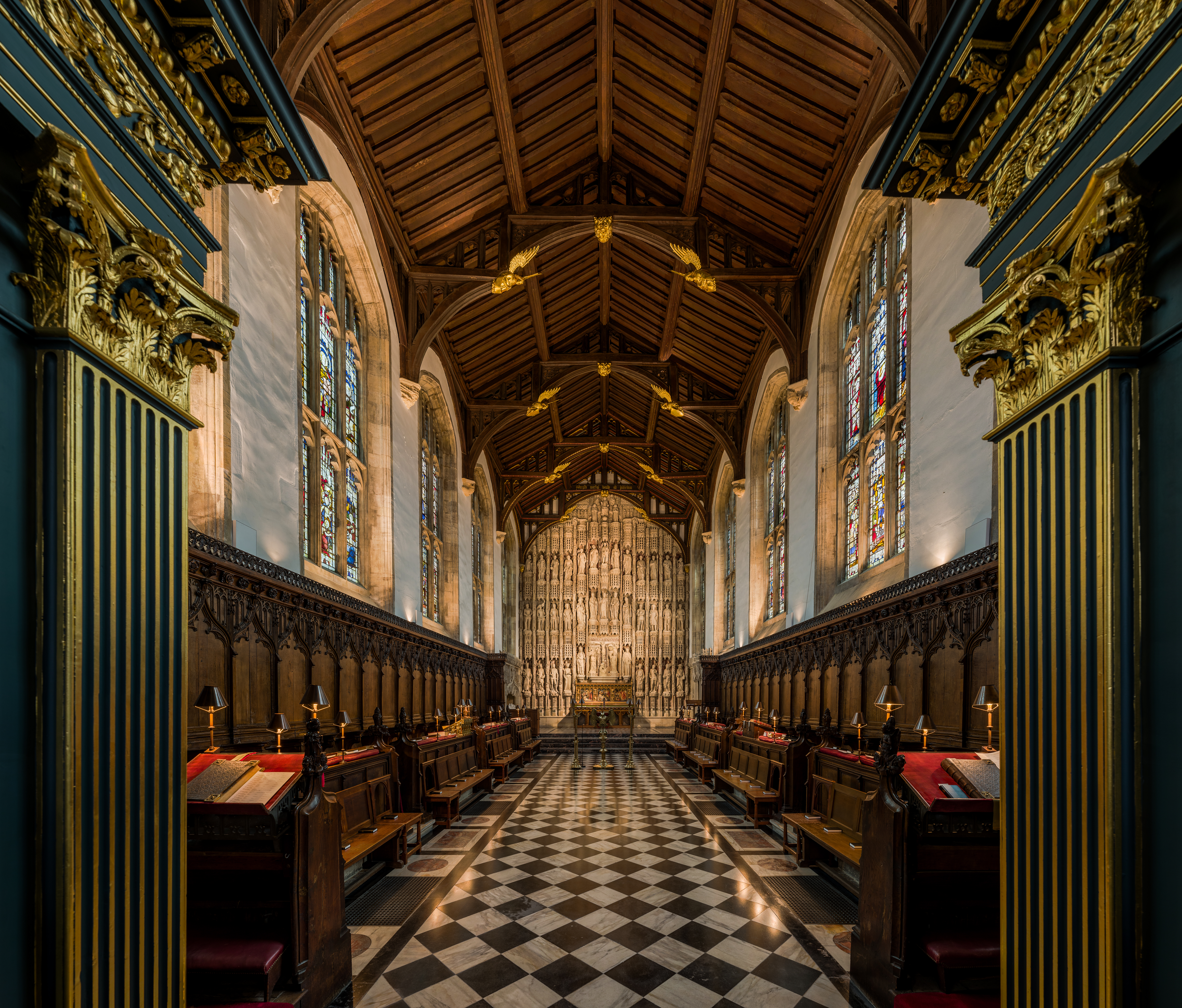
All Souls College Chapel Interior, Oxford

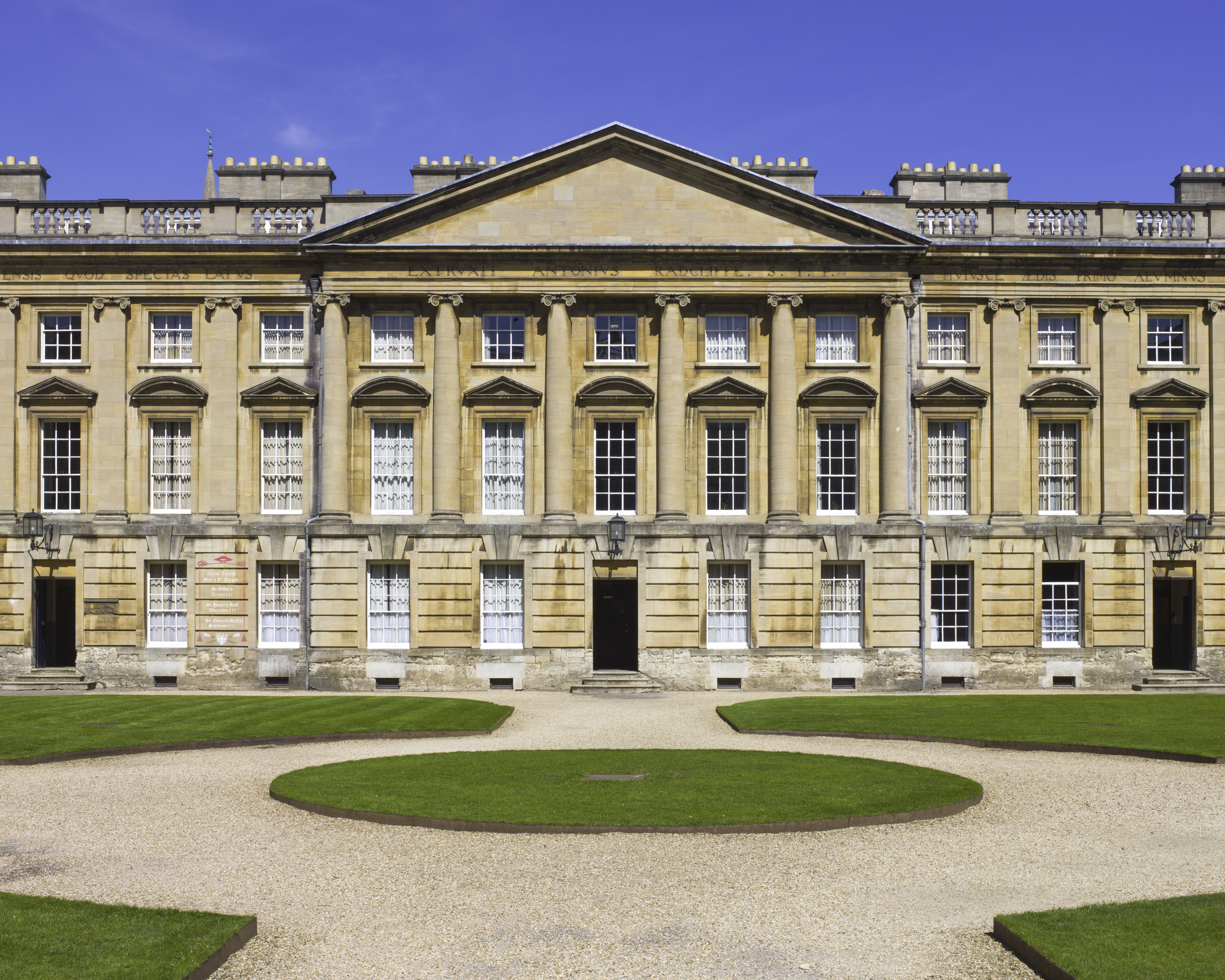
Peckwater Quadrangle, Christ Church

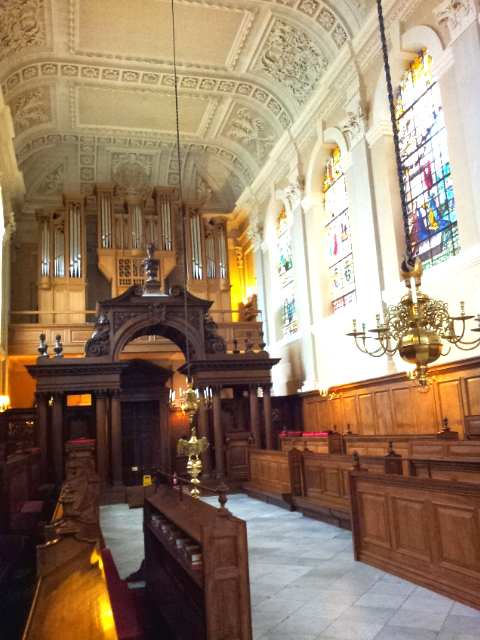
Chapel at Queen's College, Oxford

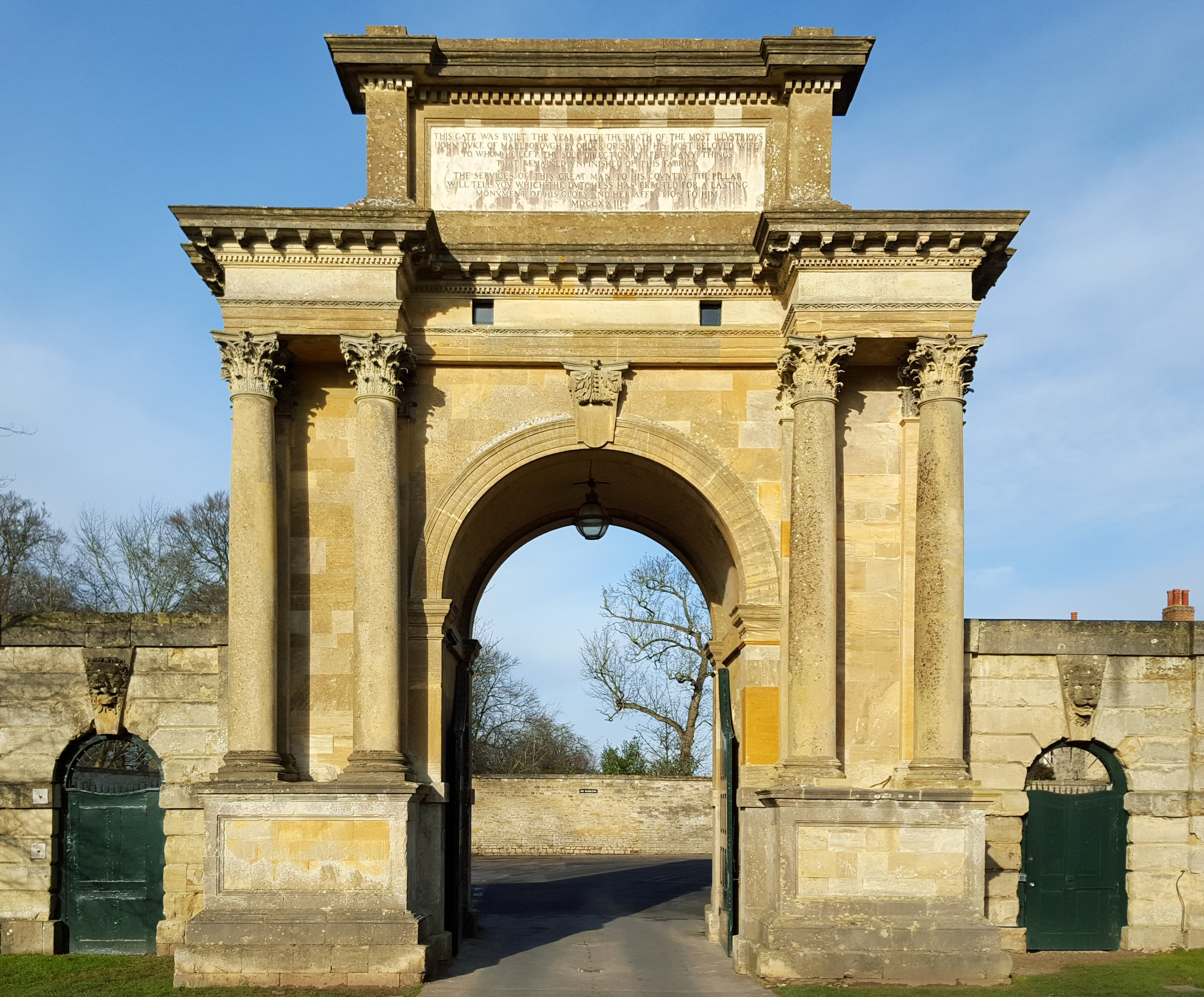
Woodstock Gate, Blenheim Palace
