= Christ Church Mercury Fountain =

Fountain at Christ Church, Oxford, England

Mercury Fountain
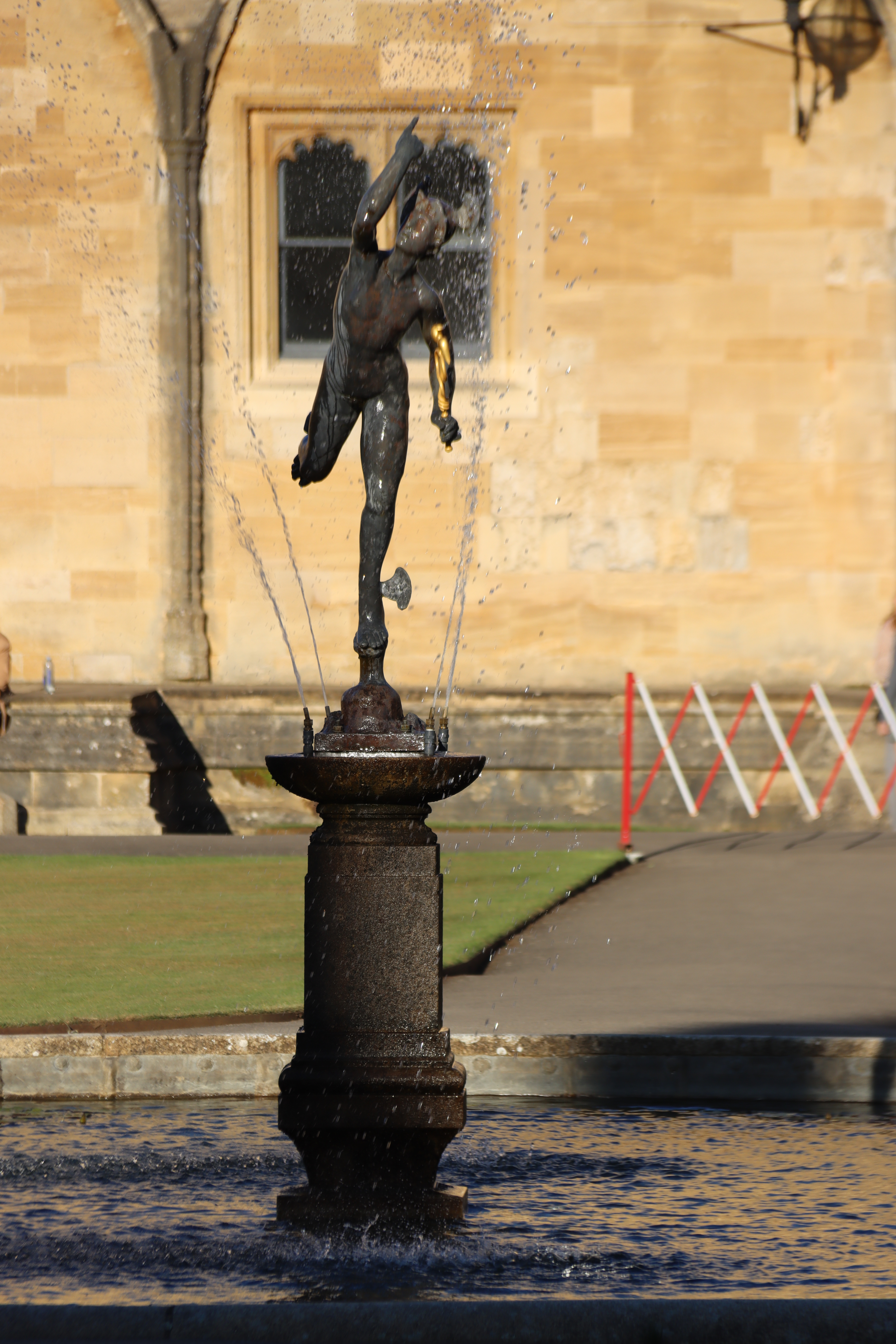
- Artist: after Giambologna
- Medium: Lead
- Designation: Grade I
- Condition: Good
- Location: 51.7503°N 1.2559°W
- Owner: Christ Church, Oxford

The Mercury Fountain stands in the centre of the Great Quadrangle, commonly Tom Quad, at Christ Church, Oxford, England. The third statue to stand at the site, it was donated in 1928. The figure of Mercury, Roman god of business, communication, divination, eloquence, gain, luck, thieves, travellers, and trickery, is modelled on a 16th-century statue by Giambologna. The large basin in which the statue stands is earlier, from the 1670s. The statue's pedestal is by Sir Edwin Lutyens and dates from 1935. The fountain is a Grade I listed structure.

== History and description ==
Christ Church, a constituent college of the University of Oxford in England was founded by Henry VIII in 1546. Its origins are some twenty years earlier, in the plans for his Cardinal College, initiated by Thomas Wolsey, Lord Chancellor of England and Archbishop of York in 1525. On Wolsey's fall from power in 1529, the King continued work at the site, renamed King Henry VIII's College, through the 1530s, before re-founding the college as Christ Church in the following decade. At the centre of Wolsey's plans lay the Great Quadrangle, generally Tom Quad, begun to his designs and completed by Sir Christopher Wren in the 1680s. The centrally-positioned basin dates from the time of Wren's work, or immediately prior. Its original purpose was primarily utilitarian rather than ornamental, to provide a water source in the event of fire. It was nevertheless decorated with a globe surmounted by a fountain in the shape of a serpent. These were replaced by a statue of Mercury in 1695. (Note: The Serpent Fountain is now located in the Christ Church War Memorial Garden.)

This statue survived till 1817, when it was almost completely destroyed during a bout of student exuberance by Edward Stanley, later 14th Earl of Derby and three times Prime Minister. The head, all that remains, is now displayed in the college library. The fountain has historically been the scene of riotous student behaviour. The attempted dunking of the fictional Anthony Blanche, in Evelyn Waugh’s novel Brideshead Revisited, echoes a long-standing Victorian tradition of hearties depositing more aesthetic members of the college in the basin.

The fountain had to wait over a century for the provision of a replacement. In 1928, Harold Bompas, an art collector and former student of Christ Church, donated a figure of Mercury in lead. The artist is unrecorded, but the statue is based on one by the 16th century Italian sculptor Giambologna which is now held in the Louvre in Paris. In 1935, a pedestal base was designed by Sir Edwin Lutyens. In 2022, prompted by a programme of repairs to the basin, Christ Church commissioned a full restoration of the statue by Rupert Harris Conservation, a specialist firm of metalwork conservators. (Note: Rupert Harris acts as the metalwork conservation advisors to the National Trust.) The statue, which had developed a distinct slant, and which was also found to have a misplaced arm, was reconditioned and cleaned, and replaced in the quad in early 2023.

The statue is cast in lead. Its date is unrecorded. Mercury stands on one leg, atop the head of a putto. His right hand points skyward, and in his left, he holds a caduceus. This was regilded in 24-carat gold leaf during the 2022 restoration. The statue is on a semi-circular bowl which concludes the stone pedestal designed by Lutyens. The fountain is a Grade I listed structure.

== Gallery ==
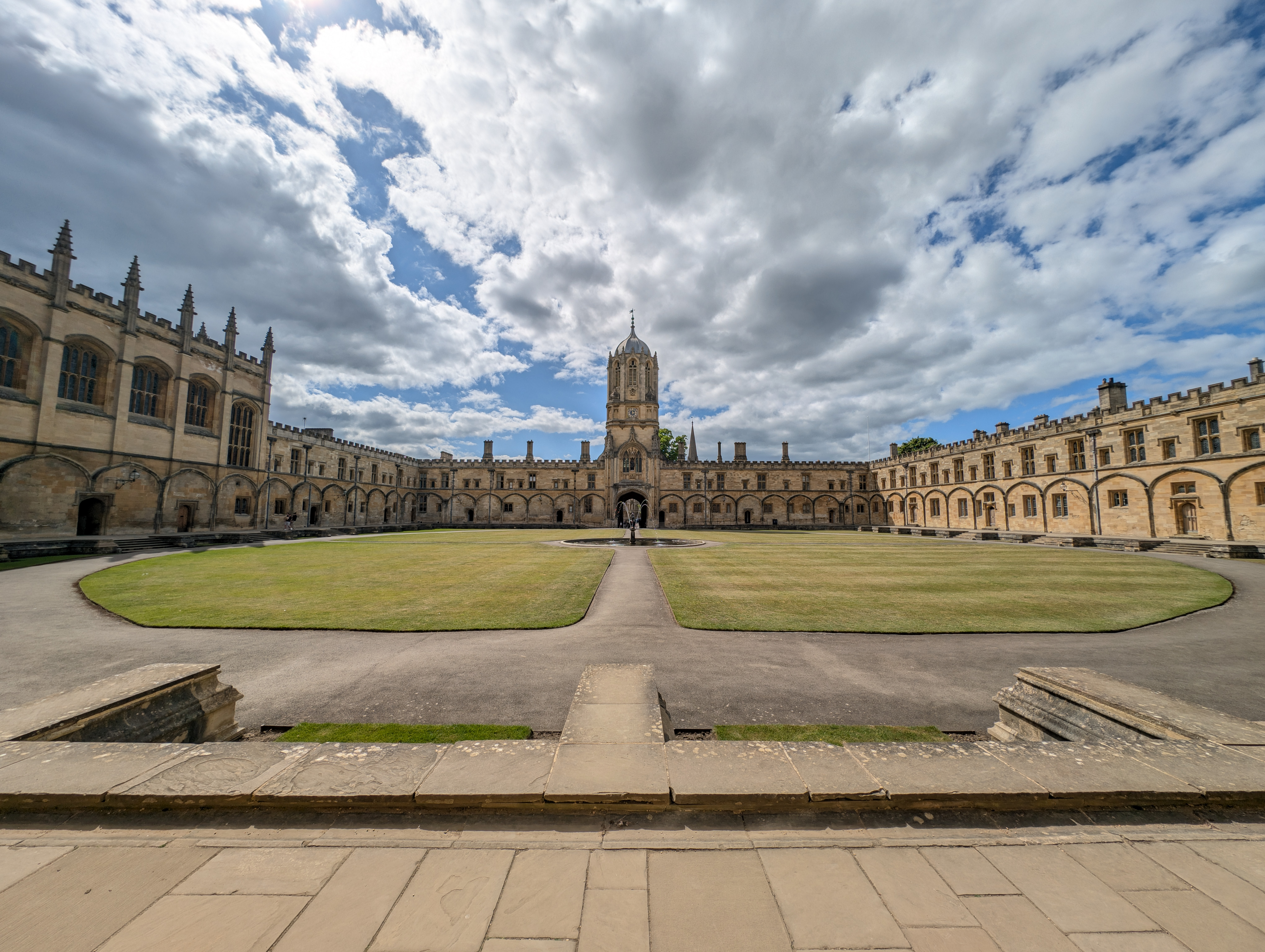
The fountain in the centre of Tom Quad

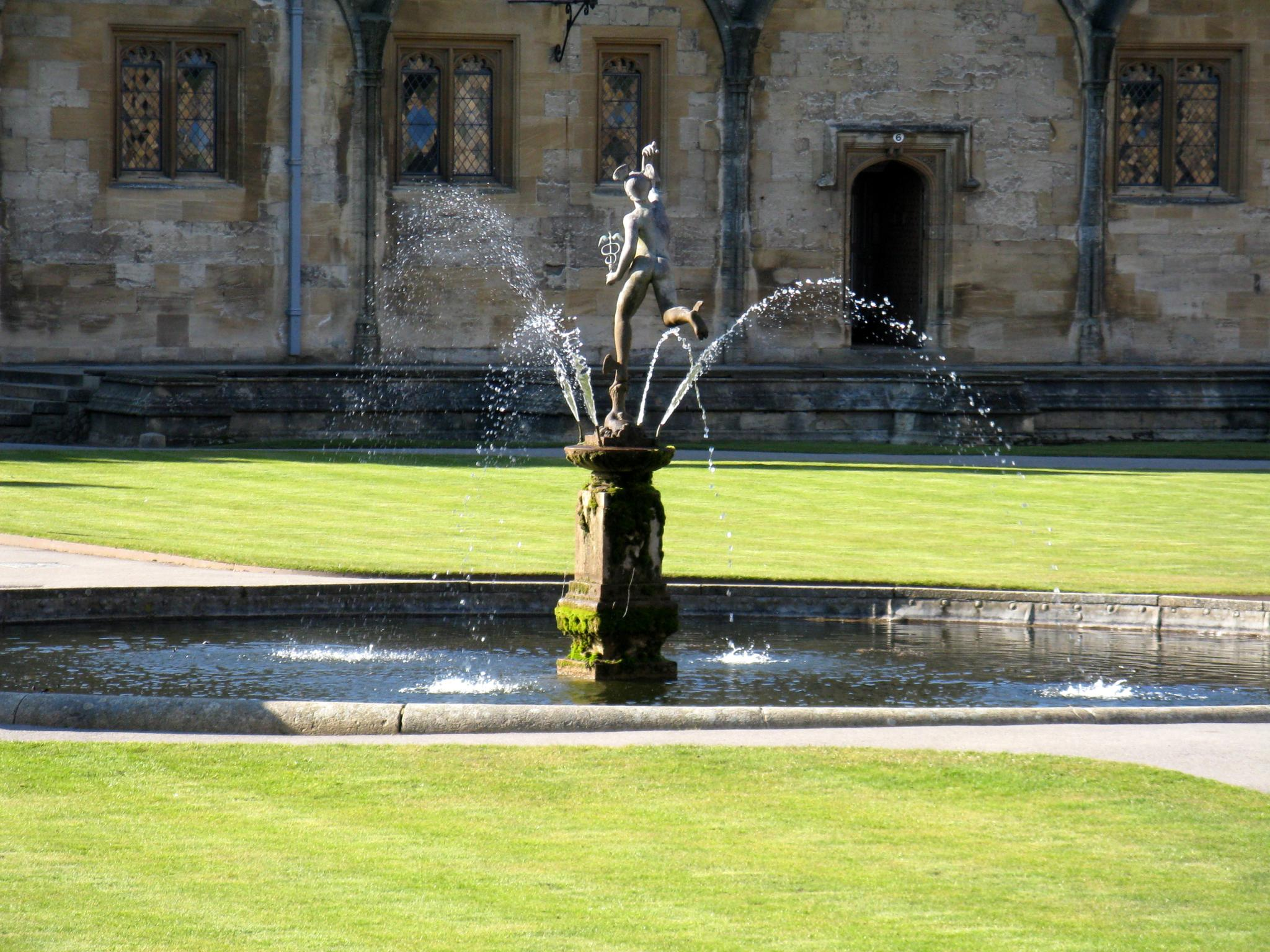
A rear view of the fountain in 2010

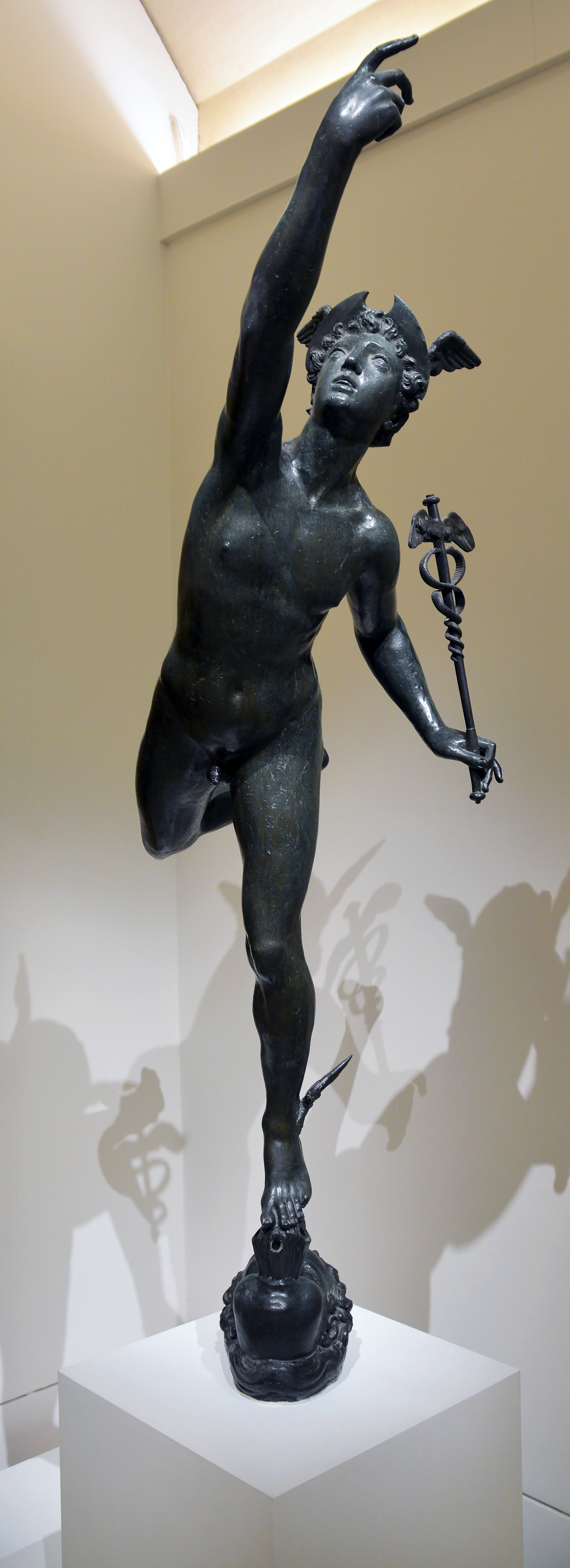
The model for the statue, held in the Louvre

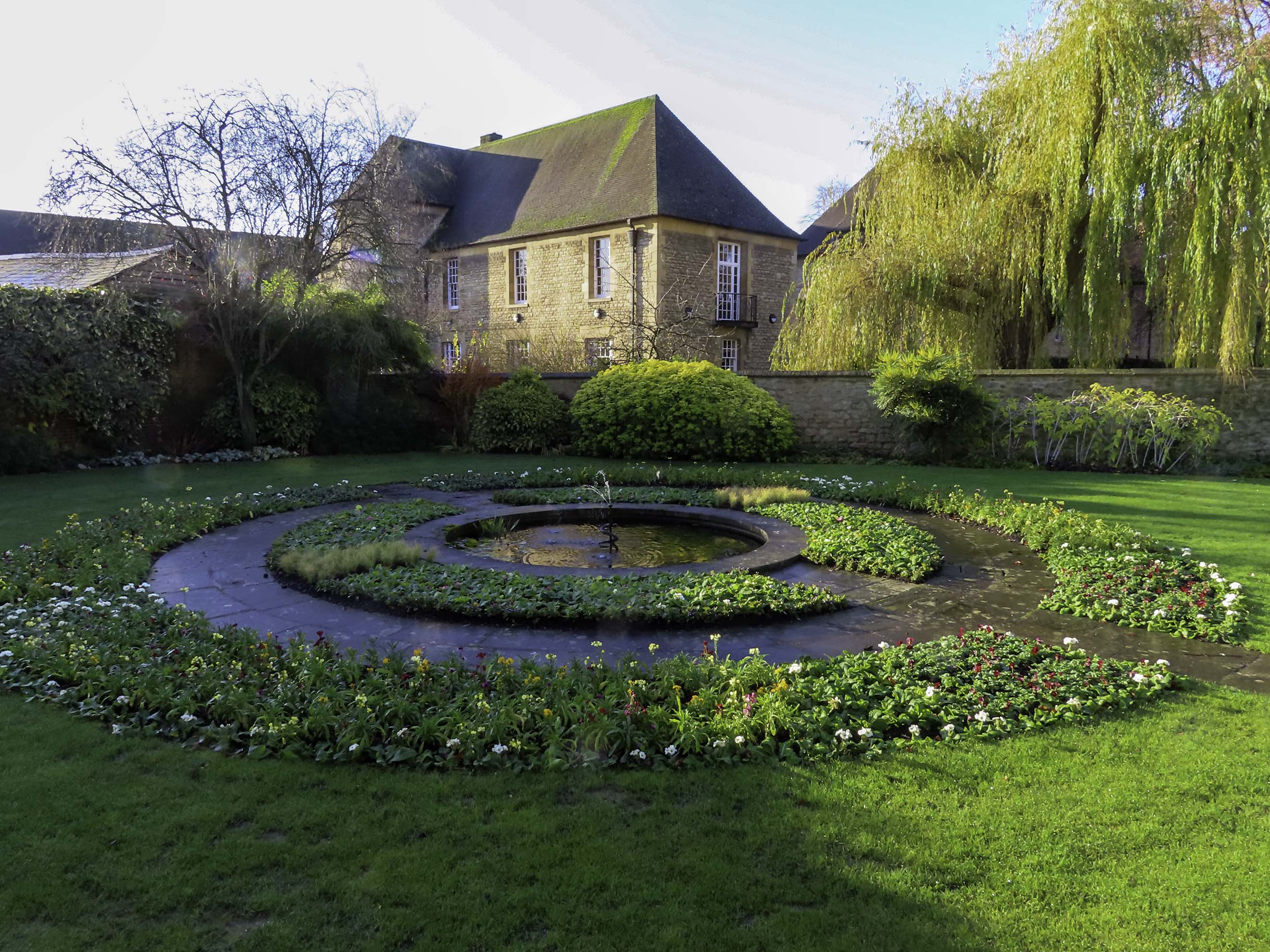
The original Serpent Fountain, now in the Christ Church War Memorial Garden

== Sources ==
- Sherwood, Jennifer; Pevsner, Nikolaus (2002). Oxfordshire. The Buildings of England. New Haven, US and London: Yale University Press. ISBN 978-0-300-09639-2.
- Christ Church (2023). A brief history of Christ Church (PDF). Oxford: Christ Church.
