= Headington stone =

Limestone from Oxford, UK

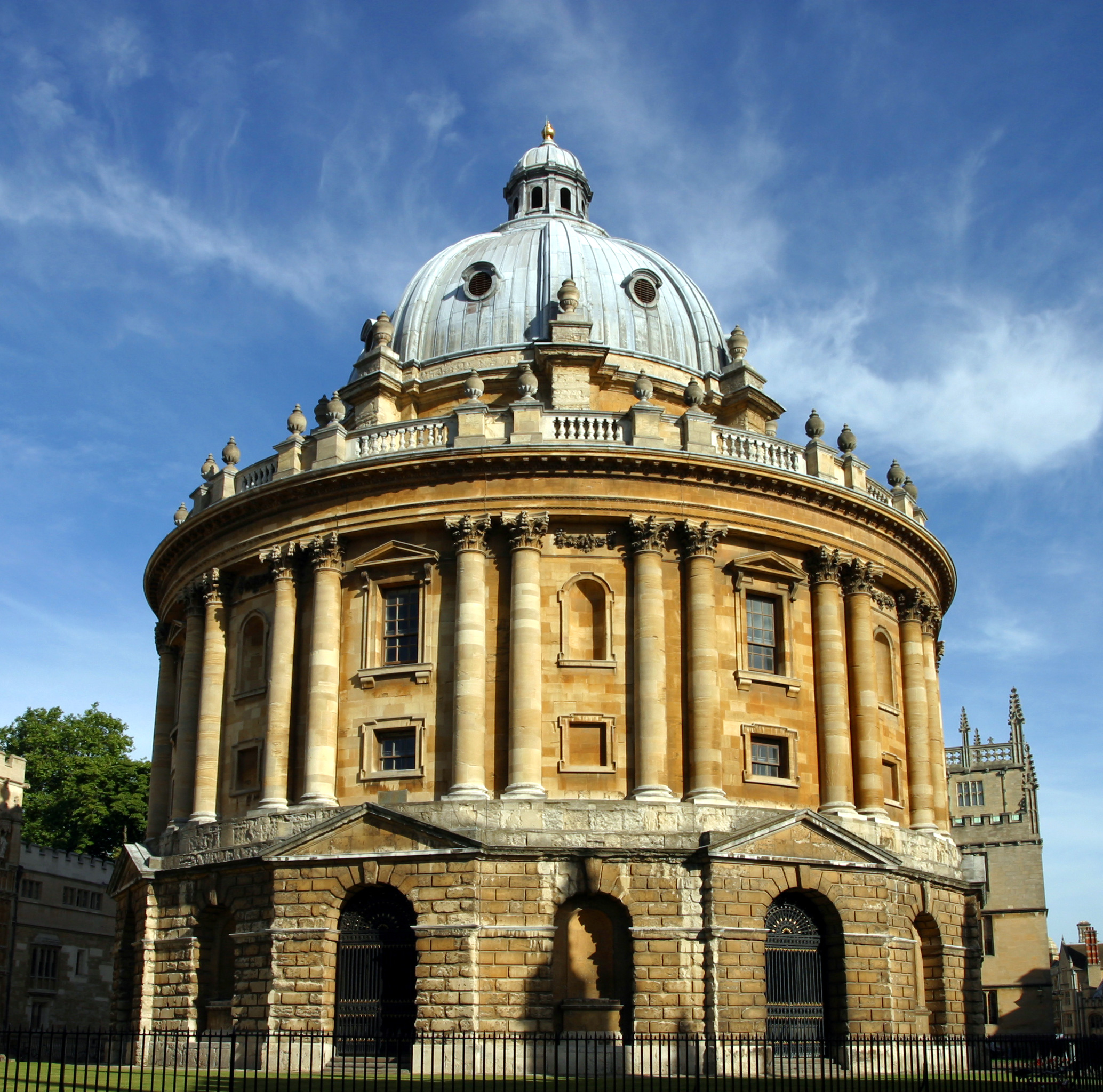
The lower part of Oxford's Radcliffe Camera library is faced in Headington stone.

Headington stone is a limestone from the Headington Quarry area of Oxford, England.

== Geology ==
Around 160 million years ago, during the Late Jurassic period, Britain was located further south and was submerged beneath a subtropical sea. The warm conditions meant that coral reefs could flourish. When the coral died, it was buried under successive layers of sediment and other debris. After millions of years, this became fossilized. It formed the Corallian Limestone that is now beneath the Headington Quarry area of Oxford.

== Quarrying ==
Historically, there were a number of stone quarries in Headington Quarry. Headington stone was traditionally used for a number of the older Oxford University college buildings. In 1396, stone from quarrying in Headington was used to build the bell-tower for New College. It was also used for Oxford's city walls. Headington stone was used in the 1520s by Cardinal Wolsey to build his Cardinal College, now known as Christ Church.

Headington stone was particularly good for building since it can be cut in any direction and thus carved relatively easily. The stone was employed in buildings outside Oxford such as for Eton College and Windsor Castle. Later stone extracted from the quarry was of less good quality, for example, that used to build the lower part of the Radcliffe Camera. The stone was prone to erosion by pollution.

== Literature ==
The use of Headington stone in Oxford University buildings was mentioned by John Betjeman (1906–1984) in his poetry:

Friend of my youth, you are dead!
and the long peal pours from the steeple
Over this sunlit quad
in our University city
And soaks in Headington stone

== See also ==
- List of types of limestone
