= Clarendon Building =

Office building, former printworks in Oxford, England

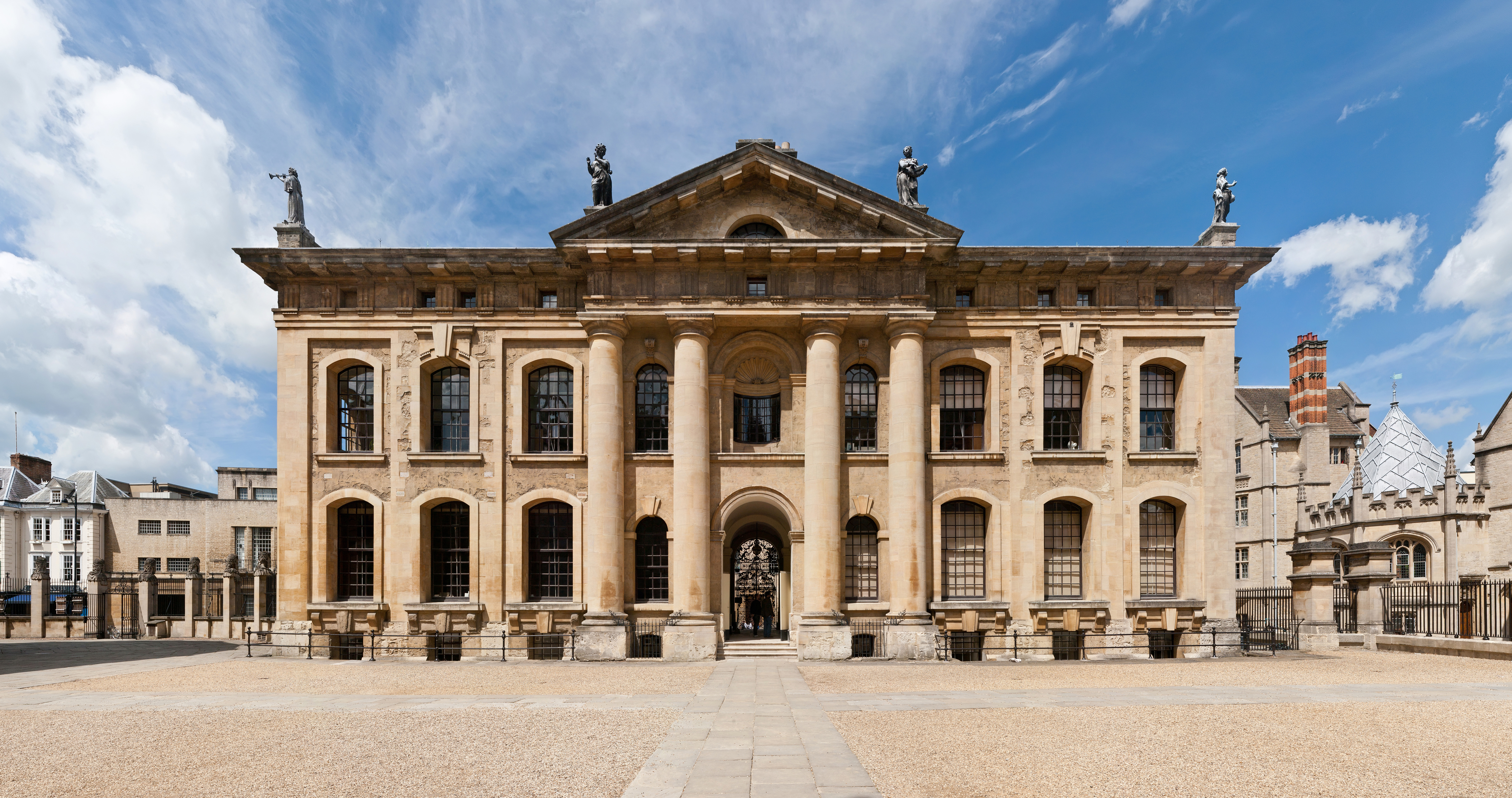
- South elevation of Clarendon Building

- Location within Oxford city centre

General information
- Type: Office building, former printworks
- Architectural style: Neoclassical
- Location: Broad Street, Oxford
- Coordinates: 51.7546°N 1.2546°W
- Construction started: 1711; 315 years ago
- Completed: 1715; 311 years ago
- Owner: University of Oxford

Design and construction
- Architect: Nicholas Hawksmoor
- Designations: Listed Grade I

The Clarendon Building is an early 18th-century neoclassical building of the University of Oxford. It is in Broad Street, Oxford, England, next to the Bodleian Library and the Sheldonian Theatre and near the centre of the city. It was built between 1711 and 1715 and is now a Grade I listed building.

== History ==
Until the early 18th century, the printing presses of the Oxford University Press (OUP) were in the basement of the Sheldonian Theatre. This meant that the compositors could not work when the Theatre was in use for ceremonies. Therefore, the University commissioned a new building to house the OUP.

Nicholas Hawksmoor produced a neoclassical design, construction started in 1711 and it was completed in 1715. The builder and sculptor was William Townesend of Oxford.

The building was funded largely from the proceeds of the commercially successful History of the Great Rebellion by the 1st Earl of Clarendon, whose legacy later paid for the building of the Clarendon Laboratory in Oxford as well.

In the 1820s, the OUP moved to new premises in Walton Street, after which the University used the Clarendon Building for administrative purposes. In 1975, the building was transferred to the Bodleian Library, for which it now provides office and meeting space for senior members of staff.

=== Student occupation ===
On 22 January 2009, student demonstrators occupied part of the Clarendon Building for seven hours, following similar protests at other UK universities. The demonstrators called for the University to condemn Israel's role in the 2008–2009 Israel–Gaza conflict and to cancel a lecture series at Balliol College inaugurated by Shimon Peres. The protestors ended their protest after an agreement with the Senior Proctor.
