= Listed buildings in Oxford (centre, western and northern part) =

Buildings in Oxford, Oxfordshire, England

Oxford is a city and non-civil parish in Oxfordshire, England. It contains 1,147 listed buildings that are recorded in the National Heritage List for England. Of these 198 are grade I, 78 are grade II* and 871 are grade II.

This list is based on the information retrieved online from Historic England. The quantity of listed buildings in Oxford requires subdivision into geographically defined lists. This list includes all listed buildings in the western and northern parts of the city centre.

== Key ==
Grade	Criteria
I	Buildings that are of exceptional interest
II*	Particularly important buildings of more than special interest
II	Buildings that are of special interest

== Listing ==
=== City Walls ===
Name	Grade	Location	Type	Completed (Note: The date given is the date used by Historic England as significant for the initial building or that of an important part in the structure's description.)	Date designated	Grid ref. (Note: The grid reference is based on the British national grid reference system, sometimes known as OSGB36, used by the Ordnance Survey.) Geo-coordinates	Notes	Entry number (Note: The "List Entry Number" is a unique number assigned to each listed building and scheduled monument by Historic England.)	Image	Wikidata
Bastion I	I	Bulwark Lane, City Wall			12 January 1954	SP5108106304; 51°45′11″N 1°15′41″W		1184380	Bastion I	Q17528600
Wall, West Of Bastion I	I	Bulwark Lane, City Wall			28 June 1972	SP5105906281; 51°45′10″N 1°15′42″W		1046609	Wall, West Of Bastion I	Q17528292
Wall, East Of Bastion I	I	Bulwark Lane, City Wall			12 January 1954	SP5110206307; 51°45′11″N 1°15′40″W		1369704	Wall, East Of Bastion I	Q17528879
City Wall, Rear Boundary of Numbers 8 to 10 Turn Again Lane	I	Roger Bacon Lane, City Wall			12 January 1954	SP5118705969; 51°45′00″N 1°15′36″W		1046583	City Wall, Rear Boundary of Numbers 8 to 10 Turn Again Lane	Q17528277
Wall, stretching about 30 yards west from Littlegate Street	I	City Wall			28 June 1972	SP5125105952; 51°45′00″N 1°15′32″W		1046582	Wall, stretching about 30 yards west from Littlegate Street	Q17528273

=== Balliol College ===
Name	Grade	Location	Type	Completed	Date designated	Grid ref. Geo-coordinates	Notes	Entry number	Image	Wikidata
Balliol College, Brackenbury Buildings, Front Quadrangle	II	Balliol College			29 January 1968	SP5138206462; 51°45′16″N 1°15′25″W		1198304	Balliol College, Brackenbury Buildings, Front Quadrangle	Q26494253
Balliol College, Chapel, Front Quadrangle	II	Balliol College			12 January 1954	SP5136806493; 51°45′17″N 1°15′26″W		1369622	Balliol College, Chapel, Front Quadrangle More images	Q26650940
Balliol College, Hall Range On North Side	II	Balliol College			12 January 1954	SP5130506570; 51°45′20″N 1°15′29″W		1198317	Balliol College, Hall Range On North Side	Q26494266
Balliol College, Library, Front Quadrangle	I	Balliol College			12 January 1954	SP5134606484; 51°45′17″N 1°15′27″W		1046765	Balliol College, Library, Front Quadrangle More images	Q17528503
Balliol College, Masters Lodging, Garden Quadrangle	II	Balliol College			29 January 1968	SP5132406449; 51°45′16″N 1°15′28″W		1046766	Balliol College, Masters Lodging, Garden Quadrangle	Q26298855
Balliol College, Old Hall (New Library) and Masters Lodging, Front Quadrangle	I	Balliol College			12 January 1954	SP5133506463; 51°45′16″N 1°15′28″W		1369621	Balliol College, Old Hall (New Library) and Masters Lodging, Front Quadrangle More images	Q805285
Balliol College, Salvin Tower, Front Quadrangle	II	Balliol College			12 January 1954	SP5132906481; 51°45′17″N 1°15′28″W		1198300	Balliol College, Salvin Tower, Front Quadrangle	Q26494249
Balliol College, Fisher Buildings, Garden Quarangle	II	Balliol College			12 January 1954	SP5130206441; 51°45′16″N 1°15′29″W		1369623	Balliol College, Fisher Buildings, Garden Quarangle	Q26650941
Balliol College, Range in north west angle, Garden Quadrangle	II	Balliol College			28 June 1972	SP5125906563; 51°45′20″N 1°15′32″W		1369624	Balliol College, Range in north west angle, Garden Quadrangle More images	Q26650942
Balliol College, Basevi Buildings, Garden Quadrangle	II	Balliol College			12 January 1954	SP5128606475; 51°45′17″N 1°15′30″W		1046767	Balliol College, Basevi Buildings, Garden Quadrangle	Q26298856
Balliol College, Range north of Basevi Buildings, Garden Quadrangle	II	Balliol College			12 January 1954	SP5128106491; 51°45′17″N 1°15′31″W		1283906	Balliol College, Range north of Basevi Buildings, Garden Quadrangle	Q26572722
Balliol College, Bristol Buildings, Garden Quadrangle	II	Balliol College			12 January 1954	SP5128906453; 51°45′16″N 1°15′30″W		1198308	Upload Photo	Q26494257
Balliol College, Salvin Buildings, Garden Quadrangle	II	Balliol College			12 January 1954	SP5126906520; 51°45′18″N 1°15′31″W		1046768	Balliol College, Salvin Buildings, Garden Quadrangle More images	Q26298857

=== Harris Manchester College ===
Name	Grade	Location	Type	Completed	Date designated	Grid ref. Geo-coordinates	Notes	Entry number	Image	Wikidata
Harris Manchester College	II	Mansfield Road, OX1 3TD			28 June 1972	SP5172606630; 51°45′22″N 1°15′07″W		1046676	Harris Manchester College More images	Q2706726
Boundary wall and screen of Harris Manchester College fronting Mansfield Road	II	Harris Manchester College, Mansfield Road, OX1 3TD			28 June 1972	SP5174206572; 51°45′20″N 1°15′06″W		1369658	Boundary wall and screen of Harris Manchester College fronting Mansfield Road More images	Q26650961
Screen on the south side of Chapel Court	II	Harris Manchester College, Mansfield Road, OX1 3TD			28 June 1972	SP5173006557; 51°45′19″N 1°15′07″W		1046677	Screen on the south side of Chapel Court More images	Q26298805

=== Keble College ===
Name	Grade	Location	Type	Completed	Date designated	Grid ref. Geo-coordinates	Notes	Entry number	Image	Wikidata
Keble College, North Quadrangle Keble College, The Front	I	Keble College			12 January 1954	SP5130507013; 51°45′34″N 1°15′29″W		1046691	Keble College, North Quadrangle Keble College, The Front More images	Q17528411
Keble College, South Quadrangle Keble College, The Pusey	I	Keble College			12 January 1954	SP5134906889; 51°45′30″N 1°15′27″W		1046692	Keble College, South Quadrangle Keble College, The Pusey More images	Q1276338
De Breyne and Hayward Buildings at Keble College, iIncluding Middle Common Room and Bar, Fellows Flat, Transformer Station, Workshops and gates	II*	Blackhall Road			4 October 1999	SP5131006884; 51°45′30″N 1°15′29″W		1130378	De Breyne and Hayward Buildings at Keble College, iIncluding Middle Common Room and Bar, Fellows Flat, Transformer Station, Workshops and gates More images	Q17548724

=== Mansfield College ===
Name	Grade	Location	Type	Completed	Date designated	Grid ref. Geo-coordinates	Notes	Entry number	Image	Wikidata
Mansfield College	II*	Mansfield College			12 January 1954	SP5164606817; 51°45′28″N 1°15′11″W		1046678	Mansfield College More images	Q2487309
Screen in front of the Chapel along Mansfield Road	II	Mansfield College			28 June 1972	SP5170206829; 51°45′28″N 1°15′08″W		1369659	Screen in front of the Chapel along Mansfield Road	Q26650962

=== Nuffield College ===
Name	Grade	Location	Type	Completed	Date designated	Grid ref. Geo-coordinates	Notes	Entry number	Image	Wikidata
Nuffield College	II	New Road			30 March 1993	SP5099806274; 51°45′10″N 1°15′45″W		1278775	Nuffield College More images	Q4986652
Nuffield College, Kerbstones Surrounding Pool	II	New Road			30 March 1993	SP5097006280; 51°45′10″N 1°15′47″W		1047053	Nuffield College, Kerbstones Surrounding Pool	Q26299165

=== Pembroke College ===
Name	Grade	Location	Type	Completed	Date designated	Grid ref. Geo-coordinates	Notes	Entry number	Image	Wikidata
Master's Lodging, Pembroke College	II*	Pembroke College			12 January 1954	SP5138405965; 51°45′00″N 1°15′25″W		1046665	Master's Lodging, Pembroke College More images	Q17548447
Pembroke College, Back Quadrangle	II	Pembroke College			12 January 1954	SP5125205975; 51°45′00″N 1°15′32″W		1200689	Upload Photo	Q26496468
Pembroke College, Chapel, South Range	I	Old (Main) Quadrangle, Pembroke College			12 January 1954	SP5131805951; 51°45′00″N 1°15′29″W		1369653	Pembroke College, Chapel, South Range	Q17528816
Pembroke College, East Range	I	Old (Main) Quadrangle, Pembroke College			12 January 1954	SP5135105956; 51°45′00″N 1°15′27″W		1046664	Pembroke College, East Range	Q17528377
Pembroke College, North Range including Library and North Wing	I	Main Quadrangle, Pembroke College			12 January 1954	SP5133105976; 51°45′00″N 1°15′28″W		1046663	Pembroke College, North Range including Library and North Wing	Q17528375
Pembroke College, Screen on Pembroke Square between the North Range of the Main Quadrangle and the Masters Lodge	II	Pembroke College			28 June 1972	SP5136205974; 51°45′00″N 1°15′27″W		1200734	Pembroke College, Screen on Pembroke Square between the North Range of the Main Quadrangle and the Masters Lodge	Q26496511
Pembroke College, South Wall of Back Quadrangle	II	Pembroke College			28 June 1972	SP5126205959; 51°45′00″N 1°15′32″W		1369655	Upload Photo	Q26650959
Pembroke College, Staircase 12 (Part of)	II	27, Pembroke Street			22 June 1972	SP5124206032; 51°45′02″N 1°15′33″W		1046672	Pembroke College, Staircase 12 (Part of)	Q26298803
Pembroke College, Staircase 12 (Part of)	II	26, Pembroke Street			22 June 1972	SP5124706030; 51°45′02″N 1°15′33″W		1183468	Pembroke College, Staircase 12 (Part of)	Q26478702
Pembroke College, Staircase 12 (Part of)	II	25, Pembroke Street			12 January 1954	SP5125206030; 51°45′02″N 1°15′32″W		1046671	Pembroke College, Staircase 12 (Part of)	Q26298802
Pembroke College, Staircase 13 (Part of)	II	24, Pembroke Street			12 January 1954	SP5125706030; 51°45′02″N 1°15′32″W		1046670	Pembroke College, Staircase 13 (Part of)	Q26298801
Pembroke College, Staircase 13 (Part of)	II	23, Pembroke Street			12 January 1954	SP5126406028; 51°45′02″N 1°15′32″W		1046669	Pembroke College, Staircase 13 (Part of)	Q26298800
Pembroke College, Staircase 14 (Part of)	II	22, Pembroke Street			12 January 1954	SP5126806028; 51°45′02″N 1°15′31″W		1200782	Pembroke College, Staircase 14 (Part of)	Q26678861
Pembroke College, Staircase 14 (Part of)	II	21, Pembroke Street			12 January 1954	SP5127206027; 51°45′02″N 1°15′31″W		1046668	Pembroke College, Staircase 14 (Part of)	Q26298798
Pembroke College, Staircase 15 (Part of)	II	20, Pembroke Street			12 January 1954	SP5127806027; 51°45′02″N 1°15′31″W		1200760	Pembroke College, Staircase 15 (Part of)	Q26496533
Pembroke College, Staircase 15 (Part of)	II	19, Pembroke Street			28 June 1972	SP5128506026; 51°45′02″N 1°15′31″W		1369656	Pembroke College, Staircase 15 (Part of)	Q26687028
Pembroke College, Staircase 16 (Part of)	II*	17, Pembroke Street			12 January 1954	SP5129006027; 51°45′02″N 1°15′30″W		1046667	Pembroke College, Staircase 16 (Part of)	Q17548451
Pembroke College, Staircase 16 (Part of)	II	16, Pembroke Street			28 June 1972	SP5129706027; 51°45′02″N 1°15′30″W		1200742	Pembroke College, Staircase 16 (Part of)	Q26496518
Pembroke College, Staircase 17	II	15, Pembroke Street			28 June 1972	SP5130506025; 51°45′02″N 1°15′30″W		1046666	Pembroke College, Staircase 17	Q26298797
Pembroke College, Wall forming West boundary of Back Quadrangle	II	Back Quadrangle, Pembroke College			28 June 1972	SP5123805981; 51°45′01″N 1°15′33″W		1369654	Pembroke College, Wall forming West boundary of Back Quadrangle	Q26650958
Pembroke College, West Range	I	Main Quadrangle, Pembroke College			12 January 1954	SP5131405965; 51°45′00″N 1°15′29″W		1200662	Pembroke College, West Range	Q67147053
Wall in Brewer Street, being South Wall of Pembroke College	I	Pembroke College, City Wall			12 January 1954	SP5131605948; 51°45′00″N 1°15′29″W		1046581	Wall in Brewer Street, being South Wall of Pembroke College	Q17528269

=== Somerville College ===
Name	Grade	Location	Type	Completed	Date designated	Grid ref. Geo-coordinates	Notes	Entry number	Image	Wikidata
Somerville College, Hall And Maitland Block	II	Somerville College			12 January 1954	SP5101506997; 51°45′34″N 1°15′44″W		1369712	Somerville College, Hall And Maitland Block	Q26650993
Somerville College, Library	II	Somerville College			12 January 1954	SP5096807008; 51°45′34″N 1°15′47″W		1046620	Somerville College, Library More images	Q26298771
Somerville College, Walton House	II	Somerville College			28 June 1972	SP5099707023; 51°45′34″N 1°15′45″W		1046619	Somerville College, Walton House	Q26298770
Somerville College, West Building	II	Somerville College			28 June 1972	SP5091406947; 51°45′32″N 1°15′49″W		1369711	Somerville College, West Building	Q26650992
Wolfson Building at Somerville College	II	Woodstock Road			12 March 2009	SP5091006917; 51°45′31″N 1°15′50″W		1393210	Wolfson Building at Somerville College More images	Q26672391

=== St Cross College ===
Name	Grade	Location	Type	Completed	Date designated	Grid ref. Geo-coordinates	Notes	Entry number	Image	Wikidata
Pusey House	II	St Giles'			28 June 1972	SP5113806699; 51°45′24″N 1°15′38″W		1047109	Pusey House More images	Q7261714
Boundary wall of Pusey House fronting Pusey Lane	II				28 June 1972	SP5108606662; 51°45′23″N 1°15′41″W		1047110	Upload Photo	Q26299222

=== St John's College ===
Name	Grade	Location	Type	Completed	Date designated	Grid ref. Geo-coordinates	Notes	Entry number	Image	Wikidata
St John's College, West Range	I	Front Quadrangle, St John's College			12 January 1954	SP5124306635; 51°45′22″N 1°15′32″W		1046647	St John's College, West Range More images	Q67152090
St John's College, North Range including Chapel and Hall	I	Front Quadrangle, St John's College			12 January 1954	SP5126006664; 51°45′23″N 1°15′32″W		1046649	St John's College, North Range including Chapel and Hall	Q17528355
St John's College, East Range	I	Front Quadrangle, St John's College			12 January 1954	SP5128506644; 51°45′22″N 1°15′30″W		1183649	St John's College, East Range More images	Q17528572
St John's College, South Range	I	Front Quadrangle, St John's College			12 January 1954	SP5126906619; 51°45′21″N 1°15′31″W		1046648	St John's College, South Range More images	Q17528349
St John's College, Canterbury Quadrangle	I	St John's College			12 January 1954	SP5133206648; 51°45′22″N 1°15′28″W		1183654	St John's College, Canterbury Quadrangle More images	Q17528576
St John's College, Holmes Building	I	St John's College			12 January 1954	SP5130406607; 51°45′21″N 1°15′29″W		1046650	St John's College, Holmes Building	Q17528359
St John's College, Senior Common Room	I	North Quadrangle, St John's College			12 January 1954	SP5127106685; 51°45′23″N 1°15′31″W		1046653	St John's College, Senior Common Room	Q17528362
St John's College, The Beehives	II	North Quadrangle, St John's College			30 March 1993	SP5127006718; 51°45′25″N 1°15′31″W		1278860	St John's College, The Beehives	Q26568132
St John's College, The Rawlinson Building	II	North Quadrangle, St John's College			28 June 1972	SP5125106747; 51°45′25″N 1°15′32″W		1046652	St John's College, The Rawlinson Building	Q26298790
St John's College, North Block	II	North Quadrangle, St John's College			28 June 1972	SP5122706742; 51°45′25″N 1°15′33″W		1046651	St John's College, North Block More images	Q26298789
St John's College, West Block (facing St Giles)	II	North Quadrangle, St John's College			28 June 1972	SP5122906714; 51°45′24″N 1°15′33″W		1183676	St John's College, West Block (facing St Giles) More images	Q26478924
St John's College, Cooks Building	I	North Quadrangle, St John's College			12 January 1954	SP5123906674; 51°45′23″N 1°15′33″W		1300458	St John's College, Cooks Building More images	Q17528738
St John's College, Boundary Wall fronting St Giles Street, between the North Range and Cooks Building	II	St John's College			28 June 1972	SP5122906682; 51°45′23″N 1°15′33″W		1369686	St John's College, Boundary Wall fronting St Giles Street, between the North Range and Cooks Building	Q26650977
St John's College, Screen fronting St Giles Street	II	St John's College			28 June 1972	SP5124906593; 51°45′20″N 1°15′32″W		1183741	St John's College, Screen fronting St Giles Street More images	Q26478998
St John's College, Wall of forecourt in St Giles Street	II	St John's College			29 January 1968	SP5122306638; 51°45′22″N 1°15′33″W		1369687	St John's College, Wall of forecourt in St Giles Street	Q26650978
St John's College, Wall between the President's and Fellows' Gardens	II	St John's College			12 January 1954	SP5133206705; 51°45′24″N 1°15′28″W		1183724	St John's College, Wall between the President's and Fellows' Gardens	Q26478983
St John's College, Walls round The Fellows' Garden	II	St John's College			28 June 1972	SP5137006757; 51°45′26″N 1°15′26″W		1046654	St John's College, Walls round The Fellows' Garden	Q26298791
Sir Thomas White Building, St John's College	II	St John's College, St Giles, OX1 3JP			30 January 2017	SP5131706789; 51°45′27″N 1°15′29″W		1439624	Sir Thomas White Building, St John's College	Q66478134

=== St Peter's College ===
Name	Grade	Location	Type	Completed	Date designated	Grid ref. Geo-coordinates	Notes	Entry number	Image	Wikidata
St Peter's College, Chapel (Church Of St Peter Le Bailey)	II	St Peter's College			12 January 1954	SP5112806239; 51°45′09″N 1°15′39″W		1369709	St Peter's College, Chapel (Church Of St Peter Le Bailey) More images	Q5117697
St Peter's College, Dining Hall (Hannington Hall)	II	St Peter's College			12 January 1954	SP5115106224; 51°45′09″N 1°15′37″W		1369710	St Peter's College, Dining Hall (Hannington Hall)	Q26650991
St Peter's College, Emily Morris Building, Rowcroft Building	II	St Peter's College			28 June 1972	SP5110306236; 51°45′09″N 1°15′40″W		1046617	St Peter's College, Emily Morris Building, Rowcroft Building	Q26298769
St Peter's College, Linton House	II	St Peter's College			12 January 1954	SP5112606265; 51°45′10″N 1°15′39″W		1046616	St Peter's College, Linton House More images	Q26298768
St Peter's College, Screen and gates between Chapel and Hall fronting New Inn Hall Street	II	St Peter's College			28 June 1972	SP5115006238; 51°45′09″N 1°15′38″W		1245327	St Peter's College, Screen and gates between Chapel and Hall fronting New Inn Hall Street	Q26537877
St Peter's College, Barron House (previously Probate Registry)	II	St Peter's College, 10a, New Road, OX1 1LT			28 June 1972	SP5110306180; 51°45′07″N 1°15′40″W		1121996	St Peter's College, Barron House (previously Probate Registry) More images	Q26415128
Canal House	II*	Bulwark's Lane, St Peter's College, OX1 1LU			12 January 1954	SP5109006222; 51°45′09″N 1°15′41″W		1046618	Canal House	Q99671024

=== Trinity College ===
Name	Grade	Location	Type	Completed	Date designated	Grid ref. Geo-coordinates	Notes	Entry number	Image	Wikidata
Trinity College, Boundary wall wth Balliol College	II	Trinity College			28 June 1972	SP5137306517; 51°45′18″N 1°15′26″W		1046622	Upload Photo	Q26298773
Trinity College, Bust of Cardinal Newman in the College garden	II	Trinity College			28 June 1972	SP5136306607; 51°45′21″N 1°15′26″W		1046628	Trinity College, Bust of Cardinal Newman in the College garden More images	Q26298775
Trinity College, East boundary wall on Parks Road to north of gateway	II	Trinity College			28 June 1972	SP5149006646; 51°45′22″N 1°15′20″W		1046631	Trinity College, East boundary wall on Parks Road to north of gateway	Q26298778
Trinity College, East boundary wall on Parks Road to south of gateway	II	Trinity College			28 June 1972	SP5150806602; 51°45′21″N 1°15′19″W		1300332	Trinity College, East boundary wall on Parks Road to south of gateway	Q26587644
Trinity College, East Range	I	Durham Quadrangle, Trinity College			12 January 1954	SP5138606565; 51°45′20″N 1°15′25″W		1183812	Trinity College, East Range More images	Q17528580
Trinity College, East Range	II	Front Quadrangle, Trinity College			29 January 1968	SP5144106518; 51°45′18″N 1°15′22″W		1300416	Trinity College, East Range	Q26587722
Trinity College, Gate piers and grille	II*	Trinity College, Parks Road			12 January 1954	SP5149906626; 51°45′21″N 1°15′19″W		1046630	Trinity College, Gate piers and grille More images	Q17548435
Trinity College, Gateway to garden between East Range and the President's Lodging	II	Front Quadrangle, Trinity College			28 June 1972	SP5142506546; 51°45′19″N 1°15′23″W		1278361	Trinity College, Gateway to garden between East Range and the President's Lodging	Q26567692
Trinity College, Kettell Hall	II*	Front Quadrangle, Trinity College			12 January 1954	SP5146006476; 51°45′17″N 1°15′21″W		1230901	Trinity College, Kettell Hall	Q17548747
Trinity College, Kitchen (on north west)	I	Durham Quadrangle, Trinity College			12 January 1954	SP5134106552; 51°45′19″N 1°15′27″W		1369674	Trinity College, Kitchen (on north west)	Q17528851
Trinity College, Dolphin Gate (kitchen entrance)	II	Trinity College, St Giles Street			28 June 1972	SP5125306582; 51°45′20″N 1°15′32″W		1183851	Trinity College, Dolphin Gate (kitchen entrance) More images	Q26479131
Trinity College, New (War Memorial) Library	II	Front Quadrangle, Trinity College			12 January 1954	SP5147106526; 51°45′18″N 1°15′21″W		1230900	Trinity College, New (War Memorial) Library	Q26524549
Trinity College, North boundary wall of garden forming the boundary with St Johns College	II	Trinity College			28 June 1972	SP5140706632; 51°45′22″N 1°15′24″W		1046629	Trinity College, North boundary wall of garden forming the boundary with St Johns College	Q26298776
Trinity College, North Range	I	Durham Quadrangle, Trinity College			12 January 1954	SP5136606570; 51°45′20″N 1°15′26″W		1046624	Trinity College, North Range	Q17528327
Trinity College, North Range	I	Garden Quadrangle, Trinity College			12 January 1954	SP5134906600; 51°45′21″N 1°15′27″W		1046625	Trinity College, North Range	Q17528330
Trinity College, President's Lodging	II	Front Quadrangle, Trinity College			29 January 1968	SP5141006550; 51°45′19″N 1°15′24″W		1278360	Trinity College, President's Lodging	Q26567691
Trinity College, Screen between the Chapel and the President's Lodging	II	Front Quadrangle, Trinity College			28 June 1972	SP5139806542; 51°45′19″N 1°15′24″W		1369673	Upload Photo	Q26650968
Trinity College, Screen on east of Garden Quadrangle	II	Garden Quadrangle, Trinity College			28 June 1972	SP5137206586; 51°45′20″N 1°15′26″W		1300359	Trinity College, Screen on east of Garden Quadrangle	Q26587667
Trinity College, South boundary wall of garden forming the boundary with the Bodleian Library	II	Trinity College			12 January 1954	SP5148206549; 51°45′19″N 1°15′20″W		1183948	Upload Photo	Q26479245
Trinity College, South Range	I	Durham Quadrangle, Trinity College			12 January 1954	SP5138106541; 51°45′19″N 1°15′25″W		1183850	Trinity College, South Range More images	Q17528584
Trinity College, South Range with the Main Gate	II	Front Quad, Trinity College, Broad Street			12 January 1954	SP5142106467; 51°45′16″N 1°15′23″W		1046621	Trinity College, South Range with the Main Gate More images	Q26298772
Trinity College, Wall of President's Garden	II	Trinity College			28 June 1972	SP5140606590; 51°45′20″N 1°15′24″W		1046627	Upload Photo	Q26298774
Trinity College, West Range	I	Durham Quadrangle, Trinity College			12 January 1954	SP5135506536; 51°45′19″N 1°15′27″W		1046623	Trinity College, West Range	Q17528321
Trinity College, West Range	I	Garden Quadrangle, Trinity College			12 January 1954	SP5133606584; 51°45′20″N 1°15′28″W		1046626	Trinity College, West Range	Q122888178

=== Wadham College ===
Name	Grade	Location	Type	Completed	Date designated	Grid ref. Geo-coordinates	Notes	Entry number	Image	Wikidata
Wadham College, Main Quadrangle including Chapel, Hall, Kitchen, Library and Cloister	I	Wadham College			12 January 1954	SP5159006623; 51°45′21″N 1°15′14″W		1369701	Wadham College, Main Quadrangle including Chapel, Hall, Kitchen, Library and Cloister More images	Q2537765
Wadham College, Old Stable Buildings on Parks Road	II	Wadham College			28 June 1972	SP5152306628; 51°45′22″N 1°15′18″W		1369703	Wadham College, Old Stable Buildings on Parks Road More images	Q26650989
Wadham College, South Block	II*	Wadham College, Parks Road			12 January 1954	SP5154606566; 51°45′20″N 1°15′17″W		1046599	Wadham College, South Block More images	Q17548429
Wadham College, Barn on the east boundary of the College	II	Wadham College			28 June 1972	SP5164506605; 51°45′21″N 1°15′12″W		1369702	Wadham College, Barn on the east boundary of the College	Q26650988
Wadham College, West boundary wall on Parks Road	II	Wadham College			28 June 1972	SP5149106688; 51°45′23″N 1°15′19″W		1046601	Wadham College, West boundary wall on Parks Road	Q26298762
Wadham College, North boundary wall of College garden	II	Wadham College			28 June 1972	SP5156806713; 51°45′24″N 1°15′15″W		1046600	Upload Photo	Q26298761
Wadham College, East garden wall to Fellows' Garden	II	Wadham College			12 January 1954	SP5161406687; 51°45′23″N 1°15′13″W		1046602	Upload Photo	Q26298763
Wadham College, West garden wall to Fellows' Garden	II	Wadham College			12 January 1954	SP5154406672; 51°45′23″N 1°15′17″W		1046603	Upload Photo	Q26298764

=== Worcester College ===
Name	Grade	Location	Type	Completed	Date designated	Grid ref. Geo-coordinates	Notes	Entry number	Image	Wikidata
Worcester College, Main Block	I	Worcester College			12 January 1954	SP5094006489; 51°45′17″N 1°15′48″W		1184311	Worcester College, Main Block More images	Q17528594
Worcester College, Entrance screen and gates on Beaumont Street	I	Worcester College			28 June 1972	SP5095206504; 51°45′18″N 1°15′48″W		1184324	Worcester College, Entrance screen and gates on Beaumont Street More images	Q17528598
Worcester College, North Range	I	North Range, Worcester College			12 January 1954	SP5090506525; 51°45′18″N 1°15′50″W		1046605	Worcester College, North Range More images	Q17528283
Worcester College, South Range with Pump Quadrangle and Old Kitchen	I	Worcester College			12 January 1954	SP5092006474; 51°45′17″N 1°15′49″W		1046604	Worcester College, South Range with Pump Quadrangle and Old Kitchen	Q67152253
Worcester College, Walls in the College gardens	II	Worcester College			28 June 1972	SP5087406497; 51°45′17″N 1°15′52″W		1046607	Worcester College, Walls in the College gardens More images	Q26298767
Worcester College, Gateway on Walton Street to the north of the North Range	I	Worcester College			12 January 1954	SP5095006533; 51°45′19″N 1°15′48″W		1046608	Worcester College, Gateway on Walton Street to the north of the North Range More images	Q17528287
Worcester College, Boundary wall on Walton Street	II	Worcester College			28 June 1972	SP5094806569; 51°45′20″N 1°15′48″W		1184331	Worcester College, Boundary wall on Walton Street More images	Q26479656
Worcester College, Boundary wall on Worcester Street, stretching 60 yards south from the entrance block to the new gateway	II	Worcester College			28 June 1972	SP5094706439; 51°45′16″N 1°15′48″W		1184349	Worcester College, Boundary wall on Worcester Street, stretching 60 yards south from the entrance block to the new gateway	Q26479672
Worcester College, Gateway in the College garden to the south of the Pool	II	Worcester College			28 June 1972	SP5075306460; 51°45′16″N 1°15′58″W		1046606	Worcester College, Gateway in the College garden to the south of the Pool	Q26298766
Worcester Cottage	II	172, Walton Street			12 January 1954	SP5096906545; 51°45′19″N 1°15′47″W		1051618	Worcester Cottage	Q26303466

=== Outside colleges ===
Name	Grade	Location	Type	Completed	Date designated	Grid ref. Geo-coordinates	Notes	Entry number	Image	Wikidata
The Randolph Hotel	II	Beaumont Street			28 June 1972	SP5120006513; 51°45′18″N 1°15′35″W		1369325	The Randolph Hotel More images	Q6722985
Numbers 5-7, The Playhouse and Numbers 11-23	II*	11-23, Beaumont Street			12 January 1954	SP5111906502; 51°45′18″N 1°15′39″W		1185150	Numbers 5-7, The Playhouse and Numbers 11-23 More images	Q7115418
24-37, Beaumont Street	II*	24-37, Beaumont Street			12 January 1954	SP5106406525; 51°45′18″N 1°15′42″W		1047375	24-37, Beaumont Street More images	Q17548684
The Ashmolean Museum and The Taylor Institute	I	41, Beaumont Street			12 January 1954	SP5116806563; 51°45′20″N 1°15′36″W		1047111	The Ashmolean Museum and The Taylor Institute More images	Q62534106
Ashmolean Museum, Entrance screen and steps fronting Beaumont Street	I	Beaumont Street			28 June 1972	SP5117406541; 51°45′19″N 1°15′36″W		1047112	Ashmolean Museum, Entrance screen and steps fronting Beaumont Street	Q17528518
Numbers 15 and 16 and attached walls	II	15 and 16, Blackhall Road			15 July 1998	SP5127606870; 51°45′29″N 1°15′31″W		1375655	Numbers 15 and 16 and attached walls	Q26656418
Number 17 and attached walls	II	17, Blackhall Road			15 July 1998	SP5129006856; 51°45′29″N 1°15′30″W		1375656	Number 17 and attached walls	Q26656419
Christ Church Cathedral School	II	3, Brewer Street			28 June 1972	SP5133505920; 51°44′59″N 1°15′28″W		1047339	Christ Church Cathedral School More images	Q5108787
Christ Church Cathedral School rear boundary wall	II	Rose Place			28 June 1972	SP5132805882; 51°44′57″N 1°15′28″W		1369351	Christ Church Cathedral School rear boundary wall	Q26650702
Campion Hall (Including Chapel) Micklen Hall (Including Chapel)	II*	Brewer Street			12 January 1954	SP5131205936; 51°44′59″N 1°15′29″W		1046738	Campion Hall (Including Chapel) Micklen Hall (Including Chapel)	Q98167774
1 and 2, Brewer Street	II	1 and 2, Brewer Street			12 January 1954	SP5136805931; 51°44′59″N 1°15′26″W		1369350	1 and 2, Brewer Street	Q26650701
7, Brewer Street	II	7, Brewer Street			12 January 1954	SP5125505942; 51°44′59″N 1°15′32″W		1047340	7, Brewer Street	Q26299446
8, Brewer Street	II	8, Brewer Street			12 January 1954	SP5124705943; 51°44′59″N 1°15′33″W		1185289	8, Brewer Street	Q26480602
Carfax Tower (tower of the former Church of St Martin Carfax)	II	Carfax			12 January 1954	SP5130606178; 51°45′07″N 1°15′29″W		1047353	Carfax Tower (tower of the former Church of St Martin Carfax) More images	Q26299460
K2 Telephone Kiosk outside Carfax Tower	II	Carfax (Queen Street)			3 July 2009	SP5131006182; 51°45′07″N 1°15′29″W		1393364	K2 Telephone Kiosk outside Carfax Tower More images	Q26672534
29a, Castle Street	II	29a, Castle Street			18 March 1977	SP5105606066; 51°45′03″N 1°15′43″W		1369468	29a, Castle Street	Q26650799
Church of St Ebbe	II*	Penny Farthing Place			12 January 1954	SP5120306024; 51°45′02″N 1°15′35″W		1047355	Church of St Ebbe More images	Q7592988
Churchyard wall of the Church of St Ebbe	II	St Ebbe's Street			28 June 1972	SP5121906010; 51°45′02″N 1°15′34″W		1047356	Churchyard wall of the Church of St Ebbe	Q26299462
7, Clarkes Row	II	7, Clarkes Row			28 June 1972	SP5133105872; 51°44′57″N 1°15′28″W		1185626	7, Clarkes Row	Q26480939
Church of St Michael at the Northgate	I	Cornmarket Street			12 January 1954	SP5128906375; 51°45′13″N 1°15′30″W		1185714	Church of St Michael at the Northgate More images	Q7594875
Screen and gates of the Church of St Michael	II	Cornmarket Street			28 June 1972	SP5127106376; 51°45′13″N 1°15′31″W		1047326	Screen and gates of the Church of St Michael	Q26299431
Lloyds Bank	II	1, Cornmarket Street			28 June 1972	SP5134306198; 51°45′08″N 1°15′27″W		1369375	Lloyds Bank More images	Q26650719
3, Cornmarket Street	II*	3, Cornmarket Street			12 January 1954	SP5134006215; 51°45′08″N 1°15′28″W		1185643	3, Cornmarket Street	Q17548740
The Golden Cross Hotel	I	5, Cornmarket Street			12 January 1954	SP5134406238; 51°45′09″N 1°15′27″W		1047323	The Golden Cross Hotel More images	Q5579300
8-10, Cornmarket Street	II	8-10, Cornmarket Street			28 June 1972	SP5132106258; 51°45′10″N 1°15′29″W		1047324	8-10, Cornmarket Street	Q26299429
23, Cornmarket Street	II	23, Cornmarket Street			12 January 1954	SP5129206330; 51°45′12″N 1°15′30″W		1185685	23, Cornmarket Street	Q26480994
26 and 27, Cornmarket Street	II	26 and 27, Cornmarket Street			12 January 1954	SP5128606344; 51°45′12″N 1°15′30″W		1047325	26 and 27, Cornmarket Street More images	Q26299430
28, Cornmarket Street	II	28, Cornmarket Street			12 January 1954	SP5128406350; 51°45′13″N 1°15′30″W		1369341	28, Cornmarket Street More images	Q26650694
35, Cornmarket Street	II	35, Cornmarket Street			12 January 1954	SP5125306377; 51°45′13″N 1°15′32″W		1299550	35, Cornmarket Street	Q26586944
38, Cornmarket Street	II	38, Cornmarket Street			12 January 1954	SP5126106348; 51°45′13″N 1°15′32″W		1047327	38, Cornmarket Street More images	Q26299432
39, Cornmarket Street	II	39, Cornmarket Street			28 June 1972	SP5126306345; 51°45′12″N 1°15′32″W		1369342	39, Cornmarket Street More images	Q26650695
40, Cornmarket Street	II	40, Cornmarket Street			12 January 1954	SP5126406342; 51°45′12″N 1°15′32″W		1186051	40, Cornmarket Street More images	Q26481324
41 and 42, Cornmarket Street	II	41 and 42, Cornmarket Street			12 January 1954	SP5126606337; 51°45′12″N 1°15′31″W		1047328	41 and 42, Cornmarket Street More images	Q26299433
Midland Bank	II	64, Cornmarket Street			28 June 1972	SP5131406198; 51°45′08″N 1°15′29″W		1186063	Midland Bank More images	Q26481336
City of Oxford High School for Boys (former)	II	George Street			28 June 1972	SP5107606330; 51°45′12″N 1°15′41″W		1047304	City of Oxford High School for Boys (former) More images	Q26299410
Screen and gates of the (former) City of Oxford High School for Boys	II	George Street			28 June 1972	SP5107206348; 51°45′13″N 1°15′42″W		1116465	Screen and gates of the (former) City of Oxford High School for Boys	Q26410074
The Old School	II	Gloucester Green, OX1 2BU			28 June 1972	SP5099606461; 51°45′16″N 1°15′45″W		1047305	The Old School	Q26299411
1, Holywell Street	II	1, Holywell Street			12 January 1954	SP5191806508; 51°45′18″N 1°14′57″W		1047263	1, Holywell Street More images	Q26299367
2, Holywell Street	II	2, Holywell Street			12 January 1954	SP5190106508; 51°45′18″N 1°14′58″W		1186750	2, Holywell Street More images	Q26481989
3, Holywell Street	II	3, Holywell Street			12 January 1954	SP5188306511; 51°45′18″N 1°14′59″W		1369392	3, Holywell Street More images	Q26650735
4, Holywell Street	II	4, Holywell Street			12 January 1954	SP5187206513; 51°45′18″N 1°15′00″W		1047264	4, Holywell Street More images	Q26299369
5, Holywell Street	II	5, Holywell Street			12 January 1954	SP5186706515; 51°45′18″N 1°15′00″W		1186761	5, Holywell Street More images	Q26481999
6 and 7, Holywell Street	II	6 and 7, Holywell Street			12 January 1954	SP5185606517; 51°45′18″N 1°15′01″W		1047265	6 and 7, Holywell Street More images	Q26299370
Wall at Rear of Number 7	II	Holywell Street			28 June 1972	SP5184706537; 51°45′18″N 1°15′01″W		1299036	Upload Photo	Q26586466
Gatepiers between Numbers 7 and 8	II	Holywell Street			28 June 1972	SP5184006513; 51°45′18″N 1°15′01″W		1369393	Gatepiers between Numbers 7 and 8 More images	Q26650736
8, Holywell Street	II	8, Holywell Street			12 January 1954	SP5183406520; 51°45′18″N 1°15′02″W		1047266	8, Holywell Street More images	Q26299371
9, Holywell Street	II	9, Holywell Street			12 January 1954	SP5182806521; 51°45′18″N 1°15′02″W		1335832	9, Holywell Street More images	Q26620391
10 and 11, Holywell Street	II	10 and 11, Holywell Street			12 January 1954	SP5182306523; 51°45′18″N 1°15′02″W		1369394	10 and 11, Holywell Street More images	Q26650737
12, Holywell Street	II	12, Holywell Street			12 January 1954	SP5181406530; 51°45′18″N 1°15′03″W		1047267	12, Holywell Street More images	Q26299372
13 and 13a, Holywell Street	II	13 and 13a, Holywell Street			12 January 1954	SP5180806522; 51°45′18″N 1°15′03″W		1087113	13 and 13a, Holywell Street More images	Q26379586
14, Holywell Street	II	14, Holywell Street			12 January 1954	SP5179906524; 51°45′18″N 1°15′04″W		1369395	14, Holywell Street More images	Q26650738
15 and 16, Holywell Street	II	15 and 16, Holywell Street			12 January 1954	SP5179306524; 51°45′18″N 1°15′04″W		1047268	15 and 16, Holywell Street More images	Q26299373
17, Holywell Street	II	17, Holywell Street			12 January 1954	SP5178506524; 51°45′18″N 1°15′04″W		1087082	17, Holywell Street More images	Q26379559
18, Holywell Street	II	18, Holywell Street			12 January 1954	SP5177606525; 51°45′18″N 1°15′05″W		1047269	18, Holywell Street More images	Q26299374
19, Holywell Street	II	19, Holywell Street			12 January 1954	SP5176906532; 51°45′18″N 1°15′05″W		1087089	19, Holywell Street More images	Q26379566
20, Holywell Street	II	20, Holywell Street			12 January 1954	SP5176206532; 51°45′18″N 1°15′05″W		1369396	20, Holywell Street More images	Q26650739
24, Holywell Street	II	24, Holywell Street, Manchester College			12 January 1954	SP5173806532; 51°45′18″N 1°15′07″W		1087060	24, Holywell Street More images	Q26379542
25 Holywell Street	II	25, Holywell Street, Manchester College			12 January 1954	SP5173306532; 51°45′18″N 1°15′07″W		1047226	25 Holywell Street More images	Q26299332
26, Holywell Street	II	26, Holywell Street, Manchester College			12 January 1954	SP5172606533; 51°45′18″N 1°15′07″W		1369377	26, Holywell Street More images	Q26650721
27, Holywell Street	II	27, Holywell Street, Manchester College			12 January 1954	SP5171906534; 51°45′18″N 1°15′08″W		1047227	27, Holywell Street More images	Q26299333
28, Holywell Street	II	28, Holywell Street, Manchester College			12 January 1954	SP5171106533; 51°45′18″N 1°15′08″W		1047228	28, Holywell Street More images	Q26299334
29 and 29a, Holywell Street	II	29 and 29a, Holywell Street, Manchester College			12 January 1954	SP5170006536; 51°45′18″N 1°15′09″W		1369378	29 and 29a, Holywell Street More images	Q26650722
30, Holywell Street	II	30, Holywell Street			12 January 1954	SP5169206536; 51°45′18″N 1°15′09″W		1047229	30, Holywell Street More images	Q26299336
31, Holywell Street	II	31, Holywell Street			12 January 1954	SP5168606535; 51°45′18″N 1°15′09″W		1369379	31, Holywell Street More images	Q26650723
32, Holywell Street	II	32, Holywell Street			12 January 1954	SP5167406537; 51°45′19″N 1°15′10″W		1047230	32, Holywell Street More images	Q26299338
33, Holywell Street	II	33, Holywell Street			12 January 1954	SP5166206536; 51°45′19″N 1°15′11″W		1047231	33, Holywell Street More images	Q26299339
Holywell Music Room	II*	34, Holywell Street			12 January 1954	SP5164406554; 51°45′19″N 1°15′12″W		1047232	Holywell Music Room More images	Q5887192
Screen walls Number 34 (Holywell Music Room)	II	Holywell Street			28 June 1972	SP5165306542; 51°45′19″N 1°15′11″W		1047233	Screen walls Number 34 (Holywell Music Room)	Q26299340
35, Holywell Street	II*	35, Holywell Street			12 January 1954	SP5163006534; 51°45′18″N 1°15′12″W		1047234	35, Holywell Street More images	Q17548642
36, Holywell Street	II	36, Holywell Street			12 January 1954	SP5161506534; 51°45′18″N 1°15′13″W		1047235	36, Holywell Street More images	Q26299341
Wadham College Bursary	II	37, Holywell Street, Wadham College			12 January 1954	SP5160706532; 51°45′18″N 1°15′14″W		1335895	Wadham College Bursary More images	Q26620443
38, Holywell Street	II	38, Holywell Street			12 January 1954	SP5160306532; 51°45′18″N 1°15′14″W		1047236	38, Holywell Street More images	Q26299342
Former Blackwells Music Shop and attached buildings for Wadham College to rear	II	38, Holywell Street			4 December 2000	SP5159206543; 51°45′19″N 1°15′14″W		1246930	Former Blackwells Music Shop and attached buildings for Wadham College to rear	Q26539290
39, Holywell Street	II	39, Holywell Street			12 January 1954	SP5158506528; 51°45′18″N 1°15′15″W		1047237	39, Holywell Street More images	Q26299343
Kings Arms Hotel	II	40, Holywell Street			12 January 1954	SP5157006528; 51°45′18″N 1°15′15″W		1335897	Kings Arms Hotel More images	Q6410842
51 and 52, Holywell Street	II	51 and 52, Holywell Street			14 March 1969	SP5163006517; 51°45′18″N 1°15′12″W		1047238	51 and 52, Holywell Street More images	Q26299344
53-55, Holywell Street	II	53-55, Holywell Street			14 March 1969	SP5164306518; 51°45′18″N 1°15′12″W		1335887	53-55, Holywell Street More images	Q26620436
56, Holywell Street	II	56, Holywell Street			28 June 1972	SP5166306518; 51°45′18″N 1°15′11″W		1369380	56, Holywell Street More images	Q26650724
57, Holywell Street	II	57, Holywell Street			12 January 1954	SP5167006518; 51°45′18″N 1°15′10″W		1047239	57, Holywell Street More images	Q26299345
58, Holywell Street	II	58, Holywell Street			14 March 1969	SP5167706518; 51°45′18″N 1°15′10″W		1335918	58, Holywell Street More images	Q26620465
61 and 62, Holywell Street	II	61 and 62, Holywell Street			12 January 1954	SP5169306515; 51°45′18″N 1°15′09″W		1047240	61 and 62, Holywell Street More images	Q26299346
63 and 64, Holywell Street	II	63 and 64, Holywell Street			12 January 1954	SP5170106514; 51°45′18″N 1°15′09″W		1104929	63 and 64, Holywell Street More images	Q26398890
65, Holywell Street	II	65, Holywell Street			12 January 1954	SP5170706514; 51°45′18″N 1°15′08″W		1369381	65, Holywell Street More images	Q26650725
68, Holywell Street	II	68, Holywell Street			12 January 1954	SP5172306516; 51°45′18″N 1°15′07″W		1047241	68, Holywell Street More images	Q26299347
96-98, Holywell Street	II	96-98, Holywell Street			12 January 1954	SP5188306492; 51°45′17″N 1°14′59″W		1104897	96-98, Holywell Street	Q26398859
99, Holywell Street	II	99, Holywell Street			12 January 1954	SP5190106490; 51°45′17″N 1°14′58″W		1369382	99, Holywell Street	Q26650726
100, Holywell Street	II	100, Holywell Street			12 January 1954	SP5191406486; 51°45′17″N 1°14′58″W		1047242	100, Holywell Street More images	Q26299348
K6 Telephone Kiosk, Jowett Walk	II	Jowett Walk			29 April 1988	SP5188006574; 51°45′20″N 1°14′59″W		1047083	K6 Telephone Kiosk, Jowett Walk	Q26299196
10, Littlegate Street	II	10, Littlegate Street			12 January 1954	SP5120605830; 51°44′56″N 1°15′35″W		1047206	10, Littlegate Street	Q26299309
Holy Trinity Vicarage	II	15, Littlegate Street / 19, Turn Again Lane			12 January 1954	SP5120505923; 51°44′59″N 1°15′35″W		1369408	Holy Trinity Vicarage	Q26650750
Holy Trinity Vicarage garden wall	II	15, Littlegate Street			28 June 1972	SP5121005906; 51°44′58″N 1°15′35″W		1047207	Holy Trinity Vicarage garden wall	Q26299310
Church of St Mary Magdalen	I	Magdalen Street			12 January 1954	SP5125806471; 51°45′17″N 1°15′32″W		1047218	Church of St Mary Magdalen More images	Q7594567
MGM Cinema, now The Oxford Cinema & Cafe	II	Magdalen Street			25 November 1994	SP5118206476; 51°45′17″N 1°15′36″W		1230655	MGM Cinema, now The Oxford Cinema & Cafe	Q26524318
The Martyrs Memorial	II*	Magdalen Street			12 January 1954	SP5124506525; 51°45′18″N 1°15′32″W		1107172	The Martyrs Memorial More images	Q11125244
University Of Oxford, St Cross Building	II*	St Cross Building, Manor Road			30 March 1993	SP5200906758; 51°45′26″N 1°14′52″W		1369496	University Of Oxford, St Cross Building	Q17548824
Merton College Sports Pavilion	II	Manor Road			14 October 2014	SP5238706723; 51°45′24″N 1°14′33″W		1419922	Merton College Sports Pavilion	Q26676765
Queen Elizabeth House (Department of International Development - formerly School of Geography)	II	3, Mansfield Road			28 June 1972	SP5177306604; 51°45′21″N 1°15′05″W		1107880	Queen Elizabeth House (Department of International Development - formerly School of Geography)	Q26401669
9, Mansfield Road (The King's Mound)	II	9, Mansfield Road			28 June 1972	SP5177806720; 51°45′24″N 1°15′05″W		1047221	9, Mansfield Road (The King's Mound)	Q26299326
Girls' Central School (now St Peter's College, Chavasse Building)	II	New Inn Hall Street			28 June 1972	SP5115906201; 51°45′08″N 1°15′37″W		1047198	Girls' Central School (now St Peter's College, Chavasse Building)	Q15262061
Gateway to (former) Girls' Central School	II	New Inn Hall Street			28 June 1972	SP5116506206; 51°45′08″N 1°15′37″W		1121520	Gateway to (former) Girls' Central School	Q26414686
Frewin Hall	II*	New Inn Hall Street			12 January 1954	SP5119806270; 51°45′10″N 1°15′35″W		1122646	Frewin Hall	Q17548719
Garden Wall at Frewin fronting Shoe Lane	II	New Inn Hall Street			29 January 1968	SP5121106213; 51°45′08″N 1°15′34″W		1369404	Garden Wall at Frewin fronting Shoe Lane	Q26650746
Wesley Memorial Methodist Church	II	New Inn Hall Street			28 June 1972	SP5112106296; 51°45′11″N 1°15′39″W		1047199	Wesley Memorial Methodist Church More images	Q7983965
1, New Inn Hall Street	II	1, New Inn Hall Street			12 January 1954	SP5117406169; 51°45′07″N 1°15′36″W		1322990	1, New Inn Hall Street	Q26608752
5, New Inn Hall Street	II	5, New Inn Hall Street			28 June 1972	SP5117206183; 51°45′07″N 1°15′36″W		1369402	5, New Inn Hall Street	Q26650744
20, New Inn Hall Street	II	20, New Inn Hall Street			28 June 1972	SP5117406215; 51°45′08″N 1°15′36″W		1322814	20, New Inn Hall Street	Q26608598
22 and 24, New Inn Hall Street	II	22 and 24, New Inn Hall Street			12 January 1954	SP5117306221; 51°45′08″N 1°15′36″W		1369403	22 and 24, New Inn Hall Street	Q26650745
32 and 34, New Inn Hall Street	II	32 and 34, New Inn Hall Street			12 January 1954	SP5116806236; 51°45′09″N 1°15′37″W		1047200	32 and 34, New Inn Hall Street	Q26299303
New Road Baptist Chapel	II	Bonn Square, New Road			12 January 1954	SP5115506169; 51°45′07″N 1°15′37″W		1047202	New Road Baptist Chapel More images	Q26299304
Oxfordshire Light Infantry Memorial	II	Bonn Square, New Road			28 June 1972	SP5117706154; 51°45′06″N 1°15′36″W		1338518	Oxfordshire Light Infantry Memorial More images	Q7809085
County Hall with the Curving Screen Walls and Turrets on Either Side	II*	New Road			29 January 1968	SP5105306158; 51°45′06″N 1°15′43″W		1047201	County Hall with the Curving Screen Walls and Turrets on Either Side More images	Q17548636
Screen and Gateways of County Hall fronting New Road	II	New Road			28 June 1972	SP5106806177; 51°45′07″N 1°15′42″W		1338533	Screen and Gateways of County Hall fronting New Road	Q26622848
St Georges Tower, St Georges Chapel Crypt and Prison D Wing including the Debtors Tower	I	Oxford Castle Quarter, New Road			12 January 1954	SP5095406139; 51°45′06″N 1°15′48″W		1369490	St Georges Tower, St Georges Chapel Crypt and Prison D Wing including the Debtors Tower More images	Q96122948
C Wing of Prison ncluding the Round Tower	II*	Oxford Castle Quarter, New Road			28 June 1972	SP5100206087; 51°45′04″N 1°15′45″W		1047045	C Wing of Prison ncluding the Round Tower More images	Q17548518
Former Houses of Correction and attached Carpenters Shop	II	Oxford Castle Quarter, New Road			18 February 1993	SP5096606112; 51°45′05″N 1°15′47″W		1369491	Former Houses of Correction and attached Carpenters Shop More images	Q26650820
Front Range with Entrance including Prison Wing and link to Wing with former Chapel	II	Oxford Castle Quarter, New Road			18 February 1993	SP5100306133; 51°45′06″N 1°15′45″W		1369492	Front Range with Entrance including Prison Wing and link to Wing with former Chapel More images	Q26650821
Boundary Wall, Oxford Prison	II	Oxford Castle Quarter, New Road			28 June 1972	SP5096506092; 51°45′04″N 1°15′47″W		1047046	Boundary Wall, Oxford Prison More images	Q26299160
The Governors House, Oxford Prison	II	Oxford Castle Quarter, New Road			18 February 1993	SP5100206161; 51°45′07″N 1°15′45″W		1047047	The Governors House, Oxford Prison More images	Q26299161
The Governors Office and former Laundry, Oxford Prison	II	Oxford Castle Quarter, New Road			18 February 1993	SP5104006108; 51°45′05″N 1°15′43″W		1047048	The Governors Office and former Laundry, Oxford Prison More images	Q26299162
Well House, Oxford Castle	I	Oxford Castle Quarter, New Road			12 January 1954	SP5096706199; 51°45′08″N 1°15′47″W		1369493	Well House, Oxford Castle More images	Q96122946
St Ebbe's Rectory	II	Paradise Square			28 June 1972	SP5099605992; 51°45′01″N 1°15′46″W		1047175	St Ebbe's Rectory More images	Q26299279
Swan Bridge	II	Paradise Street			28 June 1972	SP5093106086; 51°45′04″N 1°15′49″W		1047176	Swan Bridge More images	Q7653425
The Jolly Farmers Inn Public House	II	Paradise Street			12 January 1954	SP5099706037; 51°45′03″N 1°15′46″W		1111745	The Jolly Farmers Inn Public House More images	Q26405543
Greyfriars	II*	21, Paradise Street			12 January 1954	SP5101806037; 51°45′03″N 1°15′45″W		1369431	Greyfriars	Q17548804
Inorganic Chemistry Laboratory (old Chemistry Department)	II	Parks Road			12 January 1954	SP5148406870; 51°45′29″N 1°15′20″W		1369432	Inorganic Chemistry Laboratory (old Chemistry Department) More images	Q26650770
Museum Lodge	II	Parks Road			28 June 1972	SP5139106981; 51°45′33″N 1°15′25″W		1047178	Museum Lodge More images	Q26299281
School of Agricultural Science	II	Parks Road			12 January 1954	SP5142106801; 51°45′27″N 1°15′23″W		1369433	School of Agricultural Science More images	Q26650771
Stone on the west side of Parks Road opposite Wadham Cottage	II	Parks Road			28 June 1972	SP5146806700; 51°45′24″N 1°15′21″W		1046586	Stone on the west side of Parks Road opposite Wadham Cottage More images	Q26298747
The Townsend Building	II	Parks Road			31 October 2008	SP5142607012; 51°45′34″N 1°15′23″W		1392967	The Townsend Building More images	Q26672163
The University Museum and Pitt Rivers Museum	I	Parks Road			12 January 1954	SP5148306927; 51°45′31″N 1°15′20″W		1081534	The University Museum and Pitt Rivers Museum More images	Q128598765
Wadham Cottage	II	1 and 2, Parks Road			12 January 1954	SP5148606714; 51°45′24″N 1°15′20″W		1047177	Wadham Cottage More images	Q26299280
Mathematical, Physical And Life Sciences Division (University Of Oxford)	II	9, Parks Road, OX1 3PD			28 June 1972	SP5140906813; 51°45′28″N 1°15′24″W		1081516	Mathematical, Physical And Life Sciences Division (University Of Oxford) More images	Q26356964
K6 Telephone Kiosk, Pembroke Street	II	Pembroke Street			26 April 1988	SP5134306031; 51°45′02″N 1°15′28″W		1047084	K6 Telephone Kiosk, Pembroke Street More images	Q26299197
11, Pembroke Street	II	11, Pembroke Street			12 January 1954	SP5133306021; 51°45′02″N 1°15′28″W		1349042	11, Pembroke Street	Q26632366
12, Pembroke Street	II	12, Pembroke Street			28 June 1972	SP5132506023; 51°45′02″N 1°15′28″W		1369434	12, Pembroke Street	Q26650772
13 and 14, Pembroke Street	II*	13 and 14, Pembroke Street			12 January 1954	SP5131806023; 51°45′02″N 1°15′29″W		1099196	13 and 14, Pembroke Street	Q17548713
28, Pembroke Street	II	28, Pembroke Street			28 June 1972	SP5123806032; 51°45′02″N 1°15′33″W		1047181	28, Pembroke Street	Q26299284
36 and 37, Pembroke Street	II	36 and 37, Pembroke Street			12 January 1954	SP5128606041; 51°45′03″N 1°15′31″W		1349032	36 and 37, Pembroke Street	Q26632355
38, Pembroke Street	II*	38, Pembroke Street			12 January 1954	SP5129306040; 51°45′03″N 1°15′30″W		1369435	38, Pembroke Street	Q17548808
39, Pembroke Street	II	39, Pembroke Street			12 January 1954	SP5129906042; 51°45′03″N 1°15′30″W		1047182	39, Pembroke Street	Q26299285
43 and 44, Pembroke Street	II	43 and 44, Pembroke Street			28 June 1972	SP5134706037; 51°45′02″N 1°15′27″W		1099209	43 and 44, Pembroke Street	Q26391363
45, Pembroke Street	II	45, Pembroke Street			12 January 1954	SP5135506032; 51°45′02″N 1°15′27″W		1047183	45, Pembroke Street	Q26299287
Tower House	II	45, Queen Street			28 June 1972	SP5130106175; 51°45′07″N 1°15′30″W		1047184	Tower House	Q26299288
1, Savile Road	II	1, Savile Road			5 June 1989	SP5168606680; 51°45′23″N 1°15′09″W		1047085	1, Savile Road	Q26299198
Boundary wall of Rhodes House fronting South Parks Road and Parks Road	II	South Parks Road			12 January 1954	SP5145306788; 51°45′27″N 1°15′21″W		1369474	Boundary wall of Rhodes House fronting South Parks Road and Parks Road More images	Q26650805
Dyson Perrins Chemistry Laboratory	II	South Parks Road			3 October 2001	SP5160206941; 51°45′32″N 1°15′14″W		1389444	Dyson Perrins Chemistry Laboratory	Q5319502
Footbridge over River Cherwell at Parsons Pleasure punt rollers	II	South Parks Road			29 May 1998	SP5213307084; 51°45′36″N 1°14′46″W		1119763	Footbridge over River Cherwell at Parsons Pleasure punt rollers	Q26413056
Radcliffe Science Library / Reuben College	II	Parks Road / South Parks Road			12 January 1954	SP5146506843; 51°45′29″N 1°15′21″W		1047093	Radcliffe Science Library / Reuben College More images	Q99937407
Rhodes House	II*	South Parks Road			12 January 1954	SP5151906809; 51°45′27″N 1°15′18″W		1076964	Rhodes House More images	Q3429605
1, South Parks Road	II	1, South Parks Road			15 September 2004	SP5157806847; 51°45′29″N 1°15′15″W		1391088	1, South Parks Road More images	Q26670455
2, South Parks Road	II	2, South Parks Road			15 September 2004	SP5160606861; 51°45′29″N 1°15′13″W		1391089	2, South Parks Road	Q26670456
Church of St Aldate	II*	St Aldate's			12 January 1954	SP5135505999; 51°45′01″N 1°15′27″W		1100244	Church of St Aldate More images	Q7592293
6 and 7, St Aldate's Street	II	6 and 7, St Aldate's			12 January 1954	SP5138606094; 51°45′04″N 1°15′25″W		1100339	6 and 7, St Aldate's Street	Q26392470
8, St Aldate's Street	II	8, St Aldate's			12 January 1954	SP5138806084; 51°45′04″N 1°15′25″W		1369421	8, St Aldate's Street	Q26650761
82 and 83, St Aldate's Street	II*	82 and 83, St Aldate's			12 January 1954	SP5140405834; 51°44′56″N 1°15′24″W		1047154	82 and 83, St Aldate's Street More images	Q17548598
84, St Aldate's Street	II	84, St Aldate's			12 January 1954	SP5139805847; 51°44′56″N 1°15′25″W		1047155	84, St Aldate's Street More images	Q26299258
85, St Aldate's Street	II	85, St Aldate's			12 January 1954	SP5140105855; 51°44′57″N 1°15′25″W		1100336	85, St Aldate's Street	Q26392464
The Old Palace, Bishop Kings Palace	I	86 and 87, St Aldate's			12 January 1954	SP5139905861; 51°44′57″N 1°15′25″W		1369422	The Old Palace, Bishop Kings Palace	Q17528764
88, St Aldate's Street	II	88, St Aldate's			28 June 1972	SP5139405881; 51°44′57″N 1°15′25″W		1047156	88, St Aldate's Street	Q26299259
Wall of Number 88 fronting Rose Place	II	St Aldate's			28 June 1972	SP5138205875; 51°44′57″N 1°15′26″W		1100279	Wall of Number 88 fronting Rose Place	Q26392370
89, St Aldate's Street	II	89, St Aldate's			12 January 1954	SP5139205893; 51°44′58″N 1°15′25″W		1369423	Upload Photo	Q26650762
90, St Aldate's Street	II	90, St Aldate's			28 June 1972	SP5139205902; 51°44′58″N 1°15′25″W		1348522	Upload Photo	Q26631898
91, St Aldate's Street	II	91, St Aldate's			12 January 1954	SP5139205911; 51°44′58″N 1°15′25″W		1047157	91, St Aldate's Street	Q26299260
92, St Aldate's Street	II	92, St Aldate's			12 January 1954	SP5139205919; 51°44′59″N 1°15′25″W		1047158	92, St Aldate's Street	Q26299262
98, St Aldate's Street	II	98, St Aldate's			12 January 1954	SP5136806046; 51°45′03″N 1°15′26″W		1369424	98, St Aldate's Street	Q26650763
107, St Aldate's Street	II	107, St Aldate's			26 April 2017	SP5135406095; 51°45′04″N 1°15′27″W		1445689	107, St Aldate's Street	Q66478730
Town Hall, Municipal Buildings and former Public Library	II*	St Aldate's			12 January 1954	SP5137906136; 51°45′06″N 1°15′26″W		1047153	Town Hall, Municipal Buildings and former Public Library More images	Q7115474
Wharf House (north west wing only)	II	St Aldate's			1 December 1971	SP5145505608; 51°44′49″N 1°15′22″W		1348481	Wharf House (north west wing only)	Q26631858
St Cross School (former)	II	St Cross Annexe, 10 St Cross Road			28 June 1972	SP5199906596; 51°45′20″N 1°14′53″W		1047130	St Cross School (former) More images	Q1247550
Church of St Cross	I	St Cross Road			12 January 1954	SP5201406657; 51°45′22″N 1°14′52″W		1369450	Church of St Cross More images	Q7592896
Churchyard wall of the Church of St Cross	II	St Cross Road			28 June 1972	SP5197706618; 51°45′21″N 1°14′54″W		1047131	Churchyard wall of the Church of St Cross	Q26299241
Holywell Cottage	II	St Cross Road			12 January 1954	SP5192706539; 51°45′19″N 1°14′57″W		1047129	Holywell Cottage More images	Q26299240
Holywell Manor	II	St Cross Road			12 January 1954	SP5203006696; 51°45′24″N 1°14′51″W		1047132	Holywell Manor More images	Q5887195
Church of St Giles	I	St Giles'			12 January 1954	SP5113906982; 51°45′33″N 1°15′38″W		1047140	Church of St Giles More images	Q7593264
Oxford War Memorial	II	St Giles', OX2 6HT			5 December 2016	SP5116106883; 51°45′30″N 1°15′37″W		1440081	Oxford War Memorial More images	Q66478189
1, St Giles Street	II	1, St Giles'			12 January 1954	SP5125706574; 51°45′20″N 1°15′32″W		1369451	1, St Giles Street	Q26650784
K6 Telephone Kiosk adjacent to St Johns College (West Block), St Giles	II	St Giles', OX1 3JP			6 May 2020	SP5122006724; 51°45′25″N 1°15′34″W		1469714	K6 Telephone Kiosk adjacent to St Johns College (West Block), St Giles More images	Q97467152
Middleton Hall	II	11, St Giles'			12 January 1954	SP5122306766; 51°45′26″N 1°15′33″W		1047133	Middleton Hall More images	Q26299242
North garden wall at rear of Number 11	II	St Giles'			12 January 1954	SP5123606779; 51°45′27″N 1°15′33″W		1369452	North garden wall at rear of Number 11	Q26650785
Lamb and Flag Inn	II	12, St Giles'			12 January 1954	SP5122106782; 51°45′27″N 1°15′34″W		1338861	Lamb and Flag Inn More images	Q82455
13, St Giles Street	II	13, St Giles'			12 January 1954	SP5121706786; 51°45′27″N 1°15′34″W		1047134	13, St Giles Street More images	Q26299243
14, St Giles Street	II	14, St Giles'			12 January 1954	SP5121606792; 51°45′27″N 1°15′34″W		1369453	14, St Giles Street More images	Q26650786
15, St Giles Street	II	15, St Giles'			28 June 1972	SP5121406800; 51°45′27″N 1°15′34″W		1084344	15, St Giles Street More images	Q26367986
Flanking walls and gateway of the driveway to St Giles' House, being the north garden wall of Number 15 and the south garden wall of Number 16	II	St Giles'			28 June 1972	SP5124306819; 51°45′28″N 1°15′32″W		1047135	Flanking walls and gateway of the driveway to St Giles' House, being the north garden wall of Number 15 and the south garden wall of Number 16 More images	Q26299244
St Giles' House (former Judges Lodging)	II*	16, St Giles'			12 January 1954	SP5121206821; 51°45′28″N 1°15′34″W		1047136	St Giles' House (former Judges Lodging) More images	Q17548562
Gates and piers at Number 16	II*	St Giles'			28 June 1972	SP5119806817; 51°45′28″N 1°15′35″W		1359647	Gates and piers at Number 16 More images	Q17548774
Garden house in back garden of Number 16 (St Giles' House)	II*	St Giles'			27 July 1989	SP5125506836; 51°45′28″N 1°15′32″W		1047042	Upload Photo	Q17548505
17, St Giles Street	II	17, St Giles'			28 June 1972	SP5120706836; 51°45′28″N 1°15′34″W		1369454	17, St Giles Street More images	Q26650787
19, St Giles Street	II	19, St Giles'			28 June 1972	SP5120506843; 51°45′29″N 1°15′34″W		1047137	19, St Giles Street	Q26299245
20, St Giles Street	II	20, St Giles'			12 January 1954	SP5120006853; 51°45′29″N 1°15′35″W		1063708	20, St Giles Street	Q26317005
Black Hall	II	St Giles'			12 January 1954	SP5119906880; 51°45′30″N 1°15′35″W		1369455	Black Hall	Q26650788
Wall and piers of Black Hall to the south of the building	II	St Giles'			28 June 1972	SP5119206863; 51°45′29″N 1°15′35″W		1065706	Wall and piers of Black Hall to the south of the building	Q26318753
Boundary wall of Black Hall fronting Black Hall Road	II				28 June 1972	SP5126306903; 51°45′31″N 1°15′31″W		1047138	Boundary wall of Black Hall fronting Black Hall Road More images	Q26299246
Part of Queen Elizabeth House adjoining number 22 to the south	II	St Giles'			28 June 1972	SP5118806908; 51°45′31″N 1°15′35″W		1047139	Part of Queen Elizabeth House adjoining number 22 to the south More images	Q26299247
22 and 23, St Giles Street	II	22 and 23, St Giles'			12 January 1954	SP5118806916; 51°45′31″N 1°15′35″W		1065714	22 and 23, St Giles Street More images	Q26318759
30, St Giles Street	II	30, St Giles'			12 January 1954	SP5119206967; 51°45′33″N 1°15′35″W		1369456	30, St Giles Street More images	Q26650789
31, St Giles Street	II	31, St Giles'			12 January 1954	SP5109706929; 51°45′31″N 1°15′40″W		1068551	31, St Giles Street More images	Q26321257
32, St Giles Street	II	32, St Giles'			28 June 1972	SP5109906921; 51°45′31″N 1°15′40″W		1369417	32, St Giles Street More images	Q26650757
33 and 33a, St Giles Street	II	33 and 33a, St Giles'			28 June 1972	SP5110206914; 51°45′31″N 1°15′40″W		1068561	33 and 33a, St Giles Street More images	Q26321266
34-36, St Giles Street	II	34-36, St Giles'			28 June 1972	SP5110806899; 51°45′30″N 1°15′39″W		1047141	34-36, St Giles Street More images	Q26299248
37, St Giles Street	II	37, St Giles'			12 January 1954	SP5111506879; 51°45′30″N 1°15′39″W		1047142	37, St Giles Street More images	Q26299249
37a, St Giles Street	II	37a, St Giles'			12 January 1954	SP5112006864; 51°45′29″N 1°15′39″W		1068569	37a, St Giles Street More images	Q26321274
38 and 39, St Giles Street	II	38 and 39, St Giles'			28 June 1972	SP5112406847; 51°45′29″N 1°15′39″W		1369418	38 and 39, St Giles Street More images	Q26650758
39a, St Giles Street	II	39a, St Giles'			28 June 1972	SP5113006832; 51°45′28″N 1°15′38″W		1047143	39a, St Giles Street More images	Q26299250
40, St Giles Street	II*	40, St Giles'			12 January 1954	SP5112706816; 51°45′28″N 1°15′38″W		1068575	40, St Giles Street More images	Q17548703
41, St Giles Street	II*	41, St Giles'			12 January 1954	SP5113806808; 51°45′27″N 1°15′38″W		1047144	41, St Giles Street More images	Q17548574
42, St Giles Street	II	42, St Giles'			28 June 1972	SP5113906801; 51°45′27″N 1°15′38″W		1068618	42, St Giles Street More images	Q26321318
Stone Outside Number 42 St Giles Street	II	St Giles'			28 June 1972	SP5114606806; 51°45′27″N 1°15′37″W		1046585	Stone Outside Number 42 St Giles Street More images	Q26298746
43, St Giles Street	II	43, St Giles'			12 January 1954	SP5114206792; 51°45′27″N 1°15′38″W		1047145	43, St Giles Street More images	Q26299252
44, St Giles Street	II	44, St Giles'			28 June 1972	SP5114506785; 51°45′27″N 1°15′37″W		1068622	44, St Giles Street More images	Q26321322
45 and 46, St Giles Street	II	45 and 46, St Giles'			28 June 1972	SP5114706776; 51°45′26″N 1°15′37″W		1047146	45 and 46, St Giles Street More images	Q26299253
The Eagle and Child Public House	II	49, St Giles'			12 January 1954	SP5114206760; 51°45′26″N 1°15′38″W		1047147	The Eagle and Child Public House More images	Q82190
50 and 51, St Giles Street	II	50 and 51, St Giles'			12 January 1954	SP5115206754; 51°45′26″N 1°15′37″W		1047106	50 and 51, St Giles Street More images	Q26299219
52, St Giles Street	II	52, St Giles'			12 January 1954	SP5115306749; 51°45′26″N 1°15′37″W		1047107	52, St Giles Street More images	Q26299220
53 and 54, St Giles Street	II*	53 and 54, St Giles'			12 January 1954	SP5115406743; 51°45′25″N 1°15′37″W		1369439	53 and 54, St Giles Street More images	Q17548813
55, St Giles Street	II	55, St Giles'			28 June 1972	SP5115606733; 51°45′25″N 1°15′37″W		1047108	55, St Giles Street More images	Q26299221
56, St Giles Street	II	56, St Giles'			28 June 1972	SP5115406722; 51°45′25″N 1°15′37″W		1369440	56, St Giles Street More images	Q26650776
Blackfriars	II	St Giles			4 August 2000	SP5115106648; 51°45′22″N 1°15′37″W		1380933	Blackfriars More images	Q26661086
Boundary Wall of Blackfriars on Pusey Lane	II				28 June 1972	SP5109706629; 51°45′22″N 1°15′40″W		1369441	Upload Photo	Q26650777
65, St Giles	II	65, St Giles			12 March 2001	SP5118706630; 51°45′22″N 1°15′35″W		1246866	65, St Giles	Q26539231
66 and 67, St Giles	II	66 and 67, St Giles			30 April 1984	SP5117706613; 51°45′21″N 1°15′36″W		1047078	66 and 67, St Giles More images	Q26299190
Extension of the Taylor Institute	II	St Giles'			12 January 1954	SP5119506593; 51°45′21″N 1°15′35″W		1369442	Extension of the Taylor Institute More images	Q26650778
Nos. 2 to 63, St John Street and 5, Pusey Street	II	2-33, St John Street			28 June 1972	SP5103806641; 51°45′22″N 1°15′43″W		1047113	Nos. 2 to 63, St John Street and 5, Pusey Street	Q26299223
Oxford Union Society Debating Hall	II*	St Michael's Street			29 January 1968	SP5119306301; 51°45′11″N 1°15′35″W		1047115	Oxford Union Society Debating Hall More images	Q26263406
Oxford Union Society Main Block	II*	St Michael's Street			29 January 1968	SP5123406296; 51°45′11″N 1°15′33″W		1369445	Oxford Union Society Main Block	Q26263528
Oxford Union Society New Buildings Oxford Union Society Steward's House	II	St Michael's Street			29 January 1968	SP5122606333; 51°45′12″N 1°15′33″W		1068800	Oxford Union Society New Buildings Oxford Union Society Steward's House	Q26321493
Oxford Union Society Old Library	II*	St Michael's Street			12 January 1954	SP5122406282; 51°45′10″N 1°15′34″W		1068789	Oxford Union Society Old Library	Q26263415
Wall of the Oxford Union Society fronting St Michael's Street	II	St Michael's Street			28 June 1972	SP5120606330; 51°45′12″N 1°15′35″W		1047116	Wall of the Oxford Union Society fronting St Michael's Street More images	Q26299225
4 and 6, St Michael's Street	II	4 and 6, St Michael's Street			12 January 1954	SP5124406357; 51°45′13″N 1°15′33″W		1369446	4 and 6, St Michael's Street More images	Q26650780
8, St Michael's Street	II	8, St Michael's Street			12 January 1954	SP5123806355; 51°45′13″N 1°15′33″W		1047118	8, St Michael's Street More images	Q26299227
10, St Michaels Street	II	10, St Michael's Street			29 January 1968	SP5123206354; 51°45′13″N 1°15′33″W		1068863	10, St Michaels Street	Q26321558
11, St Michael's Street	II	11, St Michael's Street			29 January 1968	SP5117706315; 51°45′12″N 1°15′36″W		1047117	11, St Michael's Street More images	Q26299226
17 and 19, St Michael's Street	II	17 and 19, St Michael's Street			29 January 1968	SP5115606307; 51°45′11″N 1°15′37″W		1343682	17 and 19, St Michael's Street More images	Q26627463
The North Gate Hall	II	18, St Michael's Street			28 June 1972	SP5120906348; 51°45′13″N 1°15′34″W		1369447	The North Gate Hall More images	Q7059448
Vanburgh House	II*	20, St Michael's Street			12 January 1954	SP5119406340; 51°45′12″N 1°15′35″W		1068871	Vanburgh House	Q17548708
22, St Michael's Street	II	22, St Michael's Street			12 January 1954	SP5119106339; 51°45′12″N 1°15′35″W		1047119	22, St Michael's Street	Q26299229
24, St Michael's Street	II	24, St Michael's Street			12 January 1954	SP5118106336; 51°45′12″N 1°15′36″W		1369448	24, St Michael's Street More images	Q26650782
26, St Michael's Street	II	26, St Michael's Street			28 June 1972	SP5115806327; 51°45′12″N 1°15′37″W		1068881	26, St Michael's Street	Q26321573
Bastion 2	II	28-32, St Michael's Street			28 June 1972	SP5115006322; 51°45′12″N 1°15′37″W		1047120	Bastion 2	Q26299230
34 and 36, St Michael's Street	II	34 and 36, St Michael's Street			28 June 1972	SP5113806317; 51°45′12″N 1°15′38″W		1047121	34 and 36, St Michael's Street	Q26299231
8, Turn Again Lane	II	8, Turn Again Lane, OX1 1QL			12 January 1954	SP5117005951; 51°45′00″N 1°15′37″W		1185503	8, Turn Again Lane	Q26480821
9, Turn Again Lane	II	9, Turn Again Lane, OX1 1QL			22 January 1970	SP5117805948; 51°45′00″N 1°15′36″W		1047354	9, Turn Again Lane	Q26299461
10, Turn Again Lane	II	10, Turn Again Lane, OX1 1QL			22 January 1970	SP5118605946; 51°45′00″N 1°15′36″W		1299655	10, Turn Again Lane	Q26587030
1, 1a and 2, Walton Street	II	1, 1a and 2, Walton Street			28 June 1972	SP5094206605; 51°45′21″N 1°15′48″W		1051060	1, 1a and 2, Walton Street	Q26302979
4-15, Walton Street	II	4-15, Walton Street			28 June 1972	SP5092906706; 51°45′24″N 1°15′49″W		1047101	4-15, Walton Street	Q26299214
Ruskin College (1913 Building - now Exeter College Cohen Quad)	II	Walton Street			22 April 2013	SP5093106651; 51°45′22″N 1°15′49″W		1412747	Ruskin College (1913 Building - now Exeter College Cohen Quad) More images	Q26676286
1 and 2, Wellington Place	II	1 and 2, Wellington Place			28 June 1972	SP5109906760; 51°45′26″N 1°15′40″W		1051622	1 and 2, Wellington Place	Q26303470
3 and 4, Wellington Place	II	3 and 4, Wellington Place			28 June 1972	SP5106806738; 51°45′25″N 1°15′42″W		1369460	Upload Photo	Q26650793

== See also ==
- Grade I listed buildings in Oxfordshire
- Grade II* listed buildings in Oxfordshire

== Sources ==
- Bradley, Simon; Pevsner, Nikolaus; Sherwood, Jennifer (2024), Oxford and the South-East, The Buildings of England, New Haven and London: Yale University Press, ISBN 978-0-300-20929-7
