= Listed buildings in Oxford (outside the centre) =

Buildings in Oxford, Oxfordshire, England

Oxford is a city and non-civil parish in Oxfordshire, England. It contains 1,147 listed buildings that are recorded in the National Heritage List for England. Of these 198 are grade I, 78 are grade II* and 871 are grade II.

This list is based on the information retrieved online from Historic England. The quantity of listed buildings in Oxford requires subdivision into geographically defined lists. This list includes all listed buildings outside the city centre.

== Key ==
Grade	Criteria
I	Buildings that are of exceptional interest
II*	Particularly important buildings of more than special interest
II	Buildings that are of special interest

== Listing ==
=== Green Templeton College ===
Name	Grade	Location	Type	Completed (Note: The date given is the date used by Historic England as significant for the initial building or that of an important part in the structure's description.)	Date designated	Grid ref. (Note: The grid reference is based on the British national grid reference system, sometimes known as OSGB36, used by the Ordnance Survey.) Geo-coordinates	Notes	Entry number (Note: The "List Entry Number" is a unique number assigned to each listed building and scheduled monument by Historic England.)	Image	Wikidata
The Radcliffe Observatory	I	Woodstock Road			12 January 1954	SP5090407163; 51°45′39″N 1°15′50″W		1047070	The Radcliffe Observatory More images	Q2066160
Osler House	I	Woodstock Road			12 January 1954	SP5094707170; 51°45′39″N 1°15′48″W		1369464	Osler House	Q17528769

=== Lady Margaret Hall ===
Name	Grade	Location	Type	Completed	Date designated	Grid ref. Geo-coordinates	Notes	Entry number	Image	Wikidata
Lady Margaret Hall, The Talbot Building	II	Lady Margaret Hall			12 January 1954	SP5161507640; 51°45′54″N 1°15′13″W		1046694	Lady Margaret Hall, The Talbot Building	Q26298811
Lady Margaret Hall, Chapel	II	Lady Margaret Hall			28 June 1972	SP5158407732; 51°45′57″N 1°15′14″W		1046697	Lady Margaret Hall, Chapel	Q26298814
Lady Margaret Hall, North and west sides of Wolfson Quad including Library, rooms and lodge	II	Lady Margaret Hall			30 March 1993	SP5156507629; 51°45′54″N 1°15′15″W		1047050	Lady Margaret Hall, North and west sides of Wolfson Quad including Library, rooms and lodge	Q26299164
Lady Margaret Hall, Old Hall	II	Lady Margaret Hall			28 June 1972	SP5157407585; 51°45′52″N 1°15′15″W		1046698	Lady Margaret Hall, Old Hall More images	Q26298816
Lady Margaret Hall, The Deneke Building (East and West) and the Dining Hall	II	Lady Margaret Hall			28 June 1972	SP5163107728; 51°45′57″N 1°15′12″W		1369668	Lady Margaret Hall, The Deneke Building (East and West) and the Dining Hall	Q26650966
Lady Margaret Hall, Eleanor Lodge (The Lodge Building)	II	Lady Margaret Hall			12 January 1954	SP5159807601; 51°45′53″N 1°15′13″W		1046696	Lady Margaret Hall, Eleanor Lodge (The Lodge Building) More images	Q26298813
Lady Margaret Hall, The Toynbee Building	II	Lady Margaret Hall			12 January 1954	SP5162907624; 51°45′54″N 1°15′12″W		1046695	Lady Margaret Hall, The Toynbee Building More images	Q26298812
Lady Margaret Hall, The Wordsworth Building	II	Lady Margaret Hall			12 January 1954	SP5161407667; 51°45′55″N 1°15′13″W		1046693	Lady Margaret Hall, The Wordsworth Building	Q26298810

=== St Anne's College ===
Name	Grade	Location	Type	Completed	Date designated	Grid ref. Geo-coordinates	Notes	Entry number	Image	Wikidata
St Annes College, Hartland House	II	Woodstock Road, St Annes College			29 August 1986	SP5104607306; 51°45′44″N 1°15′42″W		1047079	St Annes College, Hartland House	Q26299191
St Annes College, Wolfson And Rayne Buildings	II	Woodstock Road, St Annes College			30 March 1993	SP5109907287; 51°45′43″N 1°15′40″W		1369457	St Annes College, Wolfson And Rayne Buildings	Q26650790

=== St Antony's College ===
Name	Grade	Location	Type	Completed	Date designated	Grid ref. Geo-coordinates	Notes	Entry number	Image	Wikidata
St Antony's College, Chapel	II	St Antony's College			28 June 1972	SP5097707394; 51°45′46″N 1°15′46″W		1369682	St Antony's College, Chapel	Q26650974
St Antony's College, Main Block	II	St Antony's College			28 June 1972	SP5095807372; 51°45′46″N 1°15′47″W		1046641	St Antony's College, Main Block More images	Q26298785
Hilda Besse Building including stepped plinth and paved approach from west, St Antony's College	II	St Antony's College, Woodstock Road			28 September 2009	SP5095707455; 51°45′48″N 1°15′47″W		1393573	Hilda Besse Building including stepped plinth and paved approach from west, St Antony's College	Q26672726
St Antony's College, Boundary wall	II	St Antony's College			28 June 1972	SP5098007363; 51°45′45″N 1°15′46″W		1300509	St Antony's College, Boundary wall	Q26587807

=== St Catherine's College ===
Name	Grade	Location	Type	Completed	Date designated	Grid ref. Geo-coordinates	Notes	Entry number	Image	Wikidata
St Catherines College, podium and all buildings upon it	I	Manor Road, St Catherines College			30 March 1993	SP5225806640; 51°45′22″N 1°14′40″W		1229934	St Catherines College, podium and all buildings upon it	Q17528697
St Catherines College, Bicycle Store	I	Manor Road, St Catherines College			30 March 1993	SP5217406729; 51°45′25″N 1°14′44″W		1229973	St Catherines College, Bicycle Store More images	Q17528701
St Catherines College, Boat House	II	Manor Road, St Catherines College			30 March 1993	SP5212806827; 51°45′28″N 1°14′46″W		1230016	Upload Photo	Q26523730
St Catherines College, Brick retaining wall running North/South 2 metres west of The Music Room, between this and the bridge	I	Manor Road, St Catherines College			30 March 1993	SP5220306589; 51°45′20″N 1°14′42″W		1047051	St Catherines College, Brick retaining wall running North/South 2 metres west of The Music Room, between this and the bridge	Q17528504
St Catherines College, Masters House and attached garden wall to north (up to bridge) and south	I	Manor Road, St Catherines College			30 March 1993	SP5219506696; 51°45′24″N 1°14′43″W		1278800	St Catherines College, Masters House and attached garden wall to north (up to bridge) and south	Q17528705
St Catherines College, Music Room	I	Manor Road, St Catherines College			30 March 1993	SP5219606568; 51°45′19″N 1°14′43″W		1047052	St Catherines College, Music Room	Q17528510
St Catherines College, Squash Courts	I	Manor Road, St Catherines College			30 March 1993	SP5230406505; 51°45′17″N 1°14′37″W		1369495	St Catherines College, Squash Courts	Q121788266

=== St Hilda's College ===
Name	Grade	Location	Type	Completed	Date designated	Grid ref. Geo-coordinates	Notes	Entry number	Image	Wikidata
Library	II	St Hilda's College			23 July 1999	SP5220605926; 51°44′59″N 1°14′43″W		1387551	Library	Q26667198
St Hilda's College, Old Hall	II	St Hilda's College			28 June 1972	SP5220305885; 51°44′57″N 1°14′43″W		1369685	St Hilda's College, Old Hall	Q26650976
The Garden Building at St Hilda's College	II	St Hilda's College			12 November 1999	SP5218105746; 51°44′53″N 1°14′44″W		1379819	The Garden Building at St Hilda's College	Q26660048
St Hilda's College, Piers and gates to South Building	II	Cowley Place			28 June 1972	SP5217305812; 51°44′55″N 1°14′44″W		1046646	St Hilda's College, Piers and gates to South Building More images	Q26298788
St Hilda's College, Wall and piers on Cowley Place	II	St Hilda's College			28 June 1972	SP5222005914; 51°44′58″N 1°14′42″W		1183619	Upload Photo	Q26478857

=== St Hugh's College ===
Name	Grade	Location	Type	Completed	Date designated	Grid ref. Geo-coordinates	Notes	Entry number	Image	Wikidata
St Hugh's College Lodges and gates	II	St Margaret's Road, St Hugh's College			7 October 2008	SP5099007895; 51°46′03″N 1°15′45″W		1392937	St Hugh's College Lodges and gates	Q26672137
St Hugh's College Main Building including Library	II	St Hugh's College			7 October 2008	SP5096907860; 51°46′02″N 1°15′46″W		1392938	St Hugh's College Main Building including Library	Q26672138
St Hugh's College Kenyon Building	II	St Hugh's College			7 October 2008	SP5085407809; 51°46′00″N 1°15′52″W		1392941	Upload Photo	Q26672140

=== Wolfson College ===
Name	Grade	Location	Type	Completed	Date designated	Grid ref. Geo-coordinates	Notes	Entry number	Image	Wikidata
Wolfson College	II	Linton Road			20 June 2011	SP5154408296; 51°46′16″N 1°15′16″W		1402277	Wolfson College More images	Q2007225

=== Outside colleges ===
Name	Grade	Location	Type	Completed	Date designated	Grid ref. Geo-coordinates	Notes	Entry number	Image	Wikidata
Eastwyke Farmhouse	II	Abingdon Road			12 January 1954	SP5167304932; 51°44′27″N 1°15′11″W		1369700	Eastwyke Farmhouse More images	Q26650987
Folly Bridge Causeway	II	Abingdon Road			28 June 1972	SP5143905478; 51°44′44″N 1°15′23″W		1046595	Folly Bridge Causeway	Q26298757
Grandpont House	II*	Abingdon Road			12 January 1954	SP5150305450; 51°44′43″N 1°15′20″W		1299941	Grandpont House More images	Q17548769
Wall of Grandpont House	II	Abingdon Road			28 June 1972	SP5145005466; 51°44′44″N 1°15′22″W		1369699	Wall of Grandpont House	Q26650986
Holy Rood Church (Roman Catholic)	II	Abingdon Road, OX1 4LD (east side)			27 January 2020	SP5150105384; 51°44′41″N 1°15′20″W		1466650	Holy Rood Church (Roman Catholic) More images	Q97461158
Wall at Holy Rood Church	II	Abingdon Road (east-side)			28 June 1972	SP5146205385; 51°44′41″N 1°15′22″W		1046596	Wall at Holy Rood Church	Q26298758
Stone in Abingdon Road outside Number 309	II	Abingdon Road, Abingdon To Banbury Turnpike			28 June 1972	SP5196004031; 51°43′57″N 1°14′56″W		1184754	Stone in Abingdon Road outside Number 309 More images	Q26480076
The Old White House Public House	II	Abingdon Road			28 June 1972	SP5145005278; 51°44′38″N 1°15′22″W		1369317	The Old White House Public House More images	Q26650672
Summertown House	II	Apsley Road			28 February 1972	SP5042809847; 51°47′06″N 1°16′13″W		1369318	Summertown House	Q26650673
Gee's Restaurant	II	Banbury Road			7 October 2008	SP5109407553; 51°45′52″N 1°15′40″W		1392914	Gee's Restaurant	Q26672114
The Old Parsonage	II	1 and 3, Banbury Road			12 January 1954	SP5114107013; 51°45′34″N 1°15′38″W		1047358	The Old Parsonage More images	Q26299464
7 and 9, Banbury Road	II	7 and 9, Banbury Road			28 June 1972	SP5114007048; 51°45′35″N 1°15′38″W		1047359	7 and 9, Banbury Road	Q26299465
11 and 13, Banbury Road	II	11 and 13, Banbury Road			28 June 1972	SP5113707069; 51°45′36″N 1°15′38″W		1369319	11 and 13, Banbury Road	Q26650674
15-19, Banbury Road	II	15-19, Banbury Road			28 June 1972	SP5113307091; 51°45′37″N 1°15′38″W		1047360	15-19, Banbury Road More images	Q26299468
21, Banbury Road (former High School for Girls)	II	21, Banbury Road			28 June 1972	SP5111907120; 51°45′38″N 1°15′39″W		1369320	21, Banbury Road (former High School for Girls)	Q26650675
Rear Part of Number 25 (former Acland Home)	II	Banbury Road			28 June 1972	SP5110107189; 51°45′40″N 1°15′40″W		1047361	Rear Part of Number 25 (former Acland Home)	Q26299469
27, Banbury Road	II	27, Banbury Road			28 June 1972	SP5112007224; 51°45′41″N 1°15′39″W		1369321	27, Banbury Road	Q26650676
29, Banbury Road	II	29, Banbury Road			28 June 1972	SP5111507248; 51°45′42″N 1°15′39″W		1047362	29, Banbury Road	Q26299471
Wycliffe Hall	II	52-4, Banbury Road, North Oxford			7 October 2008	SP5115607393; 51°45′46″N 1°15′37″W		1392912	Wycliffe Hall More images	Q3402788
Wykeham House	II	56, Banbury Road			7 October 2008	SP5114907444; 51°45′48″N 1°15′37″W		1392911	Wykeham House More images	Q26672111
59, Banbury Road	II	59, Banbury Road			7 October 2008	SP5109307527; 51°45′51″N 1°15′40″W		1392910	59, Banbury Road More images	Q26672110
60, Banbury Road	II	60, Banbury Road			28 June 1972	SP5116207495; 51°45′50″N 1°15′36″W		1047365	60, Banbury Road	Q26299474
62, Banbury Road	II	62, Banbury Road			29 January 1968	SP5115707512; 51°45′50″N 1°15′36″W		1184974	62, Banbury Road	Q26480285
66, Banbury Road	II	66, Banbury Road			7 October 2008	SP5113807594; 51°45′53″N 1°15′37″W		1392909	66, Banbury Road More images	Q26672109
68 and 70, Banbury Road	II	68 and 70, Banbury Road			29 January 1968	SP5110407785; 51°45′59″N 1°15′39″W		1047366	68 and 70, Banbury Road	Q26299475
77, Banbury Road	II	77, Banbury Road			28 June 1972	SP5108307612; 51°45′54″N 1°15′40″W		1299888	77, Banbury Road More images	Q26587242
79, Banbury Road	II	79, Banbury Road			28 June 1972	SP5108307628; 51°45′54″N 1°15′40″W		1047363	79, Banbury Road More images	Q26299472
89, Banbury Road (The Lawn)	II	89, Banbury Road			28 June 1972	SP5102007746; 51°45′58″N 1°15′43″W		1047364	89, Banbury Road (The Lawn)	Q26299473
105, Banbury Road	II	105, Banbury Road			7 October 2008	SP5100508015; 51°46′07″N 1°15′44″W		1392907	105, Banbury Road	Q26672107
121, Banbury Road	II	121, Banbury Road			7 October 2008	SP5094408299; 51°46′16″N 1°15′47″W		1392908	121, Banbury Road	Q26672108
Somerville House	II	130, Banbury Road			12 August 1983	SP5101008600; 51°46′26″N 1°15′44″W		1047077	Upload Photo	Q26299189
Diamond Cottages	II	off Banbury Road, Summertown			10 July 2002	SP5092308799; 51°46′32″N 1°15′48″W		1061369	Diamond Cottages	Q26314571
Summertown War Memorial	II	Banbury Road, Summertown, OX2 7EZ			31 October 2016	SP5074109328; 51°46′49″N 1°15′57″W		1438950	Summertown War Memorial More images	Q66478053
275 and 277, Banbury Road	II	275 and 277, Banbury Road			28 June 1972	SP5071809267; 51°46′47″N 1°15′58″W		1299892	275 and 277, Banbury Road	Q26587244
Stone in Banbury Road outside Number 423	II	Banbury Road, Abingdon To Banbury Turnpike			28 June 1972	SP5038710301; 51°47′21″N 1°16′15″W		1369696	Stone in Banbury Road outside Number 423 More images	Q26650983
566, Banbury Road (former tollhouse)	II	566, Banbury Road			28 June 1972	SP5035210769; 51°47′36″N 1°16′17″W		1185012	566, Banbury Road (former tollhouse) More images	Q26480320
Barn of Mathers Farm	II	Barton Lane			28 June 1972	SP5460907619; 51°45′53″N 1°12′36″W		1047368	Barn of Mathers Farm More images	Q26299477
Mathers Farmhouse	II	Barton Lane			12 January 1954	SP5456807598; 51°45′52″N 1°12′39″W		1047367	Mathers Farmhouse More images	Q26299476
Wall of Mathers Farm fronting Larkins Lane	II	Barton Lane			28 June 1972	SP5458207670; 51°45′54″N 1°12′38″W		1185015	Wall of Mathers Farm fronting Larkins Lane More images	Q26480323
Garden Wall of Number 7	II	Barton Village Road			12 January 1954	SP5507707820; 51°45′59″N 1°12′12″W		1047370	Garden Wall of Number 7	Q26299479
Barton Manor	II	7, Barton Village Road			12 January 1954	SP5508007825; 51°45′59″N 1°12′12″W		1047369	Barton Manor More images	Q26299478
Church of St James	II*	Beauchamp Lane			12 January 1954	SP5398403825; 51°43′50″N 1°13′11″W		1185096	Church of St James More images	Q17548736
1, Beauchamp Lane	II	1, Beauchamp Lane			3 April 1973	SP5398803992; 51°43′55″N 1°13′11″W		1369467	1, Beauchamp Lane More images	Q26650798
10, 12 and 14, Beauchamp Lane	II	10, 12 and 14, Beauchamp Lane			1 May 1987	SP5401903813; 51°43′50″N 1°13′09″W		1047080	10, 12 and 14, Beauchamp Lane More images	Q26299193
Benson Cottage	II	11, Beauchamp Lane, Cowley			22 February 1990	SP5400203796; 51°43′49″N 1°13′10″W		1369489	Upload Photo	Q26650819
St Thomas Vicarage	II	Becket Street			28 June 1972	SP5062106194; 51°45′08″N 1°16′05″W		1299792	Upload Photo	Q26587154
1, Belbroughton Road	II	1, Belbroughton Road			7 October 2008	SP5104108417; 51°46′20″N 1°15′42″W		1392925	1, Belbroughton Road	Q26672125
Barn to west of Manor Farm Cottage and adjoining it	II	Binsey			28 June 1972	SP4922307657; 51°45′56″N 1°17′17″W		1047334	Barn to west of Manor Farm Cottage and adjoining it More images	Q26299440
Church of St Margaret	I	Binsey			12 January 1954	SP4856608060; 51°46′09″N 1°17′51″W		1047335	Church of St Margaret More images	Q17528536
St Margarets Well with Arch and Steps	II	Binsey			28 June 1972	SP4855308058; 51°46′09″N 1°17′52″W		1369348	St Margarets Well with Arch and Steps	Q26650700
The Thatched Cottage	II	Binsey			28 June 1972	SP4917907640; 51°45′55″N 1°17′20″W		1369347	The Thatched Cottage	Q26650699
Medley Manor Farmhouse, including doorway in garden wall	II	Binsey Lane			12 January 1954	SP4970207388; 51°45′47″N 1°16′52″W		1047336	Upload Photo	Q26299441
Bridge at north end of Bridge Street forming the junction with Botley Road	II	Bridge Street, Osney Island			28 June 1972	SP5022906213; 51°45′09″N 1°16′26″W		1047341	Bridge at north end of Bridge Street forming the junction with Botley Road	Q26299447
Church of St Frideswide	II*	Botley Road			29 January 1968	SP5015406191; 51°45′08″N 1°16′29″W		1369349	Church of St Frideswide More images	Q7593100
Vicarage at the Church of St Frideswide	II	Botley Road			29 January 1968	SP5014406157; 51°45′07″N 1°16′30″W		1047338	Upload Photo	Q26299443
Seven Arches Bridge	II	Botley Road			12 January 1954	SP5011706218; 51°45′09″N 1°16′31″W		1047337	Seven Arches Bridge	Q26299442
13, Bradmore Road	II	13, Bradmore Road			7 October 2008	SP5125507652; 51°45′55″N 1°15′31″W		1392926	13, Bradmore Road	Q26672126
2-4, Charlbury Road	II	2-4, Charlbury Road			7 October 2008	SP5129508034; 51°46′07″N 1°15′29″W		1392928	2-4, Charlbury Road	Q26672128
Barn at Cheney Farm	II	Cheney Lane			28 June 1972	SP5367906228; 51°45′08″N 1°13′26″W		1369356	Upload Photo	Q26650705
Old Church House	II	Church Lane			28 June 1972	SP4964409823; 51°47′06″N 1°16′54″W		1299657	Upload Photo	Q26587032
Church Cottage	II	Church Way			28 June 1972	SP5275803480; 51°43′39″N 1°14′15″W		1047314	Upload Photo	Q26299420
Church of St Mary, Iffley	I	Church Way			12 January 1954	SP5271403456; 51°43′38″N 1°14′17″W		1047319	Church of St Mary, Iffley More images	Q15978817
Churchyard Wall of the Church of St Mary	II	Church Way			28 June 1972	SP5275203453; 51°43′38″N 1°14′15″W		1299584	Churchyard Wall of the Church of St Mary	Q26586972
Cross in the Churchyard of the Church of St Mary	II	Church Way			28 June 1972	SP5273303440; 51°43′38″N 1°14′16″W		1047320	Upload Photo	Q26299425
Font outside the West Door of the Church of St Mary	II	Church Way			28 June 1972	SP5269203453; 51°43′38″N 1°14′19″W			Upload Photo	Q26299426
Court Place	II	Church Way			12 January 1954	SP5269703404; 51°43′37″N 1°14′18″W		1047322	Court Place	Q26299427
Garden Wall of the Manor House Rear wall of Manor House garden fronting Church Way	II	Church Way			28 June 1972	SP5272603596; 51°43′43″N 1°14′17″W		1047188	Upload Photo	Q26299291
Malthouse at rear and to north west of Number 94	II	Church Way			28 June 1972	SP5272603760; 51°43′48″N 1°14′17″W		1047317	Malthouse at rear and to north west of Number 94	Q26299423
The Priory	II	Church Way			28 June 1972	SP5299703908; 51°43′53″N 1°14′02″W		1047313	Upload Photo	Q26299419
Townsend Close	II	Church Way			28 June 1972	SP5289803954; 51°43′55″N 1°14′08″W		1047315	Upload Photo	Q26299421
Wall and Gate of Townsend Close	II	Church Way			28 June 1972	SP5288303976; 51°43′55″N 1°14′08″W		1369338	Wall and Gate of Townsend Close	Q26650691
Tudor Cottage	II	56, Church Way			28 June 1972	SP5287403922; 51°43′53″N 1°14′09″W		1047316	Tudor Cottage More images	Q26299422
Number 92 (Rivermead) and Number 94	II	94, Church Way			28 June 1972	SP5274603764; 51°43′48″N 1°14′16″W		1369339	Number 92 (Rivermead) and Number 94	Q26650692
Nowell House	II	103, Church Way			28 June 1972	SP5275203603; 51°43′43″N 1°14′15″W		1369337	Nowell House	Q26650690
Church Hall	II	120, Church Way			28 June 1972	SP5272303544; 51°43′41″N 1°14′17″W		1369340	Church Hall	Q26650693
Court House	II	122, Church Way			12 January 1954	SP5272603508; 51°43′40″N 1°14′17″W		1047318	Court House More images	Q26299424
Magdalen College School	II	Cowley Place			28 June 1972	SP5223105966; 51°45′00″N 1°14′41″W		1369343	Magdalen College School	Q99889181
2 and 3, Cowley Place	II	2 and 3, Cowley Place			28 June 1972	SP5222405942; 51°44′59″N 1°14′42″W		1047329	2 and 3, Cowley Place	Q26299434
Bartlemas House	II*	Cowley Road			12 January 1954	SP5346805502; 51°44′44″N 1°13′37″W		1047331	Bartlemas House More images	Q17548676
Chapel of St Bartholomew	I	Cowley Road			12 January 1954	SP5347505471; 51°44′43″N 1°13′37″W		1299349	Chapel of St Bartholomew More images	Q7592591
Church Hall of the Church of St Mary and St John	II	Cowley Road			28 June 1972	SP5322005445; 51°44′43″N 1°13′50″W		1047332	Upload Photo	Q26299436
Church of St Mary and St John	II	Cowley Road			29 January 1968	SP5317705460; 51°44′43″N 1°13′52″W		1369345	Church of St Mary and St John More images	Q26650697
Cowley Road Methodist Church	II	Cowley Road			28 June 1972	SP5258505847; 51°44′56″N 1°14′23″W		1047330	Cowley Road Methodist Church More images	Q26299435
Regal Cinema	II	Cowley Road			3 August 2004	SP5328105364; 51°44′40″N 1°13′47″W		1393171	Regal Cinema More images	Q26672355
St Bartholomews Farmhouse	II*	Cowley Road			12 January 1954	SP5342805470; 51°44′43″N 1°13′39″W		1299369	St Bartholomews Farmhouse More images	Q17548764
The Elm Tree Public House	II	Cowley Road			28 June 1972	SP5262105813; 51°44′55″N 1°14′21″W		1369344	The Elm Tree Public House More images	Q26650696
37 and 39, Cowley Road	II	37 and 39, Cowley Road			28 June 1972	SP5240605902; 51°44′58″N 1°14′32″W		1186069	37 and 39, Cowley Road More images	Q26481342
Garden wall of Manor Farmhouse	II	Dunstan Road, Headington			28 June 1972	SP5414007789; 51°45′58″N 1°13′01″W		1047295	Garden wall of Manor Farmhouse More images	Q26299399
The Manor Farmhouse	II	Dunstan Road, Headington			12 January 1954	SP5412407784; 51°45′58″N 1°13′02″W		1369368	Upload Photo	Q26650713
The Rookery (Ruskin College)	II	Dunstan Road, Headington			12 January 1954	SP5427107789; 51°45′58″N 1°12′54″W		1369369	The Rookery (Ruskin College)	Q26650714
Walls of Walled Garden at Ruskin College	II	Dunstan Road, Headington			28 June 1972	SP5431207847; 51°46′00″N 1°12′52″W		1047296	Upload Photo	Q26299400
8, Dunstan Road	II	8, Dunstan Road			28 June 1972	SP5411807827; 51°45′59″N 1°13′02″W		1047297	8, Dunstan Road More images	Q26299401
Pillarbox on corner of Warnborough Road	II	Farndon Road			28 June 1972	SP5064807683; 51°45′56″N 1°16′03″W		1047298	Pillarbox on corner of Warnborough Road More images	Q26299402
Field House	II	Field House Drive			28 June 1972	SP5039109700; 51°47′01″N 1°16′15″W		1047299	Upload Photo	Q26299403
Church Farmhouse	II	First Turn, Upper Wolvercote			12 January 1954	SP4963309792; 51°47′05″N 1°16′55″W		1047302	Church Farmhouse	Q26299408
Church Hall of the Church of St Peter	II	First Turn, Upper Wolvercote			28 June 1972	SP4966109841; 51°47′06″N 1°16′53″W		1047301	Upload Photo	Q26299405
Church of St Peter	II	First Turn, Wolvercote			12 January 1954	SP4968309835; 51°47′06″N 1°16′52″W		1047300	Church of St Peter More images	Q26299404
Wolvercote War Memorial	II	First Turn, Wolvercote, OX2			18 October 2017	SP4966409818; 51°47′05″N 1°16′53″W		1449828	Wolvercote War Memorial More images	Q66478995
1, Fisher Row	II	1, Fisher Row			28 June 1972	SP5088606159; 51°45′07″N 1°15′51″W		1186249	1, Fisher Row More images	Q26481507
2 and 3, Fisher Row	II	2 and 3, Fisher Row			28 June 1972	SP5088006170; 51°45′07″N 1°15′52″W		1047303	2 and 3, Fisher Row More images	Q26299409
Folly Bridge with former Toll House	II	Folly Bridge			12 January 1954	SP5143805559; 51°44′47″N 1°15′23″W		1319913	Folly Bridge with former Toll House More images	Q5464804
Folly House	II	5, Folly Bridge			29 January 1968	SP5142205521; 51°44′46″N 1°15′24″W		1369370	Folly House More images	Q26650715
Footbridge at the Trout Inn	II	Godstow Road			28 June 1972	SP4845709234; 51°46′47″N 1°17′56″W		1047307	Footbridge at the Trout Inn More images	Q26299413
Godstow Abbey	II	Godstow Road			12 January 1954	SP4843409109; 51°46′43″N 1°17′58″W		1116388	Godstow Abbey More images	Q17663596
Godstow Bridge	II	Godstow Road			12 January 1954	SP4840209215; 51°46′46″N 1°17′59″W		1369373	Godstow Bridge More images	Q5576938
Little Godstow Bridge	II	Godstow Road			28 June 1972	SP4841309252; 51°46′47″N 1°17′59″W		1116442	Little Godstow Bridge	Q26410054
Godstow Road bridge over Wolvercote Mill Stream	II	Godstow Road			28 June 1972	SP4864109429; 51°46′53″N 1°17′47″W		1116463	Godstow Road bridge over Wolvercote Mill Stream More images	Q26410072
Trout Inn	II	Godstow Road			12 January 1954	SP4843409275; 51°46′48″N 1°17′58″W		1369372	Trout Inn More images	Q7770502
Manor Farm	II	26, Godstow Road			28 June 1972	SP4953110026; 51°47′12″N 1°17′00″W		1047308	Upload Photo	Q26299414
67, Godstow Road	II	67, Godstow Road			28 June 1972	SP4909809698; 51°47′02″N 1°17′23″W		1369371	Upload Photo	Q26650716
The White Hart Public House	II	126, Godstow Road			28 June 1972	SP4886009703; 51°47′02″N 1°17′35″W		1116394	The White Hart Public House More images	Q26410012
Red Lion Public House	II	130, Godstow Road			28 June 1972	SP4883309681; 51°47′01″N 1°17′37″W		1047309	Red Lion Public House More images	Q26299415
139, Godstow Road	II	139, Godstow Road			28 June 1972	SP4883009612; 51°46′59″N 1°17′37″W		1116445	139, Godstow Road More images	Q26410057
Nunnery	II	187, Godstow Road			28 June 1972	SP4874509482; 51°46′55″N 1°17′41″W		1047306	Nunnery More images	Q26299412
St Barnabas School (church of England Senior School)	II	Great Clarendon Street			28 June 1972	SP5059606811; 51°45′28″N 1°16′06″W		1369374	St Barnabas School (church of England Senior School)	Q26650718
Headington Hill Hall and attached forecourt wall	II*	Oxford Brookes University, Headington, OX3 0BP			7 December 1992	SP5316806547; 51°45′18″N 1°13′52″W		1047044	Headington Hill Hall and attached forecourt wall More images	Q5689630
Headington Hill Hall Lodge House	II	Headington Hill			7 December 1992	SP5335706556; 51°45′19″N 1°13′42″W		1229839	Headington Hill Hall Lodge House	Q26523579
Stone on the north side of Headington Hill 20 yards to the east of the bridge	II	Headington Hill			28 June 1972	SP5328906497; 51°45′17″N 1°13′46″W		1184684	Stone on the north side of Headington Hill 20 yards to the east of the bridge More images	Q26480012
Bridge over Headington Road at Headington Hill Hall	II	Headington Road			28 June 1972	SP5325706472; 51°45′16″N 1°13′48″W		1116380	Bridge over Headington Road at Headington Hill Hall	Q26410003
Gatepiers at Hilltop	II	Headington Road			28 June 1972	SP5340206553; 51°45′18″N 1°13′40″W		1319993	Gatepiers at Hilltop	Q26606041
Hilltop	II	Headington Road			28 June 1972	SP5341506539; 51°45′18″N 1°13′39″W		1047310	Hilltop	Q26299416
Stone on the south side of Headington Road 50 yards east of Hilltop	II	Headington Road, London To Worcester Turnpike			28 June 1972	SP5344606570; 51°45′19″N 1°13′38″W		1046589	Stone on the south side of Headington Road 50 yards east of Hilltop More images	Q26298750
Comper Foundation Stage School	II	Hertford Street			13 May 1982	SP5310205198; 51°44′35″N 1°13′56″W		1047076	Comper Foundation Stage School	Q26299188
The Farm	II	Highfield Avenue			28 June 1972	SP5409606547; 51°45′18″N 1°13′04″W		1369391	Upload Photo	Q26650734
The Nuffield Press, East Wing and attached former School House	II	Hollow Way, Cowley			29 October 1987	SP5463904264; 51°44′04″N 1°12′37″W		1047081	The Nuffield Press, East Wing and attached former School House More images	Q26299194
Church of SS Edmund and Frideswide (Greyfriars Church)	II	Iffley Road, OX4 1SB			1 June 2012	SP5254505300; 51°44′38″N 1°14′25″W		1407742	Church of SS Edmund and Frideswide (Greyfriars Church) More images	Q26675954
Church of St John the Evangelist	I	Iffley Road			29 January 1968	SP5256905598; 51°44′48″N 1°14′24″W		1104879	Church of St John the Evangelist More images	Q7593805
Presbytery of the Church of St John the Evangelist	II	Iffley Road			28 June 1972	SP5255505610; 51°44′48″N 1°14′25″W		1047243	Upload Photo	Q26299350
137, Iffley Road	II	137, Iffley Road			28 June 1972	SP5254805446; 51°44′43″N 1°14′25″W		1104892	137, Iffley Road	Q26398854
Beechwood	II	Iffley Turn			28 June 1972	SP5321603938; 51°43′54″N 1°13′51″W		1047244	Upload Photo	Q26299351
Grove House, 44 Iffley Turn, Iffley, Oxford, Ox4 4Du	II	44, Iffley Turn, Iffley			28 June 1972	SP5307304089; 51°43′59″N 1°13′58″W		1369383	Upload Photo	Q26650727
16, James Street	II	16, James Street			31 October 1974	SP5263205582; 51°44′47″N 1°14′21″W		1047075	16, James Street More images	Q26299187
Ultimate Picture Palace	II	Jeune Street, Oxford, OX4 1BN			23 September 1994	SP5261305838; 51°44′56″N 1°14′21″W		1278732	Ultimate Picture Palace More images	Q7880229
Stone on Thames Towpath at Long Bridges, Kennington Backwater	II	Kennington Backwater, Thames Towpath			28 June 1972	SP5228804643; 51°44′17″N 1°14′39″W		1299959	Upload Photo	Q26587304
114-138, Kingston Road	II	114-138, Kingston Road			29 January 1968	SP5056207573; 51°45′52″N 1°16′07″W		1332959	114-138, Kingston Road	Q26617738
149-156, Kingston Road	II	149-156, Kingston Road			29 January 1968	SP5056907445; 51°45′48″N 1°16′07″W		1369384	Upload Photo	Q26650728
159-164, Kingston Road	II	159-164, Kingston Road			29 January 1968	SP5057407402; 51°45′47″N 1°16′07″W		1047245	Upload Photo	Q26299352
Wall and Gatepiers of the Grange	II	Larkins Lane			28 June 1972	SP5458307735; 51°45′56″N 1°12′38″W		1369386	Wall and Gatepiers of the Grange More images	Q26650730
1 and 2, Larkins Lane	II	1 and 2, Larkins Lane			28 June 1972	SP5457207693; 51°45′55″N 1°12′38″W		1106261	1 and 2, Larkins Lane More images	Q26400137
3, Larkins Lane	II	3, Larkins Lane			28 June 1972	SP5457507707; 51°45′55″N 1°12′38″W		1047247	3, Larkins Lane More images	Q26299354
3, 4 And 5 Lewin Close	II	3, 4 and 5, Lewin Close, OX4 3JL			12 January 1954	SP5401203853; 51°43′51″N 1°13′10″W		1047374	Upload Photo	Q26299484
The Britannia Public House	II	1, Lime Walk			28 June 1972	SP5434606992; 51°45′32″N 1°12′50″W		1047205	The Britannia Public House More images	Q26299308
7, Linton Road	II	7, Linton Road			7 October 2008	SP5114108193; 51°46′12″N 1°15′37″W		1392927	7, Linton Road	Q26672127
6, London Place	II	6, London Place			28 June 1972	SP5266906113; 51°45′04″N 1°14′18″W		1369409	6, London Place	Q26650751
7-9, London Place	II	7-9, London Place			28 June 1972	SP5267406123; 51°45′05″N 1°14′18″W		1047208	7-9, London Place	Q26299311
10, London Place	II	10, London Place			28 June 1972	SP5268006132; 51°45′05″N 1°14′18″W		1047209	10, London Place	Q26299312
11-13, London Place	II	11-13, London Place			12 January 1954	SP5268506142; 51°45′05″N 1°14′18″W		1047210	11-13, London Place	Q26299313
14-16, London Place	II	14-16, London Place			28 June 1972	SP5269206149; 51°45′06″N 1°14′17″W		1047211	Upload Photo	Q26299315
Stone in London Road outside Number 196	II	London Road, London To Worcester Turnpike			28 June 1972	SP5489407267; 51°45′41″N 1°12′22″W		1369694	Stone in London Road outside Number 196 More images	Q26650981
Church of St Michael and All Angels	II	Lonsdale Road			12 July 2001	SP5084809264; 51°46′47″N 1°15′52″W		1389257	Church of St Michael and All Angels More images	Q26668699
Church of St Clement	II*	Marston Road			12 January 1954	SP5270606330; 51°45′11″N 1°14′16″W		1369413	Church of St Clement More images	Q7592828
St Clement's War Memorial	II	Marston Road, OX3 3EE			14 February 2017	SP5275806309; 51°45′11″N 1°14′14″W		1441516	St Clement's War Memorial More images	Q66478322
Kings Mill	II	Marston Road			12 January 1954	SP5266406674; 51°45′23″N 1°14′18″W		1047222	Kings Mill More images	Q26299328
Stone at the junction of Marston Road and the footpath to Pullens Lane	II	Marston Road			28 June 1972	SP5287006624; 51°45′21″N 1°14′08″W		1046587	Stone at the junction of Marston Road and the footpath to Pullens Lane More images	Q26298748
St Stephen House and attached Cloisters	II	Marston Street			8 September 1992	SP5261905625; 51°44′49″N 1°14′21″W		1229802	St Stephen House and attached Cloisters More images	Q5273413
Holywell Ford	II	Mill Lane			28 June 1972	SP5218606500; 51°45′17″N 1°14′43″W		1369449	Holywell Ford	Q26650783
Manor House	II	Mill Lane			12 January 1954	SP5267303603; 51°43′43″N 1°14′20″W		1047187	Manor House More images	Q26299290
Old Iffley Lock	II	Mill Lane, Thames Towpath			28 June 1972	SP5259503639; 51°43′44″N 1°14′24″W		1047190	Old Iffley Lock More images	Q26299293
Rectory	II*	Mill Lane			12 January 1954	SP5268803478; 51°43′39″N 1°14′19″W		1047193	Rectory More images	Q17548627
Stable Wing and Garden Walls of the Rectory	II*	Mill Lane			12 January 1954	SP5271303478; 51°43′39″N 1°14′18″W		1369399	Stable Wing and Garden Walls of the Rectory	Q17548793
Roving Bridge Twenty Yards Upstream from Iffley Lock	II	Mill Lane			28 June 1972	SP5255403748; 51°43′48″N 1°14′26″W		1047191	Roving Bridge Twenty Yards Upstream from Iffley Lock More images	Q26299294
2, Mill Lane	II	2, Mill Lane			12 January 1954	SP5271903694; 51°43′46″N 1°14′17″W		1047189	2, Mill Lane More images	Q26299292
26, Mill Lane	II	26, Mill Lane			12 January 1954	SP5264303573; 51°43′42″N 1°14′21″W		1047192	Upload Photo	Q26299296
1-7, Mill Road	II	1-7, Mill Road			28 June 1972	SP4877809675; 51°47′01″N 1°17′39″W		1047194	Upload Photo	Q26299297
11, Mill Road	II	11, Mill Road			28 June 1972	SP4875809678; 51°47′01″N 1°17′41″W		1047195	Upload Photo	Q26299298
Osney Abbey	II	Mill Street			12 January 1954	SP5040105885; 51°44′58″N 1°16′17″W		1369400	Osney Abbey More images	Q7107284
Osney Mill Cottage	II	Mill Street			28 June 1972	SP5035805894; 51°44′58″N 1°16′19″W		1120787	Osney Mill Cottage	Q26413996
New Marston War Memorial	II	New Marston, OX3 0TX			20 January 2017	SP5285306915; 51°45′30″N 1°14′08″W		1440072	New Marston War Memorial More images	Q66478185
3, Norham Gardens	II	3, Norham Gardens			27 March 2003	SP5123407364; 51°45′45″N 1°15′33″W		1391542	3, Norham Gardens	Q26670898
5, Norham Gardens	II	5, Norham Gardens			7 October 2008	SP5125207376; 51°45′46″N 1°15′32″W		1392945	5, Norham Gardens More images	Q26672144
7, Norham Gardens	II	7, Norham Gardens			7 October 2008	SP5128307389; 51°45′46″N 1°15′30″W		1392946	Upload Photo	Q26672145
9, Norham Gardens	II	9, Norham Gardens			6 September 2000	SP5131807397; 51°45′46″N 1°15′28″W		1389280	9, Norham Gardens	Q26668720
13, Norham Gardens	II	13, Norham Gardens			7 October 2008	SP5140107446; 51°45′48″N 1°15′24″W		1392947	13, Norham Gardens	Q26672146
Gunfield	II	19, Norham Gardens			8 September 1992	SP5152807544; 51°45′51″N 1°15′17″W		1047043	Gunfield More images	Q26299159
Boundary Wall of Bury Knowle	II	North Place			28 June 1972	SP5467507425; 51°45′46″N 1°12′33″W		1369406	Boundary Wall of Bury Knowle	Q26650748
Bury Knowle	II	North Place			28 June 1972	SP5467307434; 51°45′47″N 1°12′33″W		1123722	Bury Knowle More images	Q26416822
1 and 2, North Place	II	1 and 2, North Place			28 June 1972	SP5457607375; 51°45′45″N 1°12′38″W		1047203	1 and 2, North Place More images	Q26299306
Manor Farm Cottage (40 yards to west of Perch Inn)	II	North Side Of Green, Binsey			28 June 1972	SP4923207660; 51°45′56″N 1°17′17″W		1047377	Upload Photo	Q26299486
Manor Farmhouse	II	North Side Of Green, Binsey			28 June 1972	SP4925207696; 51°45′57″N 1°17′16″W		1369326	Upload Photo	Q26650681
The Perch Inn	II	North Side Of Green, Binsey			12 January 1954	SP4928507688; 51°45′57″N 1°17′14″W		1185191	The Perch Inn More images	Q7756670
2, Northmoor Road	II	2, Northmoor Road			28 June 1972	SP5120308017; 51°46′07″N 1°15′34″W		1369405	2, Northmoor Road	Q26650747
20, Northmoor Road	II	20, Northmoor Road			23 November 2004	SP5114608301; 51°46′16″N 1°15′37″W		1391361	20, Northmoor Road More images	Q26670726
Boundary Wall of Number 56 fronting the Croft	II	Old High Street			28 June 1972	SP5453007411; 51°45′46″N 1°12′41″W		1123696	Boundary Wall of Number 56 fronting the Croft More images	Q26416760
Headington House	II	Old High Street			12 January 1954	SP5445607387; 51°45′45″N 1°12′44″W		1047204	Upload Photo	Q26299307
Wall of Headington House	II	Old High Street			28 June 1972	SP5452407449; 51°45′47″N 1°12′41″W		1369407	Wall of Headington House	Q26650749
69, Old High Street	II	69, Old High Street			28 June 1972	SP5457707450; 51°45′47″N 1°12′38″W		1337673	Upload Photo	Q26622067
Boundary Wall of Manor House	II	Osler Road			28 June 1972	SP5429407453; 51°45′47″N 1°12′53″W		1337005	Boundary Wall of Manor House More images	Q26621461
Manor House, including the Stable Block to the east	II	Osler Road			12 January 1954	SP5418607431; 51°45′47″N 1°12′59″W		1369430	Manor House, including the Stable Block to the east More images	Q26650769
White Lodge and Sunny Lodge Wall fronting Osler Road	II	Osler Road			28 June 1972	SP5430507385; 51°45′45″N 1°12′52″W		1047174	White Lodge and Sunny Lodge Wall fronting Osler Road More images	Q26299278
Oxford Canal Bridge Number 234 (tilting)	II	Oxford Canal, approximately 650 metres south east of Duke's Cut			28 June 1972	SP4916210093; 51°47′14″N 1°17′19″W		1046592	Oxford Canal Bridge Number 234 (tilting) More images	Q26298730
Oxford Canal Bridge Number 235 (Godstow Road Bridge)	II	Oxford Canal			28 June 1972	SP4936609846; 51°47′06″N 1°17′09″W		1369697	Oxford Canal Bridge Number 235 (Godstow Road Bridge) More images	Q26650984
Oxford Canal Bridge Number 236 (Wolvercote Green)	II	Oxford Canal			28 June 1972	SP4953609600; 51°46′58″N 1°17′00″W		1184763	Oxford Canal Bridge Number 236 (Wolvercote Green) More images	Q26480085
Oxford Canal Bridge Number 237 (site of)	II	Oxford Canal			28 June 1972	SP4999809031; 51°46′40″N 1°16′36″W		1046593	Oxford Canal Bridge Number 237 (site of)	Q26298755
Oxford Canal Bridge Number 238 (tilting)	II	Oxford Canal			28 June 1972	SP5016508769; 51°46′31″N 1°16′28″W		1184772	Oxford Canal Bridge Number 238 (tilting) More images	Q26480094
Oxford Canal Bridge Number 240 (Aristotle Lane)	II	Aristotle Lane			28 June 1972	SP5048207907; 51°46′03″N 1°16′11″W		1046594	Oxford Canal Bridge Number 240 (Aristotle Lane) More images	Q26298756
Oxford Canal Bridge Number 242 (Walton Well Road)	II	Oxford Canal			28 June 1972	SP5041707314; 51°45′44″N 1°16′15″W		1369698	Oxford Canal Bridge Number 242 (Walton Well Road) More images	Q26650985
Oxford Canal Roving Bridge (243) at Isis Lock	II	Oxford Canal			28 June 1972	SP5052706632; 51°45′22″N 1°16′10″W		1299976	Oxford Canal Roving Bridge (243) at Isis Lock More images	Q26587320
Cooper's Marmalade Factory	II	27, Park End Street			27 July 2000	SP5064906233; 51°45′09″N 1°16′04″W		1381170	Cooper's Marmalade Factory	Q26661295
1-47 and 49-64, Park Town	II	1-47 and 49-64, Park Town			29 January 1968	SP5138407825; 51°46′00″N 1°15′24″W		1047179	1-47 and 49-64, Park Town More images	Q26299282
Pillarbox at west end of the Crescent garden	II	Park Town			28 June 1972	SP5121807789; 51°45′59″N 1°15′33″W		1047180	Pillarbox at west end of the Crescent garden More images	Q26299283
North Lodge of the University Parks	II	Parks Road			28 June 1972	SP5118507293; 51°45′43″N 1°15′35″W		1081509	North Lodge of the University Parks	Q26356954
2-14, Plantation Road	II	2-14, Plantation Road			7 October 2008	SP5063707316; 51°45′44″N 1°16′04″W		1392948	2-14, Plantation Road More images	Q26672147
16-18, Plantation Road	II	16-18, Plantation Road			7 October 2008	SP5066407325; 51°45′44″N 1°16′02″W		1392935	16-18, Plantation Road More images	Q26672135
Church of England School	II	Quarry School Place, Headington Quarry			28 June 1972	SP5547106932; 51°45′30″N 1°11′52″W		1099142	Church of England School More images	Q26391296
Rewley Abbey, Wall and Gateway	II	Rewley Road			12 January 1954	SP5068006456; 51°45′16″N 1°16′02″W		1047151	Rewley Abbey, Wall and Gateway	Q26299256
Oxfordshire And Buckinghamshire Light Infantry War Memorial	II	Rose Hill			28 June 1972	SP5338904020; 51°43′56″N 1°13′42″W		1369419	Oxfordshire And Buckinghamshire Light Infantry War Memorial More images	Q26650759
Stone on the south west side of Rose Hill at the north east corner of Denton House boundary wall	II	Rose Hill			28 June 1972	SP5333004036; 51°43′57″N 1°13′45″W		1046588	Stone on the south west side of Rose Hill at the north east corner of Denton House boundary wall More images	Q26298749
Milestone on Rose Hill outside Number 37	II	37, Rose Hill, OX4 4JP, London To Oxford Turnpike			28 June 1972	SP5351603916; 51°43′53″N 1°13′35″W		1046591	Milestone on Rose Hill outside Number 37 More images	Q26298752
23, South Parade (formerly known as Lark Hill)	II	23, South Parade, Summertown			12 January 1954	SP5056009090; 51°46′42″N 1°16′07″W		1047092	23, South Parade (formerly known as Lark Hill)	Q26299204
South Park Commemoration Stone	II	South Park, OX4 1NQ			4 April 2017	SP5279906196; 51°45′07″N 1°14′12″W		1445102	South Park Commemoration Stone	Q66478685
The Limes	II	South Side of Green, Binsey			28 June 1972	SP4926607535; 51°45′52″N 1°17′15″W		1047376	The Limes	Q26299485
2 and 4, St Andrews Lane	II	2 and 4, St Andrews Lane			28 June 1972	SP5449307657; 51°45′54″N 1°12′42″W		1047159	2 and 4, St Andrews Lane More images	Q26299263
6, St Andrews Lane	II	6, St Andrews Lane			28 June 1972	SP5449607689; 51°45′55″N 1°12′42″W		1100600	6, St Andrews Lane More images	Q26393081
Church of St Andrew	II*	St Andrew's Road			12 January 1954	SP5446507635; 51°45′53″N 1°12′44″W		1348376	Church of St Andrew More images	Q15979300
Churchyard wall of the Church of St Andrew	II	St Andrew's Road			28 June 1972	SP5449607627; 51°45′53″N 1°12′42″W		1047160	Churchyard wall of the Church of St Andrew More images	Q26299264
1 and 3, St Andrew's Road	II	1 and 3, St Andrew's Road			28 June 1972	SP5453807605; 51°45′52″N 1°12′40″W		1369425	1 and 3, St Andrew's Road More images	Q26650764
Pavement fronting Numbers 10 to 14	II	St Andrew's Road			28 June 1972	SP5448807600; 51°45′52″N 1°12′43″W		1047162	Pavement fronting Numbers 10 to 14 More images	Q26299266
10, St Andrew's Road	II	10, St Andrew's Road			12 January 1954	SP5449707591; 51°45′52″N 1°12′42″W		1369426	10, St Andrew's Road More images	Q26650765
White Hart Inn	II	12, St Andrew's Road			28 June 1972	SP5448807597; 51°45′52″N 1°12′43″W		1101516	White Hart Inn More images	Q26395021
Building at rear of No 12 St Andrew's Road (fronting the Croft)	II	St Andrew's Road			28 June 1972	SP5448807551; 51°45′50″N 1°12′43″W		1047161	Building at rear of No 12 St Andrew's Road (fronting the Croft) More images	Q26299265
14, St Andrew's Road	II	14, St Andrew's Road			28 June 1972	SP5447207594; 51°45′52″N 1°12′44″W		1347888	14, St Andrew's Road More images	Q26631310
16, St Andrew's Road	II	16, St Andrew's Road			28 June 1972	SP5445507595; 51°45′52″N 1°12′44″W		1369427	16, St Andrew's Road More images	Q26650766
28-31, St Bernard's Road	II	28-31, St Bernard's Road			7 October 2008	SP5072307300; 51°45′44″N 1°15′59″W		1392936	28-31, St Bernard's Road More images	Q26672136
St Clement's Mission Hall with Number 57a	II	St Clement's Street			28 June 1972	SP5252706040; 51°45′02″N 1°14′26″W		1047164	St Clement's Mission Hall with Number 57a	Q26299268
Stone's Almshouses (8 tenements)	II*	St Clement's Street			12 January 1954	SP5251305999; 51°45′01″N 1°14′27″W		1047125	Stone's Almshouses (8 tenements)	Q17548546
Wall and gate piers of Stone's Almshouses	II	St Clement's Street			28 June 1972	SP5248206007; 51°45′01″N 1°14′28″W		1047126	Upload Photo	Q26299235
9 and 10, St Clement's Street	II	9 and 10, St Clement's Street			12 January 1954	SP5227206014; 51°45′01″N 1°14′39″W		1101498	Upload Photo	Q26394985
11, St Clement's Street	II	11, St Clement's Street			12 January 1954	SP5227906015; 51°45′01″N 1°14′39″W		1047163	Upload Photo	Q26299267
12 and 13, St Clement's Street	II	12 and 13, St Clement's Street			12 January 1954	SP5228906009; 51°45′01″N 1°14′38″W		1369428	Upload Photo	Q26650767
Florey Building wth attached walls and abutments	II*	23-24, St Clement's Street, OX4 1DW			12 March 2009	SP5234306082; 51°45′04″N 1°14′35″W		1393211	Florey Building wth attached walls and abutments More images	Q26672392
27, St Clement's Street	II	27, St Clement's Street			28 June 1972	SP5236906008; 51°45′01″N 1°14′34″W		1101788	Upload Photo	Q26395589
Angel Court (former Roman Catholic chapel)	II	St Clement's Street			28 June 1972	SP5258806003; 51°45′01″N 1°14′23″W		1047165	Angel Court (former Roman Catholic chapel)	Q26299269
81, St Clement's Street	II	81, St Clement's Street			28 June 1972	SP5258306025; 51°45′02″N 1°14′23″W		1101793	81, St Clement's Street More images	Q26395599
The Port Mahon Inn	II	82, St Clement's Street			12 January 1954	SP5256906024; 51°45′02″N 1°14′24″W		1047166	The Port Mahon Inn More images	Q26299270
89-94, St Clement's Street	II	89-94, St Clement's Street			28 June 1972	SP5243705992; 51°45′01″N 1°14′31″W		1047127	Upload Photo	Q26299236
The Black Horse Inn The Cottage	II	102, St Clement's Street			12 January 1954	SP5236105971; 51°45′00″N 1°14′35″W		1047128	The Black Horse Inn The Cottage More images	Q26299238
St Edwards School, Apsley House, Big School, Chapel, Macnameras House, Main Gate, Tillys House, Wardens House	II	Woodstock Road, St Edwards School			28 June 1972	SP5052208983; 51°46′38″N 1°16′09″W		1052279	St Edwards School, Apsley House, Big School, Chapel, Macnameras House, Main Gate, Tillys House, Wardens House More images	Q128260
Church of St Margaret	II	St Margaret's Road			28 June 1972	SP5057607813; 51°46′00″N 1°16′07″W		1068754	Church of St Margaret More images	Q15979395
Vicarage of the Church of St Margaret	II	St Margaret's Road			28 June 1972	SP5058207836; 51°46′01″N 1°16′06″W		1047114	Upload Photo	Q26299224
War Memorial at St Margaret's Church	II	St Margaret's Road			19 September 2007	SP5055707794; 51°46′00″N 1°16′08″W		1392249	War Memorial at St Margaret's Church More images	Q92204794
Chapel at St John's Home	II	St Mary's Road			28 June 1972	SP5301605359; 51°44′40″N 1°14′01″W		1068778	Chapel at St John's Home	Q26321472
St John's Home	II	St Mary's Road			28 June 1972	SP5301305337; 51°44′39″N 1°14′01″W		1369444	St John's Home More images	Q26650779
Church of St Thomas the Martyr	II	St Thomas Street			12 January 1954	SP5059906155; 51°45′07″N 1°16′06″W		1047122	Church of St Thomas the Martyr More images	Q7595583
Combe House	II	St Thomas' Street			12 January 1954	SP5063806142; 51°45′06″N 1°16′04″W		1343630	Combe House	Q26627413
The Lodge	II	St Thomas' Street			28 June 1972	SP5066706167; 51°45′07″N 1°16′03″W		1067794	The Lodge	Q26320590
Front wall, fence, gate and piers of The Lodge	II	St Thomas' Street			28 June 1972	SP5066406157; 51°45′07″N 1°16′03″W		1047123	Front wall, fence, gate and piers of The Lodge	Q26299232
Church of St Barnabas	I	St. Barnabas Street, OX2 6BG			29 January 1968	SP5049606840; 51°45′29″N 1°16′11″W		1299646	Church of St Barnabas More images	Q7592587
Stoke	II	Stoke Place			28 June 1972	SP5442807753; 51°45′57″N 1°12′46″W		1051679	Upload Photo	Q26303521
48, Temple Road	II	48, Temple Road			28 June 1972	SP5442304592; 51°44′15″N 1°12′48″W		1369475	Upload Photo	Q26650806
Manor House	II	74, Temple Road			28 June 1972	SP5456404543; 51°44′13″N 1°12′40″W		1047094	Manor House More images	Q26299206
76, Temple Road	II	76, Temple Road			28 June 1972	SP5451504513; 51°44′12″N 1°12′43″W		1373836	Upload Photo	Q26654757
Medley Footbridge at Medley Weir	II	Thames Towpath			28 June 1972	SP4976307480; 51°45′50″N 1°16′49″W		1047095	Medley Footbridge at Medley Weir More images	Q6807222
Memorial 300 yards south of Osney Lock	II	Thames Towpath			28 June 1972	SP5066205609; 51°44′49″N 1°16′03″W		1049076	Memorial 300 yards south of Osney Lock More images	Q26301132
Old Sunday School	II	The Croft			28 June 1972	SP5448307506; 51°45′49″N 1°12′43″W		1186142	Upload Photo	Q26481415
Boundary wall of the Old Sunday School	II	The Croft			28 June 1972	SP5448207487; 51°45′48″N 1°12′43″W		1047333	Upload Photo	Q26299438
Sandy Lodge White Lodge	II	The Croft			12 January 1954	SP5438007407; 51°45′46″N 1°12′48″W		1369429	Upload Photo	Q26650768
The Court	II	The Croft			12 January 1954	SP5436607474; 51°45′48″N 1°12′49″W		1186122	The Court	Q26481395
Boundary Wall of The Court	II	The Croft			28 June 1972	SP5438407468; 51°45′48″N 1°12′48″W		1369346	Boundary Wall of The Court	Q26650698
8, The Croft	II	8, The Croft			12 January 1954	SP5447807541; 51°45′50″N 1°12′43″W		1047293	8, The Croft More images	Q26299396
9, The Croft	II	9, The Croft			28 June 1972	SP5450007553; 51°45′50″N 1°12′42″W		1369367	9, The Croft	Q26650712
11 and 11a, The Croft	II	11 and 11a, The Croft, OX3 9BU			28 June 1972	SP5451607555; 51°45′51″N 1°12′41″W		1047294	11 and 11a, The Croft More images	Q26299397
Victoria Fountain	II	The Plain			28 June 1972	SP5225705998; 51°45′01″N 1°14′40″W		1369436	Victoria Fountain More images	Q26650773
The Peace Stone	II	The Plain			28 June 1972	SP5228405994; 51°45′01″N 1°14′39″W		1046584	Upload Photo	Q26298745
Church of the Holy Trinity	II	Trinity Road, Headington Quarry			28 June 1972	SP5545106867; 51°45′28″N 1°11′53″W		1369476	Church of the Holy Trinity More images	Q16246860
Headington Quarry War Memorial	II	Trinity Road, Headington Quarry, OX3 8LH			9 February 2017	SP5544306851; 51°45′27″N 1°11′53″W		1440047	Headington Quarry War Memorial More images	Q66478183
Oxford University Cricket Club Pavilion	II	University Parks			28 June 1972	SP5159007243; 51°45′41″N 1°15′14″W		1047099	Oxford University Cricket Club Pavilion More images	Q26299212
Church of St John the Evangelist	II	Vicarage Road, New Hinksey			28 June 1952	SP5148704581; 51°44′15″N 1°15′21″W		1047100	Church of St John the Evangelist More images	Q26299213
New Hinksey Vicarage	II	Vicarage Road			1 November 2001	SP5145204580; 51°44′15″N 1°15′23″W		1389486	New Hinksey Vicarage More images	Q26668920
Former St Pauls Church	II	Walton Street			12 January 1954	SP5084207012; 51°45′34″N 1°15′53″W		1047103	Former St Pauls Church	Q26299217
St Pauls Church Piers and Railings	II	Walton Street			28 June 1972	SP5082406996; 51°45′34″N 1°15′54″W		1052369	St Pauls Church Piers and Railings	Q26304154
The University Printing House (the Clarendon Press)	II*	Walton Street			12 January 1954	SP5085806914; 51°45′31″N 1°15′52″W		1052359	The University Printing House (the Clarendon Press) More images	Q17548698
Screen of the University Printing House fronting Walton Street	II	Walton Street			12 January 1954	SP5085706938; 51°45′32″N 1°15′52″W		1047102	Screen of the University Printing House fronting Walton Street	Q26299215
Oxford University Press War Memorial	II	Great Clarendon Street, OX2 6DP			1 June 2017	SP5080306896; 51°45′30″N 1°15′55″W		1447151	Upload Photo	Q66478808
96-101, Walton Street	II	96-101, Walton Street			7 October 2008	SP5065007202; 51°45′40″N 1°16′03″W		1392942	96-101, Walton Street More images	Q26672141
119a, Walton Street (former St Paul's School)	II	119a, Walton Street			28 June 1972	SP5088006950; 51°45′32″N 1°15′51″W		1047104	119a, Walton Street (former St Paul's School)	Q99845078
Walton Well Drinking Fountain	II	Walton Well Road			28 June 1972	SP5048107312; 51°45′44″N 1°16′12″W		1047105	Walton Well Drinking Fountain More images	Q26299218
Holyfield House	II	1, Walton Well Road			7 October 2008	SP5058407251; 51°45′42″N 1°16′06″W		1392943	Holyfield House	Q26672142
11-25, Walton Well Road	II	11-25, Walton Well Road			7 October 2008	SP5050407281; 51°45′43″N 1°16′11″W		1392944	11-25, Walton Well Road More images	Q26672143
Stone in Warneford Lane opposite the entrance to the Warneford Hospital	II	Warneford Lane			28 June 1972	SP5386306290; 51°45′10″N 1°13′16″W		1369693	Stone in Warneford Lane opposite the entrance to the Warneford Hospital	Q26650980
The Warneford Hospital	II	Warneford Lane, Headington			15 May 1997	SP5376406068; 51°45′03″N 1°13′21″W		1245464	The Warneford Hospital	Q26537999
The Warneford Hospital Chapel	II	Warneford Lane, Headington			15 May 1997	SP5370806095; 51°45′04″N 1°13′24″W		1245465	The Warneford Hospital Chapel	Q26538000
The Warneford Hospital Mortuary	II	Warneford Lane, Headington			15 May 1997	SP5370006106; 51°45′04″N 1°13′25″W		1245348	Upload Photo	Q26537896
The Warneford Hospital Nurses' Home	II	Warneford Lane, Headington			15 May 1997	SP5375806138; 51°45′05″N 1°13′22″W		1245349	Upload Photo	Q26537897
The Warneford Hospital: the Lodge and Front Garden Area Wall and Gate Piers	II	Warneford Lane, Headington			15 May 1997	SP5387506268; 51°45′09″N 1°13′15″W		1245350	The Warneford Hospital: the Lodge and Front Garden Area Wall and Gate Piers	Q26537898
16, Winchester Road	II	16, Winchester Road			3 September 2001	SP5099307569; 51°45′52″N 1°15′45″W		1389408	16, Winchester Road	Q26668844
41 Wolvercote Green	II	41, Wolvercote Green, OX2 8BD			28 June 1972	SP4954709748; 51°47′03″N 1°16′59″W		1047065	Upload Photo	Q26299179
The Radcliffe Infirmary (main Block)	II*	Woodstock Road			12 January 1954	SP5100907073; 51°45′36″N 1°15′44″W		1047066	The Radcliffe Infirmary (main Block) More images	Q7280027
Former Teaching and Out-patients Block at Radcliffe Infirmary	II	Woodstock Road			21 March 2002	SP5104207074; 51°45′36″N 1°15′43″W		1063899	Former Teaching and Out-patients Block at Radcliffe Infirmary	Q26317168
Fountain in Entrance Courtyard to Radcliffe Infirmary	II	Woodstock Road			28 June 1972	SP5103307097; 51°45′37″N 1°15′43″W		1369462	Fountain in Entrance Courtyard to Radcliffe Infirmary	Q26650794
Chapel Of St Luke, Radcliffe Infirmary	II	Radcliffe Infirmary, Woodstock Road			28 June 1972	SP5102307121; 51°45′38″N 1°15′44″W		1047067	Chapel Of St Luke, Radcliffe Infirmary More images	Q26299180
Gate Number 3 with flanking walls at Radcliffe Infirmary	II	Woodstock Road			28 June 1972	SP5104507116; 51°45′37″N 1°15′43″W		1369463	Gate Number 3 with flanking walls at Radcliffe Infirmary	Q26650795
Gateway Number 5 at Radcliffe Infirmary	II	Woodstock Road			28 June 1972	SP5102707153; 51°45′39″N 1°15′43″W		1047069	Gateway Number 5 at Radcliffe Infirmary	Q26299182
Boundary wall of former Radcliffe Infirmary fronting Woodstock Road	II	Woodstock Road			28 June 1972	SP5098607243; 51°45′42″N 1°15′46″W		1047068	Boundary wall of former Radcliffe Infirmary fronting Woodstock Road	Q26299181
St Giles Terrace	II	14-36, Woodstock Road			28 June 1972	SP5108407073; 51°45′36″N 1°15′41″W		1369466	St Giles Terrace	Q26650797
Royal Oak Public House	II	44, Woodstock Road			12 January 1954	SP5105407151; 51°45′39″N 1°15′42″W		1372274	Royal Oak Public House More images	Q26653403
45-55, Woodstock Road	II	45-55, Woodstock Road			12 January 1954	SP5094607277; 51°45′43″N 1°15′48″W		1047071	Upload Photo	Q26299184
Belsyre Court	II	57, Woodstock Road			7 October 2008	SP5091207318; 51°45′44″N 1°15′49″W		1392939	Belsyre Court More images	Q15198330
The Vicarage	II	68, Woodstock Road			7 October 2008	SP5090607507; 51°45′50″N 1°15′50″W		1392940	The Vicarage	Q26672139
71-79, Woodstock Road	II	71-79, Woodstock Road			12 January 1954	SP5089607355; 51°45′45″N 1°15′50″W		1372273	71-79, Woodstock Road	Q26653402
72, Woodstock Road	II	72, Woodstock Road			28 June 1972	SP5086807686; 51°45′56″N 1°15′51″W		1047074	Upload Photo	Q26299186
91, Woodstock Road	II	91, Woodstock Road			28 June 1972	SP5087407426; 51°45′48″N 1°15′51″W		1369465	Upload Photo	Q26650796
93-97, Woodstock Road	II	93-97, Woodstock Road			28 June 1972	SP5086707444; 51°45′48″N 1°15′52″W		1047072	93-97, Woodstock Road	Q26299185
Summertown Villa, formerly The Lodge	II*	304, Woodstock Road			6 June 2001	SP5044709435; 51°46′53″N 1°16′13″W		1246138	Summertown Villa, formerly The Lodge	Q17548753
Gate piers at entrance to Summertown Villa, formerly The Lodge	II	304, Woodstock Road			6 June 2001	SP5031309336; 51°46′50″N 1°16′20″W		1246140	Upload Photo	Q26538578
Gatepiers and walls to east of Summertown Villa, formerly The Lodge	II	Middle Way			6 June 2001	SP5047109440; 51°46′53″N 1°16′11″W		1246139	Gatepiers and walls to east of Summertown Villa, formerly The Lodge	Q26538577
Church of St Aloysius (Roman Catholic)	II	Woodstock Road			28 June 1972	SP5104907002; 51°45′34″N 1°15′42″W		1369461	Church of St Aloysius (Roman Catholic) More images	Q1666336
Presbytery to Roman Catholic Church of St Aloysius	II	25, Woodstock Road			11 February 1997	SP5107507017; 51°45′34″N 1°15′41″W		1258024	Presbytery to Roman Catholic Church of St Aloysius	Q26549320
Roman Catholic Church of St Gregory and St Augustine	II	322, Woodstock Road			21 January 1994	SP5021809601; 51°46′58″N 1°16′24″W		1230141	Roman Catholic Church of St Gregory and St Augustine More images	Q26523843
Church of St Philip and St James	I	Woodstock Road			29 January 1968	SP5089007557; 51°45′52″N 1°15′50″W		1047073	Church of St Philip and St James More images	Q7115269
Stone in Woodstock Road inside Number 243	II	Woodstock Road, London To Worcester Turnpike			28 June 1972	SP5064808553; 51°46′24″N 1°16′02″W		1046590	Stone in Woodstock Road inside Number 243 More images	Q26298751
Stone in Woodstock Road outside Number 12	II	Woodstock Road, London To Worcester Turnpike			28 June 1972	SP5109707014; 51°45′34″N 1°15′40″W		1369695	Stone in Woodstock Road outside Number 12	Q26650982
Stone in Woodstock Road outside Number 385	II	Woodstock Road, London To Worcester Turnpike			28 June 1972	SP4985809934; 51°47′09″N 1°16′43″W		1184737	Stone in Woodstock Road outside Number 385 More images	Q26480061

== See also ==
- Grade I listed buildings in Oxfordshire
- Grade II* listed buildings in Oxfordshire

== Sources ==
- Bradley, Simon; Pevsner, Nikolaus; Sherwood, Jennifer (2024), Oxford and the South-East, The Buildings of England, New Haven and London: Yale University Press, ISBN 978-0-300-20929-7
