= Elba (disambiguation) =

Elba is an island in the Mediterranean Sea off the coast of Tuscany, Italy.

Elba may also refer to:

== Places ==
=== In the United States ===
- Elba, Alabama, a city and county seat
- Elba, Idaho, an unincorporated community
- Elba, Illinois, an unincorporated community
- Elba, Minnesota, a city
- Elba, Nebraska, a village
- Elba, New York, a town
  - Elba (village), New York, within the town
- Elba, Ohio, an unincorporated community
- Elba, Washtenaw County, Michigan, a historic settlement
- Elba, Wisconsin, a town
- Elba Island (Georgia)
- Elba Island (Michigan)
- Elba Township (disambiguation)

=== Elsewhere ===
- Gabal Elba or Elba Mountain, Egypt
- Principality of Elba, a short-lived non-hereditary monarchy ruled by Napoleon
- Elbe River (in Hungarian: Elba), in the Czech Republic and Germany

== People with the name ==
- Idris Elba (born 1972), English actor
- Elba Esther Gordillo (born 1945), Mexican politician
- Elba Lightfoot (1906–1989), African-American painter and muralist
- Elba Ramalho (born 1951), Brazilian singer
- Elba Serrano, Puerto Rican neuroscientist
- Elba Vergés (born 1995), Spanish footballer
- nickname of Elbasan Rashani (born 1993), Swedish footballer

== Other uses ==
- East London Business Alliance, a corporate social responsibility charity in London, UK
- Elba DOC, a wine made from grapes grown on the island of Elba
- Italian cruiser Elba, a warship of the Italian Navy
- Fiat Elba, a car produced by Fiat
- Elba, a cookware manufacturer based in Treviso, Italy, now a subsidiary of Fisher & Paykel
- Elbasan alphabet for the Albanian language, represented in the ISO 15924 with the code Elba

== See also ==
- North Elba, New York
