= MF Global =

Defunct Financial Company (2007-2011)

MF Global Holdings Ltd.
- Type: Public
- Traded as: OTC Pink: MFGLQ
- Industry: Financial services
- Founded: 2007; 19 years ago
- Founder: Man Group
- Defunct: 2011
- Fate: Filed for Chapter 11 bankruptcy. The brokerage unit is undergoing SIPC liquidation.
- Headquarters: New York City, United States
- Key people: Jon Corzine (CEO) (Mar 2010-November 2011)
- Services: Financial broker, Online trading, Futures, Options, CFDs, Spread Betting
- Operating income: 100,000,000
- Total assets: ▲$42.460 billion (2010)
- Total equity: ▲$1.490 billion (2010)
- Number of employees: 3,271
- Website: www.mfglobal.com

MF Global Holdings Ltd., formerly known as Man Financial, was a major global financial derivatives broker, or commodities brokerage firm that went bankrupt in 2011. MF Global provided exchange-traded derivatives, such as futures and options as well as over-the-counter products such as contracts for difference (CFDs), foreign exchange and spread betting. MF Global Inc., its broker-dealer subsidiary, was a primary dealer in United States Treasury securities. A series of perceived liquidity problems and large fines and penalties dogged MF Global starting in 2008, and led to its bankruptcy in 2011.

In 2011, MF Global faced major pressures to its liquidity over several months. Some analysts and financial commentators indicate that MF Global probably experienced a number of trading days in 2011 during which the firm's bets on sovereign debt would have required the use of customer funds to meet capital requirements, thereby maintaining operating funds and possibly overall solvency. A large part of these pressures on MF Global were a result of the firm's involvement in a significant number of repurchase agreements. Many of these repo agreements were conducted off their balance sheet. Also, MF Global made a $6.3 billion investment on its own behalf in bonds of some of Europe's most indebted nations. Failure of those, and other repo positions, contributed to the massive liquidity crisis at the firm. MF Global experienced a meltdown of its financial condition, caused by improper transfers of over $891 million from customer accounts to a MF broker-dealer account to cover losses created by trading losses.

On October 31, 2011, MF Global executives admitted that transfer of $700 million from customer accounts to the broker-dealer and a loan of $175 million in customer funds to MF Global's U.K. subsidiary to cover (or mask) liquidity shortfalls at the company occurred on October 28, 2011. MF could not repay these monies with its own funds. Improper co-mingling, or mixing, of company and client funds took place for days before the illicit transfer and loans, and perhaps for many other days earlier in the year. According to the New York Times, "MF Global dipped again and again into customer funds to meet the demands", perhaps beginning as early as August 2011.

MF Global declared bankruptcy on October 31, 2011, and the company was liquidated beginning in November 2011. The trustee liquidating the company said that the losses incurred by customers of MF Global stood at $1.6 billion at April 2012. In January 2013, a judge approved a settlement that would return 93 percent of customers' investments, with the prospect of additional payouts from the company's general estate. In December 2014, MF Global Holdings settled a U.S. government lawsuit, agreeing to pay $1.2 billion in restitution and a $100 million fine for customer losses tied to the company's 2011 collapse.

== History ==
=== Origins ===
MF Global traces its roots to the sugar trading business started by James Man in England in 1783, which evolved into broader commodities trading before its later transformation into a financial services business during the 1980s focused on commodity futures trading.

=== The 1900s: Growth, diversification ===
MF Global's former parent, then known as ED&F Man, diversified from pure cash commodities into commodity futures in the late 1970s, and established the Anderson Man futures brokerage in 1981. It later changed its name to "ED&F Man International" and then "Man Financial". ED&F Man operated as a partnership through to the 1970s, when it started an international expansion which, by 1983, increased its staff 650 employees. ED&F Man listed on the London Stock Exchange in 1994, changing its name to "Man Group" in 2000. Its agricultural business, which retained the ED&F Man name, was sold to management the same year.

=== The 1980s-Early 2000s: Acquisitions, expansion and brokerage unit growth ===
The rapid expansion of the Man Investments unit in the emerging hedge fund management business shrouded many investors from the development of its brokerage unit. Man Financial embarked on a series of acquisitions, which expanded its product capability and geographic reach, starting in 1989 with the purchase of the Chicago-based GNP Commodities, and including well-known industry names such as Geldermann, Tullett & Tokyo Futures, First American Discount Corp., Australia's Ord Minnett and GNI.

=== 2002-2007: Acquisitions of a trading platform, client assets ===
The 2002 purchase of GNI was the largest of these and gave Man Financial access to the then growing Contract for difference market and GNI's trading platform GNI touch.

However, in 2005 Man Financial made its largest deal with the transformative $323 million acquisition of client assets and accounts from entities of Refco, following the U.S. financial-services group's collapse in late 2005. The Refco deal followed a hotly contested auction with Cerberus Capital, the private equity group, and boosted Man Financial's scale in retail and institutional business.

=== 2007 Spin-off and going public ===
MF Global was the brokerage segment of Man Group until 2007, when the Man Group decided to split the investment and brokerage businesses so they could each focus on their own markets. Man Financial was spun off from Man Group as part of the initial public offering (IPO) and separation of the brokerage from the asset management operation. The brokerage business made the final identity change to MF Global simultaneously with that IPO, which occurred in June 2007. The then-separate investment business retained the name of Man Group.

The company was registered in Bermuda, but subsequently moved its registration and headquarters to the United States.

=== 2008-2009: Major fines, liquidity concerns and stock price decline ===
On February 28, 2008, MF Global announced a bad debt provision in the amount of $141.5 million. The provision was the result of unauthorized trading by a representative in a MF Global branch office, who on February 27, 2008, while trading in the wheat futures market in his personal account, substantially exceeded his authorized trading limit. MF Global held a conference call at 11 a.m. EST on February 28 to discuss the matter. MF Global was fined $10,000,000 by the CFTC over the incident and an unrelated natural-gas incident from 2003. The CME Group also fined MF Global $495,000 over the wheat incident.

On March 17, 2008, shares of MF Global plummeted on liquidity fears. The CME, ICE, Nymex and CFTC issued statements confirming MF Global was in compliance with regulatory and financial requirements.

=== March 2010: Jon Corzine named CEO ===
Jon Corzine, former CEO of Goldman Sachs, Governor of New Jersey, and United States Senator, began his tenure as CEO of MF Global in March 2010. Corzine spent nearly all of the 9 years prior to joining MF Holdings as either U.S. Senator or governor. From 1994 to 1999, Corzine held the role of chief executive officer for Goldman Sachs.

== The looming crisis, bankruptcy and collapse ==
=== October 2011: MF Global bankruptcy and customer funds shortfall ===
On Sunday, October 30, 2011, a unit of the New York-based brokerage first reported to the Chicago Mercantile Exchange (CME) and the Commodity Futures Trading Commission (CFTC) a "material shortfall" of hundreds of millions of dollars in segregated customer funds. Customer accounts were frozen the same day.

On October 31, 2011, MF Global reported the shortfall in customer accounts at $891,465,650 as of close of business on Friday, October 28, 2011. According to the trustee overseeing liquidation the shortfall may be as large as $1.6 billion.

In March 2012, Bloomberg reported on a memo produced by congressional investigators that quoted an internal company e-mail relating to a $175 million transfer which was a subject of their investigation. Initial media reports suggested impropriety on Corzine's part, but this was later disproved. According to The New York Times, the employee responsible for the transfer emailed Corzine stating the transfer was a "House Wire", meaning it came from the firm's own account. The instructions Corzine had given were to deal with several overdrafts at JPMorgan Chase, but never related to any specific accounts or specific transfers made. A spokesperson for Corzine responded that Corzine "never directed Ms. O'Brien or anyone else regarding which account should be used to cure the overdrafts, and he never directed that customer funds should be used for that purpose. Nor was he informed that customer funds had been used for that purpose." In fact, as The New York Times reported, Corzine had been given specific assurances that the transfer in question was proper, and that no customer funds had been used. Subsequent court filings also attest to this fact. On November 5, 2013, The New York Times reported that MF Global customers would likely recover 100 percent of their funds. A spokesman for Corzine said "Mr. Corzine is very pleased that all customers will receive a full recovery. This is a great outcome, which has been anticipated for many months." Customers have since received distributions making them whole.

==== Re-purchase agreements used extensively by brokerage ====
The brokerage used a large number of complex and controversial repurchase agreements or "repos" for funding and for leveraging profit, many off their balance sheet.

Some of these complex repos have been described as a wrong-way $6.3 billion bet MF Global made on its own behalf on bonds of some of Europe's most indebted nations. Failure of the repo positions helped cause the liquidity crisis at the firm. The sudden disappearance of so much liquidity may indicate a scandal and crisis related to the widespread practice among US and UK brokers of rehypothecation of customer collateral.

=== Bankruptcy protection sought ===
On October 25, 2011, MF Global reported a $191.6 million quarterly loss as a result of trading on European government bonds. In response Moody's and Fitch cut the company's credit rankings to junk. Corzine was working to find a buyer, according to several reports.

The firm's board met through the weekend of October 29 and October 30 in New York to consider options including a sale to avert failure, according to a person with direct knowledge of the situation. It was stopped from doing new business with the New York Fed until it showed it was able to fulfill its responsibilities as a primary dealer, according to a statement on the regulator's website.

Trading in MF Global's stock was halted.

On Monday October 31, 2011, MF Global filed for Chapter 11 bankruptcy. This became the eighth largest bankruptcy protection filing in the history of the United States to that time. The Wall Street Journal reported that MF Global would seek Chapter 11 bankruptcy protection after investing more than $6.3 billion in sovereign bonds issued by European countries.

According to the Commodity Futures Trading Commission data, on August 31, 2011, MF Global had $7.3 billion in customer assets.

The MF Global bankruptcy was the largest Wall Street firm to collapse since the Lehman Brothers incident in September 2008.

==== Bankruptcy filing, the fallout and possible causes ====
At 10:21 AM Eastern Time in Manhattan on October 31, 2011, The New York Times reported that "in papers filed in U.S. Bankruptcy Court in Manhattan, MF Global listed assets of $100 million to $500 million and liabilities of more than $1 billion." By late afternoon (4:21 PM Eastern), Bloomberg News filed a story reporting that "the firm listed debt of $39.7 billion and assets of $41 billion in Chapter 11 papers filed yesterday in U.S. Bankruptcy Court in Manhattan" after making bets on European sovereign debt.

MF Global filed for bankruptcy protection because of heavy purchases of sovereign debt from some mired in the European Debt Crisis (including Ireland, Italy, Portugal, and Spain). The problems of the week preceding the Chapter 11 filing scared off investors en masse. These massive purchases of debt were highly leveraged by MF Global, using client monies in client accounts under the control of the firm. Upon the filing, credit ratings agencies immediately cut the ratings of MF Global to junk status.

Some commentators have suggested the failure of MF Global highlights the difficulty in regulating complex global financial firms, the dangers of off-balance-sheet accounting as well as touching on the European sovereign debt crisis. Most observers of all political stripes considered MF global to be over-leveraged and under-capitalized. Many took its collapse as a reminder that whatever the root causes of the 2008 financial crisis, some of the primary problems remain because of the lack of needed regulatory changes.

==== Creditors' claims in the billions ====
The largest creditor listed in the filing was JPMorgan Chase, with a claim of $1.2 billion. As administrative agent, JPMorgan structured a revolving credit facility. JPMorgan syndicated all but $80 million to other investors. Therefore, its own true exposure was $80 million. The second largest creditor was Deutsche Bank (on behalf of bondholders), with a claim of $325 million.

==== Board of directors; criticism of Corzine, board ====
At the time of its bankruptcy filing, MF's board of directors included:

- Jon S. Corzine, chairman and chief executive officer
- David P. Bolger, independent member, formerly with Chicago 2016 and Aon Corporation
- Eileen S. Fusco, attorney and CPA, formerly with Deloitte & Touche
- David Gelber, independent member, formerly with ICAP PLC, Citibank NA, Chemical Bank and HSBC
- Martin J.G. Glynn, independent member, former CEO of HSBC
- Edward L. Goldberg, founder of Longview Investments, formerly with Merrill Lynch
- David I. Schamis, managing director at J.C. Flowers & Co., and
- Robert S. Sloan, founder and managing partner of S3 Partners New York, formerly with Credit Suisse and Lehman Brothers

In the immediate wake of the bankruptcy, Corzine and the board were criticized in the financial press for their apparent non-awareness of the company's condition in the immediate lead-up to the event and their apparent inabilities to manage the risk the company had assumed.

==== Naming of bankruptcy trustees, controversy ====
Former Federal Bureau of Investigation director and federal judge Louis J. Freeh was named trustee for the MF Global holding company (MF Global Holdings Ltd.) bankruptcy case on November 25, 2011. This appointment was made just four days after Freeh was named to head the investigation for Penn State University trustees of the Penn State sex abuse scandal. For the MF Global bankruptcy case, Freeh was appointed by U.S. Trustee Tracy Hope Davis, working under the authority of U.S. Bankruptcy Court judge Martin Glenn.

Louis Freeh came under criticism following his appointment as MF Global Holdings bankruptcy trustee from politicians, commentators and former federal officials for trying to capitalize on cases such as MF Global and the Penn State sex abuse scandal, despite a federal career of his own that was fraught with controversy. Other experts and observers, however, found Freeh to be eminently qualified, and an excellent choice for trustee. These individuals expressed confidence that Freeh and his team could sort through the financial mess at MF Global, find the best possible legal resolutions to suggest and retrieve as much money for clients as possible.

Separately, James Giddens was named the trustee of the primary MF Global Holdings subsidiary, MF Global Inc., the broker-dealer.

==== Auditor subpoenaed for clients' assets information ====
U.S. regulators subpoenaed MF Global's auditor, PricewaterhouseCoopers LLP, for information on the segregation of assets belonging to clients trading on U.S. commodity exchanges.

==== Employees fired without severance pay ====
The bankruptcy trustees office charged with liquidating MF Global fired 1,066 employees of the broker-dealer subsidiary on November 11, 2011. The terminated employees did not receive any bonuses, deferred compensation or severance pay. The trustee's office confirmed that about 200 employees were hired back to assist in the liquidation process, including processing bankruptcy claims and wrapping up necessary business activities.

==== SEC reviewed debt sales for insider trading fraud ====
In addition to other investigatory work, U.S. Securities and Exchange Commission also reviewed trades in MF Global Holdings Ltd. (MF) convertible bonds to determine whether some investors sold the debt based on confidential information before the firm's demise.

==== Bankruptcy trustee, regulators investigate missing client funds ====
Clearly, client (or customer) accounts were misused to try to cover the bet made on European sovereign debt. Beginning in November 2011, MF Global was investigated by regulators for money missing from client accounts. The shortfall in client accounts at MF Global Holdings Ltd was thought to be around $1.2 billion as of late November 2011, according to the trustee liquidating the company.

As the trustees and liquidators continued their work in early 2012, they indicated that the total amount owed to clients was substantially higher. Rolling Stone reported in April 2012 that the number stands at $1.6 billion, and that "nobody disputes the fact that MF Global officials dipped into customer accounts and took...customer money."

US and UK investors continued waiting to see if and when they would be repaid for the misuse of their client account monies.

However, because rehypothecation is not allowed in Canada, the Canadian customers of MF Global were able to recover all their funds within 10 days.

==== Settlements ====
With, among other sources of cash, Corzine and other former MF Global executives in 2016 reaching a $132 million settlement with a trustee liquidating the company on behalf of creditors and, in 2015, executives having reached a $64.5 million settlement of separate investor litigation, portions of which were covered by insurance, all customers (as of 2014) and other claims on MF were settled.

== Corzine's possible role in the firm's collapse ==
Some prominent financial industry executives, journalists, regulators, politicians - and some MF Global clients - lay the blame for the demise squarely, and primarily, at Corzine's feet. On the day of MF Global's bankruptcy, a Bloomberg reporter wrote "Jon Corzine's risk appetite helped destroy his firm. It also provided an object lesson for Paul Volcker's campaign against proprietary trading on Wall Street."

Many sources indicate Corzine was heavily involved with the sovereign debt trades that led to the company's demise, indicating the firm took on the positions at his urging as CEO and chairman.

Structured-finance commentator Janet Tavakoli has alleged that Corzine's MF Global likely had a number of days in 2011 in which the company's bets on sovereign debt would have required the use of customer funds to meet capital requirements, thereby maintaining operating funds and possibly overall solvency. The New York Times reported as of December 2011 "investigators are now examining whether MF Global was getting away with such illicit transfers as early as August ... a revelation that would point to wrongdoing even before the firm was struggling to survive." The Times also reported that, as MF Global struggled to pay back creditors before parts of the firm could be sold before declaring bankruptcy, "MF Global dipped again and again into customer funds to meet the demands." Bloomberg News reported that such transfers occurred, on at least one occasion, "Per JC's [Jon Corzine's] direct instruction", according to an internal memo seen by Congressional investigators and Bloomberg. According to Bloomberg, representatives with JP Morgan, who provided credit for MF Global's operations, were also concerned about the source of funds used to maintain or pay back credit lines. Bloomberg reported that "Barry Zubrow, JPMorgan's chief risk officer, called Corzine to seek assurances that the funds belonged to MF Global and not customers. JPMorgan drafted a letter to be signed by [Edith] O'Brien to ensure that MF Global was complying with rules requiring customers' collateral to be segregated. The letter was not returned to JPMorgan." Corzine resigned from the firm in early November 2011.

=== Corzine's testimony before Congress ===
Corzine himself told Congressional investigators during his testimony in December 2011 that "I never intended anyone at MF Global to misuse customer funds and I don't believe that anything I said could reasonably have been interpreted as an instruction to misuse customer funds."

A Bloomberg story reported that "Lawyers said it was no surprise that he repeatedly focused on intent in his testimony," because proving intent is part of the burden of prosecutors in criminal fraud cases. The case has attracted scrutiny from a number of criminal enforcement and regulatory bodies, including the Commodity Futures Trading Commission (CFTC), the Securities and Exchange Commission, the Federal Bureau of Investigation, Congressional investigators, and possibly the Department of Justice (DOJ).

In his Congressional testimony, Corzine indicated that Edith O'Brien may have been at least partially responsible for the loss of customer money. His lawyers have also pointed to O'Brien. Friends of O'Brien said she was "being set up as a 'patsy'." On March 28, 2012, O'Brien invoked her Fifth-Amendment right against self-incrimination at a Congressional hearing and declined to testify about the missing funds, or any other matter related to MF Global's bankruptcy.

=== Fine and lifetime ban ===
In early January 2017, Corzine accepted a settlement with the CFTC including a $5 million fine to be paid "out of his own pocket rather than from insurance [and] a lifetime ban from CFTC markets". DOJ had, earlier, declined CFTC's request that it prosecute Corzine.
