= Pierre Lagrange =

Belgian hedge fund manager (born 1962)

Pierre Philippe Alexandre Lagrange (born 15 March 1962) is a Belgian economist, hedge fund manager, financier, and a co-founder of GLG Partners. His net worth is estimated at £500 million according to The Sunday Times.

== Early life and education ==
Lagrange was born in March 1962 in Belgium. He received both BS and MS degrees in Economics (Business engineering, Ingénieur de gestion) from the Solvay Brussels School of Economics and Management.

== Career ==
Lagrange worked for JP Morgan and Goldman Sachs before co-founding GLG Partners in 1995 with Noam Gottesman and Jonathan Green as a division of Lehman Brothers. The name of the company is composed of the first initials of each of the founder's last names. GLG became independent in 2000 and went public in 2007 listing on the New York Stock Exchange. In 2010, GLG Partners was purchased by the Man Group for US$1.6 billion. The two remaining GLG founders Noam Gottesman and Pierre Lagrange–Greene had left the company prior to the Man Group purchase–each received a $200 million shareholding in the Man Group in return for a three-year promise to stay.

In 2013, Lagrange purchased the Savile Row tailor Huntsman.

== Personal life ==
In 2009, the Sunday Times Rich List reported that his wealth declined £265 million to £195 million due to the credit crunch. In September 2011, his wealth had rebounded to £300 million.

In September 2011, he and his wife Catherine Anspach, with whom he has three sons, announced their divorce. The divorce settlement was estimated at more than £160 million. He married his husband Ebs Burnough in 2019. They live between Monaco, London, Hampshire and New York. His fourth child was born in 2020.

In November 2011, Lagrange sued the Knoedler gallery, New York, for selling him a fake Jackson Pollock painting.

He owned the Grade II listed Woodperry House in Oxfordshire, before downsizing in 2006 to a country house in Hampshire. In August 2011 he also reportedly sold a house at 17 Kensington Palace Gardens to the Russian-born billionaire Roman Abramovich, for £90 million.

Lagrange spoke of his opposition to Brexit in a 2019 interview with the Financial Times, characterising the 2016 vote as a "red herring" compared to wider problems facing the UK.
