= Woodperry House =

Building in Stanton St John, Oxfordshire, England

Coordinates: 51°47′22.15″N 1°10′2.33″W

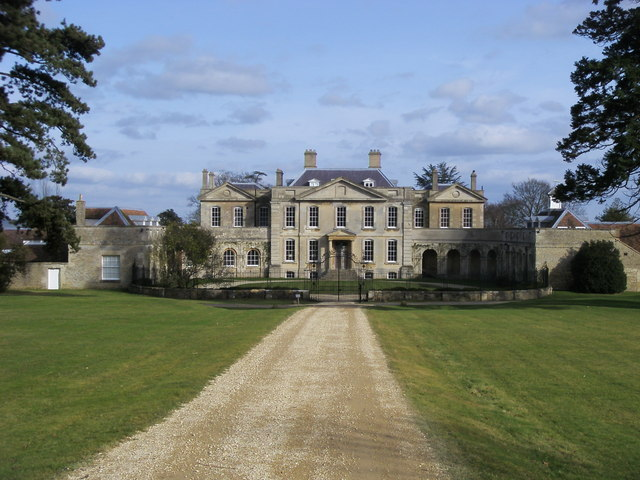
Woodperry House

Woodperry House is a Grade I listed building in Stanton St John, South Oxfordshire, England.

Woodperry was built from 1728 (298 years ago) for John Morse, a London goldsmith and partner in Child & Co. Morse owned a house in Woodstock at the entrance to Blenheim Palace that influenced the design, with the final Palladian style attributed to the Oxford architect William Townesend. Townsend also was the master mason on the Clarendon Building designed by Nicholas Hawksmoor, with the front of Woodperry similar to Clarendon. Thomas Fawsett was the principal joiner, and Charles Scriven the glazier. The final house cost £12,000.

Morse never lived in Woodperry, and after buying the larger Wooburn House in Buckinghamshire from the estate of the late Duke of Wharton, never finished Woodperry. He had left the property in his will to his niece, and in the meantime allowed his gardener William Pepall and his family to live in the house. But after falling out with his niece, Morse changed his will. After his death in 1739 the property remained in trust to Child & Co., which finished the property to include an oil on canvas painting of Westminster Abbey set in an elaborate over mantel, and an elaborate chimney piece with a fireplace by 1748. Child & Co. sold off the property in 1789.

By 1801, the property was owned by the mayor of Oxford, former carpenter James Pears. The president of Trinity College, Oxford, John Wilson (1850–66) retired to the property after his resignation.

The house was enlarged in 1879–80 when the porch and two pedimented wings were added, designed by Frederick Codd, an assistant in Sir Thomas Jackson's office. It was around this time that the house was bought by the Thomson family, who had made their fortune in banking services in Oxford.

In the 1970s the house was bought by Robert Lush, the Director and founder of Richmond Designs. Lush did much to restore the character of the building and gardens, in particular using the trompe l’œil marbling effects for which Richmond Designs was so famous. The house was sold in the 90s and, after being owned by Farzaneh and Kaveh Moussavi, an Iranian human rights lawyer, it was sold in 2006 for £20m to financier Scot Young, who then sold it in 2009 as part of his £400m divorce. Young sold it on to the Belgian financier Pierre Lagrange, one of the founders of GLG Partners. Legrange has since downsized to a smaller property. As of 2021, it is owned by Rory Fleming.

The house is Grade I listed on the National Heritage List for England.

== Woodperry ==
The name Woodperry is derived from the Old English wudu-pyrige, 'the pear-tree near the wood'. There was formerly a Woodperry village that disappeared after 1540, with excavations in the 1950s.
