= Ilba =

Ilba may refer to:

- Ilba, a village in Cicârlău, Romania
- Ilba (river), a river in Romania
- Yilba people, also spelt Ilba, an Aboriginal Australian people
  - Yilba language, language of the Yilba people

== See also ==
- Elba (disambiguation)
- IIBA
- LLBA
