= Elba Township, Michigan =

Elba Township is the name of some places in the U.S. state of Michigan:

- Elba Township, Gratiot County, Michigan
- Elba Township, Lapeer County, Michigan

== See also ==
- Elba Township (disambiguation)
