= Paul Donovan (economist) =

British economist and author

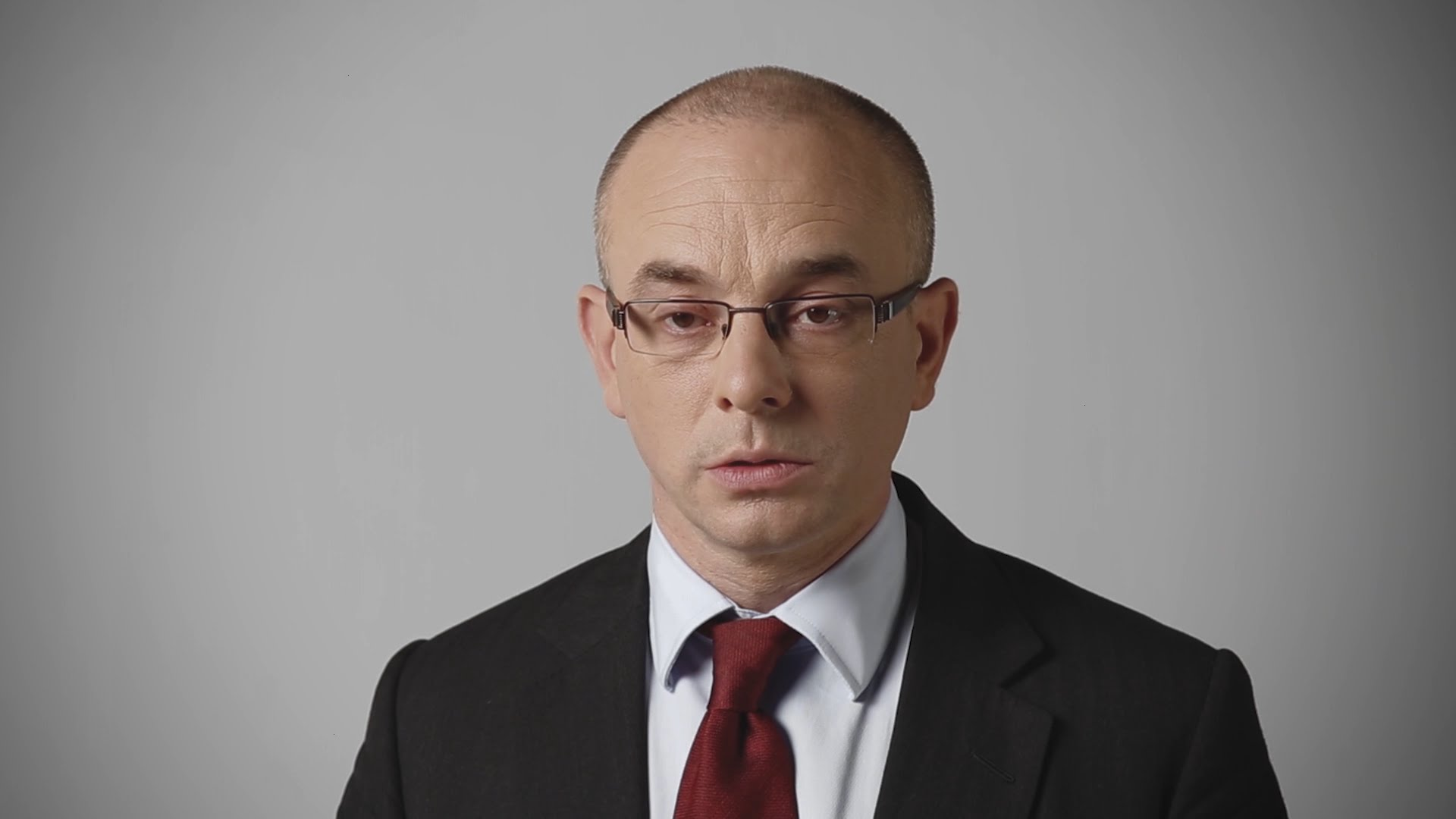
- Paul Donovan
- Born: 31 March 1972 (age 54); United Kingdom
- Education: St Anne's College, Oxford; SOAS University of London
- Occupation: UBS Wealth Management
- Known for: Economist and author

Paul Donovan is a British economist and author. He is Global Chief Economist for the Swiss financial services firm UBS Wealth Management.

== Education ==
Donovan attended Howard of Effingham School in Surrey before going on to study Philosophy, Politics and Economics at St Anne's College, Oxford, graduating in 1993. He also holds an MSc in financial economics from SOAS University of London. Donovan is an Honorary Fellow and Johnson Honorary Fellow of St Anne's College, and a member of the Vice Chancellor's Circle of Oxford University. He was made a Fellow of the Royal Economic Society in May 2025.

== Career ==
In 1992 Donovan joined UBS Phillips and Drew, as the investment banking arm of UBS was then known, as an intern in the Fixed Income economics department. In 1995 he moved to be global economist. His appointment as Global Chief Economist of UBS Wealth Management was announced in June 2016. He has been a managing director of UBS since 2004 and sits as a member of the Wealth Management Global Investment Committee. He is a member of UBS Pride, the UBS Art Board, and the UBS Sustainable and Impact Investment Institute, and participates in the UBS Nobel Perspectives program. Donovan is also a member of the World Economic Forum's Chief Economist Community.

== Economic views and notable research ==
Donovan has co-authored two books on environmental economics with UBS colleague and fellow St Anne's College alumna Julie Hudson. The book "From Red to Green" examined the concept of the environmental credit crunch, arguing that use of environmental resources could be considered to be an inter-temporal transfer of living standards in a similar manner to financial credit, and that the consequences of a credit crunch could usefully be applied to environmental issues. The subsequent book "Food policy and the environmental credit crunch" looked at the way in which food supply and consumption was dependent on non-renewable resources, and how this may be rectified so as to provide sustainable food supply in the future. A central argument was the need to control waste with holistic policies, not looking at specific parts of the food distribution process in isolation.

In 2015 Donovan published "The Truth About Inflation" arguing that inflation was a poorly understood concept in financial markets. In particular he focused on the issue of inflation inequality - the idea that aggregate inflation indices do not accurately portray the cost of living for certain groups in society. In particular, as income inequality increases, Donovan contends that a plutocratic statistic like consumer price inflation will increasingly misrepresent the cost of living for lower income groups in society. Donovan has criticised the idea of helicopter money arguing that it reduces policy flexibility, has dire consequences if not controlled, and that raising price inflation expectations may not be desirable if wage inflation expectations remain weak.

Donovan was one of the collaborators on the Guy Fox Project's book "How the world really works, the economy", a guide to economics aimed at children of around 10 years of age. An animated cartoon covering the topics of the book was produced in 2021.

Donovan is a self-described political economist, and has been critical of the veneration of mathematical modelling in economics. He supports the idea of the relationship between policy and the economy as being in flux (the Lucas critique).

Donovan has written several pieces of research on the economic damage that arises from prejudice in a society, focusing on the impact on productivity and labour markets. Donovan has argued that prejudice irrationally discards skilled workers, undermines existing workers' skills, and reduces flexibility in the workplace. Donovan has specifically addressed the economic consequences of prejudice around same sex marriage, arguing that the act of denying groups in society access to an institution that grants social status should be considered to be prejudice, and that this undermines economic efficiency.

In 2020 Donovan's book "Profit and Prejudice - the Luddites of the Fourth Industrial Revolution" was published, expanding his earlier work on prejudice. The book argues that the structural changes of the fourth industrial revolution are likely to increase prejudice, and that technology will both help and hinder the spread of prejudice. He argues that prejudice will be especially damaging to economies and companies during this period of structural change, as it is not technology but how technology is used that will determine economic success. This means employing the right person, in the right job, at the right time - and prejudice prevents that.

In 2006 Donovan authored a detailed analysis of the London 2012 Olympic games, in his role as economic adviser to the East London Business Alliance (ELBA). In this research, Donovan argued that the macro economic benefits of the games could amount to between £5.9bn and £7.8bn of long term gains for the London Boroughs of Hackney, Newham and Tower Hamlets.

While engaged in a discussion in June 2019 concerning Chinese consumer prices, Donovan commented that the swine influenza — which was causing the cost of pork to rise – mattered to "Chinese pigs and those who ate them". Donovan later apologized for his remarks before taking a leave of absence from UBS, saying "I made a mistake and I unwittingly used hugely culturally insensitive language." Patrick Winters and Benjamin Robertson of Bloomberg reported that "local rivals of UBS, which have been trying to take bigger piece of a business dominated by the established Western wealth managers, were quick to condemn Donovan's comments."

== Other interests ==
In 2003 Donovan co-founded the Peter Culverhouse Memorial Trust, a charity funding long term cancer care and research into low grade glioma. He sits on the investment committee, and development board of St Anne's College, Oxford and has worked with the Bridge Academy school in Hackney. Donovan is a member of the Research Advisory Board of the charity Open For Business, which promotes sexuality equality with economic arguments. Donovan is a Commissioner on the Institute of Directors Shinkwin Commission, promoting diversity in business. Donovan was named one of the top ten "Inspirational Leaders" by the British LGBT Awards in 2021. Donovan describes himself as a keen skier and an amateur heavyweight boxer.
