= H. Huntsman & Sons =

British fashion house

Coordinates: 51°30′38.91″N 0°8′24.57″W

H. Huntsman & Sons Limited
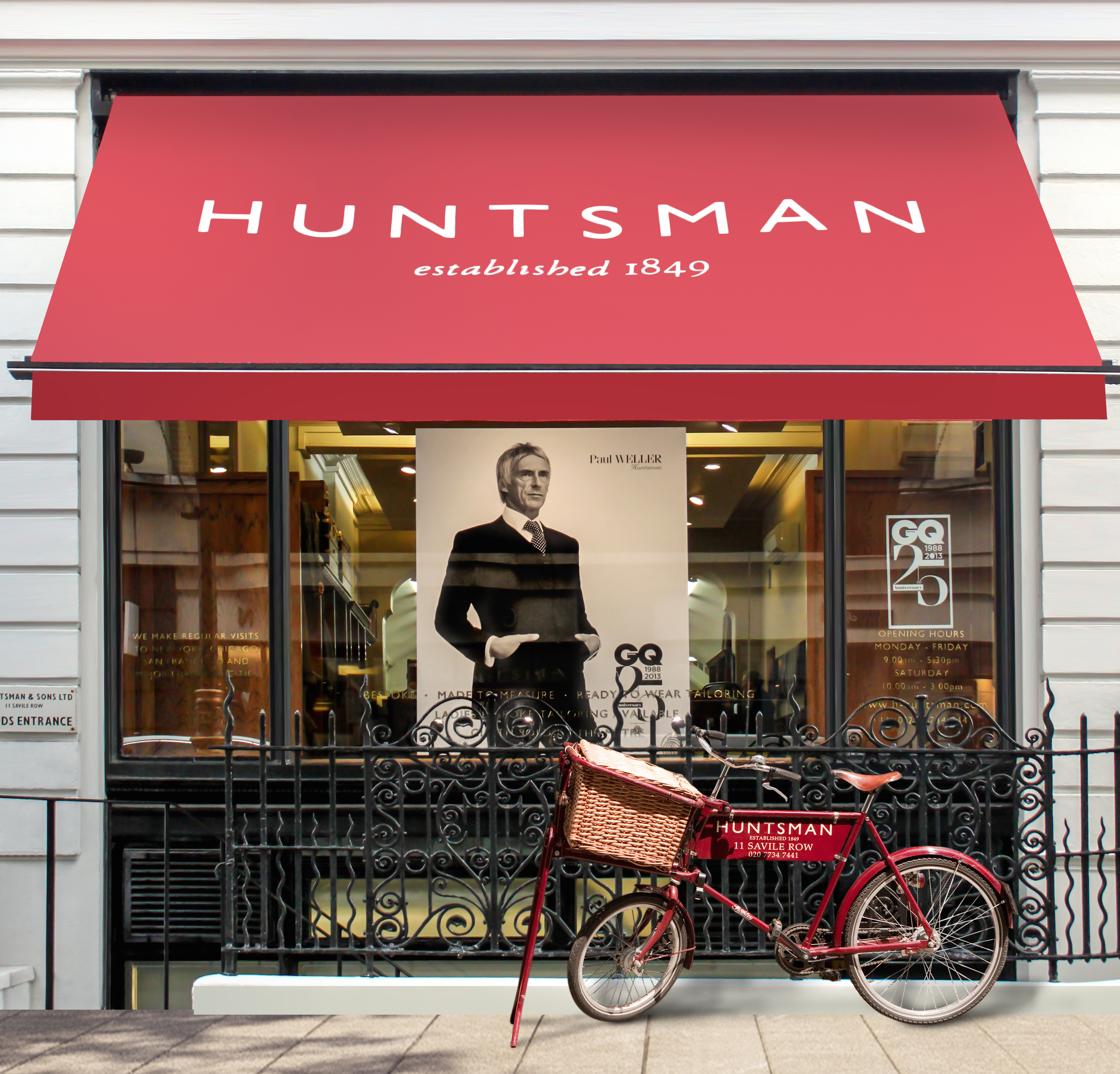
- Industry: Fashion
- Founded: 1849
- Founder: Henry Huntsman
- Headquarters: No. 11 Savile Row, Mayfair, London, England
- Number of locations: 2 (London and New York)
- Products: Luxury goods
- Services: Bespoke tailoring
- Website: huntsmansavilerow.com

H. Huntsman & Sons (known as Huntsman of Savile Row) is a high-end fashion house and bespoke tailor located at No. 11 Savile Row, London. It is known for its English bespoke menswear tailoring, cashmere ready-to-wear collections, and leather accessories.

In 1886, the company earned its first royal warrant as Leather Breeches Maker to HRH the Prince of Wales (later Edward VII). The Huntsman building was used as the facade for the Kingsman shop for Matthew Vaughn's blockbuster movie franchise Kingsman, and continues to display a Kingsman plaque by the door.

Founded in 1849, Huntsman is a Savile Row tailor, producing traditional bespoke tailoring for gentlemen and ladies. Huntsman has been granted several royal warrants bestowed by British and European monarchs, including The Prince of Wales, (later Edward VII) and Queen Victoria. Huntsman is also one of the founders of the Savile Row Bespoke Association - the trade body responsible for protecting and promoting the working practices of Savile Row.

== History ==
Founded in 1849 by Mr. Henry Huntsman, H. Huntsman & Sons incorporated a Victorian breeches-maker dating back to 1809 when the house was first established at No. 126 New Bond Street. Henry Huntsman thereby founded a tailoring house which quickly gained a reputation for dressing the hunting and riding aristocracy of Europe for much of the nineteenth century. Huntsman continues to make equestrian and sporting tailoring today and Henry Huntsman's very own breeches are still displayed in the company's Savile Row shop. Early twentieth century advertisements for Huntsman breeches survive in the company's archives, as do photographs depicting many golden-era Hollywood celebrities (Clark Gable and David Niven for example) wearing Huntsman breeches and riding trousers, as well as images of His Royal Highness Edward VII in full equestrian dress atop horse. The house's relationship with British royalty extends as far back as Queen Victoria and Prince Albert, who both patronised the house from its opening in 1849.

During the First World War, Huntsman's was a tailor to the military, producing dress uniforms for British officers throughout the conflict. Several ledger books remain in Huntsman's archives today, listing the names of each officer and their commissions, often with a note revealing their fate in the margins. The firm moved to No. 11 Savile Row with the ending of the war in 1919 with the onset of the Roaring 20s. The Prince of Wales (soon to become Edward VIII) was a customer during the 1920s, which prompted much of the jet-set of the time to follow. Cecil Beaton, Laurence Olivier, Bill Blass and Lord Louis Mountbatten were all notable clients. It was during this time that Huntsman came to acquire the two stags' heads which overlook the shop-front today. They fell into the company's hands by chance; being left by a customer who went out to lunch in 1921 and neglected to ever return.

In 1932, Henry Huntsman's sons passed on the firm to Mr. Robert Packer. Packer was the 'human dynamo' according to Richard Anderson, who drove the company forward into the twenty-first century, transforming "Huntsman's reputation from that of merely a reliable gaiter and britches maker to a glamorous bespoke fashion house". From the 30s to the 70s, working with Head Cutter Colin Hammick, Packer ensured that Huntsman's reputation as the most expensive Savile Row tailor was well established. Hammick believed he offered 'the best quality' on Savile Row to justify the house's high prices, retaining a high-profile international client list. One of these clients was Gregory Peck, who Huntsman dressed for half a century between 1953 and 2003. During this time Peck (and his film studios) commissioned over 160 suits from the house both for use on screen and off.

Advertising material from the 50s and 60s shows that Hammick created traditional Savile Row tailoring with a fashionable edge. Indeed, Hammick himself was named the 'Best Dressed Man of the Year' by the Tailor & Cutter magazine in 1971, testifying to his sense of style. Notably, Hammick not only oversaw operations when Huntsman was at its largest in terms of size - during the early 80s the house employed some 130 people and in 1980 reported sales of $2.4 million - but was also responsible for mentoring many of Savile Row's current heavyweights.

In 2013, financier Pierre Lagrange purchased Huntsman, and the house has since undergone a number of modernisations. Campbell Carey was appointed Creative Director in 2015 and has helped to reintroduce a Huntsman ready-to-wear collection. Lagrange has also introduced E-commerce to the company's website. Simultaneously, Senior Cutter Dario Carnera, was promoted Co-Head Cutter with Mr Carey, a first in the history of Savile Row. Likewise in 2013, Huntsman acted as the inspiration behind ‘Kingsman: The Secret Service’ a Hollywood spy-thriller starring Colin Firth and Samuel L. Jackson. Reportedly, Director Matthew Vaughn first decided to set his film within a tailor's shop when visiting Huntsman for a fitting. Vaughn has been a Huntsman customer since his mother brought him to the store to order his first bespoke suit at eighteen years of age, making Huntsman a natural choice of setting. Both the shop front and interior appear in the movie.

== Bespoke process ==
Although Huntsman's suits retain what Wei Koh, Editor-in-Chief of The Rake magazine refers to as 'their famous structured silhouette', Huntsman's website notes that 'our team can work to almost any brief'. Most recently, the house created a bespoke quilted-leather double-breasted car-coat in collaboration with Bentley.

As outlined on the Huntsman website, the process of placing an order begins with a consultation, during which the customer meets with Johnny Allen, Bespoke Clients Manager, who discusses the customer's requirements for his suit, helping to finalise any stylistic decisions and his choice of fabric. A cutter will then measure-up the client (Huntsman takes an average of 30 different measures for a first suit), before this is drafted into the traditional brown paper pattern. This pattern is then chalked onto the customer's chosen cloth, which is in turn cut out. This will then be sewn together into the suit's raw three-dimensional form by a dedicated coat maker, ready for fitting. Huntsman produces all of its clothes in house, so every suit is produced by the same team.

After the first fitting, the basted garment is then returned to its two-dimensional form and re-cut according to the refined pattern, after which a second fitting will take place to re-assess the garment's fit. More structure will be added to the garment at this stage, jacket sleeves will be set-in by hand and the suit's lining felled into the garment accordingly. Other hand-sewn elements will include all buttonholes, the trouser fly and any topstitching applied to the jacket and/or waistcoat lapels and pocket flaps - conforming to Savile Row Bespoke Association working standards. Further alterations are carried out if required and a final fitting will take place. Each individual suit takes over eighty man-hours to produce.

== House style ==
The classic Huntsman house style takes influence from both the hunting jacket and black tie. It is characterised predominantly by its structured shoulders and high armholes. The line through the waist is cut long with a subtle hourglass shape and some flair in the skirt which reflects Huntsman's sporting heritage. Jackets are generally cut with Huntsman's signature one button fastening and menswear historian James Sherwood notes that 'the one-button [coat] is notoriously difficult to balance - the cutter's answer to a perfect pirouette en pointe - hence Huntsman's pride in it'.

== House cloths ==
Huntsman has a long history of commissioning exclusive cloths for its customers, particularly bold checked tweeds. These are produced on an annual basis at the family-run Islay Woollen Mill, the oldest woollen mill in the Inner Hebrides.

In 2014, the house produced a collection of exclusive tweeds inspired by those worn by Huntsman's famous patron Gregory Peck. Clothes worn by Peck and cut by Huntsman's famous former Head Cutter Colin Hammick in the 1960s survive in the Peck family to this day. Upon rediscovering one particularly bold checked tweed sports coat, cut in an exclusive house tweed from 1961, Huntsman redeveloped the tweed, enlarging the original design and lending it a softer, more contemporary finish. In 2015, the house produced its first cashmere tweed in over fifty years, a replica of a houndstooth cloth that was originally an exclusive Huntsman fabric woven in 1952 and favoured by Peck.

The House also has a reputation for the production of limited edition suitings, working closely with wool producers and weavers on exclusive projects. In 2007, the house purchased the world's only bale of 11.9 micron, 1PP graded wool at a wool auction in Melbourne, Australia. The combination of such a low micron count together with the AWEX 1PP award for wool-quality effectively graded the wool as the finest ever produced. This was woven into Huntsman's record breaking 'Opus' cloth, woven to one of the finest yarn counts possible, a 'Super 240s'. 34 suit lengths of the cloth were produced, woven into a navy twill and herringbone. Today, only a few metres of the navy herringbone remain, with the navy twill entirely sold out.

== Clients ==
Huntsman clients have included King Edward VII, King Edward VIII, King Alfonso XII, Winston Churchill, Rudolph Valentino, Lord Mountbatten, Gregory Peck, Clark Gable, Douglas Fairbanks Jr, Laurence Olivier, Charlie Watts, David Bowie, Ronald Reagan, Marc Jacobs, Lapo Elkann, and Gianni Agnelli.

== Staff ==
Creative Director and Co-Head Cutter Campbell Carey joined Huntsman in early 2015.

Sharing the role of Co-Head Cutter with Carey is Dario Carnera, whose background is similarly bespoke-orientated, with his father running the London cordwainer G.J. Cleverley.

In March 2015, Dionne Reeves and Vanessa Black, two of Huntsman's apprentices qualified as Finalists for The Golden Shears, (Savile Row's biannual bespoke tailoring competition for young tailors, commonly referred to as the Oscars of the tailoring world). Reeves went on to receive the prestigious Silver Shears award.

== Modern developments ==
=== 2013–2015 ===
Since taking over the company in 2013, Owner and Non-Executive Chairman Pierre Lagrange has introduced a number of developments which differentiate Huntsman from the majority of Savile Row tailors. Under Lagrange's direction, Huntsman launched its 'Archive Collection' in 2013, a capsule collection of ready-to-wear tailoring, shirting and accessories, returning a ready-to-wear product to Huntsman. The collection focused on both rejuvenating some aspects of Huntsman's traditional block, but also sought to integrate true menswear classics into the collection, as inspired by Huntsman's extensive historical archives. E-commerce was introduced at the same time, allowing for the ready-to-wear collection to be purchased online. Huntsman's website states that newly appointed Creative Director Campbell Carey is responsible for overseeing the ready-to-wear collection. The house's new general manager, Carol Pierce (formally the head of Dunhill's bespoke division), was also appointed in 2015 to oversee the house's bespoke operations.

Alongside regular visits to the east coast of America, visiting clients based in New York City, Boston and Washington (as well as Chicago), the house also undertakes regular west coast tours, visiting San Francisco and Los Angeles. Huntsman is also the first Savile Row tailor to open a permanent location in New York, a move that was announced in May 2015. An Asia tour has also been scheduled for September 2015, including a trunk show in Seoul and visits to Tokyo, Singapore, Hong Kong and Beijing.

Additionally, Huntsman is the sponsor of selected initiatives in the world of professional Polo. In June 2014, the Huntsman Polo Team was formed and won bronze, silver and gold cups in the Land Rover International Polo Tournament. In November 2014, the house partnered again with another team led by His Royal Highness Prince Harry, dressing his 'Huntsman Sentebale Polo Team' for the Sentebale Polo Cup in Abu Dhabi. A limited number of exclusive polo shirts were available to purchase after the tournament, with a percentage of the proceeds going to Sentebale. Huntsman also designed a unique lining for the contest, featuring a motif of forget-me-nots, a mark of respect to those children which the Prince's Sentebale charity (the motif of which is also the forget-me-not) works to protect from poverty and disease.

Huntsman was one of five founding members of the Savile Row Bespoke Association - Savile Row's protective trade body.

=== 2016–2017 ===
In February 2016, Huntsman became the first Savile Row tailor to open a permanent location in New York, with a location at 130 West 57th Street. American clientele now enjoy a permanent home in the States in a pied-à-terre in New York with antique Huntsman tweed covered furnishings and historic photographs from Huntsman's past adorning the walls.

Alongside regular visits to the east coast of America, visiting clients based in New York City, Boston and Washington (as well as Chicago), the house also undertakes regular west coast tours, visiting San Francisco and Los Angeles. Huntsman expanded its trunk shows, pioneering visits to different corners of Asia, including a trunk show in Seoul and visits to Tokyo, Singapore, Hong Kong and Beijing.

With daytime fashion in mind, 2016 featured a busy social calendar for Huntsman. The house participated in the polo and racing seasons with the highlights being Huntsman's Royal Ascot residence on the Rosebery, as well as the house's post-racing party. 2016 also saw Huntsman taking on more modern projects including cutting bespoke tweed driving suits for Marc Newson and Charlotte Stockdale in the 2016 Mille Miglia Race.

Huntsman's Savile Row premises play host to a variety of exciting events, including charity auctions for several worthy causes, which have raised up to £80,000 in donations. Exhibitions for artists such as Cecil Beaton, Alex Talbot Rice and Gray Malin were hosted by the house, as well as whisky tastings, private lunches, and book launches

In 2016, over half a million people tuned in live to learn all things bespoke from Huntsman owner Pierre Lagrange at an event in Beijing. In February, Huntsman even graced the London Fashion Week catwalk as a part of the inspired Gareth Pugh show. The ‘Treasures from Chatsworth’, a miniseries presented by Huntsman and produced by Sotheby's, was launched in 2016 too - detailing the magnificent collections of the Cavendish family whilst also putting a spotlight on how contemporary Huntsman's age-old bespoke craftsmanship is.
