= Noam Gottesman =

American businessman

- נועם גוטסמן
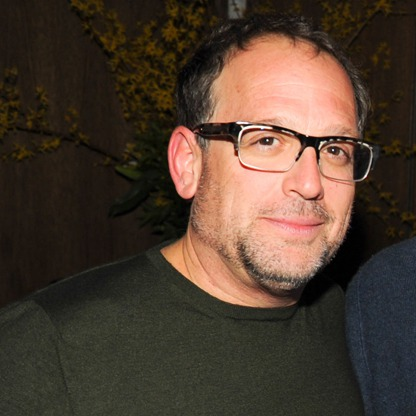
- Born: May 1961 (age 65); Israel
- Citizenship: United States, United Kingdom, Israel
- Education: Columbia University
- Occupation: Hedge fund manager
- Known for: Co-founder of GLG Partners
- Spouses: Geraldine Gottesman (divorced); Bianca Dueñas (m. 2015)
- Children: 5
- Parent: Dov Gottesman

Noam Gottesman (Hebrew: נועם גוטסמן; born May 1961) is a New York City-based, British-American businessman, former hedge fund manager, and co-founder of GLG Partners. He later entered the restaurant industry, investing in establishments including Eleven Madison Park in New York City. He is also the CEO of TOMS Capital. Gottesman has dual citizenship in the US and UK, and was listed on the 2020 Forbes 400 list of richest people in the United States, with a net worth of $2.4 billion.

== Early life and education ==
Gottesman was born in May 1961, to a Jewish family, the son of Israel Museum president Dov Gottesman. He received a BA from Columbia University in 1986.

== Career ==
Gottesman worked at the Goldman Sachs London office and became its executive director while managing global equity portfolios for their private client group. He left Goldman Sachs in 1995 with Pierre Lagrange and Jonathan Green to co-found GLG Partners. The company went on to manage $24.6 billion and become a publicly traded entity on the New York Stock Exchange (November 2007) and had up to $24.6 billion in assets under management. Gottesman and his partners sold the company to the Man Group in October 2010 for $1.6 billion. Gottesman remained co-CEO of GLG until January 2012, when he stepped down to become non-executive chairman of its U.S. business. Gottesman is the CEO of the investment company TOMS Capital.

== Philanthropy ==
He is a trustee at his alma mater Columbia University and as board member at the Tate Gallery Foundation. Gottesman is on the Chairman's Council of the Metropolitan Museum of Art, and the international council of the Museum of Modern Art. He has sat on the board of trustees of New York-Presbyterian Hospital of since 2017 Other activities include ownership of the restaurants Eleven Madison Park, which has been voted the number 1 restaurant in the world by The World's 50 Best Restaurants magazine publication, and Shuko, which New York Magazine voted the "Best Sushi in New York". He also owns Nomad, and the eponymous investment vehicle also named "Nomad" that he cofounded, which purchased Iglo Group, purveyor of Birds Eye Frozen Products.

== Personal life ==
Gottesman married Geraldine Gottesman and had four children. They later divorced.

Gottesman comes from a family of art collectors, and is among the 200 most notable collectors according to ARTnews. He owns pieces by Francis Bacon and Lucian Freud and Andy Warhol.

In 2014, he was dating the actress Lucy Liu. In 2015, Gottesman married Bianca Dueñas, director of sales for fashion designer Reed Krakoff.

In July 2019, Gottesman was accused of illegally carving out a personal driveway in front of his Greenwich Village townhouse. The accusations were first reported on the front page of the New York Daily News. The New York Department of Buildings later issued a statement acknowledging that there was a pre-existing curb cut and loading dock at the building before it was converted into a home, and that Gottesman had received plan approval in 2011 to keep the curb cut and a fold-up garage door.
