= Liselotte Grschebina =

Israeli photographer

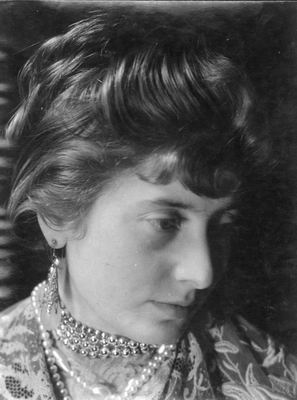
- Born: Liselotte Billigheimer; May 2, 1908; Karlsruhe, German Empire (now Germany)
- Died: June 14, 1994 (aged 86); Petah Tikva, Israel
- Education: School of Applied Arts in Stuttgart
- Known for: Photographer
- Spouse: Jacob (Jasha) Grschebin

Liselotte Grschebina (Hebrew: גרז'בינה / גרשבינה ליזלוטה; 1908–1994; née Liselotte Billigheimer, also known as Grjebina) was a German-born Israeli photographer that her work reflected German modernist photography, which she incorporated into Israeli photography.

== Early life and education ==
Liselotte Grschebina was born Liselotte Billigheimer in 1908 in Karlsruhe, Germany. Her parents were Rosa and Otto Billigheimer, a Jewish couple. Her father was killed in 1916 while serving in the German army. In 1925–29 Grschebina studied painting and graphic design at the local art academy, Badische Landeskunstschule Karlsruhe (BLK; now the Staatliche Akademie der Bildenden Künste Karlsruhe) and studied commercial photography at the School of Applied Arts in Stuttgart.

== Career ==
=== Beginnings in Germany ===
In 1929 Grschebina began to teach photography in the advertising course, Badische Landeskunstschule Karlsruhe (BLK). In January 1932 she opens Bilfoto, her own studio, announcing her specialisation in child photography, and takes on students. In 1933, following the Nazis come to power and the restrictions on professional freedom for Jews, Grschebina closed her studio. Before leaving Germany, she married Dr. Jacob (Jasha) Grschebin.

=== Mandate Palestine and Israel ===
The Grschebin couple reaches Tel Aviv in March 1934. The same year, Grschebina opens the Ishon studio on Allenby Street with her friend Ellen Rosenberg (Auerbach), previously a partner in the Berlin photographic studio ringl + pit. In 1936 the Ishon studio is closed when Rosenberg leaves the country; Grschebina continues to work from her home.

In 1934–47 Grschebina is appointed the official photographer for the Zionist women's organization WIZO. In 1939, together with fellow photographers of German origin gathered in Tel Aviv, establishes the Palestine Professional Photographers Association (PPPA), the first independent photographers organisation in the country. Between the 1930s to 1950s Grschebina takes photographs for Palestine Railways, the large dairy company Tnuva, kibbutzim, and various private businesses.

Liselotte Grschebina died in Petah Tikva at the age of 86, on June 14, 1994.

== Style ==
Grschebina arrived in Palestine in 1934, a trained professional profoundly influenced by the revolutionary movements of the Weimar Republic: New Objectivity in painting and New Vision in photography, as well as by a number of prominent professors, including Karl Hubbuch and de:Wilhelm Schnarrenberger. Unlike many of her colleagues in Palestine, who sought their identities in the collective Zionist endeavor by documenting and extolling it in their work, Grschebina did not use photography as a means of forming her identity. She came with a full-fledged style and remained committed to Weimar artistic ideals and principles in her new home, where she continued to apply and develop them. This exhibition premieres a major selection from among the 1,800 photographs that were given to the Israel Museum and unveils her life and work to the public for the first time. Grschebina's artistic roots clearly lay in New Vision, which defined photography as an artistic field in its own right and called on camera artists to portray subjects in a new, different way to convey their unique qualities and their essence. She did this through striking vantage points and strong diagonals, making masterful use of mirrors, reflections, and plays of light and shadow to create geometric shapes and to endow her photographs with atmosphere, appeal, and meaning.

In Germany, most of her photographs – usually advertising commissions – were taken in the studio. In the land of Israel, she also worked outdoors, observing those around her with a clear, impartial eye. She photographed people going about their daily routine, unaffected by the presence of the camera. The viewer of her pictures feels like an outsider looking in, gaining a new, objective perspective on the subject: the "objective portrait . . . not encumbered with subjective intention" wherein, according to New Vision photographer László Moholy-Nagy, lies the genius of photography.

== Legacy ==
The photographs of Liselotte Grschebina were rediscovered in storage at her son's Tel Aviv apartment six years after her death.

The archive of Liselotte Grschebina's photographs were given to the Israel Museum by her son, Beni Gjebin and his wife Rina, from Shoham, with the assistance of Rachel and Dov Gottesman, the museum president between 2001 and 2011.

== Gallery ==
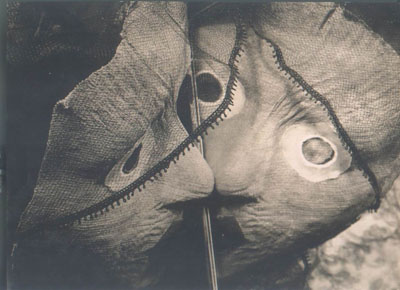
Masks, ca. 1930
Israel Museum Collection
B01.0244(0077)

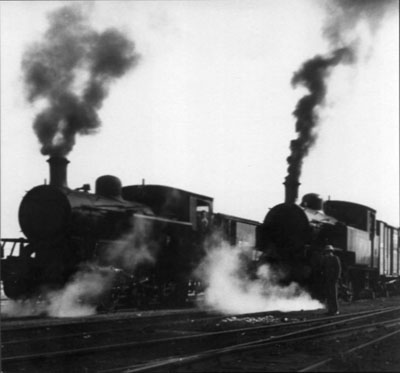
At the railroad interchange, Lod
Photograph for Palestine Railways, ca. 1940
Israel Museum Collection
B01.0244(0104)

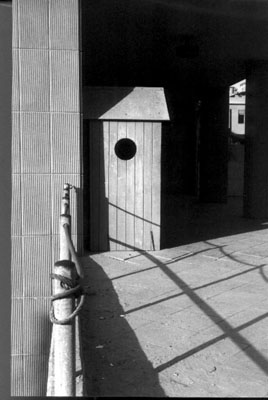
Rosh Hanikra, ca. 1960
Israel Museum Collection
B01.0244(0129)

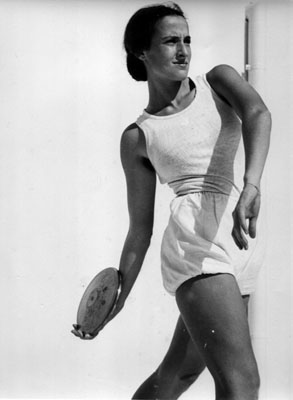
Sports in Israel
Discus Thrower, 1937
Israel Museum Collection
B01.0244(1823)

== Exhibitions ==
- 1937 – Takes part in an international exhibition in Paris
- 1938 – Takes part in the group exhibition "Old Life – New Life" by photogroup T’munah (Hebrew for picture) from the Berlin Zionist Association (BZV) shown at their site in Kantstraße
- 1941 – Takes part in the PPPA's group exhibition held in Logos, a Tel Aviv bookshop rearranged as gallery space
- 2000, Summer – Time Frame: A Century of Photography in the Land of Israel, Israel Museum, Jerusalem
- 2005 – The New Hebrews – 100 Years of Israeli Art, Martin-Gropius-Bau, Berlin
- 2008, October–December – Woman with a Camera: Liselotte Grschebina, Germany 1908 – Israel 1994, Ticho House
- 2009 – Eine Frau Mit Kamera: Liselotte Grschebina, Deutschland 1908 – 1994 Israel. Eine Ausstellung des Israel Museums, Jerusalem. Curator: Yudit Caplan, Martin-Gropius-Bau, Berlin
