= David Munro Anderson =

Scottish businessman (born 1937)

- Born: 15 December 1937 (age 88)
- Education: Morrison's Academy; Strathallan School
- Occupation: Businessman
- Known for: Involvement in creation of London's futures contract trading industry
- Military career
- Allegiance: United Kingdom
- Branch: British Army
- Unit: Black Watch
- Deployment: West Africa

David Munro Anderson (born 15 December 1937) is a Scottish businessman with a distinguished career in the City of London. He was closely involved in the development of the futures contract trading industry in London. Anderson was chairman of the formation committee for the International Petroleum Exchange, joint chairman of the formation committee for the Baltic International Freight Futures Exchange and former vice-chairman of the London Commodity Exchange. As a director of the Securities and Investments Board (SIB) he played a key role in implementing the Financial Services Act 1986 in the United Kingdom.

== Education ==
Anderson was educated at Morrison's Academy and Strathallan School in Perthshire. He was commissioned in the Black Watch and served in West Africa. He worked in tea production with James Findlay & Company in India between 1959 and 1962 before briefly joining the London Chamber of Commerce and Industry for one year.

== Career ==
In 1963 Anderson joined ED&F Man Ltd, which had been established as a sugar trader in London in 1783. Over the years the company would trade in a diverse range of commodities. In 1971 he founded one of the first independent privately owned futures brokers in London, and developed the concept of investment management in futures and options. In 1974 he launched one of the first futures and options funds in the world. Anderson sold his interests in his own company and in 1981 established along with ED&F Man Ltd, the futures broking, stock broking and investment management company, Anderson Man Limited, ED&F Man Ltd's first move into the futures market.

Anderson was responsible for the development of the alternative investment management business and played a leading role in the development of the structured/guaranteed wrapper for derivative investment products. In 1985 Anderson Man Limited evolved into ED&F Man International Limited with Anderson as chairman from 1986–1990 and later into Man Financial. ED&F Man Ltd listed on the London Stock Exchange in 1984 and changed its name to the Man Group in 2000. ED&F Man Ltd, the commodities business, separated from the Man Group in the same year following a management buyout. Man Financial remained part of the Man Group.

In 1980 Anderson was appointed the chairman of the formation committee for the International Petroleum Exchange (IPE) in London. The Exchange was founded by a group of energy and futures companies in response to the instability of the price of oil; their first futures contract was launched in 1981. The IPE would become one of the largest energy futures and options exchanges in the world. In 2001, it was acquired by the Atlanta-based Intercontinental Exchange (ICE), and is presently called Ice Futures Europe.

Anderson was also joint chairman on the formation committee of the Baltic International Freight Futures Exchange (BIFFEX) based in London, a market for trading futures contracts relating to the cost of transporting dry basic materials by sea in 1985. The market gave owners and charterers the ability to protect themselves from fluctuating freight rates. Initially the exchange was moderately successful, however contracts ceased trading due to a lack of liquidity in 2001.

In 1986 Anderson was appointed a director of the Securities and Investments Board and oversaw the implementation of the Financial Services Act 1986. The aim of the Act was to regulate the financial services industry using a mixture of government regulation and self-regulation. The Act created the Securities and Investments Board which presided over various self-regulation organisations (SRO's). The Act forced all the Baltic futures markets to unite under the banner of the Baltic Futures Association and trading was re-located to the London Commodity Exchange. Anderson was also vice-chairman of the London Commodity Exchange.

In 1990 Anderson became chairman of Anderson Quantrend Limited. He has also held numerous senior executive positions and is a member of the Chartered Institute for Securities & Investment. Anderson was founder and chairman of the Association for Futures Investment and a former council member of the Association of Futures Brokers and Dealers, which became part of the Financial Services Authority.
