= Tower Hamlets Environment Trust =

- Founded: 19 July 1979; 47 years ago
- Defunct: 7 November 2023
- Registration no.: Company number 01438582; Charity number 289632
- Legal status: Charity
- Location: London, United Kingdom

Tower Hamlets Environment Trust, also known as the Environment Trust, was a registered charity and development trust which, from 1979 until its closure in 2008, was based in the London Borough of Tower Hamlets. It aimed to achieve sustainable development by improving the social, economic and physical environment for community benefit.

The Environment Trust helped to establish Fair Finance, a community development financial institution, which offered a range of financial packages to disadvantaged community members in the East End of London.

The Trust researched and developed renewable energy schemes, including solar, wind, biofuels, and tidal energy, and offered educational workshops in schools around themes of biodiversity, nature and gardening. Through organised events, it assisted people in becoming more involved in improving and using their local green spaces. It also worked with partners and communities to try to effect change in local and national government policy on public spaces and biodiversity.

The organisation provided affordable, environmentally sustainable housing through its green homes schemes. It developed a practical approach to building energy efficient homes with low running costs, which were then sold at 70% of their market value.

The organisation also worked to increase the number of quality, affordable workspaces available to local social enterprises, by acquiring land and properties at discounted cost and transforming them into suitable workspace, which were then developed in line with the Green Homes Specification.

== See also ==
- Environment Trust for Richmond upon Thames, now Habitats & Heritage
