= Elba DOC =

Italian controlled red wine origin on Elba

Elba is a Denominazione di origine controllata (DOC) wine made from grapes grown on the island of Elba, in the region of Tuscany, Italy. Elba wine can be red, white or sweet, the latter being the island's own version of vin santo. The Elba DOC was created in 1967. Elba rosso is a minimum of 60% sangiovese, while Elba bianco may encompasses several different blends of grapes, of which include Ansonica, Trebbiano Toscano, Vermentino and other white grapes. Rosso riserva wines must be aged for a minimum of two years, including six months in bottle.
