= Dov Gottesman =

Israeli art collector

- דב גוטסמן
- Born: May 1, 1929
- Died: February 22, 2011 (aged 81); New York City, U.S.
- Occupation: Art collector
- Title: President, Israel Museum
- Term: 2001-11
- Spouse: Rachel Gottesman
- Children: 3, including Noam Gottesman

Dov Gottesman (Hebrew: דב גוטסמן; May 1, 1929 - February 22, 2011) was an Israeli art collector, and president of the Israel Museum from 2001 until his death in 2011.

Dov Gottesman lived in New York, London, Geneva and Tel Aviv. He was married to Rachel, and they had three sons, Assaf, Noam and Yoav. He died on 22 February 2011, at his home in New York, aged 82.

In 1996, Gottesman became chairman of the Israel Museum, and in 2001, succeeded Teddy Kollek as president.
