= GLG Partners =

Investment management company

- Company type: Subsidiary
- Industry: Investment management
- Founded: 1995; 31 years ago
- Founders: Noam Gottesman; Pierre Lagrange; Jonathan Green
- Headquarters: London, United Kingdom
- Area served: Worldwide
- AUM: US$35.4 billion (2022)
- Number of employees: 71 (2022)
- Parent: Man Group
- Website: www.man.com/glg

Man GLG (formerly GLG Partners) is a discretionary investment manager and a wholly owned subsidiary of British alternative investment manager Man Group plc. It is a diversified and multi-strategy fund manager that operates strategies including equity long-short funds, convertible arbitrage funds, emerging market funds and long-only mutual funds. The firm is also a founding member of the Hedge Fund Standards Board and a signatory of the Principles for Responsible investment. As of 2022, Man GLG had $35.4 billion assets under management.

== History ==
GLG was founded in 1995 by Noam Gottesman, Pierre Lagrange and Jonathan Green, as a unit of Lehman Brothers. The three founders met while working in Goldman Sachs' private client business in the 1980s.

GLG was spun off by Lehman in 2000 before going public in 2007 through a reverse merger with Freedom Acquisition Holdings. At the time of the merger, GLG Partners Inc was valued at £3.3 billion, the then-largest alternative investment manager in Europe. In April 2009, GLG Partners acquired Société Générale Asset Management UK, adding $8.2 billion in AUM and increasing GLG's exposure to the UK retail market.

Man Group plc acquired GLG Partners in May 2010, paying $1.6 billion ($4.50 per share) in cash and new shares. The merger was the largest acquisition in hedge fund industry. The acquisition was finalised on 14 October 2010.

In 2015 Man GLG acquired Silvermine Capital Management, a US-based investment advisor, as well as NewSmith LLP, an equity investment manager. Man GLG reportedly paid an initial $23.5 million for Silvermine; the acquisition was said by Hedgeweek to provide Man GLG with more expertise in US credit markets and expand the firm’s North American presence. The Telegraph noted that the NewSmith acquisition would extend Man GLG's presence in the Japanese market.

In December 2013, Man GLG settled charges brought by the SEC after a failure of the firm's internal controls caused it to overvalue its stake in a coal mining company. GLG did not admit or deny the charges. In January 2014 the billionaire investor Richard Desmond sued GLG and Credit Suisse over losses stemming from investments that Desmond stated were "too complex to understand". GLG denied advising Desmond on the transaction; the firm also argued that Desmond was in fact a sophisticated investor, having invested over $15 million with GLG since 1998. The case was settled out of court in 2015.
