= James Man =

English sugar-broker and rum merchant (1755–1823)

James Man (1755–1823) was the founder of Man Group.

Born in Whitechapel and apprenticed to a William Humphrey as a barrel maker, James Man decided to establish his own business as a sugar-broker in 1783.

In 1784, he secured a contract to supply the Royal Navy with rum. This business grew into Man Group, a substantial investment management business. He retired in 1819 and moved to Dartmouth, Devon, where he died in 1823.

== Family ==
James Man married Sarah Roberts in 1781.
