= Islay Woollen Mill =

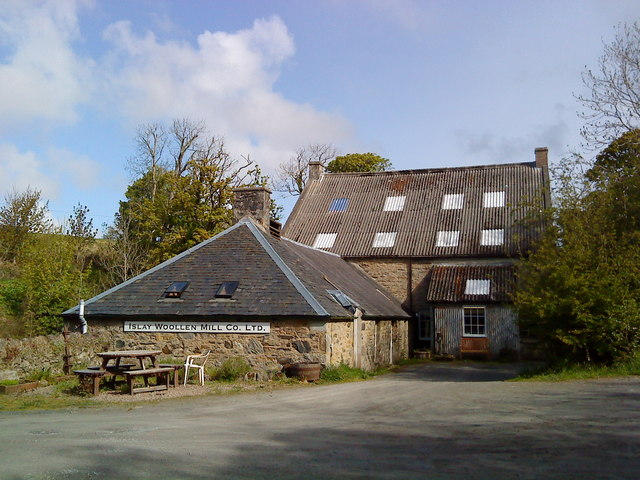
- Islay Woollen Mill
- Interactive map of the Islay Woollen Mill area

General information
- Location: Redhouses, Islay, Scotland
- Coordinates: 55°47′22″N 6°13′32″W
- Construction started: 1883

Website
- islaywoollenmill.co.uk

Listed Building – Category A
- Designated: 3 June 1987
- Reference no.: LB12143

Islay Woollen Mill is a Category A listed mill building near the Scottish village of Bridgend, Islay, Argyll and Bute.

== History and architecture ==
The mill was built in 1883 and remains unusually complete with waterwheel and early machinery including two Dobcross looms dating from the 1920s.

The mill has been run by Gordon and Sheila Covell since 1981. Some of the tweed produced at the mill has been used in films, including Far and Away, Braveheart, Rob Roy, and Forrest Gump.

It was visited by Prince Charles on 29 June 1994.
