= East London Business Alliance =

East London Business Alliance (ELBA)
- Formation: 1992; 34 years ago
- Type: Non-profit organization
- Purpose: Regeneration; Employee volunteering CSR
- Location: London, E14
- Region served: Tower Hamlets; Hackney; Newham; Waltham Forest; Islington
- Website: East London Business Alliance (ELBA)

East London Business Alliance (ELBA) is a British business-community outreach charity promoting corporate social responsibility (CSR) and employee volunteering. A 'partnership of substantial businesses engaged in the social and economic regeneration of East London', it operates in the Boroughs of Tower Hamlets, Hackney, Newham, Waltham Forest, and, under the name the BIG Alliance, in Islington.

ELBA works with over 100 London companies committed to improving their impact on society. Education, local employment, and using business skills in the community are ELBA's three main focus areas.

== History ==
In the 1990s, ELBA was known as the East London Partnership. A smaller group of around 37 companies, its work was focused on business leaders' involvement in local partnerships in Newham, Tower Hamlets and Hackney.

From 1995, in partnership with The Environment Trust and London Borough of Tower Hamlets, ELBA was involved in the creation of Mile End Park.

In 2012, Islington Giving invited ELBA to create a business-supported employee volunteer programme in Islington, called the Businesses for Islington Giving (BIG) Alliance.

In 2013, ELBA's recruitment agency London Works, launched as a social enterprise to 'help talented people from low income backgrounds into their first role in London's financial and business services sector', received a £100,000 grant from the Mayor of London's London Enterprise Panel.

== Competitors and alternatives ==
There are a number of alternatives to ELBA which offer corporate volunteering and these include:

- Benefacto: Which concentrates on offering high-value volunteering experiences for small groups of corporate volunteers
- Volunteering Matters: Which offers a similar service to ELBA with a wider geographical scope
