= Elba Township =

Elba Township may refer to the following places in the United States:

- Elba Township, Knox County, Illinois
- Elba Township, Gratiot County, Michigan
- Elba Township, Lapeer County, Michigan
- Elba Township, Winona County, Minnesota
