= Man Group =

British investment management business

Man Group plc

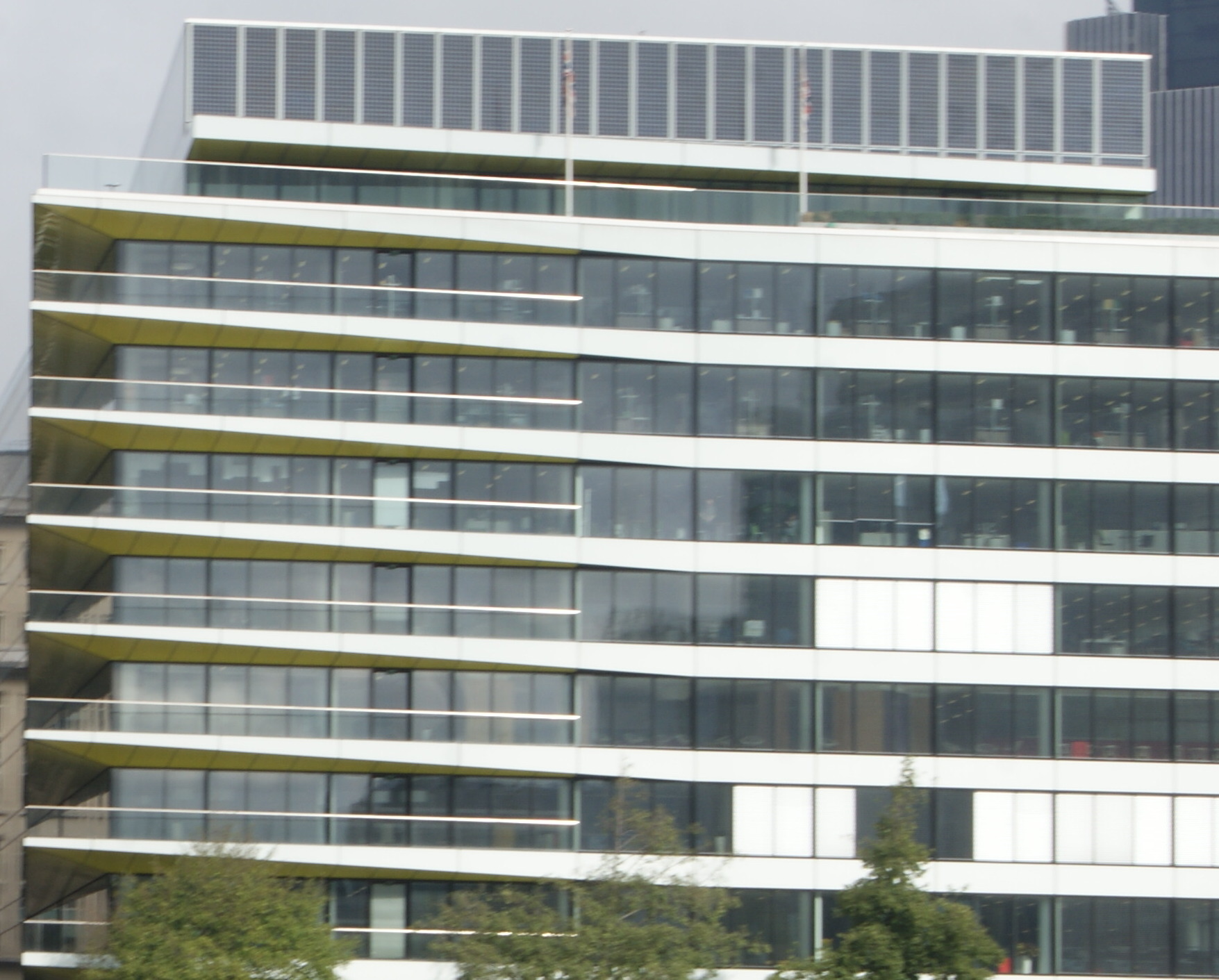
- Head office at Riverbank House in London
- Type: Public
- Traded as: LSE: EMG; FTSE 250 component
- ISIN: GB00B83VD954
- Industry: Financial services
- Founded: 1783; 243 years ago
- Founder: James Man
- Headquarters: London, United Kingdom
- Area served: Worldwide
- Key people: Anne Wade Chairman; Robyn Grew, CEO; Antoine Forterre, CFO
- Products: Investment products
- Revenue: ▼US$1,405 million (2025)
- Operating income: ▼US$257 million (2025)
- Net income: ▼US$175 million (2025)
- AUM: US$227.6 Billion (2025)
- Website: www.man.com

Man Group plc is an active investment management business listed on the London Stock Exchange. It provides investment funds in liquid and private markets for institutional and private investors. It is the world's largest publicly traded hedge fund company, reporting $178.2 billion in funds under management as of June 2024. The firm is headquartered at Riverbank House in London and employs over 1,800 people in various locations. The company was a sponsor of the Man Booker Prize from 2002 to 2019.

== History ==
The company was founded by James Man in 1783 as a sugar cooperage and brokerage, based in Harp Lane in Billingsgate. The following year Man Group won the contract to supply the Royal Navy with rum for its daily rum ration, a tradition under which all sailors were allocated a daily rum ration. This tradition continued until 1970, with Man Group holding the contract throughout. The company expanded from sugar and rum into other commodities such as coffee and cocoa. The company traded as a commodities business throughout the 19th and 20th century, gradually diversifying into financial services following the advent of financial exchanges to hedge commodity exposures.

The firm was renamed ED&F Man in 1869, based on the initials of James Man's grandsons Edward Desborough Man and Fredrick Man. ED&F Man listed on the London Stock Exchange in 1994. In 2000 the company divided into two separate businesses, with Man Group plc focusing on financial services and ED&F Man (the commodities division) taken private in a management buy-out.

In 2007 Man Group transitioned to an investment management business, following the demerger and flotation of its brokerage business (known as MF Global) on the New York Stock Exchange. Man Group attained its current structure through acquisitions. Man AHL, founded by Cyril Adam, David Harding, and Martin Leuck, was acquired from 1989 to 1994. Man Group's other investment managers were formed via acquisition between 2010 and 2017, beginning with the 2010 acquisition of Man GLG (previously GLG Partners) for $1.6 billion, followed by Man FRM in 2012, Man Numeric in 2014, Man GPM in 2017 and Man Varagon (previously Varagon Capital Partners) in 2023.

In late 2017, Man Group announced the creation of a quantitative hedge fund in China. The firm has held licenses to operate in the country since 2012, but was provided clearance to operate as a private securities investment fund manager. Man is one of the first systematic investment managers to receive this accreditation. The fund was to be managed by Man's AHL division. In 2020, Man AHL received approval for a Qualified Foreign Institutional Investor ("QFII") license in China.

== Operations ==
Man Group employs over 675 staff, offers over 85 investment strategies across a variety of investment approaches, styles and asset classes, and trades in over 825 markets around the world.

== Senior management ==
Robyn Grew was appointed as Man Group's CEO in 2023, succeeding Luke Ellis who had held the role since September 2016.

In September 2023, Man Group announced a number of changes to its senior management. Anne Wade was appointed as chair of the board. She replaced John Cryan who been chair of the board since January 2020. In 2024 Man Group announced the appointment of Dixit Joshi and Sarah Legg as non-executive directors of the Company

=== Mergers and acquisitions ===
| Table of Man Group mergers and acquisitions | Date |
|---|---|
| AHL | 1989–94 |
| Glenwood Capital Investment LLC, Glenwood Global Management LLC and remaining 40% stake in Man Glenwood GmbHGroup | Nov 2000 |
| Ord Minnett Strategic Investments | Dec 2000 |
| RMF Investment Group | May 2002 |
| BlueCrest Capital Management Ltd (minority stake, sold in 2011) | Dec 2003 |
| Pemba Credit Advisers, an asset manager specialising in European credit portfolios | April 2007 |
| 50% interest in Ore Hill Partners LLC, a provider of Investment Management Services. Concurrently Ore Hill agreed to acquire a 50% stake in Pemba Credit Advisers Ltd from Man Group | Mar 2008 |
| Man ECO specialising in financing environmentally related projects (Man Environmental Capital Opportunities) | April 2008 |
| Nephila Capital Ltd | June 2008 |
| GLG Partners | May 2010 |
| FRM Holdings | July 2012 |
| Pine Grove Asset Management | Aug 2014 |
| Numeric Holdings | Sept 2014 |
| Fund-of-funds assets from Merrill Lynch Alternative Investments | May 2015 |
| Silvermine Capital Management | Jan 2015 |
| NewSmith LLP's investment management operations | May 2015 |
| Aalto | Oct 2016 |

== RMF and Bernard Madoff ==
RMF, a former division of Man Group, invested 0.5% of its funds under management at the time with various third-party funds which, in turn, had positions in funds ultimately managed by Bernard Madoff. RMF was one of 107 financial institutions and 13,000 individuals to invest in such funds. As of 2014, 59% of all such funds have been recovered and returned to various institutions and individuals.

== Man Booker Prize ==
Man Group sponsored the Man Booker literary prize from 2002 to 2019. Described by The Telegraph as "...arguably the UK's most prestigious" literary prize, the £50,000 award was created in 1973 to increase the reading of quality fiction and attract "the intelligent general audience".

== Corporate responsibility ==
Man Group supports various charitable initiatives focused on promoting education, which are run primarily through the Man Charitable Trust and the Man US Charitable Foundation.

=== Man Charitable Trust and the Man US Charitable Foundation ===
Set up in 1978, the Man Charitable Trust is an independent UK registered charity that funds small to medium-size charities focusing on literacy and numeracy programmes. It also funds programmes in support of access to education for disadvantaged people. In 2019, Man Group launched the Man US Charitable Foundation to provide funding and volunteering opportunities in the US. In 2021, Man Group donated $4 million to both charities.

=== Oxford-Man Institute ===
In June 2007 Man launched a joint project with the University of Oxford, the Oxford-Man Institute of Quantitative Finance. Man Group's initial financial commitment to the institute was £13.75 million, one of the largest single donations to a British higher education institution in recent years. In 2016 the Oxford-Man Institute expanded its focus on machine learning and data analytics, becoming part of the University of Oxford's Department of Engineering Science. The development of the OMI's focus creates a hub for machine learning and data analysis at Eagle House, the current home of the OMI and Man AHL's Oxford Research lab.

In December 2019, the University of Oxford and Man Group announced that funding support for the Oxford-Man Institute (OMI) had been agreed for a further five years.

=== Man and Fideuram - Intesa Sanpaolo Private Banking ===
In 2023 Man Group established a strategic asset management partnership with Fideuram – Intesa Sanpaolo Private Banking designed to generate innovative new investment opportunities for F-ISPB's clients. The agreement saw Man Group take a 51% interest in Asteria, a Geneva-based, ESG–oriented asset manager, including its existing fund range.

=== Man and Columbia Centre partnership ===
In 2023 Man Group announced its partnership with the Columbia Center on Sustainable Investment to conduct research addressing how climate impact is defined and measured in fixed income and equity portfolios.

=== Former sponsorships and charitable initiatives ===
Man Group is a former sponsor of the Man Group International Climate Change Award and the Man Asian Literary Prize. In the 1990s, Man was a founding member of the East London Partnership, which became the East London Business Alliance, a business-community outreach charity promoting corporate social responsibility and employee volunteering.

== See also ==
- List of investors in Bernard L. Madoff Securities
