= Listed buildings in Burford, Oxfordshire =

Buildings in Burford, Oxfordshire, England

Burford is a town and civil parish in Oxfordshire, England. It contains 261 listed buildings that are recorded in the National Heritage List for England. Of these two are grade I, 33 are grade II* and 226 are grade II.

This list is based on the information retrieved online from Historic England.

== Key ==
Grade	Criteria
I	Buildings that are of exceptional interest
II*	Particularly important buildings of more than special interest
II	Buildings that are of special interest

== Listing ==
Name	Grade	Location	Type	Completed (Note: The date given is the date used by Historic England as significant for the initial building or that of an important part in the structure's description.)	Date designated	Grid ref. (Note: The grid reference is based on the British national grid reference system, sometimes known as OSGB36, used by the Ordnance Survey.) Geo-coordinates	Notes	Entry number (Note: The "List Entry Number" is a unique number assigned to each listed building and scheduled monument by Historic England.)	Image	Wikidata
Arthur White Tomb about 20 Metres West of Church of St John	II	Church Lane			1 March 1990	SP2527912418; 51°48′35″N 1°38′05″W		1197982	Upload Photo	Q26492428
Bale Tomb about 17 Metres South West of Porch of Church of St John	II	Church Lane			1 March 1990	SP2529012391; 51°48′35″N 1°38′04″W		1284080	Upload Photo	Q26572885
Bale Tomb about 2 Metres South West of Kempster Memorial	II	Church Lane			1 March 1990	SP2529612390; 51°48′34″N 1°38′04″W		1183359	Upload Photo	Q26478551
Bale Tomb about 4 Metres South of Blocked Entrance to Guild Chapel of Church of St John	II	Church Lane			1 March 1990	SP2528712393; 51°48′35″N 1°38′05″W		1183413	Upload Photo	Q26478600
Bale Tomb about 5 Metres South East of Porch of Church of St John	II	Church Lane			1 March 1990	SP2530712387; 51°48′34″N 1°38′04″W		1367821	Bale Tomb about 5 Metres South East of Porch of Church of St John More images	Q26649299
Bale Tomb about 5 Metres West of Kempster Memorial	II	Church Lane			1 March 1990	SP2529312390; 51°48′34″N 1°38′04″W		1053289	Upload Photo	Q26305014
Bale Tomb about 6 Metres West South West of Kempster Memorial	II	Church Lane			1 March 1990	SP2529212388; 51°48′34″N 1°38′04″W		1183365	Upload Photo	Q26478557
Bale Tomb about 9 Metres South West of Porch of Church St John	II	Church Lane			1 March 1990	SP2529712387; 51°48′34″N 1°38′04″W		1053288	Upload Photo	Q26305013
Bale Tomb of West Richardson Faulkner about 6 Metres South of South Transept of Church of St John	II	Church Lane			1 March 1990	SP2531412386; 51°48′34″N 1°38′03″W		1367820	Bale Tomb of West Richardson Faulkner about 6 Metres South of South Transept of Church of St John More images	Q26649298
Burford Grammar School (main Part Including Lenthall House)	II*	Church Lane			12 September 1955	SP2526412371; 51°48′34″N 1°38′06″W		1267149	Upload Photo	Q17532785
Chest Tomb about 15 Metres South of Priest's Door of Church of St John	II	Church Lane			1 March 1990	SP2532412380; 51°48′34″N 1°38′03″W		1197967	Upload Photo	Q26492408
Chest Tomb about 15 Metres South of South Transept of Church of St John	II	Church Lane			1 March 1990	SP2531612379; 51°48′34″N 1°38′03″W		1367823	Upload Photo	Q26649301
Chest Tomb about 17 Metres South South East of Porch of Church of St John	II	Church Lane			1 March 1990	SP2531112376; 51°48′34″N 1°38′03″W		1367824	Upload Photo	Q26649302
Chest Tomb about 18 Metres South West of Porch of Church of St John	II	Church Lane			1 March 1990	SP2529012388; 51°48′34″N 1°38′04″W		1053290	Upload Photo	Q26305015
Chest Tomb about 3 Metres South West of Porch of Church of St John	II	Church Lane			1 March 1990	SP2529912391; 51°48′35″N 1°38′04″W		1183353	Upload Photo	Q26478546
Chest Tomb about 8 Metres South East of Porch of Church of St John	II	Church Lane			1 March 1990	SP2530912385; 51°48′34″N 1°38′03″W		1367822	Upload Photo	Q26649300
Chest Tomb about 9 Metres South South East of Porch of Church of St John	II	Church Lane			1 March 1990	SP2530612385; 51°48′34″N 1°38′04″W		1053257	Chest Tomb about 9 Metres South South East of Porch of Church of St John More images	Q26304984
Chest Tomb Immediately South of Minchin Memorial	II	Church Lane			1 March 1990	SP2529312383; 51°48′34″N 1°38′04″W		1183416	Upload Photo	Q26478603
Church of St John the Baptist	I	Church Lane			12 September 1955	SP2531312402; 51°48′35″N 1°38′03″W		1053287	Church of St John the Baptist More images	Q17529264
Church Schools	II	Church Lane			12 September 1955	SP2530212359; 51°48′33″N 1°38′04″W		1367800	Church Schools More images	Q26649278
Dove Cottage	II	Church Lane			11 March 1976	SP2531612315; 51°48′32″N 1°38′03″W		1367801	Upload Photo	Q26649279
Elizabeth and Henry Sules Bale Tomb about 7 Metres South South East of Porch of Church of St John	II	Church Lane			1 March 1990	SP2530312387; 51°48′34″N 1°38′04″W		1053256	Upload Photo	Q26304982
Elizabeth White Memorial about 14 Metres West South West of Porch of Church of St John	II	Church Lane			1 March 1990	SP2529112393; 51°48′35″N 1°38′04″W		1053291	Upload Photo	Q26305016
Fysshers Croft	II	Church Lane			11 March 1976	SP2529312330; 51°48′33″N 1°38′04″W		1053286	Fysshers Croft More images	Q26305012
House Adjacent and to East of Number 31 High Street	II	Church Lane			12 September 1955	SP2520512353; 51°48′33″N 1°38′09″W		1052153	House Adjacent and to East of Number 31 High Street More images	Q26303955
John Huntt Chest Tomb about 4 Metres South East of Porch of Church of St John	II	Church Lane			1 March 1990	SP2530712389; 51°48′34″N 1°38′04″W		1053255	John Huntt Chest Tomb about 4 Metres South East of Porch of Church of St John More images	Q26304981
Kempster Bale Tomb about 6 Metres South West of Porch of Church of St John	II	Church Lane			1 March 1990	SP2529812390; 51°48′34″N 1°38′04″W		1367802	Upload Photo	Q26649280
Kennet (?) Memorial about 10 Metres South South East of Porch of Church of St John	II	Church Lane			1 March 1990	SP2530412384; 51°48′34″N 1°38′04″W		1053258	Kennet (?) Memorial about 10 Metres South South East of Porch of Church of St John More images	Q26304985
Minchin Memorial about 19 Metres South West of Porch of Church of St John	II	Church Lane			1 March 1990	SP2529412385; 51°48′34″N 1°38′04″W		1053292	Upload Photo	Q26305017
Patrick Monument about 5 Metres South of South Transept of Church of St John	II	Church Lane			1 March 1990	SP2531712386; 51°48′34″N 1°38′03″W		1053254	Patrick Monument about 5 Metres South of South Transept of Church of St John More images	Q26304980
Robert Aston Tomb about 10 Metres South of South West Corner of Church of St John	II*	Church Lane			1 March 1990	SP2528212389; 51°48′34″N 1°38′05″W		1284083	Robert Aston Tomb about 10 Metres South of South West Corner of Church of St John More images	Q17533005
School House (burford Grammar School)	II	Church Lane			12 September 1955	SP2522512331; 51°48′33″N 1°38′08″W		1267158	Upload Photo	Q26557576
Smallbones Memorial about 21 Metres South of Priests Door of Church of St John	II	Church Lane			1 March 1990	SP2532212374; 51°48′34″N 1°38′03″W		1053259	Upload Photo	Q26304986
The Great Almshouses	II*	Church Lane			12 September 1955	SP2529212345; 51°48′33″N 1°38′04″W		1053285	The Great Almshouses More images	Q17531559
Thomas Buckland Memorial Near South West Corner of St Johns Churchyard	II	Church Lane			1 March 1990	SP2527412392; 51°48′35″N 1°38′05″W		1053253	Upload Photo	Q26304979
Waller Memorial about 17 Metres South of Entrance to Guild Chapel of Church of St John	II	Church Lane			1 March 1990	SP2528812381; 51°48′34″N 1°38′05″W		1053293	Upload Photo	Q26305018
Part of Burford Grammar School	II	2, Church Lane			12 September 1955	SP2521612336; 51°48′33″N 1°38′08″W		1223721	Upload Photo	Q26517974
Rose Cottage	II	Guildenford			11 March 1976	SP2531412298; 51°48′32″N 1°38′03″W		1223722	Upload Photo	Q26517975
1 and 2, Guildenford	II	1 and 2, Guildenford			11 March 1976	SP2528012189; 51°48′28″N 1°38′05″W		1223723	Upload Photo	Q26517976
5 and 8, Guildenford	II	5 and 8, Guildenford			12 September 1955	SP2530012229; 51°48′29″N 1°38′04″W		1267133	Upload Photo	Q26557556
Castle's Almshouses	II	5 and 6, Guildenford			12 September 1955	SP2532812216; 51°48′29″N 1°38′03″W		1267150	Upload Photo	Q26557571
Apple Store, Coach House, Stables And Flanking Garden Walls About 50 Metres East Of Riverside House Churchyard West Boundary Wall	II	High Street			1 March 1990	SP2527812434; 51°48′36″N 1°38′05″W		1267152	Upload Photo	Q26557572
Bridge over River Windrush	II*	High Street, River Windrush			12 September 1955	SP2517912504; 51°48′38″N 1°38′10″W		1267151	Upload Photo	Q17532796
Burford Grammar School Buildings on South West Corner of Lawrence Lane	II	High Street			12 September 1955	SP2520312398; 51°48′35″N 1°38′09″W		1223726	Burford Grammar School Buildings on South West Corner of Lawrence Lane More images	Q26517978
Burford Grammar School Gymnasium	II	High Street			12 September 1955	SP2519312332; 51°48′33″N 1°38′10″W		1223866	Upload Photo	Q26518105
Chapel House	II	High Street			12 September 1955	SP2517112231; 51°48′29″N 1°38′11″W		1267101	Chapel House More images	Q26557527
Coach House and Attached Gatepiers and Wall Linking with Entrance to the Old Vicarage	II	High Street			11 March 1976	SP2517612403; 51°48′35″N 1°38′10″W		1266918	Coach House and Attached Gatepiers and Wall Linking with Entrance to the Old Vicarage More images	Q26557370
Cob House	II*	High Street			12 September 1955	SP2518112420; 51°48′35″N 1°38′10″W		1224292	Cob House More images	Q17532460
Corner House Hotel	II	High Street			12 September 1955	SP2516312181; 51°48′28″N 1°38′11″W		1223879	Corner House Hotel More images	Q26518116
Entrance to the Old Vicarage	II	High Street			1 March 1990	SP2518212414; 51°48′35″N 1°38′10″W		1224237	Entrance to the Old Vicarage More images	Q26518435
Falkland Hall	II*	High Street			12 September 1955	SP2515912328; 51°48′32″N 1°38′11″W		1224323	Falkland Hall More images	Q17532472
Former Mill Close about 5 Metres to South of Island House	II	High Street			1 March 1990	SP2513412466; 51°48′37″N 1°38′13″W		1224233	Upload Photo	Q26518431
Former Wool Loft/barn Adjoining Number 115 to South East	II	High Street			12 September 1955	SP2516812101; 51°48′25″N 1°38′11″W		1267017	Upload Photo	Q26557460
Gatepiers of Entrance to Riverside House and Flanking Walls	II	High Street			1 March 1990	SP2520512460; 51°48′37″N 1°38′09″W		1223800	Upload Photo	Q26518045
Gazebo about 30 Metres South East of Number 115	II	High Street			12 September 1955	SP2519912068; 51°48′24″N 1°38′09″W		1266975	Upload Photo	Q26557420
House Adjoining Riverside House to South	II	High Street			12 September 1955	SP2520612433; 51°48′36″N 1°38′09″W		1267117	House Adjoining Riverside House to South More images	Q26557542
Island House	II	High Street			12 September 1955	SP2514012481; 51°48′37″N 1°38′12″W		1266915	Upload Photo	Q26557367
Methodist Church	II*	High Street			12 September 1955	SP2518012242; 51°48′30″N 1°38′10″W		1223964	Methodist Church More images	Q4998483
Forecourt Walls, Railings, Gates And Alleyway Gateway Of Methodist Church	II*	High Street			12 September 1955	SP2516912244; 51°48′30″N 1°38′11″W		1223874	Forecourt Walls, Railings, Gates And Alleyway Gateway Of Methodist Church More images	Q17532342
Outbuilding about 15 Metres South East of Island House	II	High Street			1 March 1990	SP2515212471; 51°48′37″N 1°38′12″W		1266916	Upload Photo	Q26557368
Outbuilding about 20 Metres South East of Island House	II	High Street			11 March 1976	SP2516512466; 51°48′37″N 1°38′11″W		1224234	Upload Photo	Q26518432
Outbuilding Adjoining Cob House to North; Also Archway and Wall to North	II	High Street			1 March 1990	SP2518212433; 51°48′36″N 1°38′10″W		1224235	Upload Photo	Q26518433
Oxford and Swindon Cooperative (northern Part)	II	High Street			11 March 1976	SP2511012104; 51°48′25″N 1°38′14″W		1224564	Oxford and Swindon Cooperative (northern Part) More images	Q26518736
Oxford And Swindon Cooperative (Southern Part)	II	High Street			1 March 1990	SP2510712098; 51°48′25″N 1°38′14″W		1266699	Oxford And Swindon Cooperative (Southern Part) More images	Q26557169
Riverside House	II*	High Street			12 September 1955	SP2521612445; 51°48′36″N 1°38′08″W		1223724	Riverside House More images	Q17532317
Sheepscote And Rest Cottages To Rear The Golden Pheasant Hotel	II	High Street			12 September 1955	SP2518812208; 51°48′29″N 1°38′10″W		1267035	Upload Photo	Q26557477
The Bull Hotel	II*	High Street			12 September 1955	SP2517212149; 51°48′27″N 1°38′11″W		1223880	The Bull Hotel More images	Q17532353
The Burford Gallery And Classical House	II	High Street			12 September 1955	SP2518712251; 51°48′30″N 1°38′10″W		1223873	Upload Photo	Q26518111
The Cotswold Arms Inn	II	High Street			12 September 1955	SP2515812305; 51°48′32″N 1°38′11″W		1224324	The Cotswold Arms Inn More images	Q26518516
The Former George Inn	II*	High Street			12 September 1955	SP2513012173; 51°48′27″N 1°38′13″W		1224560	The Former George Inn More images	Q17532493
The Old Vicarage	II	High Street			12 September 1955	SP2517012423; 51°48′36″N 1°38′11″W		1266917	Upload Photo	Q26557369
The Tolsey	II*	High Street			12 September 1955	SP2511712134; 51°48′26″N 1°38′14″W		1224632	The Tolsey More images	Q17532521
The White Horse Inn	II	High Street			12 September 1955	SP2512512009; 51°48′22″N 1°38′13″W		1267021	The White Horse Inn More images	Q26557463
Old George Yard	II	1-3, High Street			12 September 1955	SP2510812176; 51°48′28″N 1°38′14″W		1266761	Upload Photo	Q26682673
Symon Wysdom's House	II*	1, High Street			12 September 1955	SP2520612470; 51°48′37″N 1°38′09″W		1223797	Symon Wysdom's House More images	Q17532328
Old George Yard	II	4, 6, 7 and 8, High Street			12 September 1955	SP2508912186; 51°48′28″N 1°38′15″W		1224561	Upload Photo	Q26518734
Old George Yard	II*	9-11, High Street			12 September 1955	SP2511412185; 51°48′28″N 1°38′14″W		1224562	Upload Photo	Q17532503
15 and 17, High Street	II	15 and 17, High Street			12 September 1955	SP2520412424; 51°48′36″N 1°38′09″W		1223725	15 and 17, High Street More images	Q26517977
Richard's Cottage and Attached Stable at North End	II	18, High Street			12 September 1955	SP2517112391; 51°48′35″N 1°38′11″W		1224238	Richard's Cottage and Attached Stable at North End More images	Q26518436
20, High Street	II	20, High Street			12 September 1955	SP2516912378; 51°48′34″N 1°38′11″W		1266919	20, High Street More images	Q26557371
22, High Street	II	22, High Street			12 September 1955	SP2516612373; 51°48′34″N 1°38′11″W		1266872	22, High Street More images	Q26557330
23, High Street	II	23, High Street			12 September 1955	SP2519612377; 51°48′34″N 1°38′09″W		1223727	23, High Street More images	Q26517979
The Forge	II	24, High Street			12 September 1955	SP2516412367; 51°48′34″N 1°38′11″W		1224239	Upload Photo	Q26518437
Warwick House	II	25, High Street			12 September 1955	SP2519612372; 51°48′34″N 1°38′09″W		1223728	Warwick House More images	Q26517980
Providence Cottage	II	26, High Street			12 September 1955	SP2516312360; 51°48′34″N 1°38′11″W		1224240	Upload Photo	Q26518438
Window Box Cottage	II	27, High Street			12 September 1955	SP2519612364; 51°48′34″N 1°38′09″W		1223857	Window Box Cottage More images	Q26518098
Forest's Outfitters Garage Cottage The Garage	II	28, High Street			12 September 1955	SP2516112349; 51°48′33″N 1°38′11″W		1224241	Forest's Outfitters Garage Cottage The Garage More images	Q26518439
Bygones	II	29, High Street			12 September 1955	SP2519312360; 51°48′34″N 1°38′10″W		1223729	Bygones More images	Q26517981
The Burford Woodroom	II	31, High Street			12 September 1955	SP2519212350; 51°48′33″N 1°38′10″W		1223730	The Burford Woodroom More images	Q26517982
Bear Court	II	34, 36, 38, 38a, 42, High Street			12 September 1955	SP2515012343; 51°48′33″N 1°38′12″W		1224322	Upload Photo	Q26518515
Anne Marie's Hair Stylist Priory Tea Rooms	II	39, High Street			12 September 1955	SP2518812312; 51°48′32″N 1°38′10″W		1267095	Upload Photo	Q26557521
The Maggie White Shop	II	41, 43 and 45, High Street			12 September 1955	SP2518512302; 51°48′32″N 1°38′10″W		1267096	Upload Photo	Q26557522
Providence House	II	47, High Street			11 March 1976	SP2518312296; 51°48′31″N 1°38′10″W		1223868	Providence House More images	Q26518106
Caroline Jane	II	48, High Street			12 September 1955	SP2515612299; 51°48′32″N 1°38′12″W		1224325	Caroline Jane More images	Q26518517
Jonathan Fyson Antiques	II	50, High Street			12 September 1955	SP2515412293; 51°48′31″N 1°38′12″W		1266881	Jonathan Fyson Antiques More images	Q26557338
Clement House	II	51, High Street			11 March 1976	SP2518112288; 51°48′31″N 1°38′10″W		1223869	Clement House More images	Q26518107
Rj Barnard	II	52, High Street			12 September 1955	SP2515312286; 51°48′31″N 1°38′12″W		1266882	Upload Photo	Q26557339
Cotswold Bookshop and Windrush Valley Cleaners	II	53, 55, 57 and 59, High Street			12 September 1955	SP2518012279; 51°48′31″N 1°38′10″W		1267098	Cotswold Bookshop and Windrush Valley Cleaners More images	Q26557524
Lollipop	II	54, High Street			12 September 1955	SP2515212282; 51°48′31″N 1°38′12″W		1224375	Lollipop More images	Q26518563
Muriel Beach Thomas	II	56, High Street			12 September 1955	SP2515212277; 51°48′31″N 1°38′12″W		1224328	Muriel Beach Thomas More images	Q26518520
College Yard	II	58, 60 and 62, High Street			12 September 1955	SP2513212283; 51°48′31″N 1°38′13″W		1266883	Upload Photo	Q26557340
Peter Norden Antiques	II	61, High Street			12 September 1955	SP2517912271; 51°48′31″N 1°38′10″W		1267099	Peter Norden Antiques More images	Q26557525
Belinda	II	63, High Street			12 September 1955	SP2517812265; 51°48′30″N 1°38′10″W		1223931	Belinda More images	Q26518163
64, High Street	II	64, High Street			12 September 1955	SP2515012270; 51°48′31″N 1°38′12″W		1224423	64, High Street More images	Q26518606
Shoo Cottage	II	65, High Street			12 September 1955	SP2517712260; 51°48′30″N 1°38′10″W		1267051	Shoo Cottage More images	Q26557490
Frank Williams Antiques	II	66, High Street			12 September 1955	SP2514612254; 51°48′30″N 1°38′12″W		1224329	Upload Photo	Q26518521
Jackie's Tea Rooms The Antiquary	II*	68 and 70, High Street			12 September 1955	SP2514712262; 51°48′30″N 1°38′12″W		1266884	Jackie's Tea Rooms The Antiquary More images	Q17532759
Hussey And Sons Partridges	II	74, High Street			12 September 1955	SP2512512249; 51°48′30″N 1°38′13″W		1224473	Hussey And Sons Partridges More images	Q26518653
The Mermaid Inn and Attached Mounting Block	II	78, High Street			12 September 1955	SP2513912236; 51°48′30″N 1°38′12″W		1224330	The Mermaid Inn and Attached Mounting Block More images	Q26518522
Anthony Nielsen Antiques	II	80, High Street			12 September 1955	SP2513812227; 51°48′29″N 1°38′12″W		1224482	Upload Photo	Q26518662
Burford Branch Library And Adjoining House	II	82, High Street			12 September 1955	SP2513712216; 51°48′29″N 1°38′13″W		1266802	Burford Branch Library And Adjoining House More images	Q26557262
Burford Post Office Meath Cottage Tor Cottage	II	83, High Street			12 September 1955	SP2517812221; 51°48′29″N 1°38′10″W		1223875	Burford Post Office Meath Cottage Tor Cottage More images	Q26518112
Brian Sinfield	II	92, High Street			12 September 1955	SP2513712209; 51°48′29″N 1°38′13″W		1224331	Brian Sinfield More images	Q26518523
The Stone Gallery	II	93, High Street			12 September 1955	SP2516512206; 51°48′29″N 1°38′11″W		1223877	The Stone Gallery More images	Q26518114
Aubrey Newman	II*	94, High Street			12 September 1955	SP2513512203; 51°48′28″N 1°38′13″W		1266772	Aubrey Newman More images	Q17532748
Hampton and Sons	II*	96, High Street			12 September 1955	SP2513512194; 51°48′28″N 1°38′13″W		1224332	Upload Photo	Q17532483
Horseshoe Antiques	II	97, High Street			12 September 1955	SP2516112192; 51°48′28″N 1°38′11″W		1267038	Horseshoe Antiques More images	Q26557479
Huffkins Premises Adjoining Rose And Crown On The South	II	98, High Street			12 September 1955	SP2513312187; 51°48′28″N 1°38′13″W		1224530	Huffkins Premises Adjoining Rose And Crown On The South More images	Q26518705
Walkers Zene Walker	II	101, High Street			12 September 1955	SP2516012164; 51°48′27″N 1°38′11″W		1224029	Walkers Zene Walker More images	Q26518249
Burford News	II	107, High Street			12 September 1955	SP2516512141; 51°48′26″N 1°38′11″W		1267016	Burford News More images	Q26557459
London House The Crypt Antiques	II*	109, High Street			12 September 1955	SP2515312140; 51°48′26″N 1°38′12″W		1224036	London House The Crypt Antiques More images	Q17532373
Oxford Knitwear Wj Castle (Butchers)	II*	113, High Street			12 September 1955	SP2515112130; 51°48′26″N 1°38′12″W		1224037	Oxford Knitwear Wj Castle (Butchers) More images	Q17532385
Red Lion House	II*	114, 116, 118, 120 and 122, High Street			12 September 1955	SP2512712161; 51°48′27″N 1°38′13″W		1266762	Red Lion House More images	Q17532737
115, High Street	II*	115, High Street			12 September 1955	SP2514712119; 51°48′26″N 1°38′12″W		1224106	115, High Street More images	Q17532417
The Highway Hotel	II*	117, High Street			12 September 1955	SP2514712106; 51°48′25″N 1°38′12″W		1224038	The Highway Hotel More images	Q17532402
Wysdomes	II*	121, High Street			12 September 1955	SP2514112097; 51°48′25″N 1°38′12″W		1267018	Wysdomes More images	Q17532774
The House of Simon	II*	123, High Street			12 September 1955	SP2513912092; 51°48′25″N 1°38′12″W		1224146	The House of Simon More images	Q17532429
124, High Street	II*	124, High Street, OX18 4QR			12 September 1955	SP2512412155; 51°48′27″N 1°38′13″W		1224598	124, High Street More images	Q17532512
Burford Garage	II	125, High Street			12 September 1955	SP2513812085; 51°48′25″N 1°38′13″W		1267019	Burford Garage More images	Q26557461
Chevrons	II	High Street			12 September 1955	SP2513912076; 51°48′24″N 1°38′12″W		1224039	Chevrons More images	Q26518256
Swan Gallery	II	127, High Street			12 September 1955	SP2514712060; 51°48′24″N 1°38′12″W		1224150	Swan Gallery More images	Q26518353
Hyde Cottage	II	129, High Street			12 September 1955	SP2513212058; 51°48′24″N 1°38′13″W		1267020	Hyde Cottage More images	Q26557462
Englefield	II	131, High Street			12 September 1955	SP2513112052; 51°48′24″N 1°38′13″W		1224163	Englefield More images	Q26518366
Rose Dodd St Albans	II	132, High Street			12 September 1955	SP2511512123; 51°48′26″N 1°38′14″W		1266763	Rose Dodd St Albans More images	Q26557227
Dolphin Cottage	II	133, High Street			12 September 1955	SP2512712044; 51°48′23″N 1°38′13″W		1224040	Dolphin Cottage More images	Q26518257
R Taylor	II	134, High Street			11 March 1976	SP2511112111; 51°48′25″N 1°38′14″W		1266726	R Taylor More images	Q26557194
Graziers Lime Tree Cottage	II	137, High Street			12 September 1955	SP2512912036; 51°48′23″N 1°38′13″W		1224172	Graziers Lime Tree Cottage More images	Q26518375
Hill House	II*	139, High Street			12 September 1955	SP2512512027; 51°48′23″N 1°38′13″W		1224184	Hill House More images	Q17532447
Plumtree Cottage	II	143, High Street			12 September 1955	SP2511712003; 51°48′22″N 1°38′14″W		1224216	Plumtree Cottage More images	Q26518415
Burford Woodcraft	II	144 and 146, High Street			12 September 1955	SP2510512091; 51°48′25″N 1°38′14″W		1224565	Burford Woodcraft More images	Q26518737
Old Beams	II	145, High Street			12 September 1955	SP2511611996; 51°48′22″N 1°38′14″W		1224041	Old Beams More images	Q26518258
Crown Cottage	II	147, High Street			12 September 1955	SP2511611988; 51°48′21″N 1°38′14″W		1224230	Crown Cottage More images	Q26518428
148 and 150, High Street	II	148 and 150, High Street			12 September 1955	SP2510312084; 51°48′25″N 1°38′14″W		1224566	148 and 150, High Street More images	Q26518738
Ridgeway	II	151, High Street			12 September 1955	SP2511211970; 51°48′21″N 1°38′14″W		1224231	Ridgeway More images	Q26518429
West View House	II	151, High Street			12 September 1955	SP2511211980; 51°48′21″N 1°38′14″W		1266913	West View House More images	Q26557365
152, High Street	II	152, High Street, OX18 4QY			12 September 1955	SP2509912076; 51°48′24″N 1°38′15″W		1224692	152, High Street More images	Q26518852
Hillsleigh	II	154, High Street			12 September 1955	SP2509712067; 51°48′24″N 1°38′15″W		1224567	Hillsleigh More images	Q26518739
Chippings	II	155, High Street			12 September 1955	SP2510711959; 51°48′21″N 1°38′14″W		1266914	Chippings More images	Q26557366
Walrus House	II	156, High Street			12 September 1955	SP2509512062; 51°48′24″N 1°38′15″W		1224704	Upload Photo	Q26518864
Pytt's Piece	II	157, High Street			12 September 1955	SP2510711948; 51°48′20″N 1°38′14″W		1224232	Pytt's Piece More images	Q26518430
Mary Phillips	II	158, High Street			12 September 1955	SP2509312056; 51°48′24″N 1°38′15″W		1224568	Upload Photo	Q26518740
St Winnow	II	160, High Street			12 September 1955	SP2509112050; 51°48′24″N 1°38′15″W		1224717	St Winnow More images	Q26518876
The Gabled House	II	162, High Street			12 September 1955	SP2508712043; 51°48′23″N 1°38′15″W		1224569	The Gabled House More images	Q26518741
The Old Court and Railings in Front	II	164, High Street			1 March 1990	SP2508612034; 51°48′23″N 1°38′15″W		1224739	Upload Photo	Q26518898
Hill Cottage Rose Cottage	II	168, High Street			12 September 1955	SP2508312020; 51°48′23″N 1°38′15″W		1224747	Upload Photo	Q26518905
Long Wivets	II	170, High Street			12 September 1955	SP2508112012; 51°48′22″N 1°38′16″W		1224748	Long Wivets More images	Q26518906
Midhill House	II	172, High Street			12 September 1955	SP2507912005; 51°48′22″N 1°38′16″W		1266656	Midhill House More images	Q26557129
Glenthorne House	II	174, High Street			12 September 1955	SP2507611996; 51°48′22″N 1°38′16″W		1266657	Glenthorne House More images	Q26557130
The Little House	II	178, High Street			12 September 1955	SP2507611982; 51°48′21″N 1°38′16″W		1224750	The Little House More images	Q26518908
The Limes	II	180, High Street			12 September 1955	SP2507411975; 51°48′21″N 1°38′16″W		1224751	The Limes More images	Q26518909
Donnington House	II	182, High Street			12 September 1955	SP2507211966; 51°48′21″N 1°38′16″W		1266648	Donnington House More images	Q26557121
Danum Cottage Limehurst	II	186, High Street			12 September 1955	SP2507111958; 51°48′21″N 1°38′16″W		1224752	Danum Cottage Limehurst More images	Q26518910
Clematis Cottage Hound Cottage The Cottage	II	192, High Street			12 September 1955	SP2506911947; 51°48′20″N 1°38′16″W		1266612	Clematis Cottage Hound Cottage The Cottage More images	Q26557088
East View	II	194, High Street			12 September 1955	SP2506711934; 51°48′20″N 1°38′16″W		1224753	East View More images	Q26518911
Hill Crest	II	196, High Street			12 September 1955	SP2506611924; 51°48′19″N 1°38′16″W		1224754	Hill Crest More images	Q26518912
Price's Almshouse	II	202, 204 and 206, High Street			1 March 1990	SP2506111834; 51°48′17″N 1°38′17″W		1225058	Upload Photo	Q26519184
1 and 2, Lawrence Lane	II	2, Lawrence Lane			12 September 1955	SP2521312418; 51°48′35″N 1°38′09″W		1266660	1 and 2, Lawrence Lane More images	Q26557133
3 and 4, Lawrence Lane	II	3 and 4, Lawrence Lane			11 March 1976	SP2522512416; 51°48′35″N 1°38′08″W		1225085	3 and 4, Lawrence Lane More images	Q26519209
Staytes Farm Cottage	II	Lower Upton, Upton			12 September 1955	SP2432112512; 51°48′39″N 1°38′55″W		1225447	Upload Photo	Q26519543
Staytes Farmhouse	II	Lower Upton, Upton			1 March 1990	SP2435012526; 51°48′39″N 1°38′54″W		1225489	Upload Photo	Q26519581
1, Lower Upton Cottages	II	1, Lower Upton Cottages, Upton			12 September 1955	SP2429912506; 51°48′38″N 1°38′56″W		1266332	Upload Photo	Q26682616
2, Lower Upton Cottages	II	2, Lower Upton Cottages, Upton			12 September 1955	SP2429412522; 51°48′39″N 1°38′56″W		1225448	Upload Photo	Q26519544
Burford Primary School Together With Forecourt Wall And Railings	II	Priory Lane			1 March 1990	SP2510412346; 51°48′33″N 1°38′14″W		1224756	Upload Photo	Q26518914
Chapel of St John	II*	Priory Lane			12 September 1955	SP2499612334; 51°48′33″N 1°38′20″W		1266497	Chapel of St John More images	Q17532725
Detached Wall Fragment in Line about 30 Metres West of the Priory	II	Priory Lane			1 March 1990	SP2492912363; 51°48′34″N 1°38′23″W		1266458	Upload Photo	Q26556948
Garden Boundary Walls of the Priory	II	Priory Lane			1 March 1990	SP2497912296; 51°48′31″N 1°38′21″W		1225270	Upload Photo	Q26519382
Link between the Priory and Lenthall's Chapel	II*	Priory Lane			12 September 1955	SP2500012345; 51°48′33″N 1°38′20″W		1225187	Upload Photo	Q17532553
Old Rectory Cottage	II	Priory Lane			12 September 1955	SP2508512390; 51°48′35″N 1°38′15″W		1266506	Upload Photo	Q26556994
Ornamental Wall at South West End of the Priory	II	Priory Lane			1 March 1990	SP2494412351; 51°48′33″N 1°38′23″W		1225434	Upload Photo	Q26519531
Portland Priory Close The Glen	II	Priory Lane			12 September 1955	SP2506912315; 51°48′32″N 1°38′16″W		1225190	Upload Photo	Q26519306
The Actons	II	Priory Lane			12 September 1955	SP2508312315; 51°48′32″N 1°38′15″W		1225189	Upload Photo	Q26519305
The Old Rectory	II*	Priory Lane			12 September 1955	SP2507912369; 51°48′34″N 1°38′16″W		1224757	Upload Photo	Q17532546
The Priory	I	Priory Lane			12 September 1955	SP2499612363; 51°48′34″N 1°38′20″W		1224759	The Priory More images	Q4998485
The Yews and Adjoining Garage Range	II	Priory Lane			11 March 1976	SP2512012311; 51°48′32″N 1°38′13″W		1225188	Upload Photo	Q26519304
1 and 2, Priory Lane	II	1 and 2, Priory Lane			12 September 1955	SP2514912326; 51°48′32″N 1°38′12″W		1224755	1 and 2, Priory Lane More images	Q26518913
3-6, Priory Lane	II	3-6, Priory Lane			11 March 1976	SP2514112327; 51°48′32″N 1°38′12″W		1225105	Upload Photo	Q26519227
Sydney Cottage and the Lodge	II	Pytts Lane, OX18 4SJ			12 September 1955	SP2525512082; 51°48′25″N 1°38′06″W		1225191	Upload Photo	Q26519307
Leather Alley Cottage, Right Hand Part	II	Right Hand Part, Witney Street			2 September 1955	SP2535512135; 51°48′26″N 1°38′01″W		1266296	Upload Photo	Q26556798
Barraca	II	Sheep Street			12 September 1955	SP2500012215; 51°48′29″N 1°38′20″W		1266454	Upload Photo	Q26556944
Bay Tree Hotel	II	Sheep Street			12 September 1955	SP2501912205; 51°48′29″N 1°38′19″W		1225264	Bay Tree Hotel More images	Q26519376
Bay Tree Hotel Annexe and Cross Wing to Rear Courtyard	II	Sheep Street			12 September 1955	SP2503212197; 51°48′28″N 1°38′18″W		1225193	Upload Photo	Q26519309
Boundary Wall and Gate Piers to the Priory and the Old Rectory	II	Sheep Street			1 March 1990	SP2506512345; 51°48′33″N 1°38′16″W		1225401	Upload Photo	Q26519502
Brewery and Malthouse to Rear	II	Sheep Street			12 September 1955	SP2499612242; 51°48′30″N 1°38′20″W		1225265	Upload Photo	Q26519377
Calendars	II*	Sheep Street			12 September 1955	SP2503312160; 51°48′27″N 1°38′18″W		1266408	Upload Photo	Q17532715
Clivers Close	II	Sheep Street			12 September 1955	SP2498912188; 51°48′28″N 1°38′20″W		1225269	Upload Photo	Q26519381
Cottage to East of Calendars	II	Sheep Street			12 September 1955	SP2503912162; 51°48′27″N 1°38′18″W		1225267	Upload Photo	Q26519379
Eastern Extension to the Lamb Hotel	II	Sheep Street			12 September 1955	SP2497612229; 51°48′29″N 1°38′21″W		1225304	Upload Photo	Q26519409
Greenbanks Cottage	II	Sheep Street			12 September 1955	SP2497912192; 51°48′28″N 1°38′21″W		1266457	Upload Photo	Q26556947
Hanover House	II	Sheep Street			12 September 1955	SP2506512150; 51°48′27″N 1°38′16″W		1266437	Upload Photo	Q26556928
Lenthall Cottage	II	Sheep Street			12 September 1955	SP2505612153; 51°48′27″N 1°38′17″W		1225328	Upload Photo	Q26519431
Lloyds Bank	II	Sheep Street			1 March 1990	SP2506512180; 51°48′28″N 1°38′16″W		1225249	Upload Photo	Q26519361
Masonic Lodge to Rear of Wychwood Lodge Cottage	II	Sheep Street			12 September 1955	SP2500012158; 51°48′27″N 1°38′20″W		1225377	Upload Photo	Q26519479
Redesdale	II	Sheep Street			12 September 1955	SP2497312195; 51°48′28″N 1°38′21″W		1225444	Upload Photo	Q26519540
Roche House And The Chestnuts	II	Sheep Street			12 September 1955	SP2501412173; 51°48′28″N 1°38′19″W		1225268	Upload Photo	Q26519380
The Lamb Hotel and Attached Mounting Block	II	Sheep Street			12 September 1955	SP2495712238; 51°48′30″N 1°38′22″W		1266455	Upload Photo	Q26556945
The Malthouse	II	Sheep Street			12 September 1955	SP2498212225; 51°48′29″N 1°38′21″W		1225266	Upload Photo	Q26519378
Titcombs Including Wall and Archway Linking with Lloyds Bank	II	Sheep Street			12 September 1955	SP2504012192; 51°48′28″N 1°38′18″W		1225192	Upload Photo	Q26519308
Waynes Close	II	Sheep Street			12 September 1955	SP2501912167; 51°48′27″N 1°38′19″W		1266456	Upload Photo	Q26556946
Wychwood Lodge Cottage And Wychcot	II	Sheep Street			12 September 1955	SP2500512181; 51°48′28″N 1°38′19″W		1225335	Upload Photo	Q26519437
Signet Farm South	II	Signet, OX18 4JQ			1 March 1990	SP2471010156; 51°47′22″N 1°38′35″W		1266324	Upload Photo	Q26556822
The Cottage	II	Swan Lane			1 March 1990	SP2522612030; 51°48′23″N 1°38′08″W		1266348	Upload Photo	Q26556844
Bridge Approximately 125 Metres East South East Of Ladyham (Fulbrook Civil Parish),That Part In Burford And Upton And Signet	II				12 September 1955	SP2539312495; 51°48′38″N 1°37′59″W		1053282	Upload Photo	Q26305008
Barn about 30 Metres South of Lower Upton Farmhouse	II	Upton			12 September 1955	SP2412412561; 51°48′40″N 1°39′05″W		1225543	Upload Photo	Q26519629
Garden Wall about 7 Metres North of Lower Upton Farmhouse	II	Upton			1 March 1990	SP2414012635; 51°48′43″N 1°39′04″W		1225533	Upload Photo	Q26519620
Kitt's Quarry House and Barn to South	II	Upton			12 September 1955	SP2417212306; 51°48′32″N 1°39′03″W		1225445	Upload Photo	Q26519541
Lower Upton Farmhouse	II	Upton			12 September 1955	SP2414012621; 51°48′42″N 1°39′04″W		1225449	Upload Photo	Q26519545
Outbuilding about 14 Metres West of Kitt's Quarry House	II	Upton			1 March 1990	SP2415012310; 51°48′32″N 1°39′04″W		1075790	Upload Photo	Q26339616
Rose and Crown Cottage	II	Upton			12 September 1955	SP2418112408; 51°48′35″N 1°39′02″W		1225446	Upload Photo	Q26519542
Large Barn to East of Whitehall Farmhouse (not Included)	II	Widford Road			1 March 1990	SP2673611284; 51°47′58″N 1°36′49″W		1225452	Upload Photo	Q26519547
Addison Cottage	II	Witney Street			12 September 1955	SP2530912156; 51°48′27″N 1°38′04″W		1225585	Upload Photo	Q26519669
Bridge Over River Windrush	II*	Witney Street			12 September 1955	SP2517912504; 51°48′38″N 1°38′10″W		1267151	Bridge Over River Windrush More images	Q17532796
Bull Cottage	II*	Witney Street			12 September 1955	SP2520912158; 51°48′27″N 1°38′09″W		1225698	Upload Photo	Q17532565
Burford Bakery York Cottage	II	Witney Street			12 September 1955	SP2520712182; 51°48′28″N 1°38′09″W		1266320	Upload Photo	Q26556818
Burford Baptist Church	II	Witney Street			12 September 1955	SP2533812122; 51°48′26″N 1°38′02″W		1266238	Upload Photo	Q26556746
Byways	II	Witney Street			12 September 1955	SP2528512165; 51°48′27″N 1°38′05″W		1225584	Upload Photo	Q26519668
Cartref	II	Witney Street			12 September 1955	SP2525712174; 51°48′27″N 1°38′06″W		1225572	Upload Photo	Q26519656
Cobwebs	II	Witney Street			12 September 1955	SP2531612153; 51°48′27″N 1°38′03″W		1266295	Upload Photo	Q26556797
Consitt House	II	Witney Street			12 September 1955	SP2525212156; 51°48′27″N 1°38′07″W		1225751	Upload Photo	Q26519817
Cottage to Rear of Walkers Wood Burning Stoves	II	Witney Street			1 March 1990	SP2519212166; 51°48′27″N 1°38′10″W		1266262	Upload Photo	Q26556767
Crossways	II	Witney Street			12 September 1955	SP2527112170; 51°48′27″N 1°38′06″W		1225454	Upload Photo	Q26519549
Gable Cottage	II	Witney Street			12 September 1955	SP2537012126; 51°48′26″N 1°38′00″W		1266231	Upload Photo	Q26556742
Garden Close	II	Witney Street			12 September 1955	SP2524512157; 51°48′27″N 1°38′07″W		1225700	Upload Photo	Q26519773
Hollyhock Cottage	II	Witney Street			12 September 1955	SP2537612123; 51°48′26″N 1°38′00″W		1225589	Upload Photo	Q26519673
House Adjoining and to East of Cobwebs	II	Witney Street			12 September 1955	SP2532312151; 51°48′27″N 1°38′03″W		1225650	Upload Photo	Q26519727
House Next But One on the West of Western Cottage	II	Witney Street			12 September 1955	SP2529512161; 51°48′27″N 1°38′04″W		1266294	Upload Photo	Q26556796
Keys	II	Witney Street			12 September 1955	SP2533112149; 51°48′27″N 1°38′02″W		1225586	Upload Photo	Q26519670
Leather Alley Cottage Left Hand Part	II	Witney Street			12 September 1955	SP2534912137; 51°48′26″N 1°38′01″W		1266226	Upload Photo	Q26556737
Mill Cottage	II	Witney Street			12 September 1955	SP2558812092; 51°48′25″N 1°37′49″W		1225697	Upload Photo	Q26519771
Mill House	II	Witney Street			12 September 1955	SP2551712059; 51°48′24″N 1°37′53″W		1266299	Upload Photo	Q26556801
Park House and Gatepiers Attached to West End	II	Witney Street			1 March 1990	SP2531712131; 51°48′26″N 1°38′03″W		1225701	Upload Photo	Q26519774
Plum Tree Cottage	II	Witney Street			12 September 1955	SP2523812159; 51°48′27″N 1°38′07″W		1225699	Upload Photo	Q26519772
Stables and Garage Adjoining and to South of Bull Cottage	II	Witney Street			1 March 1990	SP2520612150; 51°48′27″N 1°38′09″W		1225745	Upload Photo	Q26519812
Surviving Fragment of Foundry	II	Witney Street			12 September 1955	SP2534312136; 51°48′26″N 1°38′02″W		1225587	Upload Photo	Q26519671
Tannery Cottage And Chapman's Piece	II	Witney Street			1 March 1990	SP2543512095; 51°48′25″N 1°37′57″W		1266298	Upload Photo	Q26556800
Teribus and Porters Cottage	II	Witney Street			12 September 1955	SP2536312131; 51°48′26″N 1°38′01″W		1225588	Upload Photo	Q26519672
The Bield	II	Witney Street			11 March 1976	SP2524912177; 51°48′28″N 1°38′07″W		1225453	Upload Photo	Q26519548
The Fullers Cottage	II	Witney Street			12 September 1955	SP2526412172; 51°48′27″N 1°38′06″W		1266349	Upload Photo	Q26556845
The Great House	II*	Witney Street			12 September 1955	SP2528212145; 51°48′27″N 1°38′05″W		1266237	The Great House More images	Q17532702
The Mill Coach House and Attached Mounting Block	II	Witney Street			1 March 1990	SP2555912056; 51°48′24″N 1°37′51″W		1225592	Upload Photo	Q26519675
The Old Bell Foundry	II	Witney Street			12 September 1955	SP2533712145; 51°48′27″N 1°38′02″W		1266225	Upload Photo	Q26556736
The Old Saddlers	II	Witney Street			12 September 1955	SP2530112158; 51°48′27″N 1°38′04″W		1266247	Upload Photo	Q26556752
The Royal Oak Public House	II	Witney Street			12 September 1955	SP2526412153; 51°48′27″N 1°38′06″W		1225761	The Royal Oak Public House More images	Q26519828
Tudor Cottage	II	Witney Street			12 September 1955	SP2536612104; 51°48′25″N 1°38′01″W		1225777	Upload Photo	Q26519841
14, Witney Street	II	14, Witney Street, OX18 4SN			12 September 1955	SP2522212161; 51°48′27″N 1°38′08″W		1266236	14, Witney Street More images	Q26556745
Bridge Approximately 125 Metres East South East of Ladyham (that Part in Fulbrook Civil Parish)	II	A 361			12 September 1955	SP2539412496; 51°48′38″N 1°37′59″W		1283140	Upload Photo	Q26305008
Burford Quaker Meeting House With Attached Burial Ground Wall	II*				12 September 1955	SP2524112093; 51°48′25″N 1°38′07″W		1266442	Upload Photo	Q26556933
Bury Barn Inn with Attached Stables and Dovecote Wings	II	A40			1 March 1990	SP2503711632; 51°48′10″N 1°38′18″W		1367799	Bury Barn Inn with Attached Stables and Dovecote Wings More images	Q26649277
Coach Houses and Stable about 10 Metres South of Lower Upton Farmhouse	II				12 September 1955	SP2413112594; 51°48′41″N 1°39′05″W		1225451	Upload Photo	Q26519546
Cotswold Gateway Hotel	II	A40			1 March 1990	SP2506211725; 51°48′13″N 1°38′17″W		1053283	Upload Photo	Q26305009
House about 30 Metres to South East of Bury Barn Inn	II	A40			1 March 1990	SP2505311594; 51°48′09″N 1°38′17″W		1053284	Upload Photo	Q26305011
South West Boundary Wall To St Johns Churchyard And 2 Sets Of Gates,Gate Piers And Kissing Gates	II	Church Lane			1 March 1990	SP2527912385; 51°48′34″N 1°38′05″W		1053260	Upload Photo	Q26304987

== See also ==
- Grade I listed buildings in Oxfordshire
- Grade II* listed buildings in Oxfordshire

== Sources ==
- Brooks, Alan; Sherwood, Jennifer (2017), Oxfordshire: North and West, The Buildings of England, New Haven and London: Yale University Press, ISBN 978-0-300-20930-3
