= Magdalen College, Oxford =

College of the University of Oxford

Magdalen College
- University of Oxford
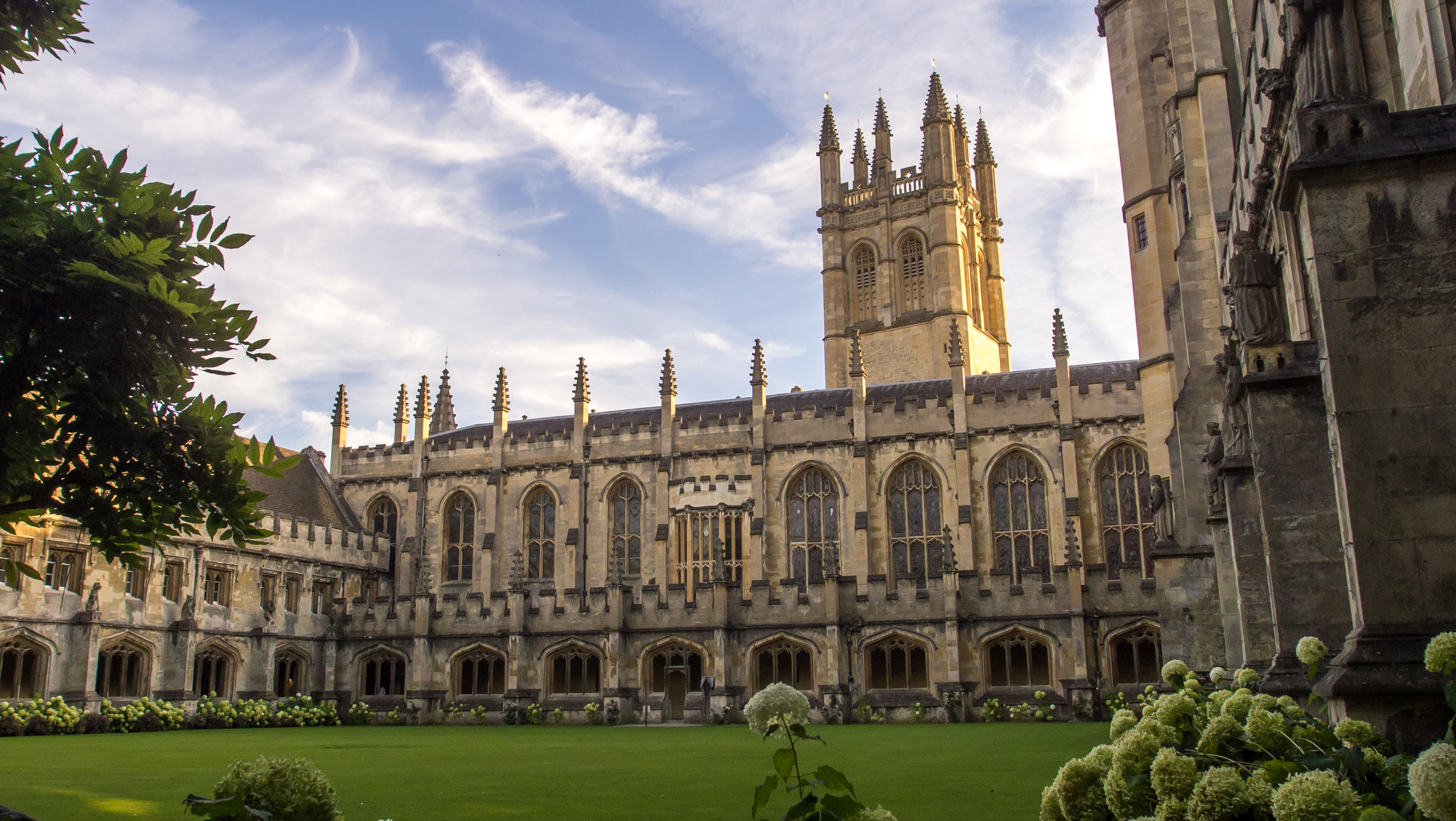
- The Cloister, hall, chapel, and Great Tower

- Arms: Lozengy ermine and sable, on a chief of the second three lilies argent slipped and seeded or
Scarf colours: black, with two equally-spaced wide bands of white
- Location: Longwall Street and High Street
- Coordinates: 51.752374°N 1.247077°W
- Full name: The College of St Mary Magdalen in the University of Oxford
- Latin name: Collegium Beatae Mariae Magdalenae
- Motto: Floreat Magdalena
- Established: 1458; 568 years ago
- Named for: Mary Magdalene
- Sister college: Magdalene College, Cambridge
- President: Dinah Rose
- Undergraduates: 390 (2018)
- Postgraduates: 178 (2018)
- Endowment: £817.9 million (2025)
- Website: www.magd.ox.ac.uk
- Boat club: Magdalen College Boat Club

Map
- Location within Oxford city centre

Magdalen College (/ˈmɔːdlɪn/ MAWD-lin) is a constituent college of the University of Oxford. It was founded in 1458 by Bishop of Winchester William of Waynflete. It is one of the wealthiest Oxford colleges, as of 2022, and one of the strongest academically, setting the record for the highest Norrington Score in 2010 and topping the table twice since then. It is home to several of the university's distinguished chairs, including the Agnelli-Serena Professorship, the Sherardian Professorship, and the four Waynflete Professorships.

The large, square Magdalen Tower is an Oxford landmark, and it is a tradition, dating to the days of Henry VII, that the College choir sings from the top of it at 6 a.m. on May Morning. The College stands next to the River Cherwell and the University of Oxford Botanic Garden. Within its grounds are a deer park and Addison's Walk.

== History ==
=== Foundation ===
Magdalen College was founded in 1458 by William Waynflete, Bishop of Winchester and Lord Chancellor of England and named after St Mary Magdalene. The College succeeded a university hall called Magdalen Hall, founded by Waynflete in 1448, and from which the College drew most of its earliest scholars. Magdalen Hall was suppressed when the College was founded. The name was revived for a second Magdalen Hall, established in the College's grounds around 1490, which in the 19th century was moved to Catte Street and became Hertford College. Waynflete also established a school, now Magdalen College School, a private school located nearby on the other side of the River Cherwell. Waynflete was assisted by a large bequest from Sir John Fastolf, who wished to fund a religious college.

Magdalen College took over the site of St John the Baptist Hospital, alongside the Cherwell, initially using the hospital's buildings until new construction was completed between 1470 and 1480. At incorporation in 1458, the College consisted of a president and six scholars. In 1487 when the Founder's Statutes were written, the foundation consisted of a President, 40 fellows, 30 demies, four chaplain priests, eight clerks, 16 choristers, and (appointed to the Grammar School), a master and an usher.

The founder's statutes included provision for a choral foundation of men and boys (a tradition that has continued to the present day) and made reference to the pronunciation of the name of the College in English. The College's name is pronounced like the adjective maudlin because the late medieval English name of Mary Magdalene was Maudelen, derived from the Old French Madelaine.

=== English Civil War ===
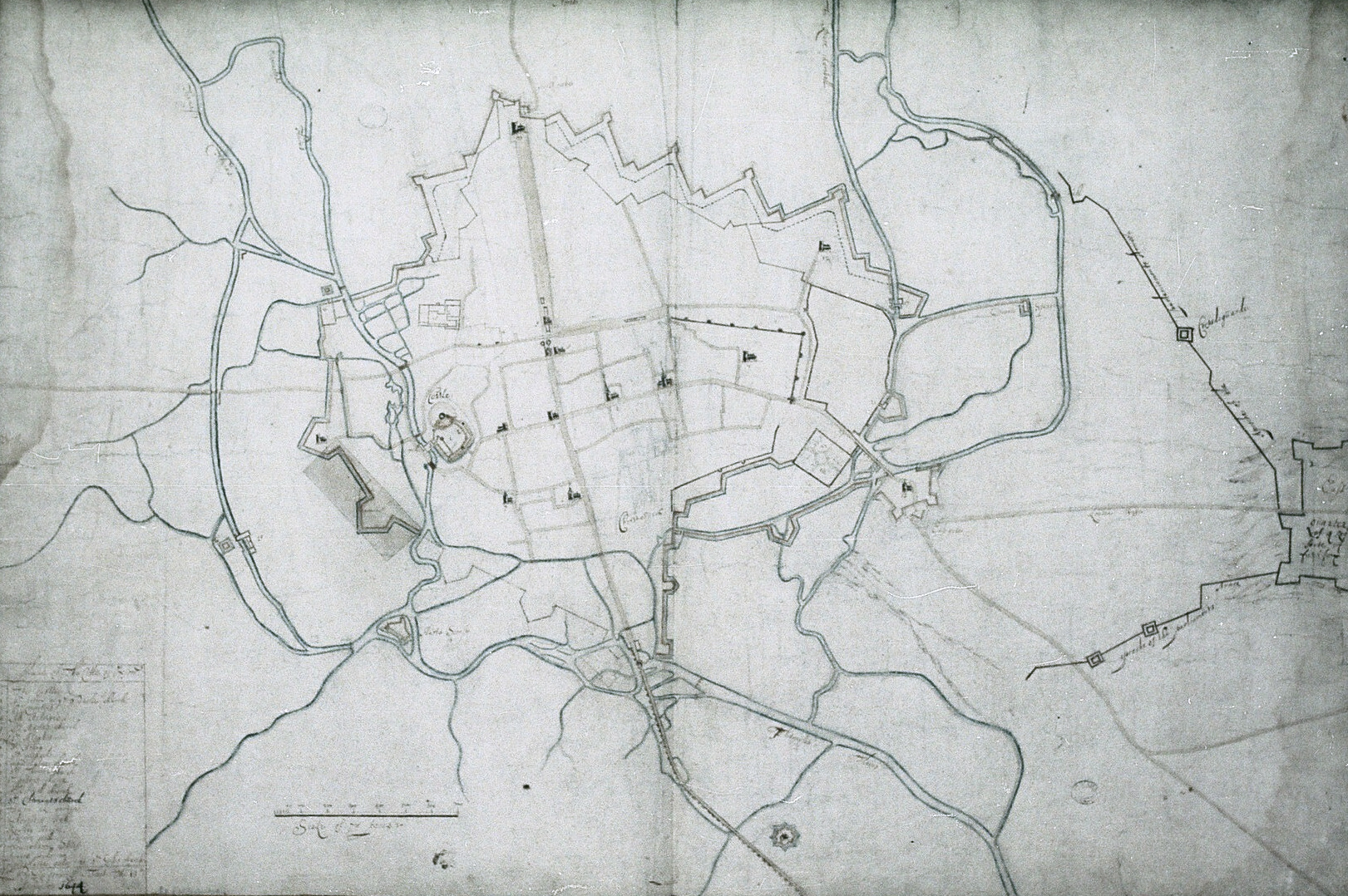
De Gomme's plan of Oxford's Civil War-era defences, 1644, shows Dover's Speare and other defences built around college grounds.

Oxford and Magdalen College were supporters of the Royalist cause during the English Civil War. In 1642, Magdalen College donated over 296 lbs of plate (ie. silver or gold utensils or dishes) to fund the war effort—the largest donation by weight of any Oxford college.

Magdalen College, commanding a position on the banks of the Cherwell that overlooked Magdalen Bridge and the road from London, had tactical significance for the King's forces. From 1643 to 1645, Magdalen's Grove was occupied by the Royalist ordnance, and Prince Rupert is thought to have quartered in the College.

The city built fortifications in preparation for siege through Magdalen's grounds, including Dover's Speare (or Pier), a bastion that would have allowed observation to the north and east of the city. The earthworks where it was located, in the Water Meadow where the Cherwell forks, are still apparent today. Further fortifications and earthworks were built to protect the Holywell Ford site to the north. During the first Siege of Oxford, Charles I surveyed the battle from Magdalen Tower.

Following the capitulation of Oxford to Thomas Fairfax at the end of the First English Civil War, Parliament ordered a Visitation to Oxford to purge Fellows for political and religious reasons. In 1647, the Visitors removed the then-president of Magdalen John Oliver and appointed instead one of their number, John Wilkinson, a former Principal of Magdalen Hall who had previously run unsuccessfully for the position of President at the College. When they refused to submit to the authority of Parliament, around 28 of the fellows, 21 of the demies (scholars), and all but one of the servants were also expelled. With the Royalists finally removed, the College would host Fairfax and Oliver Cromwell in 1649.

After the Restoration of the monarchy in 1660 John Oliver was reappointed to the College, followed by 17 fellows and eight demies.

=== Expulsion of the Fellows ===
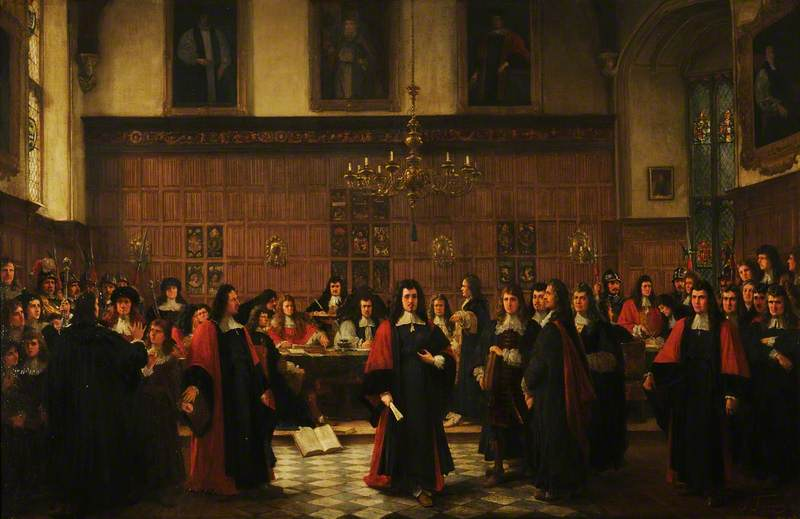
The Expulsion of the Fellows, 1687 by Joseph Tonneau (1884)

During the 1680s, King James II made several moves to reintroduce Catholicism into the then Anglican university. In 1687, he attempted to install Anthony Farmer as president of Magdalen. The fellows rejected this, not just because Farmer was reputedly a Catholic and had a tarnished reputation, but also as he was not a fellow of the College, and therefore ineligible under the statutes. The fellows elected instead one of their own, John Hough. James eventually offered a compromise candidate in the form of the moderate Bishop of Oxford, Samuel Parker, but he too was rejected by the fellows as they considered the role filled.

Parker was admitted by force and the fellows and demies who had defied the king were expelled, replaced by the king's choice of Catholics or moderate Anglicans. Parker died in 1688 and was replaced by Bonaventure Giffard, a Catholic under whose tenure the Chapel converted to Catholicism.

The expulsion of the fellows marked a turning point in the university's relationship with the Crown: Brockliss writes, "the royalist and Anglican University established at the Restoration had had to make a choice and it had chosen Anglicanism." James' interference with the College fed resentment in Anglicans who used it as evidence that his rule was autocratic. On 25 October 1688, shortly before the Glorious Revolution and overthrow of James II by William of Orange, James' appointments were reversed and Hough and the expelled fellows were restored to the College. This event is marked every year at a special banquet, the Restoration Dinner, for Magdalen fellows, demies, and academic clerks.

=== 20th–21st centuries ===
Magdalen's prominence since the mid-20th century owes much to such famous fellows as C. S. Lewis and A. J. P. Taylor, and its academic success to the work of such dons as Thomas Dewar Weldon. During World War II, RAF Maintenance Command was headquartered at Magdalen.

Magdalen College owns and manages the Oxford Science Park to the south of Oxford, a science and technology park home to over 100 companies. The Oxford Science Park opened in 1991, with Magdalen as part owner. The College acquired total ownership in 2016, before selling 40% of its stake in 2021 for £160 million. It was reported that this sale will more than double the size of Magdalen's endowment fund, and make it "probably the richest of Oxford's 39 colleges".

Like many of Oxford's colleges, Magdalen admitted its first mixed-sex cohort in 1979, after more than half a millennium as a men-only institution. Between 2015 and 2017, 47.2% of UK undergraduates admitted to Magdalen were from state schools; 12.2% were of BME ("black and ethnic minority") heritage and 0.7% were black. Of the 300 undergraduate offers made by Magdalen between 2017 and 2019, 25 (one in twelve) went to pupils from Eton College or Westminster School.

== Architecture ==
Map of Magdalen College buildings and grounds, marked out in black

The College grounds stretch north and east from the College, and include most of the area bounded by Longwall Street, the High Street (where the porter's lodge is located), and St Clement's. The College features a variety of architectural styles, and has been described as "a medieval nucleus with two incomplete additions, one from the eighteenth and one from the nineteenth century".

The College is organised around five quads. The irregularly shaped St John's Quad is the first on entering the College, and includes the Outdoor Pulpit and old Grammar Hall. It connects to the Great Quad (the Cloister) via the Perpendicular Gothic Founders Tower, which is richly decorated with carvings and pinnacles and has carved bosses in its vault. The Chaplain's Quad runs along the side of the Chapel and Hall, to the foot of the Great Tower. St Swithun's Quad and Longwall Quad (which contains the Library) date from the late 19th and early 20th centuries, and make up the southwest corner of the College.

=== Original buildings ===
The College is built on the site of St John the Baptist Hospital, which was dissolved in 1457 and its property granted to William of Waynflete. Some of the hospital buildings were reused by the College, and the kitchens survive today as the College bar, the Old Kitchen Bar.

New construction began in 1470 with the erection of a wall around the site by mason William Orchard. Following this, Orchard also worked on the chapel, hall, and the cloister, including the Muniment and Founder's Towers, with work completed around 1480.

=== Cloister ===
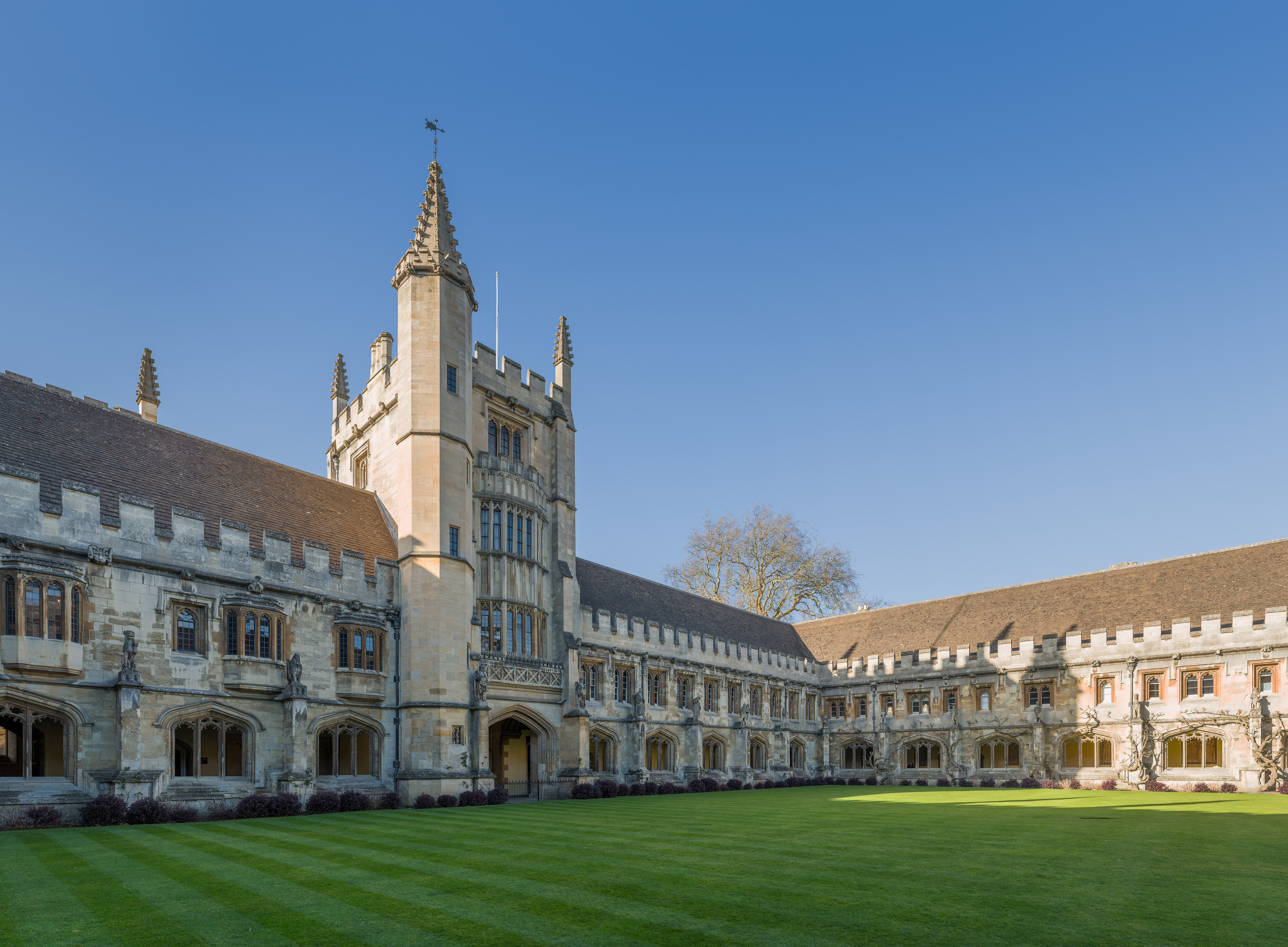
The Cloister and Founders' Tower

The Cloister or Great Quad is the "medieval nucleus" of the College. It was constructed between 1474 and 1480, also by Orchard, although several modifications were made later. Access to the Cloister from St John's Quad is via the Founder's Tower or Muniment Tower. The chapel and the hall make up the southern side of the quad. It is also home to the junior, middle, and senior common rooms, and the old library.

In 1508, grotesques known as hieroglyphics were added to the Cloister. These are thought to be allegorical, and include four hieroglyphics in front of the old library that represent scholarly subjects: science, medicine, law, and theology. The other hieroglyphics have been assigned symbolism relating to virtues that should be encouraged by the College (i.e., the lion and pelican grotesques in front of the Senior Common Room representing courage and parental affection) or vices that should be avoided (the manticore, boxers, and lamia in front of the Junior Common Room, representing pride, contention, and lust). In 2017, repair work was undertaken to restore the severely damaged boxers statue.

In 1822, the north side of the Cloister was knocked down, ostensibly due to disrepair. This decision was controversial, provoking protests from the fellows and in the contemporary press, and it was rebuilt shortly afterwards.

In the early 1900s, renovations were performed, and it was returned to a more medieval character. Student rooms were installed in the (very large) roof space in the 1980s.

=== Chapel ===
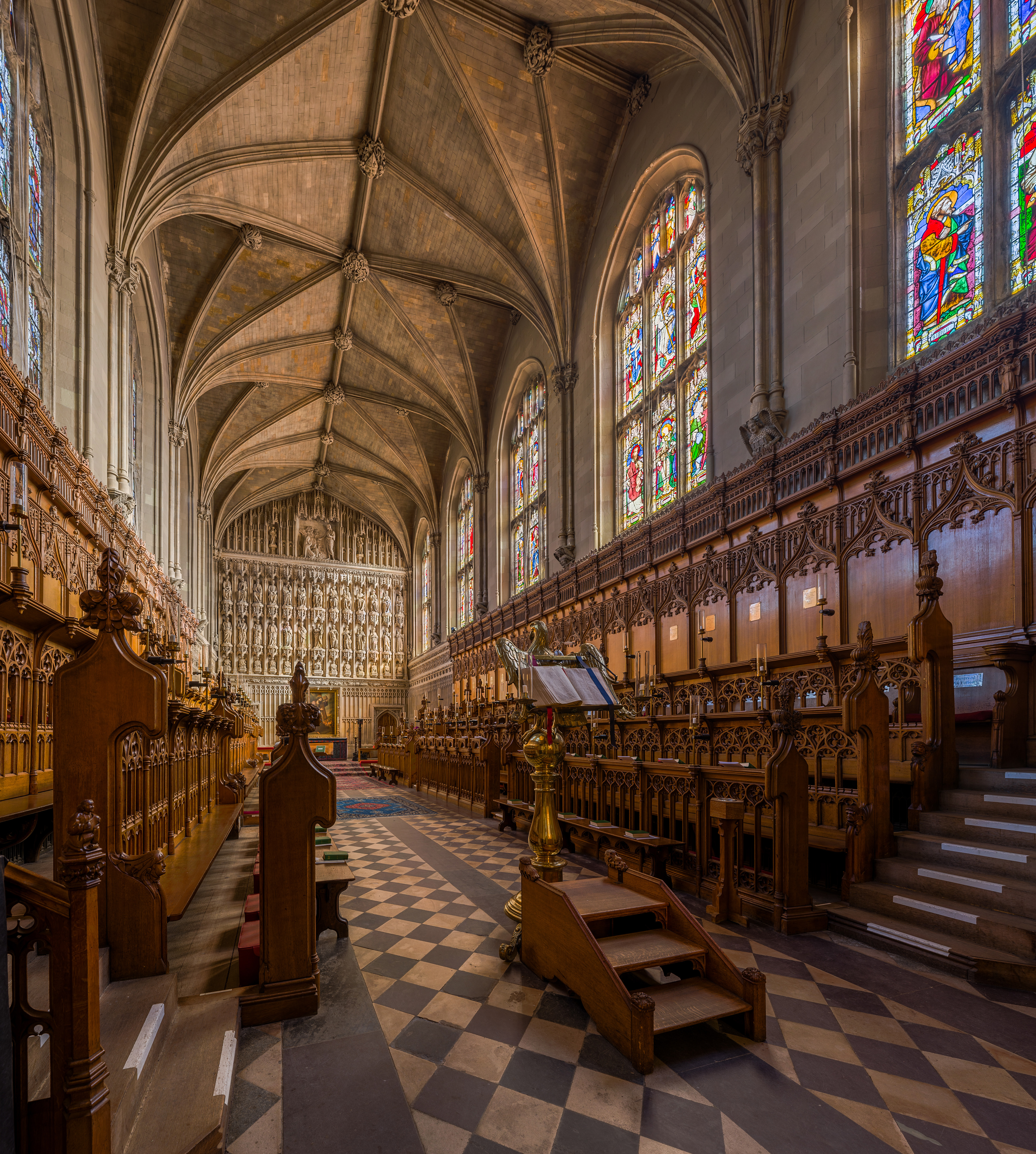
The interior of the chapel, showing Wyatt's plaster roof

The chapel is a place of worship for members of the College and others in the University of Oxford community and beyond. As a High Anglican chapel, its tradition is influenced by the Counter-Reformation in the Church of England. Said and sung services are held daily during term. The choir sings Choral Evensong or Evening Prayer every day at 6:00 p.m. except on Mondays. On Sundays, a Sung Eucharist is offered in the morning at 11:00 a.m. Compline (Night Prayer) is sung once each week, and is followed by a service of Benediction twice per term. Mass is also sung on major holy days.

The chapel itself is a grade I listed building. It was built between 1474 and 1480, although it owes its present appearance largely to neo-Gothic works carried out in the 18th and 19th centuries.

Vaulting

The roof, giving the impression of a stone vaulted ceiling, is in fact a facsimile made from plaster added in 1790 by neo-Gothic architect James Wyatt. Wyatt's redevelopment of the chapel included a number of modifications to make it more Gothic in character, but other than the ceiling, Wyatt's contributions were removed during a later redesign in 1828.

Reredos

After 1662, a painting (or possibly a mural) of the Last Judgement by Isaac Fuller was placed at the east end. This piece of work was taken down during architect Lewis Cottingham's work in the early 1830s, and fragments of the original reredos were discovered behind it. These showed that the original reredos had had three tiers of niches, each tier containing thirteen niches. Cottingham replaced Isaac Fuller's painting at the east end with the current reredos, the layout of which was based on those remains. This reredos remained void of figures until 1864/5, when it was completed by neo-Gothic sculptor Thomas Earp.

Stained glass windows

The stained glass windows facing St John's Quad feature a grisaille depiction of the Last Judgement. These windows, dating from 1792, are a reconstruction by glass painter Francis Eginton of an earlier 17th-century window that was destroyed in a storm. It had been uninstalled during World War II to protect it from damage, and was only restored in the 1990s. Much of the glass had been thought lost, until it was rediscovered in the ventilation tunnels under the New Building.

=== Magdalen Tower ===
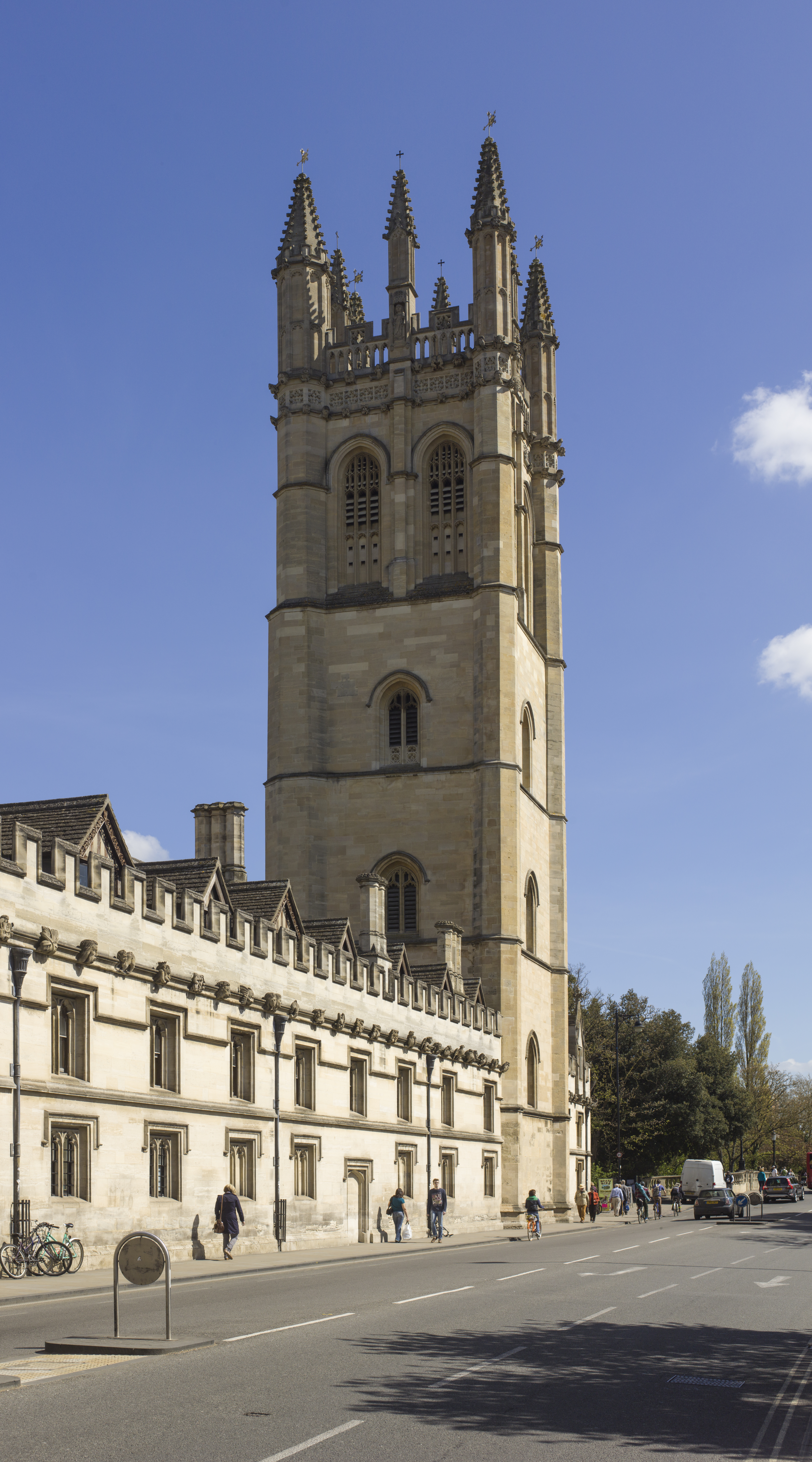
Magdalen College Tower

Construction of Magdalen's Great Tower began in 1492 by another mason, William Raynold. It might have been intended to replace an existing belfry remaining from the hospital, and probably was originally envisioned to stand alone. By the time it was completed in 1509, additional buildings had been built either side, creating the roughly triangular Chaplain's quad between the chapel and the High.

The tower contains a peal of ten bells hung for English change ringing. They were cast at a number of different foundries and the heaviest, weighing 17 cwt, was cast in 1623.

The tower is 144 feet tall and an imposing landmark on the eastern approaches to the city centre. It has been the model for other towers, including Mitchell Tower of the University of Chicago, Manhattan's First Presbyterian Church, and All Saints' Church in Churchill, Oxfordshire. It forms the centre of the May Morning celebrations in Oxford, from which the choir sing pieces including the Hymnus Eucharisticus and the Dean of Divinity blesses the University, city, and crowds.

=== The New Building ===
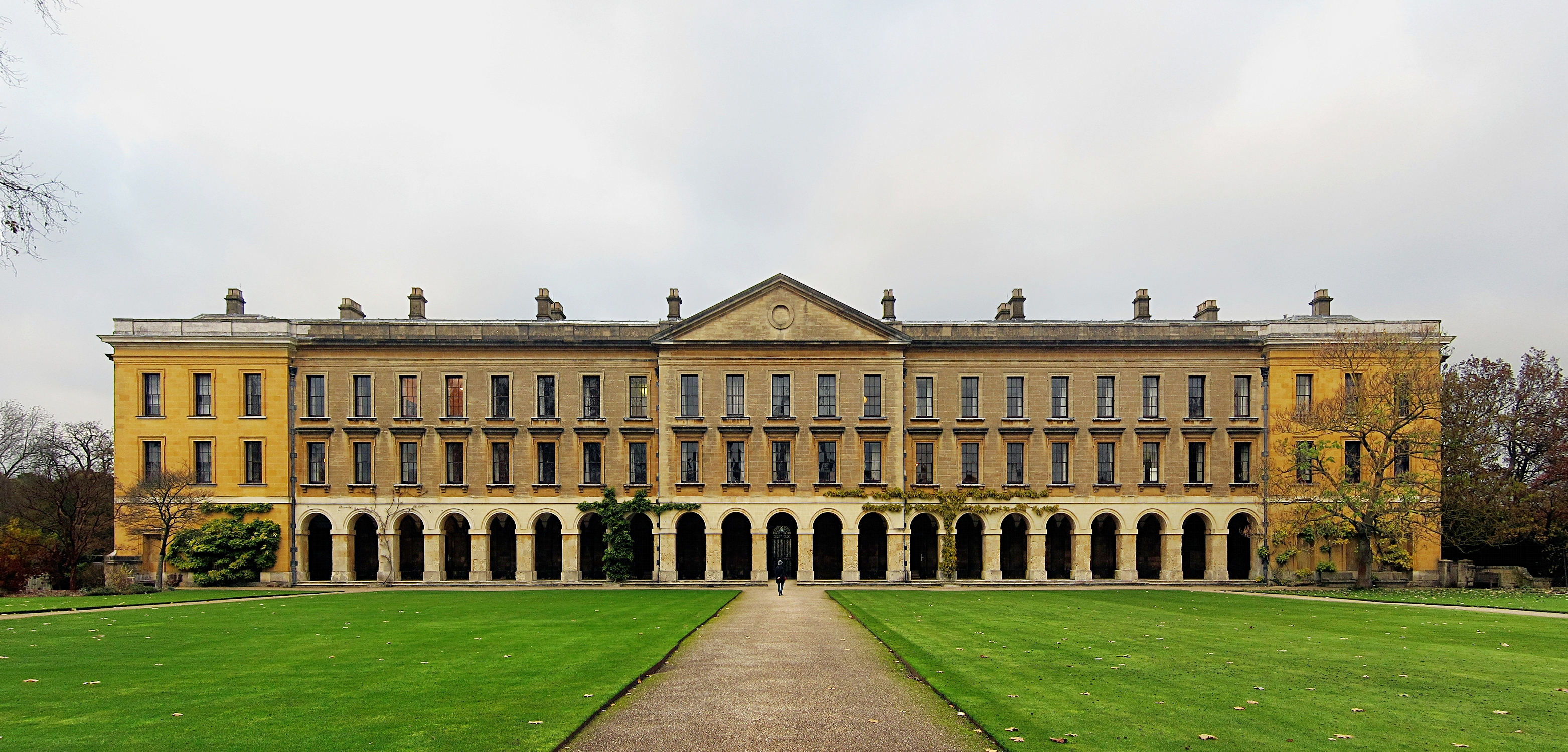
The New Building

During the 18th and 19th centuries, there were numerous attempts made to redesign the site to better suit the College's needs. The New Building began construction in 1733 as a part of Edward Holdsworth's designs from 1731. It is built in a Palladian style, and features a colonnade.

It was conceived as one side of a new "Great Quadrangle", and in anticipation of this the building's ends had been left unfinished. However, Holdsworth's full vision was never completed. The idea was revisited several times by later architects, including by architects James Wyatt—whose plans (never realised) included partially demolishing the existing, Medieval quad (the Cloister) and refinishing the neoclassical New Building in a Georgian Gothic style—and John Buckler. In the 19th century, John Nash and Humphrey Repton both submitted designs for new, open quadrangles that incorporated the New Building.

Ultimately, the idea of integrating the New Building into a new quad was abandoned, and the ends of the building were finally completed in 1824 with two returns designed by Thomas Harrison. Today, it stands apart from the Cloister, overlooking four croquet lawns on one side and the Grove deer park on the other. It is used for accommodation for undergraduates and fellows, including historically Edward Gibbon and C. S. Lewis, and also houses the wine cellar.

=== Daubeny laboratory ===
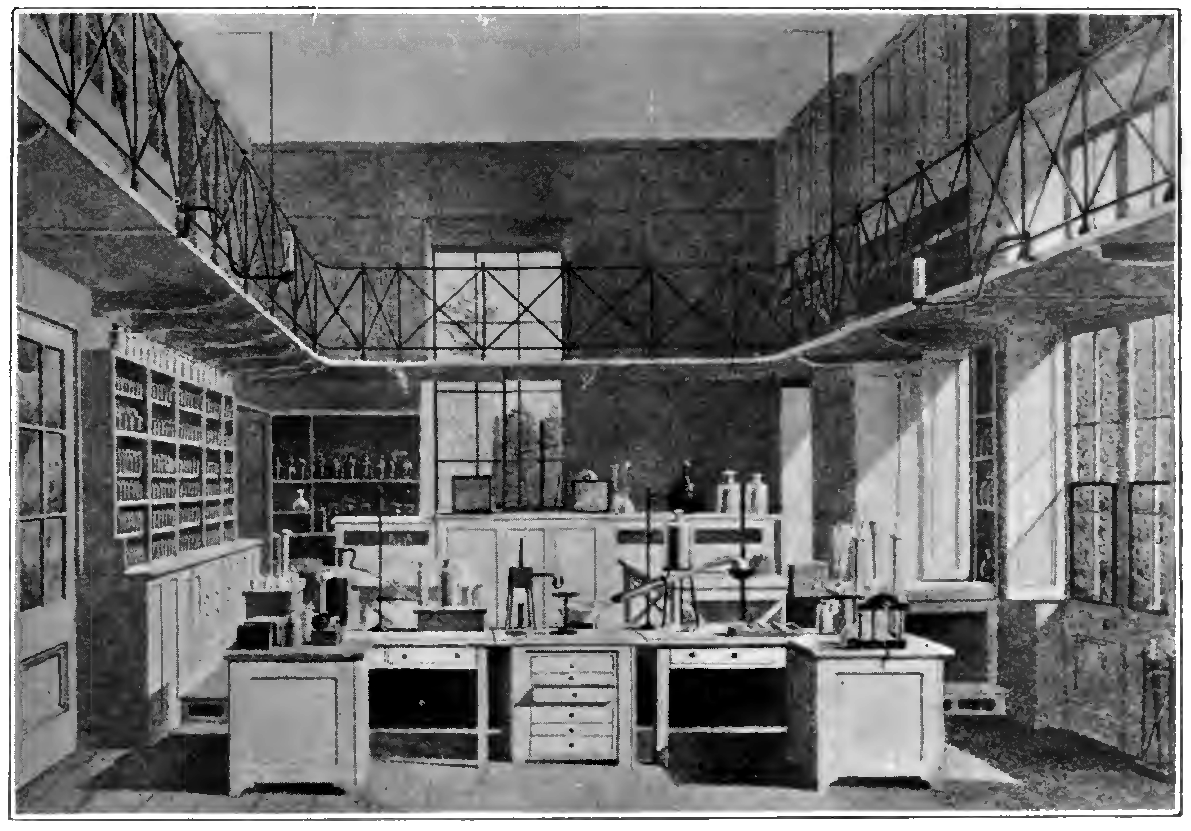
Illustration of the Daubeny Laboratory as it looked c. 1870

Opposite the main college site and overlooking the Botanic Garden is the 19th century Daubeny Laboratory.

The Garden had been established between 1622 and 1633 as a physic garden (that is, a garden to study the medicinal value of plants) on land inherited by Magdalen from St. John's Hospital. The Daubeny Laboratory, and neighbouring Professor's House, were founded by the polymath and Magdalen fellow Charles Daubeny after he was appointed to the Sherardian Chair of Botany in 1834.

Daubeny set about a number of additions to the location, erecting new glasshouses and in 1836 creating an on-site residence for the Professor of Botany. This replaced an earlier residence that had been demolished in 1795 when the road was widened. The new residence was an extension of the library, which had been created out of a glasshouse by an earlier Sherardian professor, John Sibthorp, to house the Sherard herbarium. After Daubeny's death, this was assimilated to house the growing collection. Later, it became accommodation for graduate students, the Professor's House, while the Sherard Herbarium is now part of the Fielding-Druce Herbarium held in the Department of Plant Sciences.

Daubeny, who was also the Aldrichian Professor of Chemistry, had found the chemistry laboratory in the basement of the old Ashmolean Museum, what is now the History of Science Museum, to be "notoriously unworthy of a great University" and desired a better science facility. He petitioned the college to be allowed to build one, and the Daubeny laboratory was completed in 1848. The Daubeny Laboratory was preceded by the anatomy school and laboratory at Christ Church which opened in 1767, and would be followed later in the century by other college laboratories including the Balliol-Trinity Laboratories. Daubeny's laboratory was a two-storey room with benches and cupboards encircled by a gallery, and became the principal chemistry lab for the university. In 1902, due to growing student numbers and poor ventilation, the laboratory trappings were removed and it was refitted as a lecture hall. In 1973, most of the Daubeny Laboratory building was reconfigured into graduate student accommodation. The Daubeny lab itself is now a conference space.

=== St Swithun's quad ===
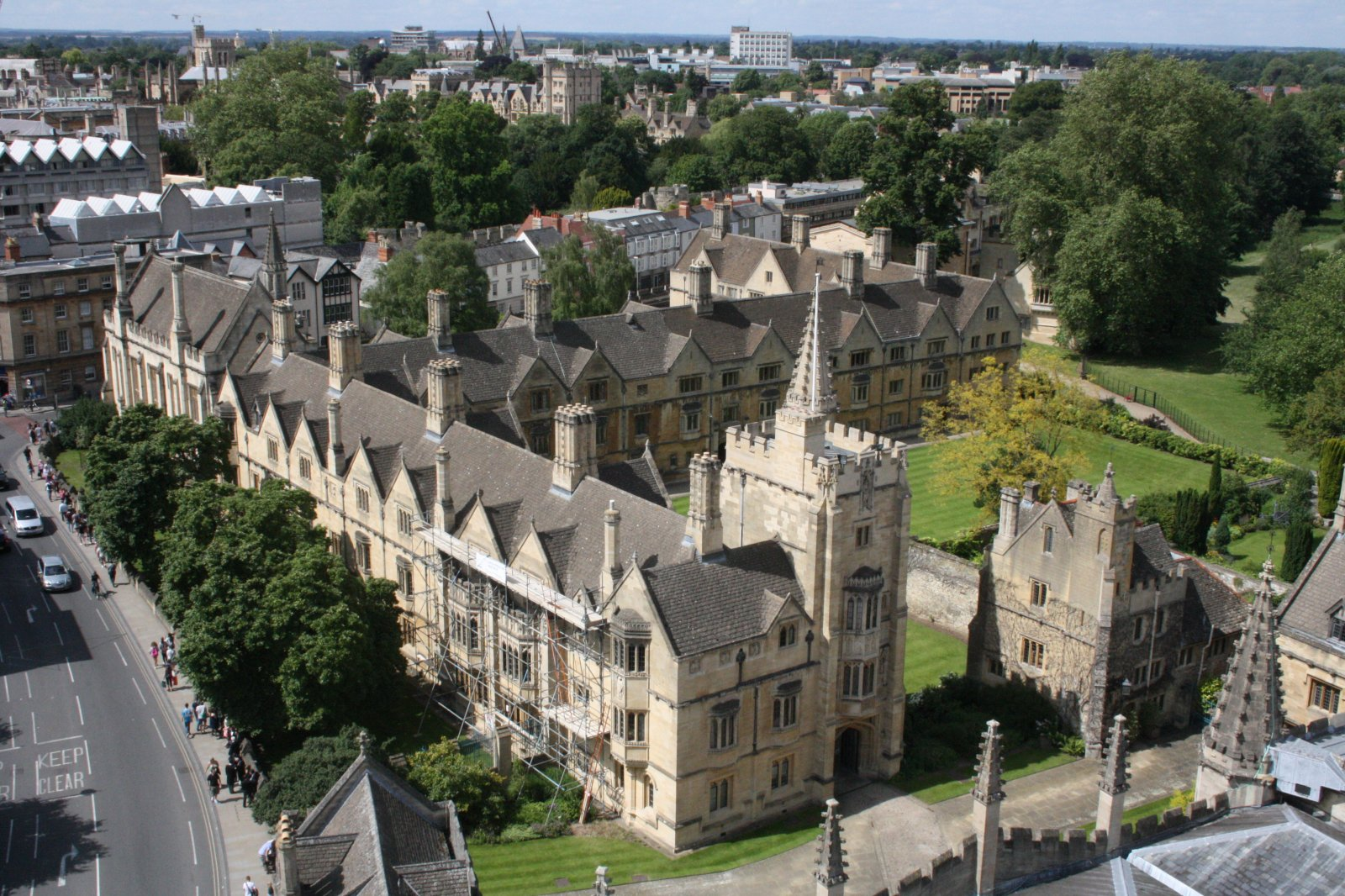
A view from the Great Tower of St Swithun's Quad, and behind it Longwall Quad

In 1880–1884, the college extended westwards onto the former site of Magdalen Hall. The hall was an independent academic hall that developed from Magdalen College School, not the earlier Magdalen Hall founded by William Waynflete. Most of Magdalen Hall's buildings were destroyed by fire in 1820, though the Grammar Hall survived and was restored by Joseph Parkinson. The hall moved to Catte Street in 1822 and was incorporated as Hertford College in 1874.

The new construction, St Swithun's quad (sometimes given as St. Swithin's quad), was designed by George Frederick Bodley and Thomas Garner in keeping with the Gothic style. They had originally designed three sides of a square, though only the south and west sides were built. In 1928, Giles Gilbert Scott extended the building north and westwards, forming the adjacent Longwall quad.

=== Modern buildings and acquisitions ===
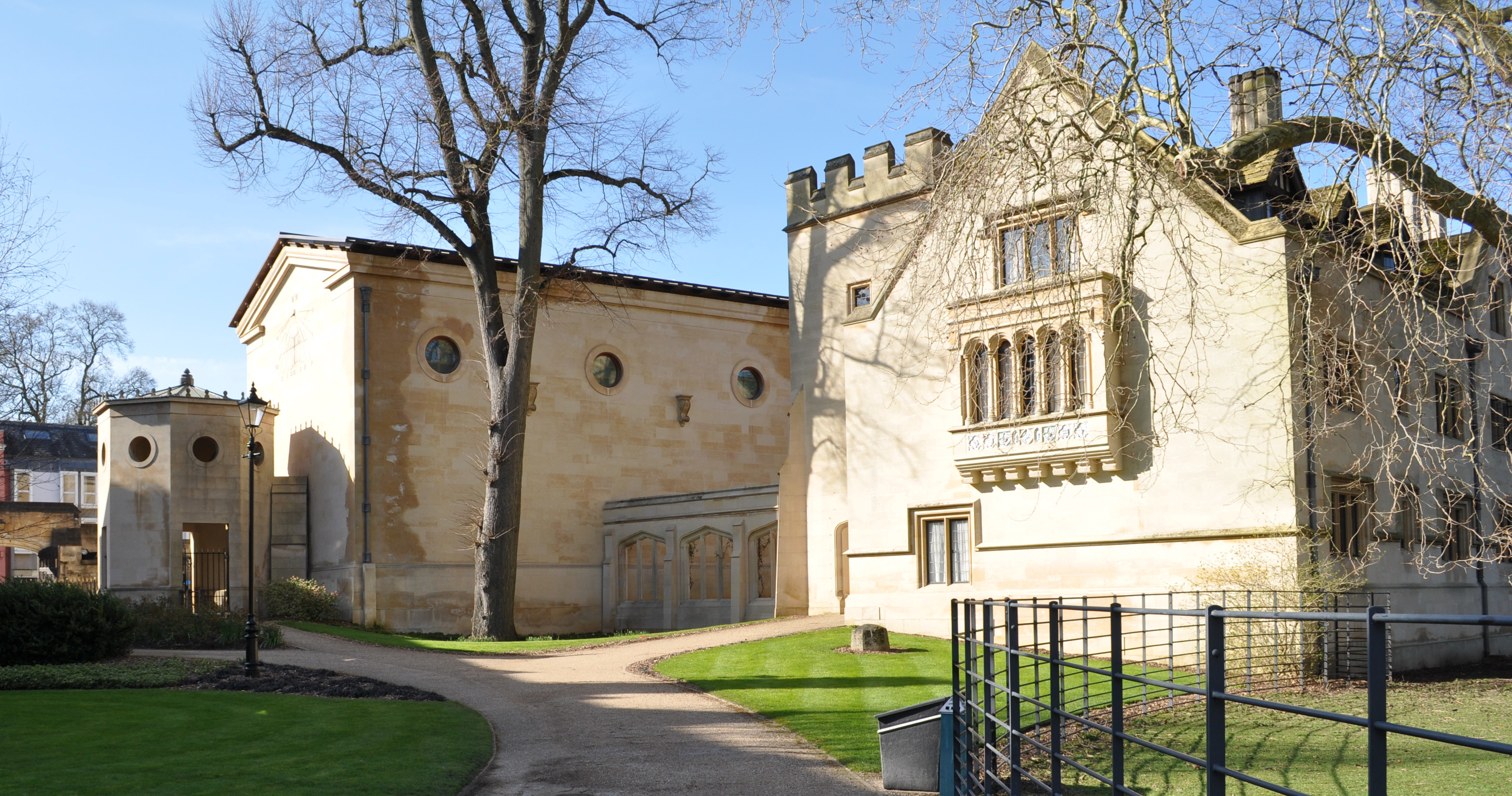
The Grove Buildings, including the auditorium (left), were completed in 1999.

Several new additions to the college were made in the late 20th century. The Waynflete Building, which was located across Magdalen Bridge from the main college site before being demolished in December 2025, was designed by Booth, Ledeboer, and Pinckheard and completed in 1964. Magdalen has a number of additional annexes near to the main site for accommodation, including in Cowley Place and Longwall Street.

The Grove Buildings, located north of Longwall quad between Longwall Street and the Grove, were built in 1994–1999 by Porphyrios Associates. They are home to accommodation, Magdalen's 160-seat auditorium, and the Denning Law Library. During term time, the auditorium hosts film screenings organised by the Magdalen Film Society.

Along Addison's Walk is the Holywell Ford site, where most of the graduate accommodation is located. Holywell Ford house was built by Clapton Crabb Rolfe in 1888 on the location of an older mill, and was acquired by Magdalen in the 1970s. Additional blocks of accommodation were built in 1994-5 by RH Partnership Ltd.

=== Libraries ===
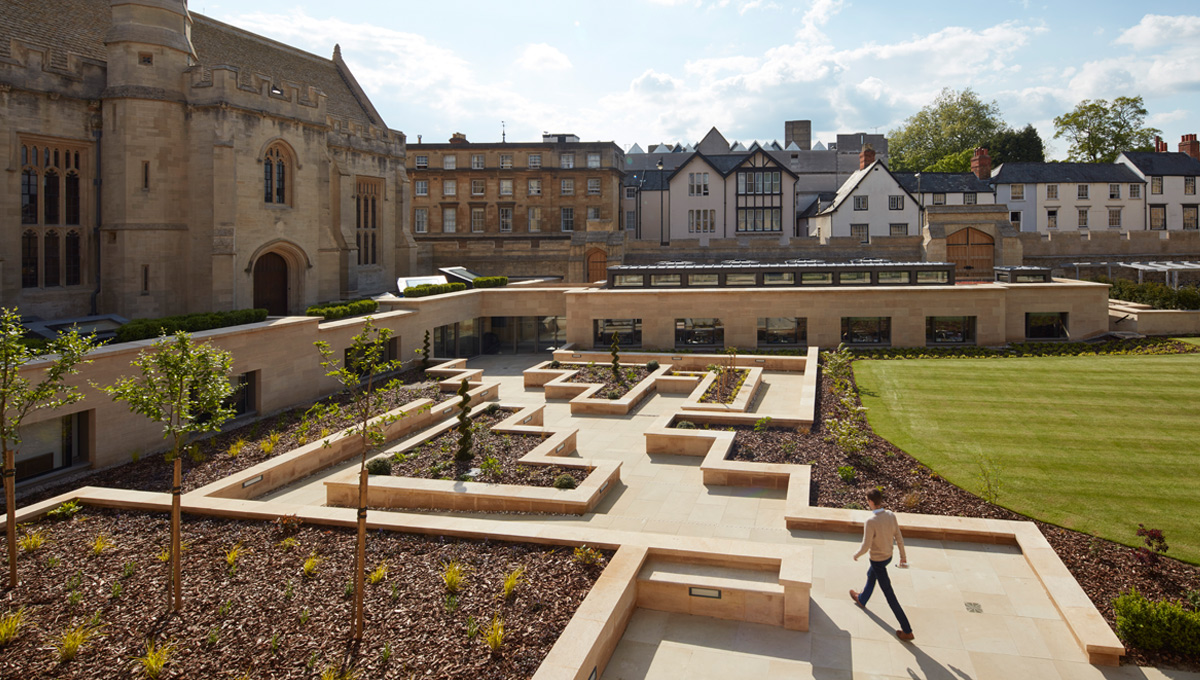
The redeveloped Longwall Quad. The main Longwall Library building is on the left.

In addition to the university's central and departmental libraries, Oxford's colleges maintain their own libraries. The original college library, the Old Library, is located in the Cloister and accessed via Founder's Tower or the President's Lodgings. It contains a large collection of manuscripts from before the 19th century. Consultation of material is typically by appointment, although the Old Library itself may be visited by the public during certain exhibitions.

In 1931, the New Library, now called the Longwall Library, was established in the former Magdalen College School building in Longwall Quad and became the college's main library for students. It was opened by Edward VIII when he was a student at Magdalen. It was renovated between 2014 and 2016 by Wright & Wright Architects and reopened by Prince William, Duke of Cambridge.

In addition, the college maintains the Denning Law Library in the Grove building, a reference library for Magdalen's law students, and the specialist Daubeny and McFarlane collections of 19th century scientific works and medieval history works respectively. Items from the Daubeny and McFarlane libraries may be brought to the Longwall Library for consultation on request.

== Grounds ==
=== The Grove ===
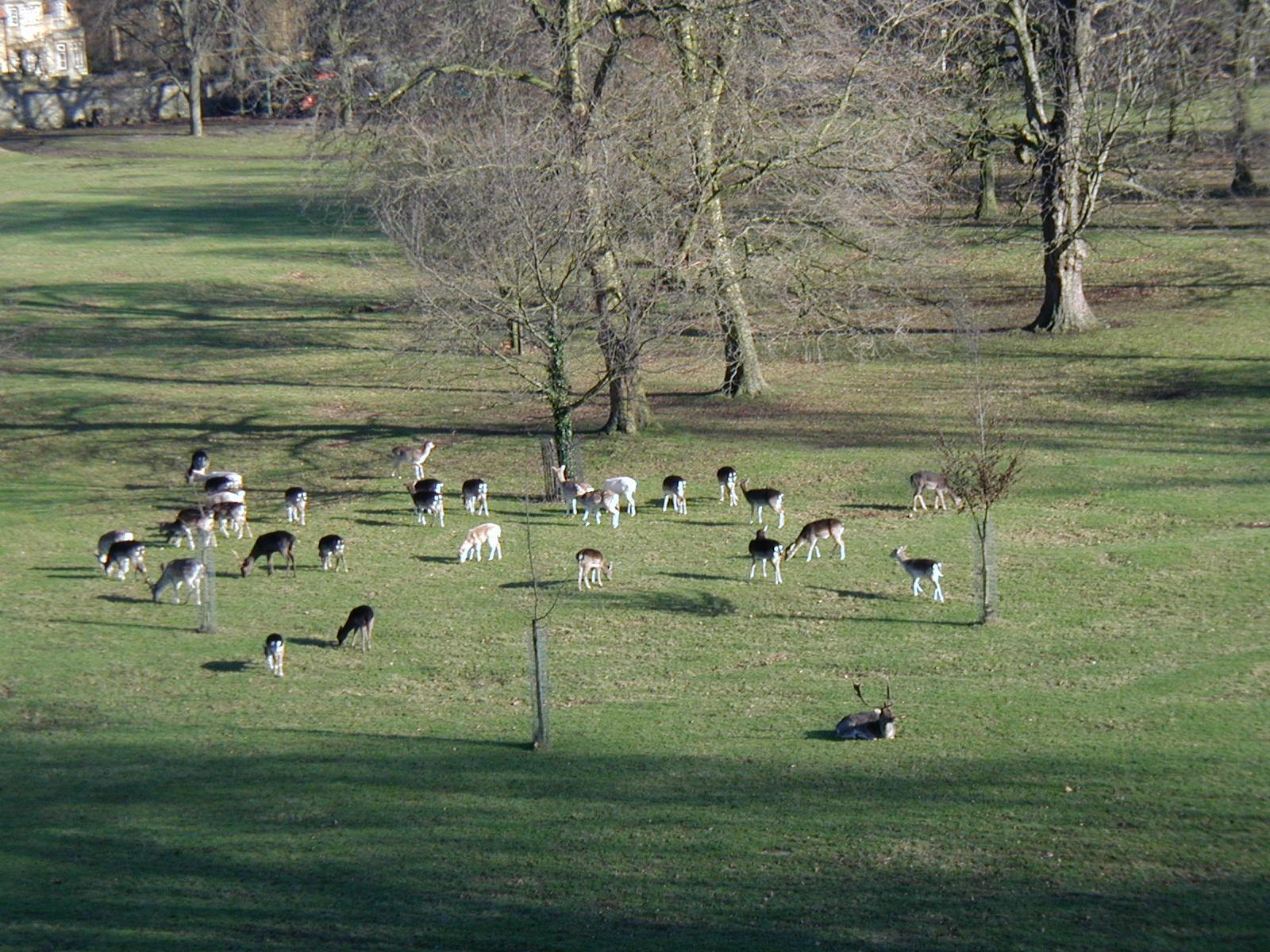
The deer in the Grove

The Grove or deer park is a large meadow which occupies most of the north west of the college's grounds, from the New Building and the Grove Buildings to Holywell Ford. During the winter and spring, it is the home of a herd of fallow deer. It is possible to view the meadow and the deer from the path between New Buildings and Grove Quad, and also from the archway in New Buildings.

In the 16th Century, as recorded in a map from 1578, the Grove consisted of formal enclosed gardens, tree-lined avenues, an orchard, and a fish pond. By 1630, a bowling green had replaced the orchard.

During the Civil War, between 1642 and 1645, the Grove became home to the workshops, forges, and foundries of Royal Ordinance. Following this, the landscaping began to transition from formal gardens to more natural parkland, and the water walks were landscaped. Deer began being cultivated in the college by at least the 1720s, and by the early 19th century the formal gardens had completely disappeared and college Fellow Dr Bloxham noted that the entire Grove had been given over to the deer.

At one point in the 19th century it was home to three traction engines belonging to the works department of the college. By the 20th century it had become well-wooded with many large trees, but most of them were lost to Dutch elm disease in the 1970s.

=== Water meadow and Addison's Walk ===
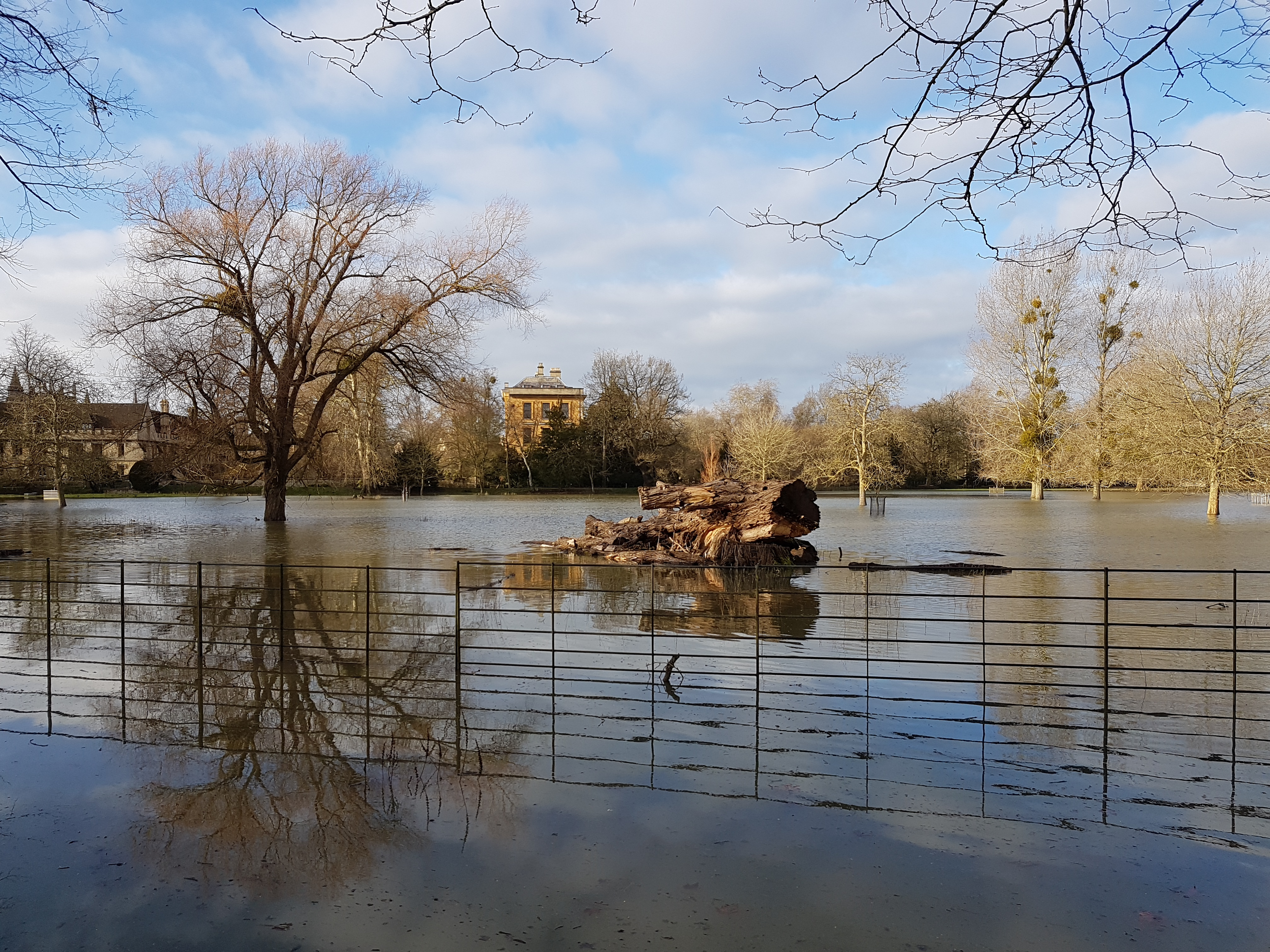
Water meadow after winter flooding. The New Building is visible side on in the background.

The water meadow is a flood-meadow to the eastern side of the college, bounded on all sides by the Cherwell. In wet winters, some or all of the meadow may flood, as the meadow is lower lying than the surrounding path. All around the edge of the meadow is a tree-lined path, Addison's Walk, named for the fellow Joseph Addison (1672–1719), which connects to Holywell Ford and the Fellows' Garden.

Addison's Walk is popular with College members and visitors. C. S. Lewis wrote a poem about the walk, Chanson d'Aventure or What the Bird Said Early in the Year, which is commemorated on a plaque near the gate to Holywell Ford.

Thanks to the frequent flooding, the meadow is one of the few places in the UK that the snake's head fritillary, Fritillaria meleagris, may be seen growing wild. These flowers grow in very few places, and have been recorded growing in the meadow since around 1785. Once the flowering has finished, the deer herd is moved in for the summer and autumn.

=== Bat Willow meadow and the Fellows' Garden ===
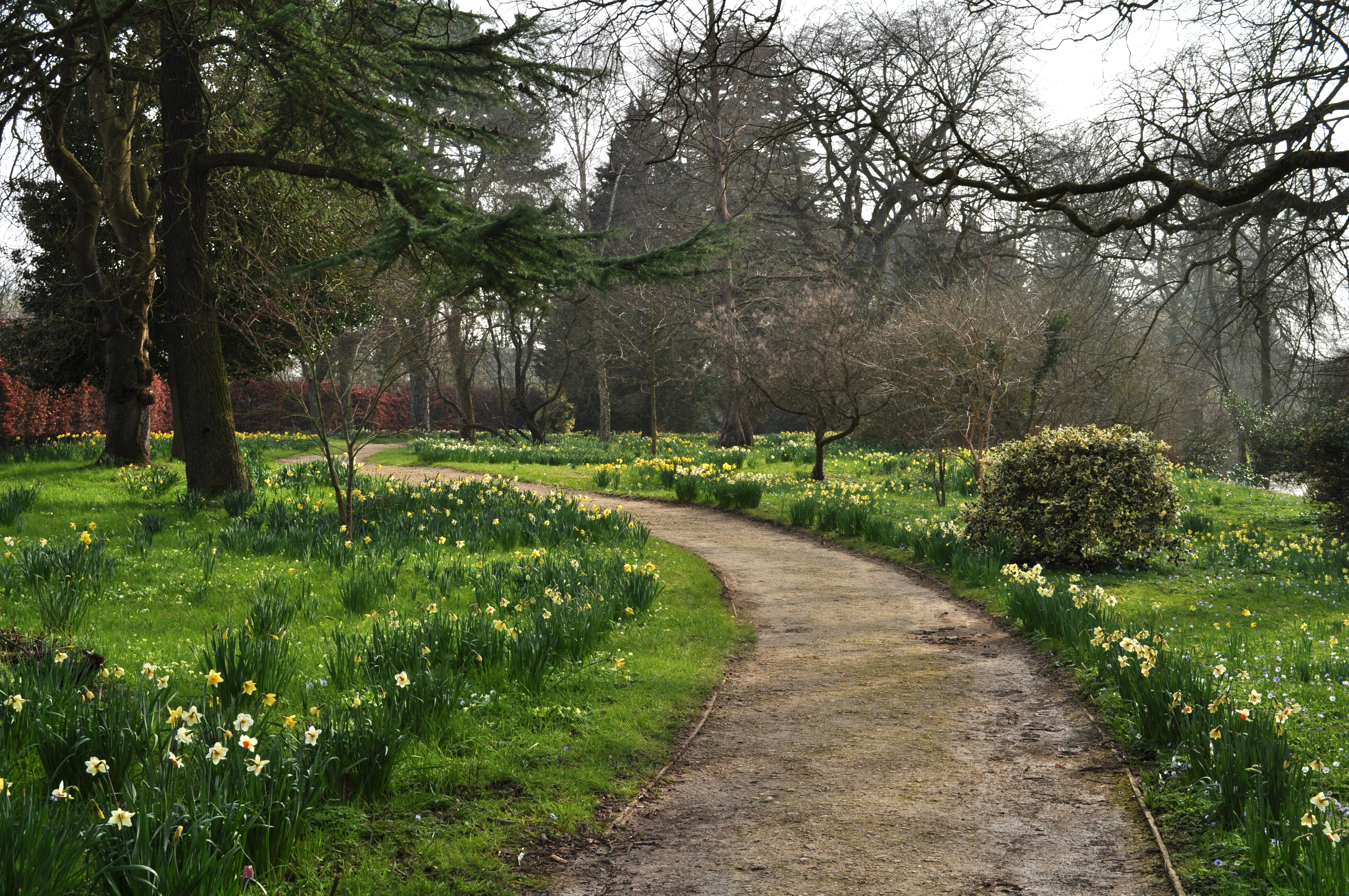
The Fellows' Garden

Further east of the water meadow are Bat Willow meadow and the Fellows' Garden. They are separated from the water meadow and each other by other branches of the Cherwell, and may be accessed from Addison's Walk. Bat Willow meadow features Y, a 10 metre high sculpture of a branching tree by Mark Wallinger, commissioned for the college's 550th anniversary in 2008. Due to their age and infection with honey fungus, the willow trees were cut down in 2018 and replanted, and the wood used to make cricket bats.

The Fellows' Garden is located further north along the bank of the Cherwell than Bat Willow meadow, directly behind the Oxford Centre for Islamic Studies. This long and narrow garden follows the Cherwell to the edge of the University Parks. Further north is Magdalen's sports ground.

== Choir ==
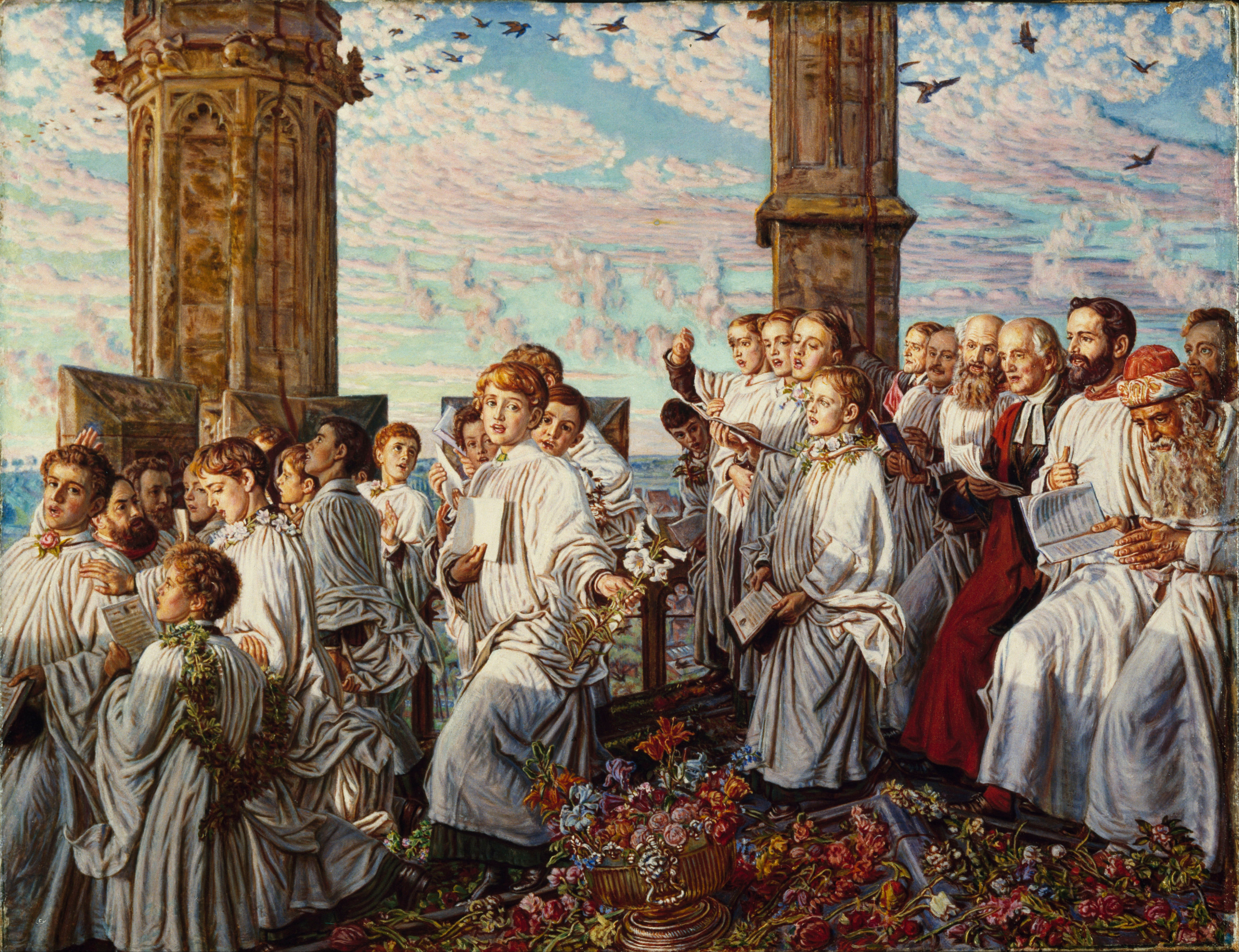
May Morning on Magdalen Tower by William Holman Hunt (1890)

Magdalen is one of the three choral foundations in Oxford, meaning that the formation of the choir was part of the statutes of the college, the other choral foundations being New College and Christ Church. It performs during chapel services, college gaudies and at other special events throughout the year. As part of Oxford's annual May Morning in a tradition that dates back 500 years, at 6 a.m. on 1 May, the choir perform Hymnus Eucharisticus from the top of Magdalen's Tower to crowds below on Magdalen Bridge and the High Street.

The choir consists of twelve academical clerks, or choral scholars, and two organ scholars, who are all students at the college, and sixteen choristers, all of whom have scholarships at Magdalen College School, and is led by a director of music known as the Informator Choristarum, currently Mark Williams. Mark Williams succeeded Daniel Hyde in 2017, following Hyde's appointment as Organist and Director of Music of Saint Thomas Church, New York. Among the other former directors of the choir are John Sheppard (1543–c.1552), John Varley Roberts, Sir William McKie, Haldane Campbell Stewart and the composer Bill Ives (1991–2009).

Past academical clerks include John Mark Ainsley, Harry Christophers (founder and director of The Sixteen), James Whitbourn, Peter Harvey, Robin Blaze, Paul Agnew, Roderick Williams and conductor/composer Gregory Rose. The choir has had many well-known organists, such as Daniel Purcell, Sir John Stainer (1860–1872) and Bernard Rose (1957–1981). Past organ scholars include Dudley Moore and Paul Brough.

As well as performing during chapel services, the choir tours and records music. In 2005, the choir was nominated for a Grammy Award for its CD, With a Merrie Noyse, of music by Orlando Gibbons. Other recent works include the BBC's The Blue Planet and Paul McCartney's classical piece Ecce Cor Meum.

== Student life ==
=== Accommodation ===
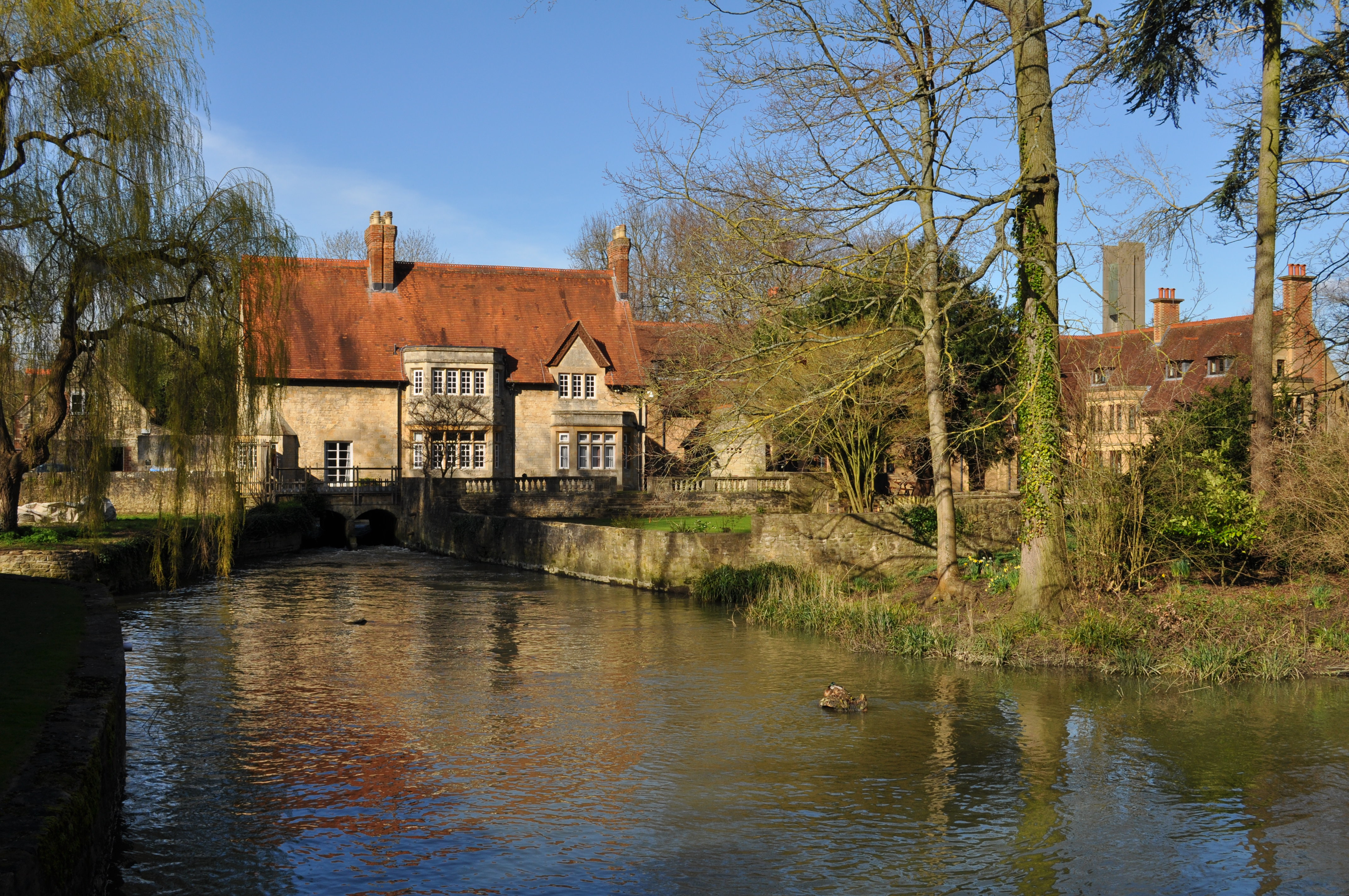
Holywell Ford, as seen from Addison's Walk. Holywell Ford house and annexes are used as accommodation for graduate students.

Undergraduate students of the College are guaranteed accommodation during term for their entire degree, typically in St Swithun's Quad and Longwall Quad in their first year and "inside-walls" in the Cloister, St Swithun's Quad, the New Building and in houses on the High Street and Longwall Street in subsequent years. Graduate students are guaranteed at least two years of accommodation. Unlike undergraduates, graduates are not required to move out between terms and typically live "outside walls", including in Holywell Ford, the Daubeny Laboratory, and Professor's House.

Accommodation charges are inclusive of heating, power, and internet access, and weekly cleaning by the College scouts (housekeepers), but do not include catering. Three cafeteria-style meals a day are served in the hall, and other food is available in the Old Kitchen Bar.

In addition to a dinner cafeteria service served in the hall, four Formal Halls are held a week during term time. These are three-course sit-down dinners and require college members to wear their gowns. Additional banquets commemorate special occasions, including the Restoration Dinner.

=== Events and societies ===
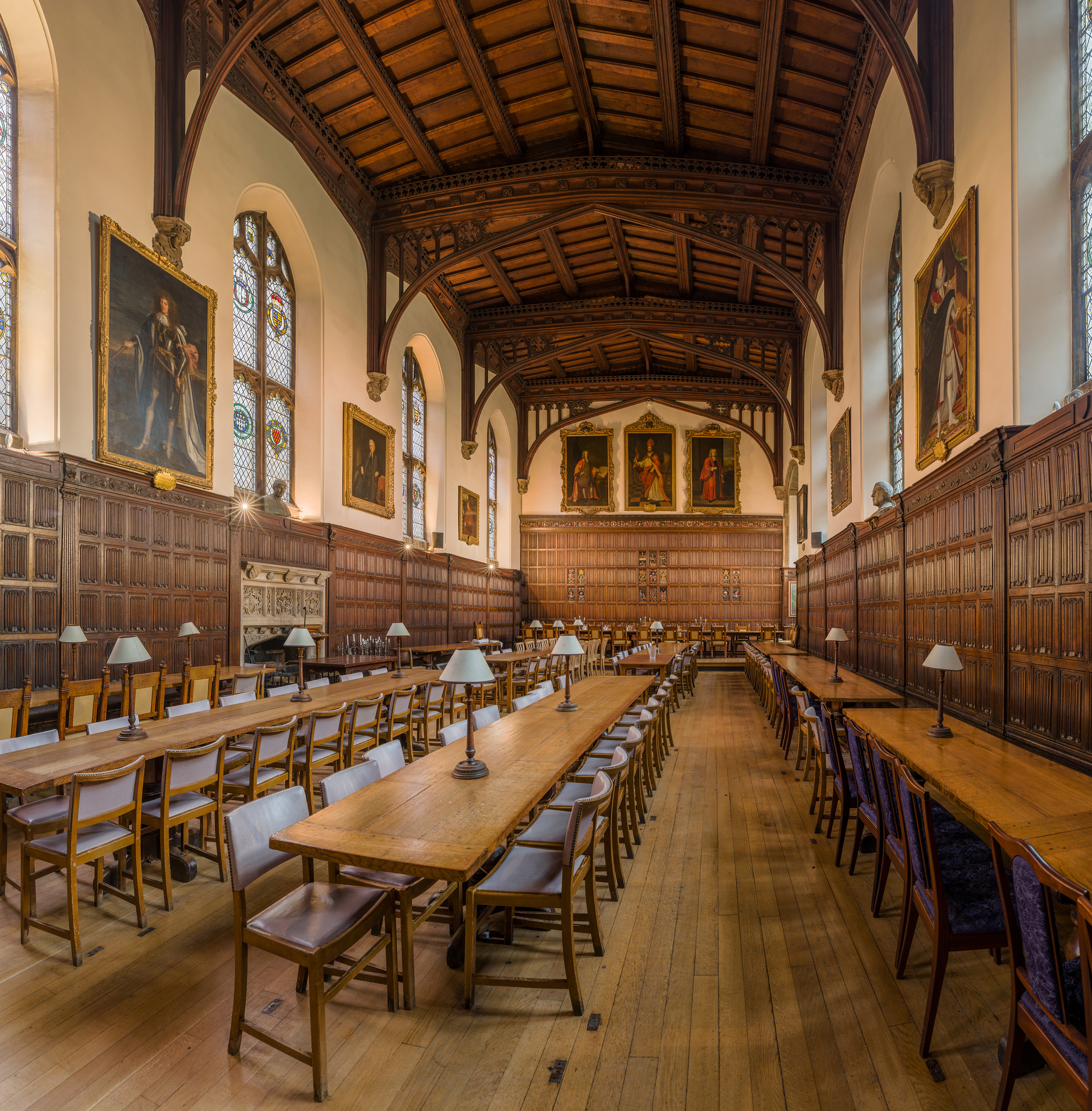
Magdalen College dining hall, where students can eat meals, also hosts regular formal banquets.

The bodies of undergraduate and graduate students are known as the junior and middle common rooms (JCR and MCR), and respectively. They each elect committees of students annually to organise welfare events, socials, and banquets.

In addition to clubs and societies associated with the Oxford University Student Union operated at the university level, Magdalen members may also participate in several college societies. The Atkin Society and the Sherrington Society are two subject-specific societies, for law students and medicine students respectively. They organise talks and social events. The Atkin society is named for lawyer James Atkin, Baron Atkin, a former demy at Magdalen, and also organises annually a Christmas Dinner for its members, moot court presided over by a guest judge, and summer garden party. The Sherrington Society is named after Nobel laureate Sir Charles Scott Sherrington, former Waynflete Professor of Physiology. The college also has a poetry discussion forum called the Florio Society, named for 16th century college alumnus John Florio.

A number of other societies put on events throughout the year. These include the Magdalen Players, a drama society; the Magdalen Music Society; and the Magdalen Film Society, which screens films during term time in the Grove Auditorium. The Magdalen College Music Society is a chapter of the Oxford University Music Society and incorporates a non-auditioned mixed choir, a chamber orchestra, and a saxophone ensemble. The society performs recitals in college on Thursdays during term time.

The Magdalen College Trust is an independent charity that is funded by annual subscriptions from students and fellows. It encourages college members to engage in charity work and funds charitable causes.

=== Academia ===
In the Norrington Table's history, Magdalen has been top three times, in 2010, 2012, and 2015. When over half its finalists achieved firsts in 2010, it claimed the record for the highest ever Norrington Score. Magdalen has the second highest average Norrington Table score from 2006 to 2019, only behind Merton College.

Magdalen College students have a successful record in the University Challenge television competition, winning on four occasions (1997, 1998, 2004, and 2011). This is the joint highest number of series wins, tied with Manchester University, and at the time of Magdalen's third win no other institution had won more than twice.

Unlike at most other colleges, students awarded a scholarship at Magdalen are officially referred to as Demies.

=== Sports ===
Magdalen members have access to a variety of sports facilities. The Magdalen College Recreation Ground, accessible from the main college via Addison's Walk, includes pitches for cricket, soccer, hockey, and rugby; also available on site are tennis courts and squash courts. The Recreation Ground played host to a first-class cricket match in 1912, when Oxford played the touring South Africans. The match was heavily affected by rain and ended in a draw, but did see Oxford's John Evans make scores of 56 and 107, in addition to taking a five wicket haul in the South Africans' first innings. During the First World War, there were talks between the College and the local allotment association to turn the ground into allotments to aid the war effort, but both parties were unable to reach an agreement.

In addition, the College buys gym membership at the Iffley Road sports complex on behalf of all its students. The College keeps a boathouse on The Isis (the length of the Thames as it passes through Oxford) for the Magdalen College Boat Club (MCBC).

The Magdalen College Boat Club (MCBC), a rowing club, was founded in 1859. It participates in the two annual Oxford bumps races, Eights Week and Torpids. In recent history, the MCBC men's rowers won Eights Week between 2004 and 2007, and the Torpids most recently in 2008 (for the men's rowers) and 2016 (women's). As well as the MCBC, Magdalen College is represented by teams in football, hockey, rugby, netball, cricket, lacrosse, squash and pool, amongst others.

=== College stamp ===
A college stamp was issued in the 1960s and the 1970s to prepay local delivery of mail by the college porters. It was short-lived and only a few stamps exist. One on cover is known and is detailed in the Great Britain Philatelic Society Journal.

== Notable members ==
=== Politics ===
Magdalen College has taught members of several royal families. These include king Edward VIII, who attended while Prince of Wales from 1912 to 1914, after which he left without graduating; Jigme Khesar Namgyel Wangchuck, the king of Bhutan, who read for an MPhil in politics in 2000; and crown prince Al-Muhtadee Billah, first in line to the throne of Brunei, who enrolled in the Foreign Service Programme (now known as the Diplomatic Studies Programme) in 1995 under an assumed name.

==== Cardinal Wolsey ====
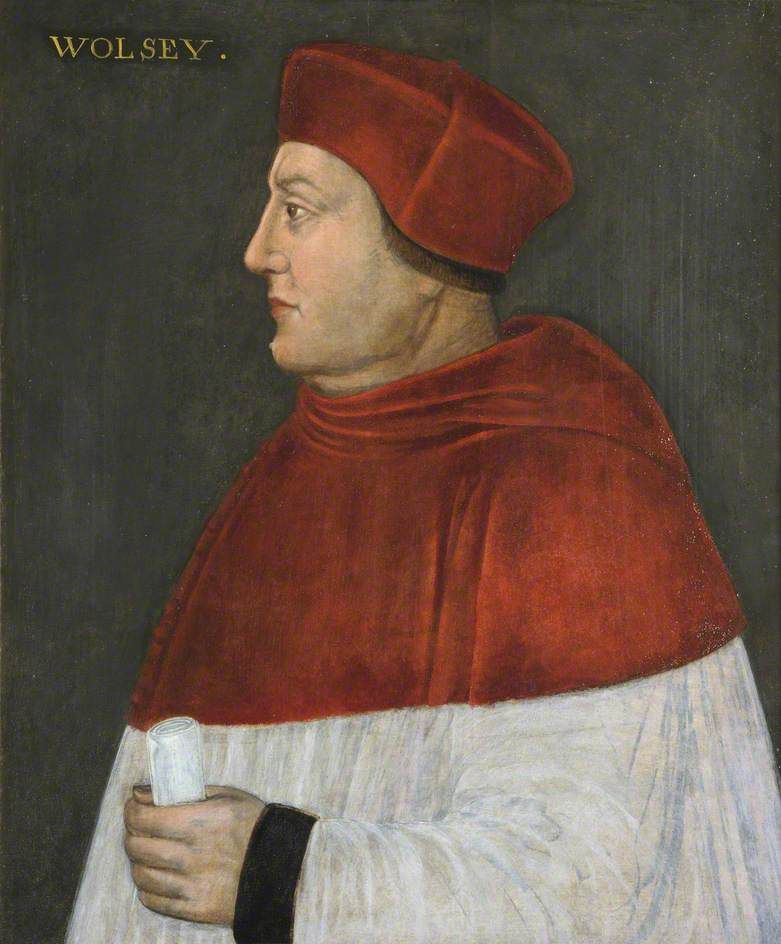
Portrait of Magdalen alumnus cardinal Thomas Wolsey

Among the political figures educated at Magdalen was Cardinal Thomas Wolsey, who studied theology. He graduated at 15, uncommonly early even for the time, but remained in Oxford for further study and eventually became a fellow of Magdalen. Wolsey rose from humble origins as the son of a butcher in Ipswich to become Lord Chancellor and the Archbishop of York, obtaining great political power and becoming adviser to Henry VIII.

Wolsey left a lasting legacy in Oxford by founding Cardinal College, which Henry VIII would refound as Christ Church after Wolsey's fall from power. He had also wished to create feeder foundations, most notably in his hometown of Ipswich. However, the combination of his fall and its subsequent loss of investment prevented these foundations from coming to fruition. Today, the only remnant of the original Cardinal College of Ipswich is Wolsey's Gate, which has been left in a vulnerable state since college land was granted to Thomas Alvard.

==== Other notable political alumni ====
More recent Magdalen alumni to become politicians include Malcolm Fraser, former prime minister of Australia, and John Turner, former prime minister of Canada. Many members of the UK Parliament have been alumni of Magdalen. In the current House of Commons sit alumni Alex Chalk, Jeremy Hunt and John Redwood. In the House of Lords sit alumni William Hague, Baron Hague of Richmond, former leader of the Conservative Party; David Lipsey, Baron Lipsey; Dido Harding, Baroness Harding of Winscombe; John Hutton, Baron Hutton of Furness; Michael Jay, Baron Jay of Ewelme; Matt Ridley, 5th Viscount Ridley; and Stewart Wood, Baron Wood of Anfield, former tutorial fellow.

The political success of Magdalen alumni was notable in 2010, when 5 out of the 22 ministers in the cabinet had attended Magdalen.

=== Arts ===
==== Literature ====
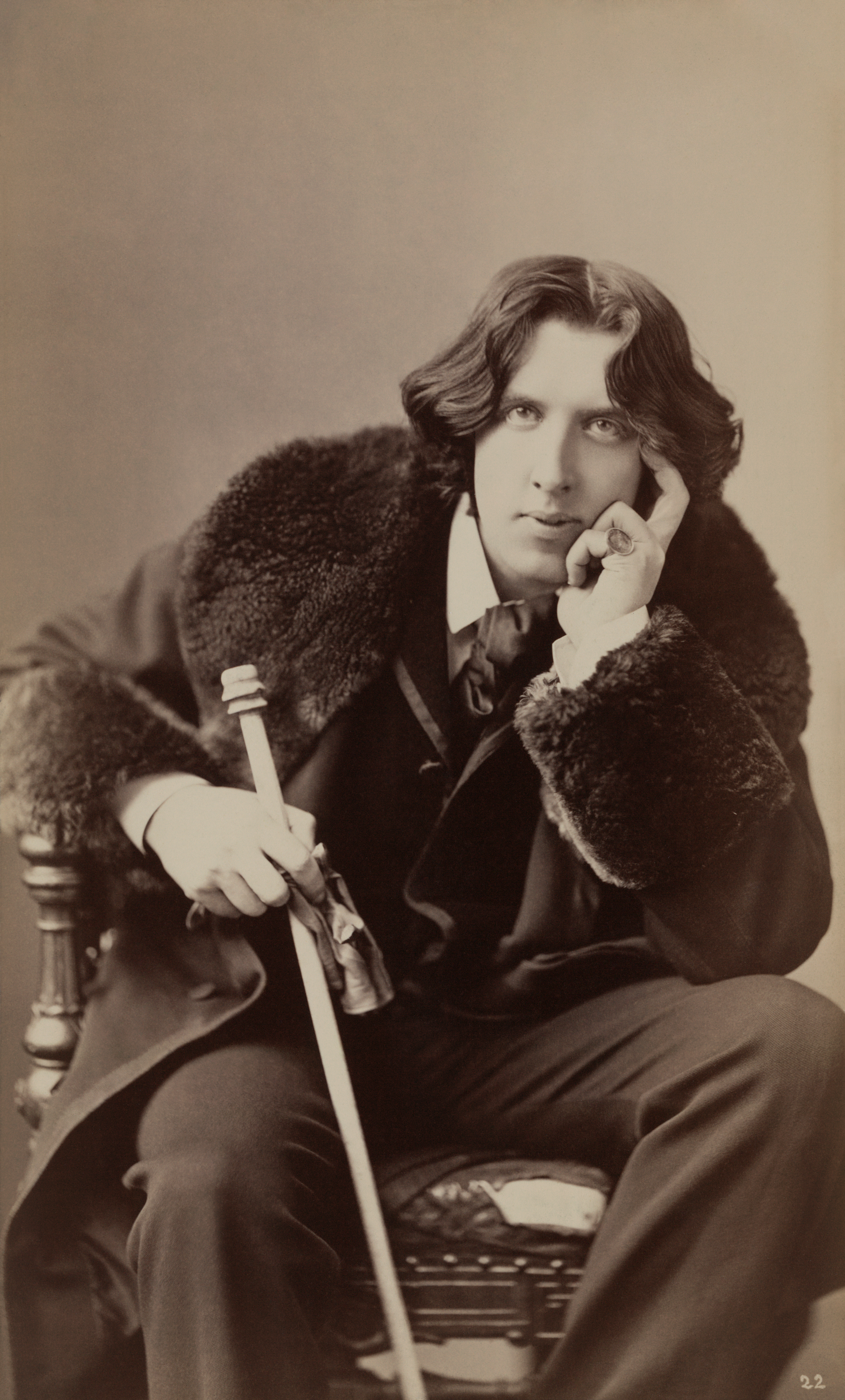
Oscar Wilde

Joseph Addison, for whom Addison's walk is named, was a Fellow of Magdalen during the 17th century. He is known for his play Cato, a Tragedy based on the life of Cato the Younger at the end of the Roman Republic. Popular with the American Founding Fathers, the play may have served as a literary inspiration for the American Revolution.

The 19th-century poet, playwright, and aesthete Oscar Wilde read greats at Magdalen from 1874 to 1878. During this time, he won the university's Newdigate Prize and graduated with a double first. After his time at Magdalen, he became famous for his works including the novel The Picture of Dorian Gray and the play The Importance of Being Earnest.

Wilde began an affair in 1891 with Alfred Douglas, who was then himself a student at Magdalen. The disapproval of Douglas's father over Wilde's relationship with his son led to Wilde's prosecution and conviction in 1895 for "gross indecency", that is to say, homosexual behaviour, and a sentence to two years' hard labour. Wilde described "the two great turning-points in my life were when my father sent me to Oxford, and when society sent me to prison". After his release from prison, Wilde moved to France and spent the last three years of his life in poverty. He was posthumously pardoned in 2017 under Turing's Law.

The prolific author Compton Mackenzie, who wrote over one hundred novels, plays, and biographies, read modern history at Magdalen. He is known for his fiction, including Sinister Street—which features St. Mary's College, Oxford as a stand-in for Magdalen—and Monarch of the Glen. Compton Mackenzie co-founded the Scottish National Party and was knighted in 1952.

C. S. Lewis, writer and alumnus of University College, was a fellow and English tutor at Magdalen for 29 years, from 1925 to 1954. Lewis was one of the Inklings, an informal writing society that also included J. R. R. Tolkien and would meet in Lewis's rooms at Magdalen. Under Lewis's tutelage was the future Poet Laureate John Betjeman. Though Betjeman failed the maths portion of the entrance exams, he was offered a place to read English on the strength of his poetry, which had impressed the President of Magdalen and former Professor of Poetry Thomas Herbert Warren. Lewis and Betjeman had a difficult relationship and Betjeman struggled academically. Betjeman left having failed to obtain a degree in 1928, but was made a doctor of letters by the university in 1974.

Seamus Heaney, who received the Nobel Prize in Literature in 1995, was a fellow of Magdalen from 1989 to 1994.

==== Theatre ====
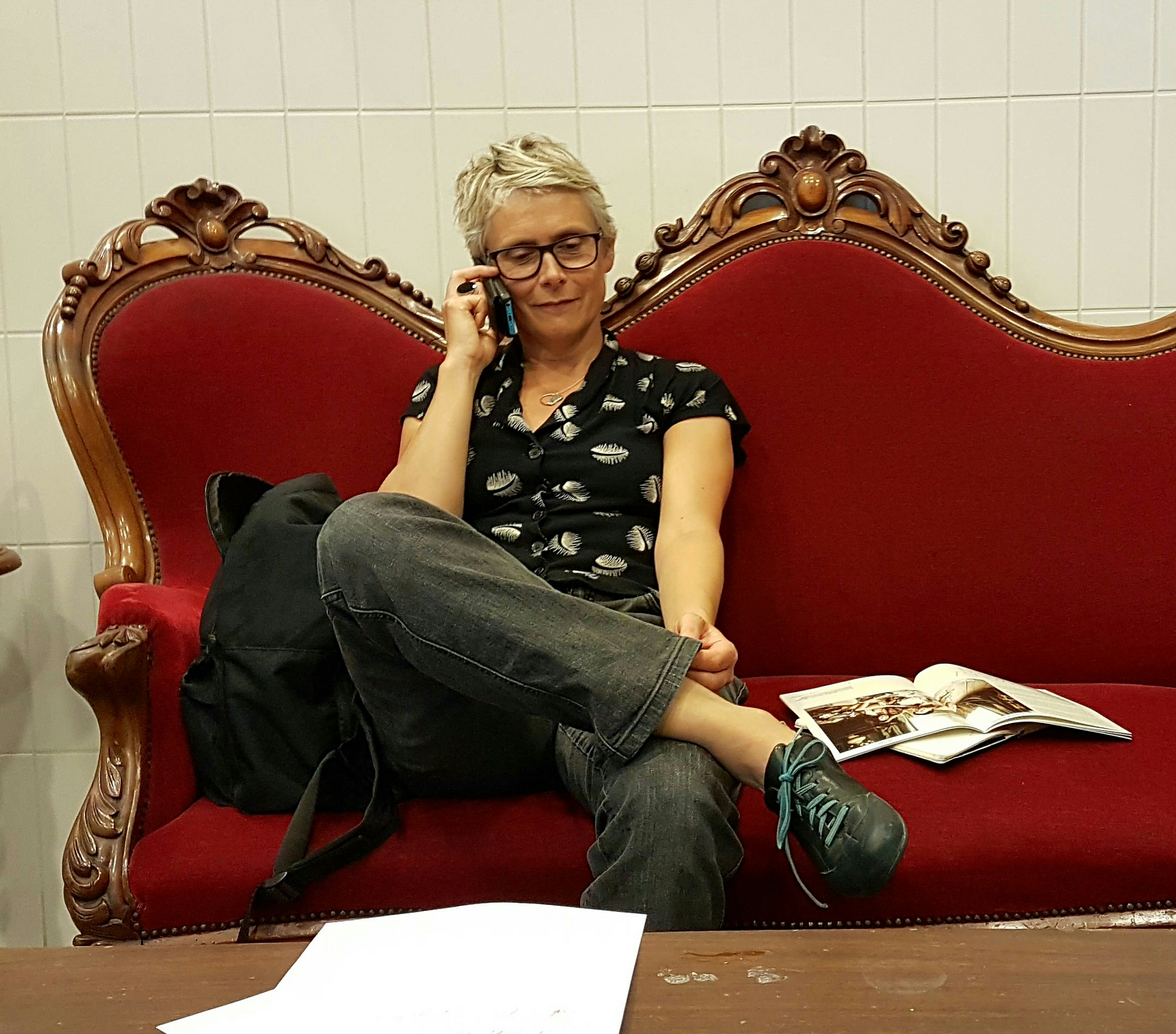
Director Katie Mitchell

The director Peter Brook is both an alumnus and an honorary fellow of Magdalen. He was described in 2008 as "our greatest living theatre director". Fellow director Katie Mitchell read English at Magdalen, and is known for her collaborations with Martin Crimp. In 2017, she received the President's Medal of the British Academy for her work in contemporary theatre and opera, and she has been described as British theatre's "king in exile".

==== Music ====
In 1957, the organist and composer Bernard Rose was appointed Magdalen's Informator Choristarum, choir master. Among his students were Harry Christophers, a composer and an artistic director for the Handel and Haydn Society who was an academical clerk and later honorary Fellow at Magdalen; and Dudley Moore, comedic actor and jazz musician, who studied at Magdalen on an organ scholarship.

Andrew Lloyd Webber, Baron Lloyd-Webber, composer of musicals including Evita and The Phantom of the Opera, studied history at Magdalen for a term in 1965, before dropping out to pursue music at the Royal College of Music. Andrew Lloyd Webber has received a number of awards for his work, including a lifetime achievement Tony Award.

=== Humanities ===
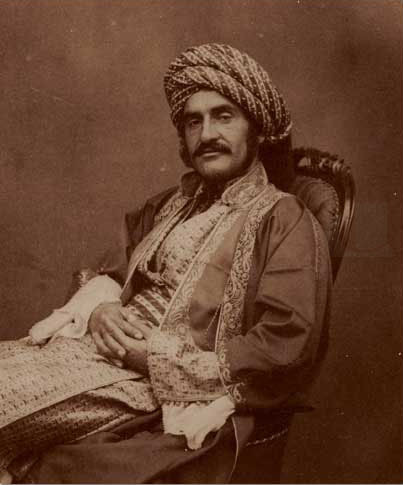
Hormuzd Rassam

Hormuzd Rassam, the native Assyriologist, studied at Magdalen for 18 months while accompanying archaeologist Austen Henry Layard on his first and second expeditions. When Layard retired from archaeology, the British Museum appointed Rassam to continue on his own. Rassam made several important discoveries: in 1853 at Nineveh, Rassam discovered the clay tablets that contained the Epic of Gilgamesh; in 1879 he discovered the Cyrus Cylinder in the ruins of Babylon; and in 1880–1881 he uncovered the city of Sippar. He was the first Middle Eastern archaeologist, but his contributions were dismissed by some of his contemporaries and by the end of his life, his name had been removed from plaques and visitor guides at the British Museum. Layard would describe him as "one whose services have never been acknowledged".

The economist A. Michael Spence attended Magdalen on a Rhodes Scholarship, and graduated with a BA in mathematics in 1968. In 2001, he shared the Nobel Memorial Prize in Economic Sciences for his work on "analyses of markets with asymmetric information". He is an honorary fellow at Magdalen.

Novelist and Spanish anti-fascist Ralph Winston Fox studied modern languages at Magdalen College, where he graduated in 1922 with a first-class honours. Fox was best known for being the biographer of both Genghis Khan and Vladimir Lenin, and for being killed while fighting against Hitler backed fascists during the Spanish Civil War.

Philosopher A. C. Grayling read for his DPhil at Magdalen, completing his studies in 1981. In 2011, he founded the New College of the Humanities. An analytic philosopher, Grayling is known for his criticism of religion, including in his 2013 book The God Argument, and his arguments for voting reform, as in his 2017 book Democracy and Its Crises.

Niall Ferguson, a well-known historian, also studied at Magdalen. The British journalist Louis Theroux read modern history at Magdalen.

=== Sciences ===
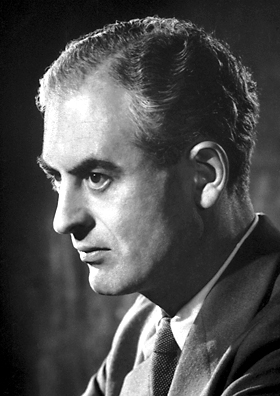
Peter Medawar, Nobel laureate and organ transplant pioneer

Magdalen counts among its alumni several recipients of the Nobel Prize in Physiology or Medicine. Howard Florey was an Australian pharmacologist who studied at Magdalen on a Rhodes Scholarship, graduating in 1924. He shared the Nobel Prize in Physiology or Medicine in 1945 for the development of penicillin. Peter Medawar read for a BA in zoology at Magdalen, receiving a first, and later for a DPhil, supervised by Florey. His research into tissue grafting and immune rejection led to the discovery of acquired immune tolerance and became the basis of organ transplantation. For this work, he shared the 1960 Nobel Prize in Physiology or Medicine.

Like Florey before him, Australian neurophysiologist John Eccles also came to Magdalen on a Rhodes Scholarship, where he read for his DPhil. He was taught by an earlier neurophysiologist who received the Nobel in 1932, Charles Scott Sherrington, who held the Waynflete Professorship in Physiology at Magdalen. In 1963 Eccles received the Nobel Prize in Physiology or Medicine for his research into synapses. Eccles was also known for his contributions to philosophy, writing on the mind-body problem and becoming an honorary member of the American Philosophical Society.

Peter J. Ratcliffe held the Nuffield Professorship of Clinical Medicine between 2003 and 2006, and is still a supernumerary fellow at Magdalen. He shared the 2019 Nobel Prize in Physiology or Medicine for his work on the oxygen sensing of cells. Other former Nuffield Professors of Clinical Medicine include Sir David Weatherall, who founded the Weatherall Institute of Molecular Medicine in 1989, and Sir John Bell, who is also an alumnus of the college. The current holder of the chair is Richard Cornall, who was appointed in 2019.

Two Fellows of Magdalen have been awarded the Nobel Prize in Physics: Erwin Schrödinger in 1933, while he was a fellow; and Anthony James Leggett KBE in 2003, who had been a Fellow from 1963 to 1967.

Due to Magdalen's close relationship with Oxford's Botanic Garden and as the home of the Sherardian Chair of Botany, Magdalen has been associated with many accomplished botanists. Historic Sherardian Professors include John Sibthorp, in whose name the Sibthorpian Professorship of Rural Economy, later known as the Sibthorpian Professorship of Plant Sciences, was founded; and Charles Daubeny, who also held the Aldrichian Chair of Chemistry and founded the Daubeny laboratory. The Sherardian Chair has been held since 2022, by Lars Østergaard, who studies how molecular signalling mechanisms evolve to affect plant development.

Likewise, many distinguished scientists have held Waynflete Professorships at Magdalen. These include the mathematician J. H. C. Whitehead, who held the Waynflete Professorship of Pure Mathematics between 1947 and 1960. During this time, he was also the president of the London Mathematical Society, which established the Whitehead and Senior Whitehead prizes in his honour. He is remembered for his fundamental contributions to topology. The chair was held from 1984 until he retired in 2006 by Daniel Quillen, who received the Fields Medal for his work in algebraic K-theory. It is currently held by Ben Green.

== Gallery ==
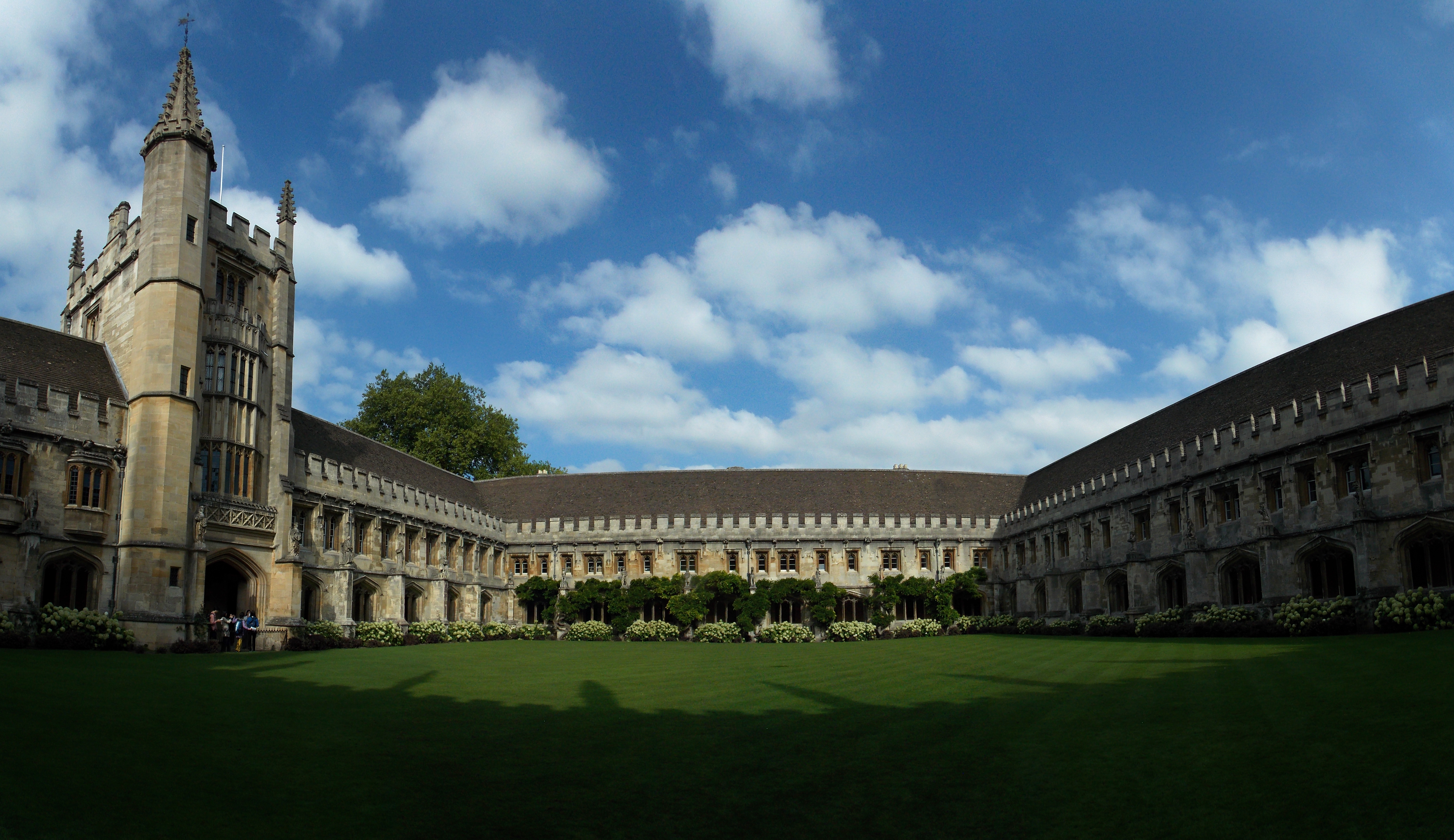
Panorama across the Cloister. On the left is the Founder's Tower.

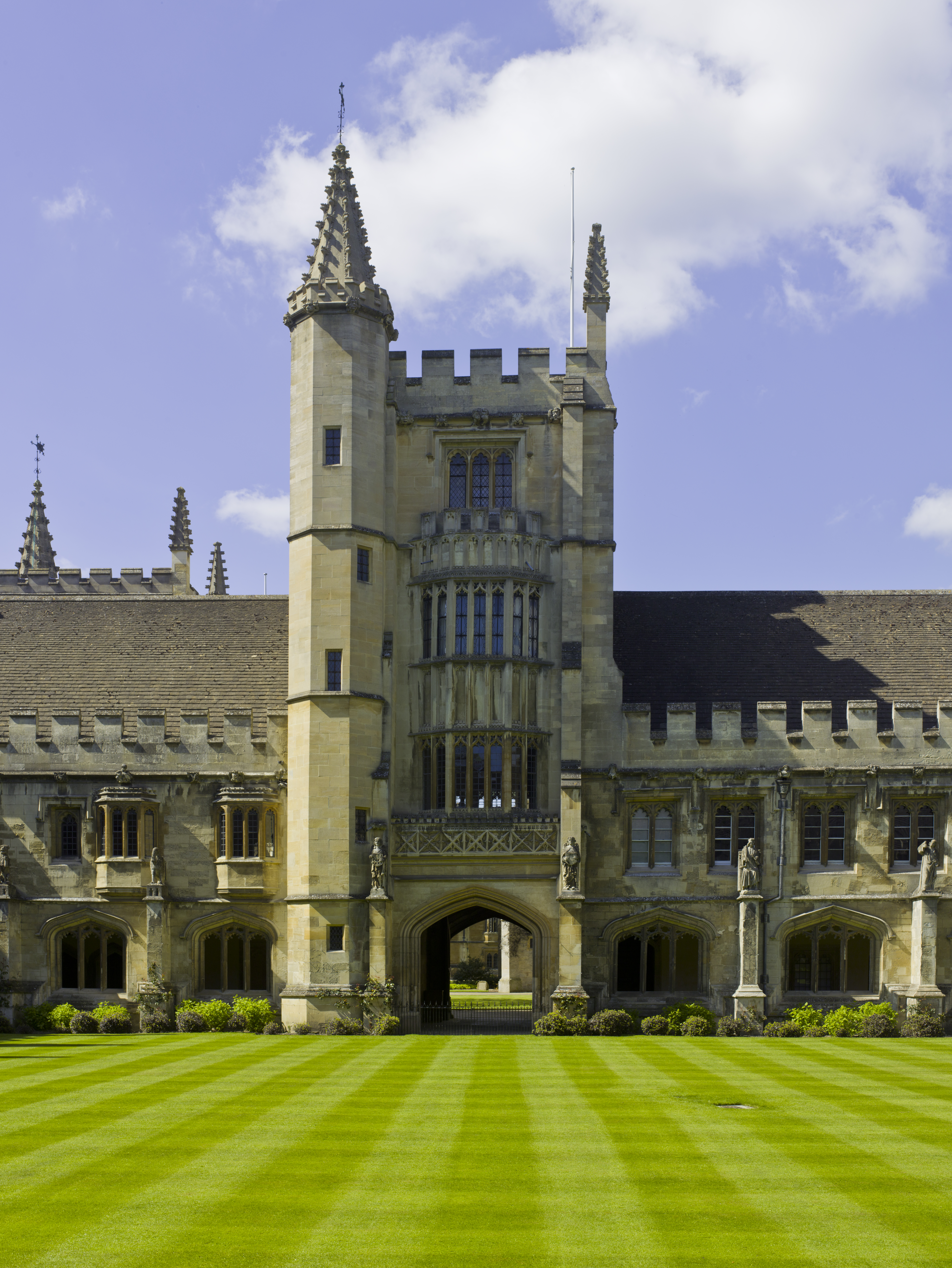
View of Founder's Tower from the Cloister

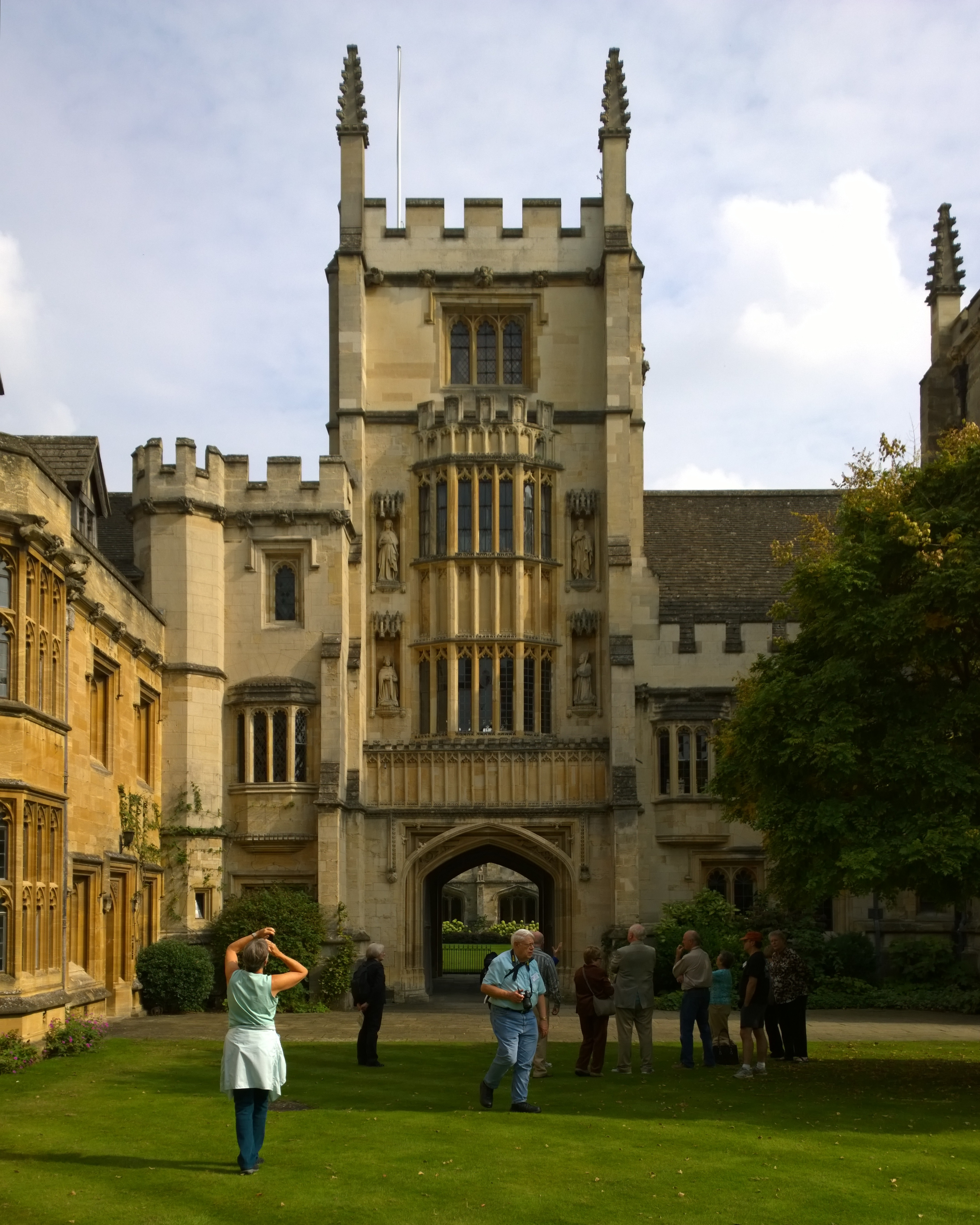
View of Founder's Tower from St. John's Quad

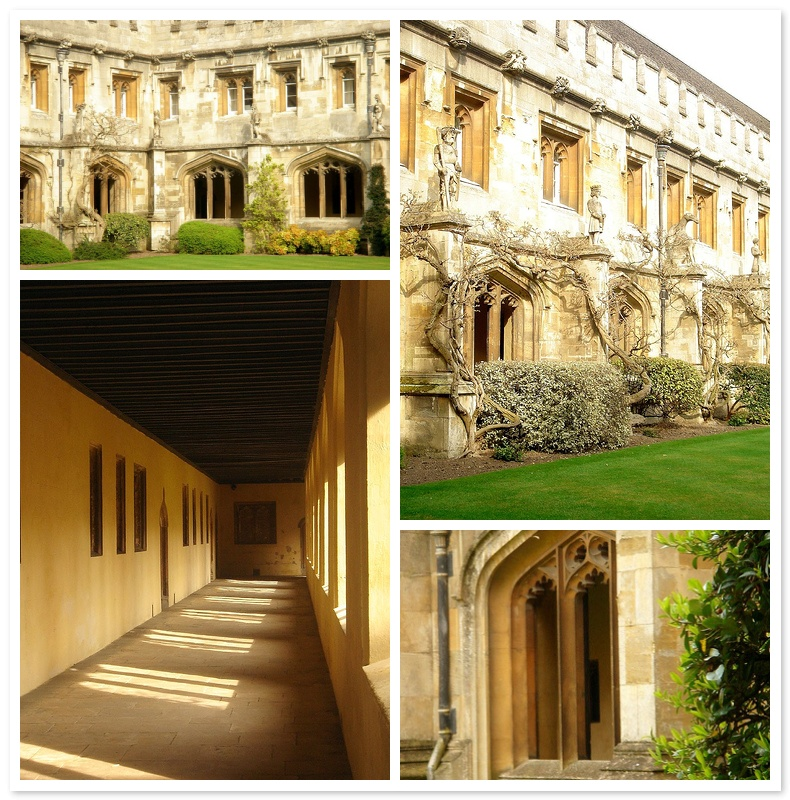
The Cloister

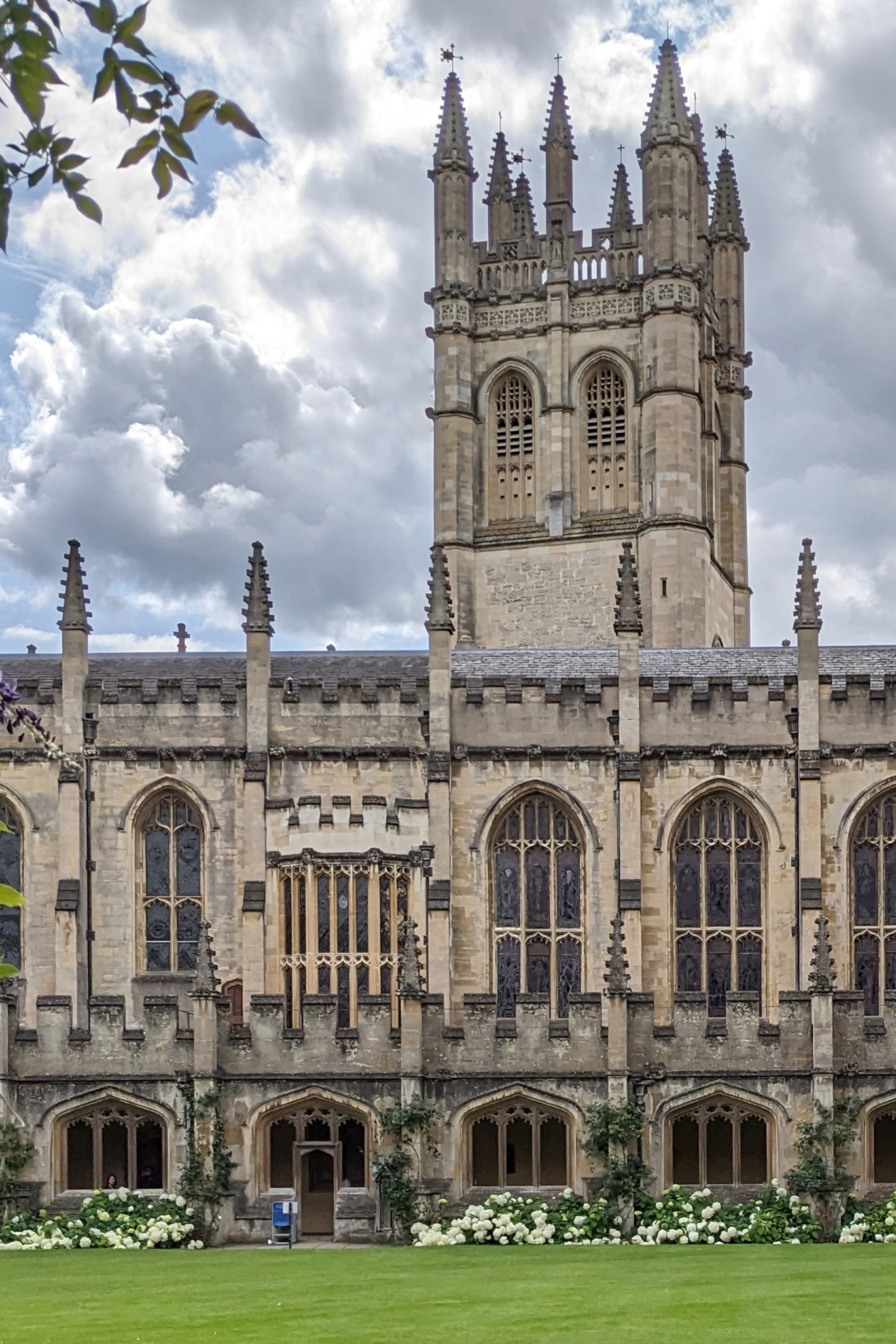
View of the Great Tower from the Cloister

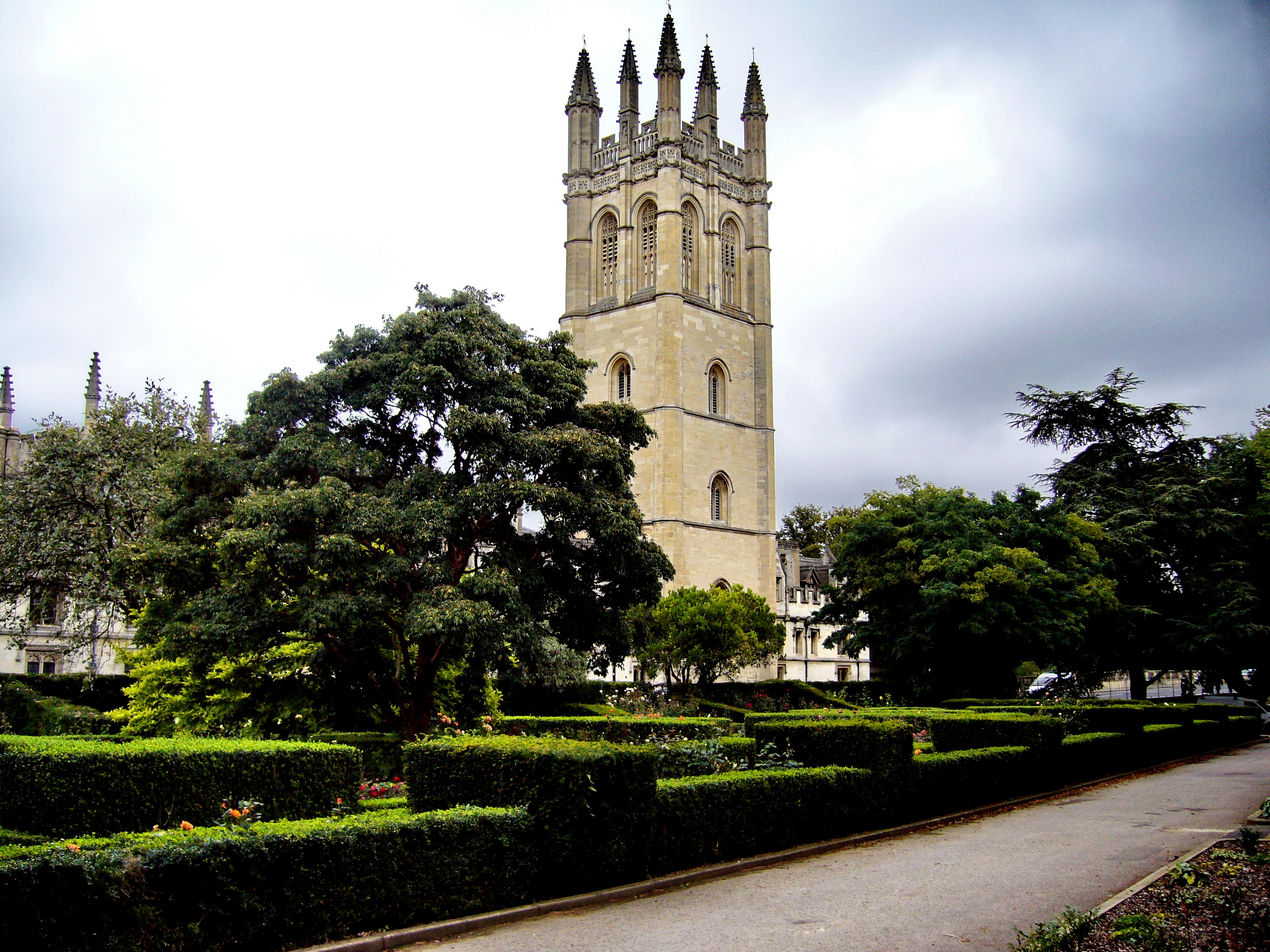
View of the Great Tower from the Daubeny Laboratory, across the High

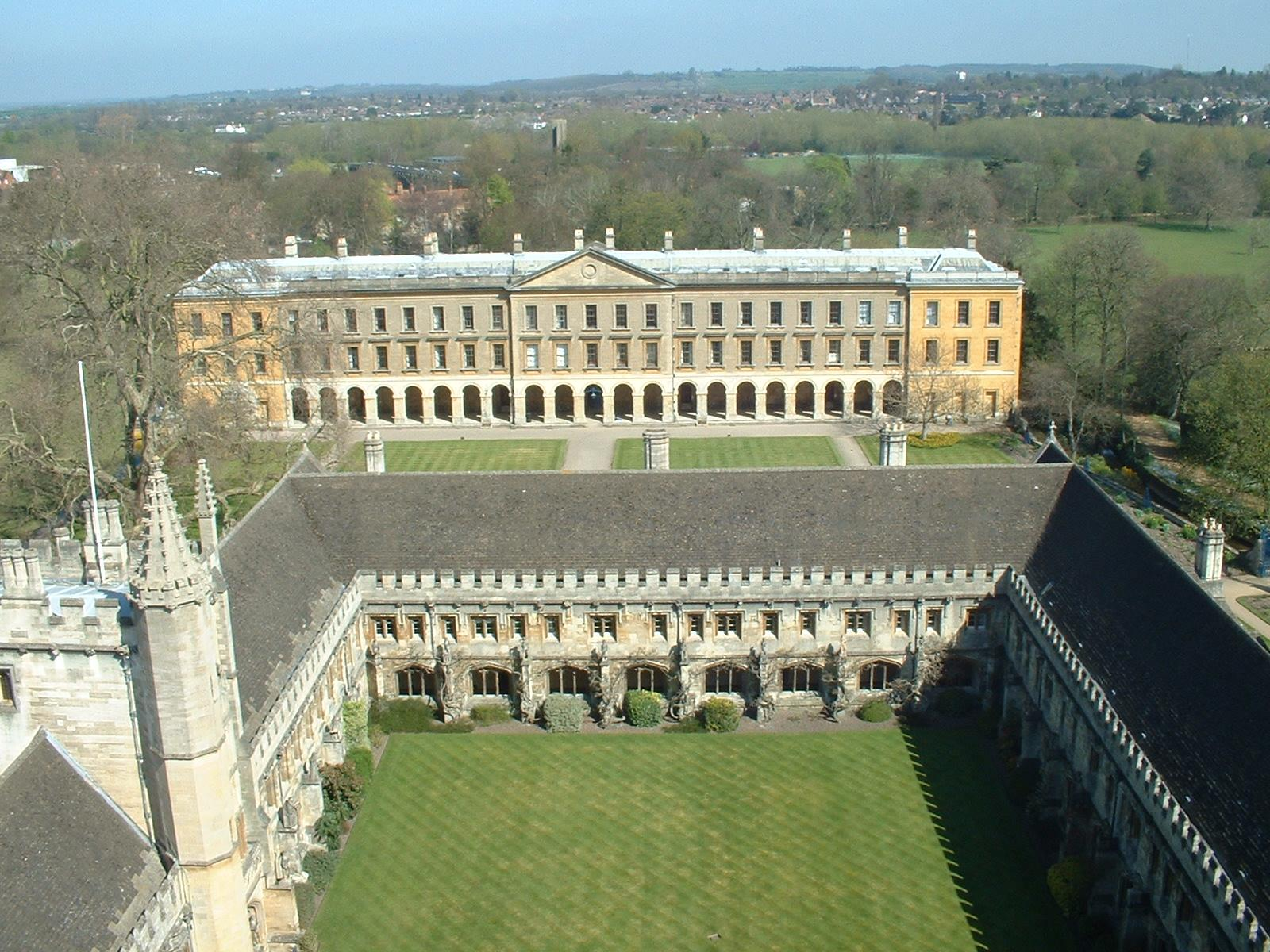
Position of the New Building and lawns behind the Cloister

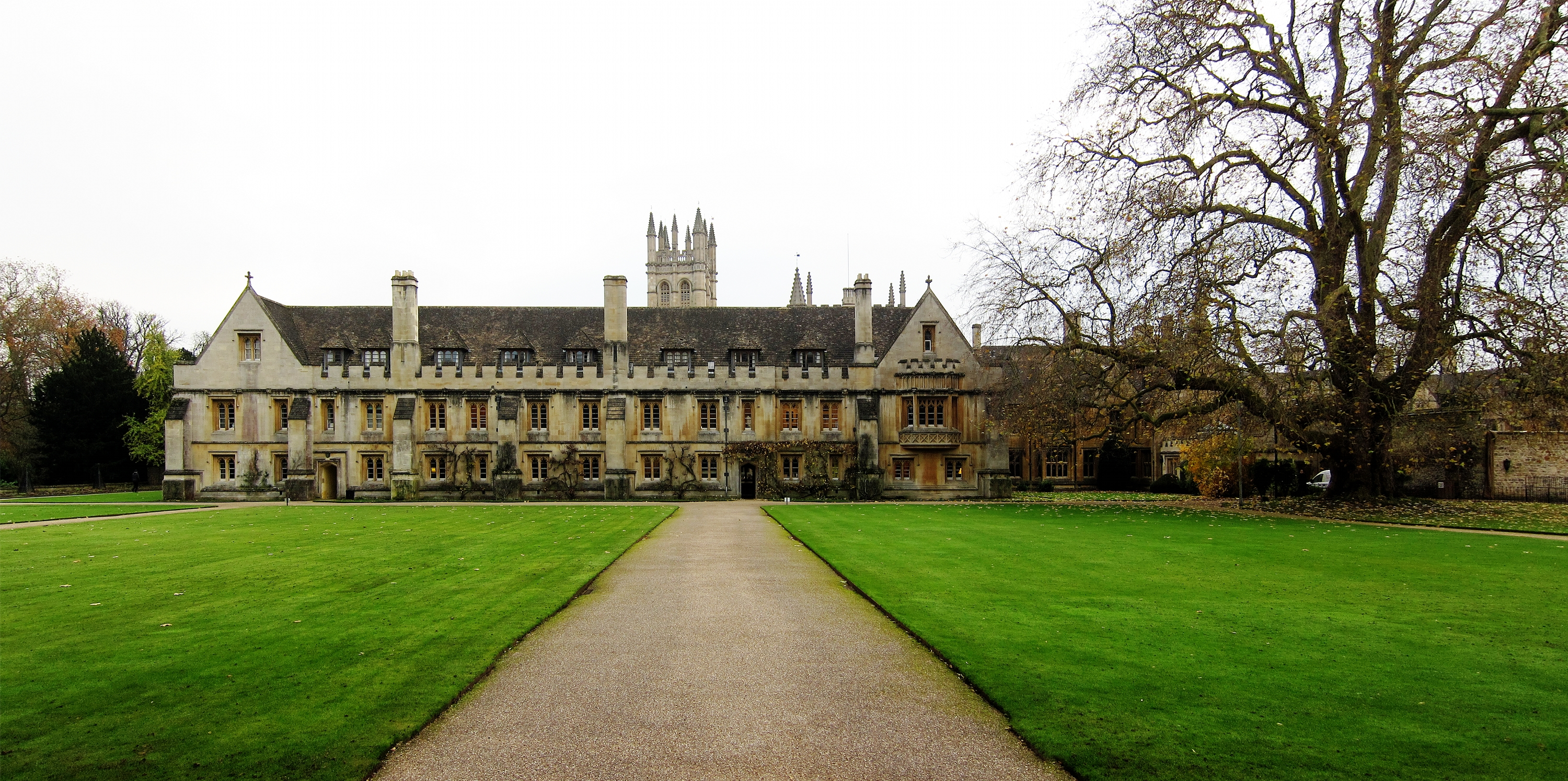
View of the Cloister and Great Tower from the New Building

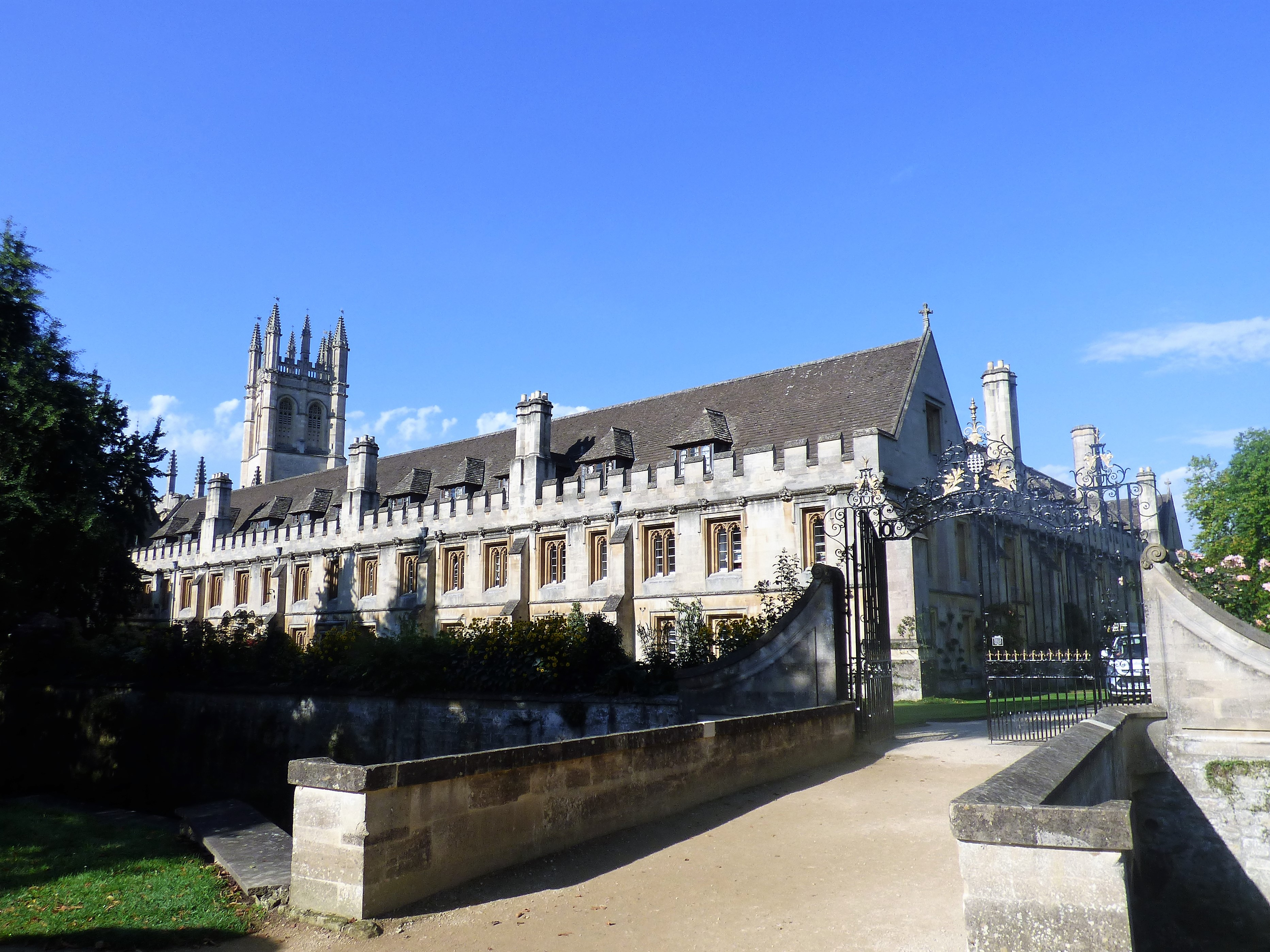
The Great Tower and cloister, viewed from Addison's Walk

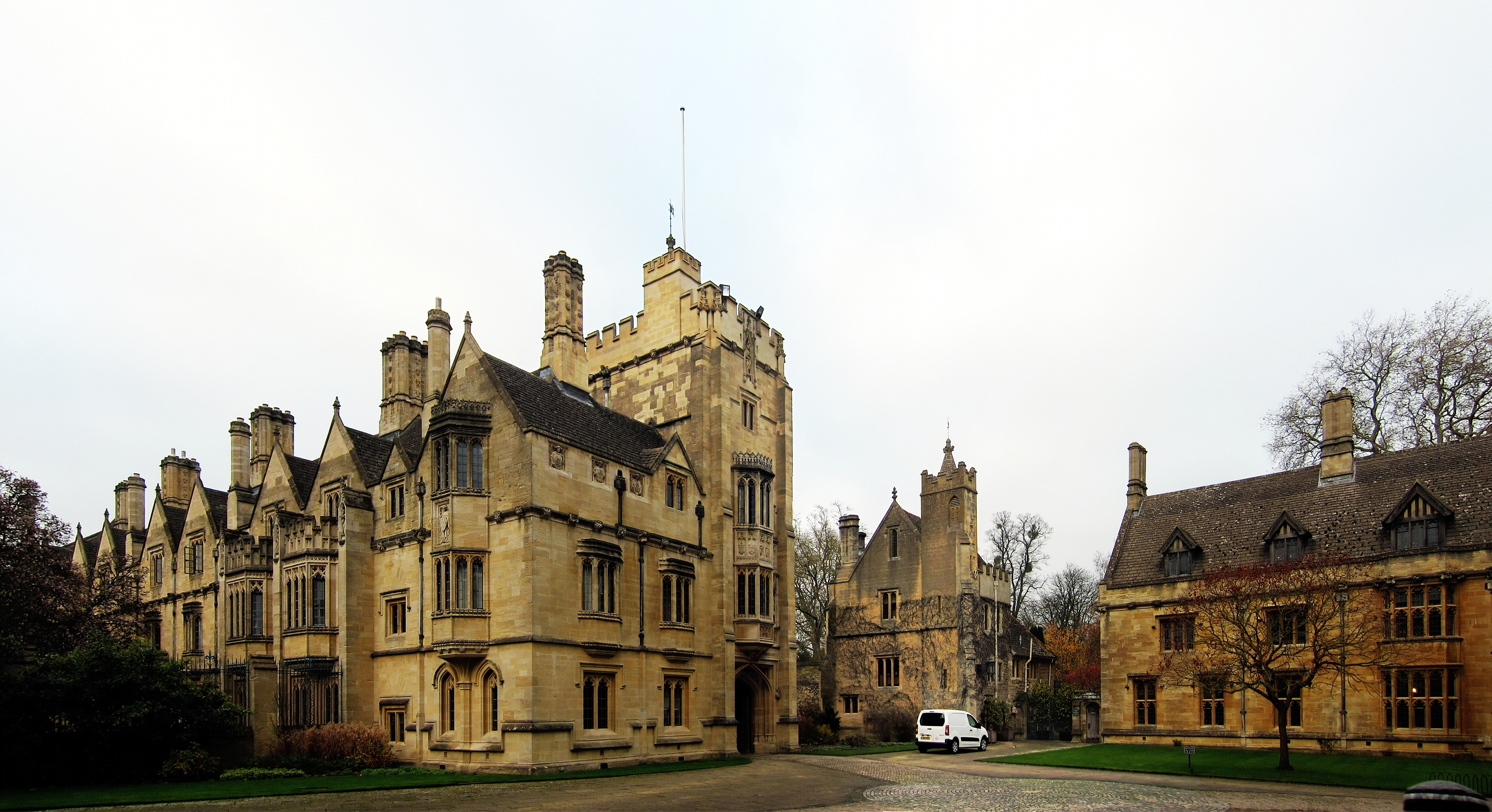
St. John's Quad, showing (left to right) the gate to St. Swithun's quad, the Grammar Hall, and the President's Lodgings

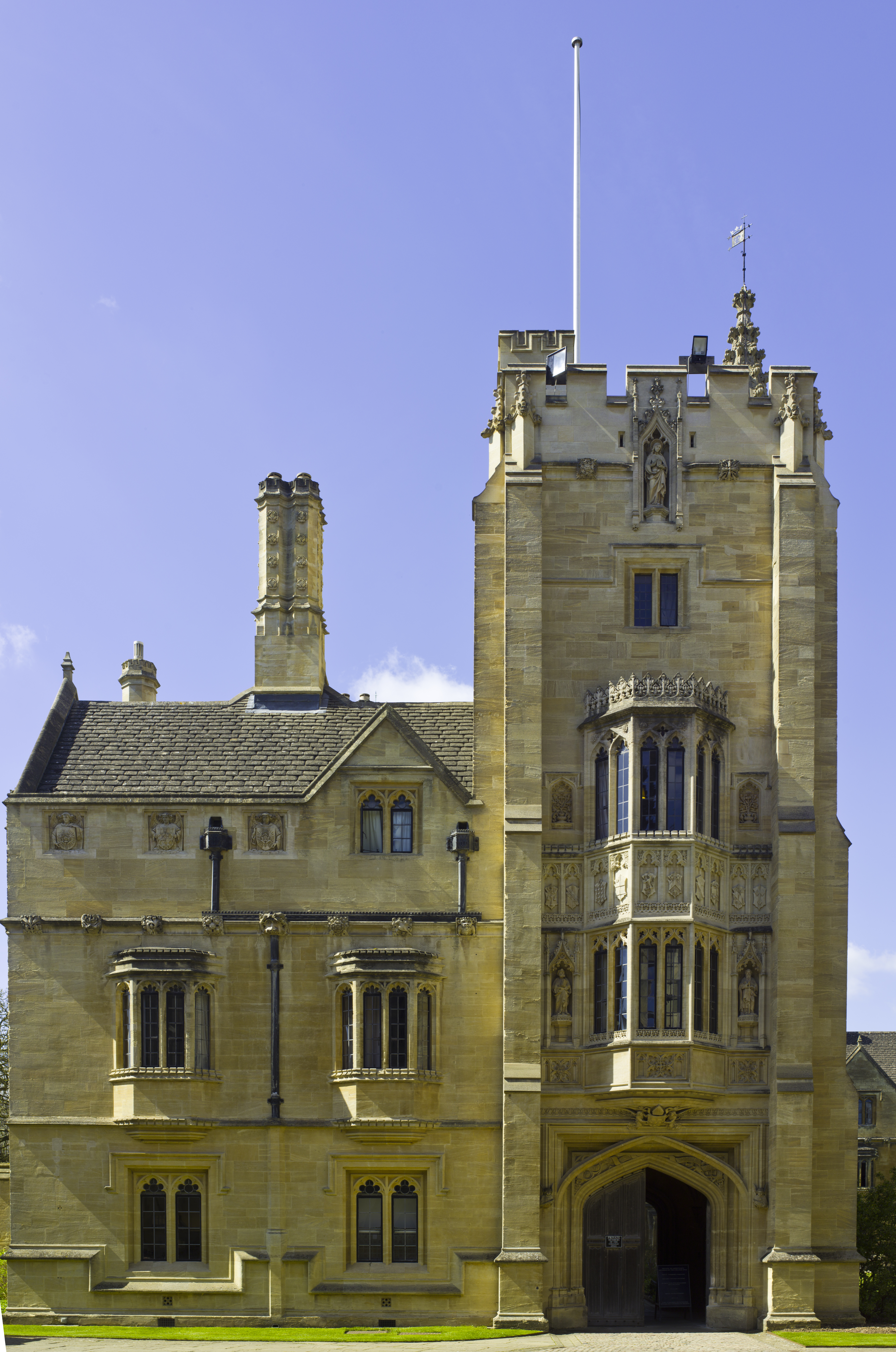
Gateway to St. Swithun's Quad (St. Swithun's Tower).

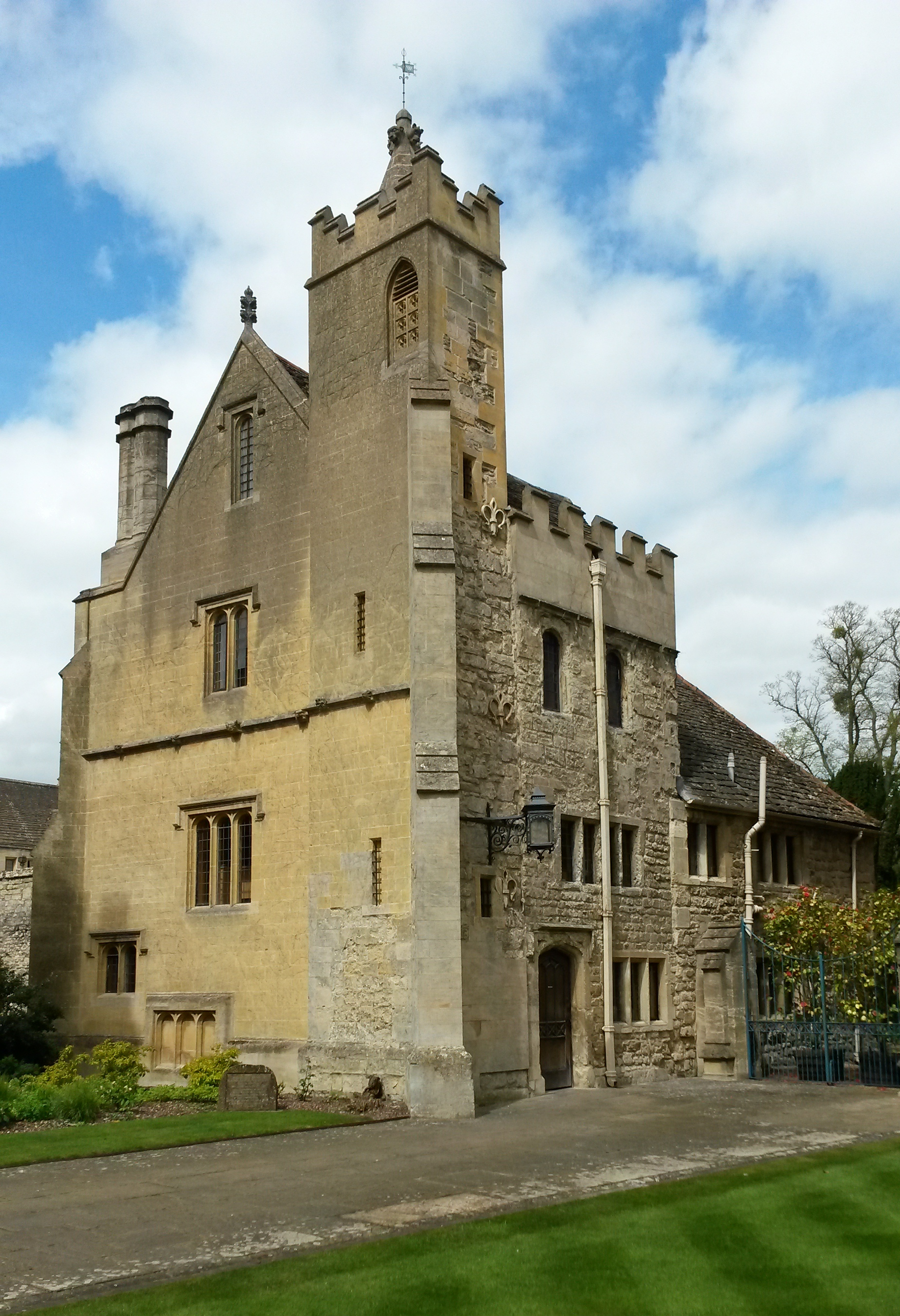
The old Grammar Hall

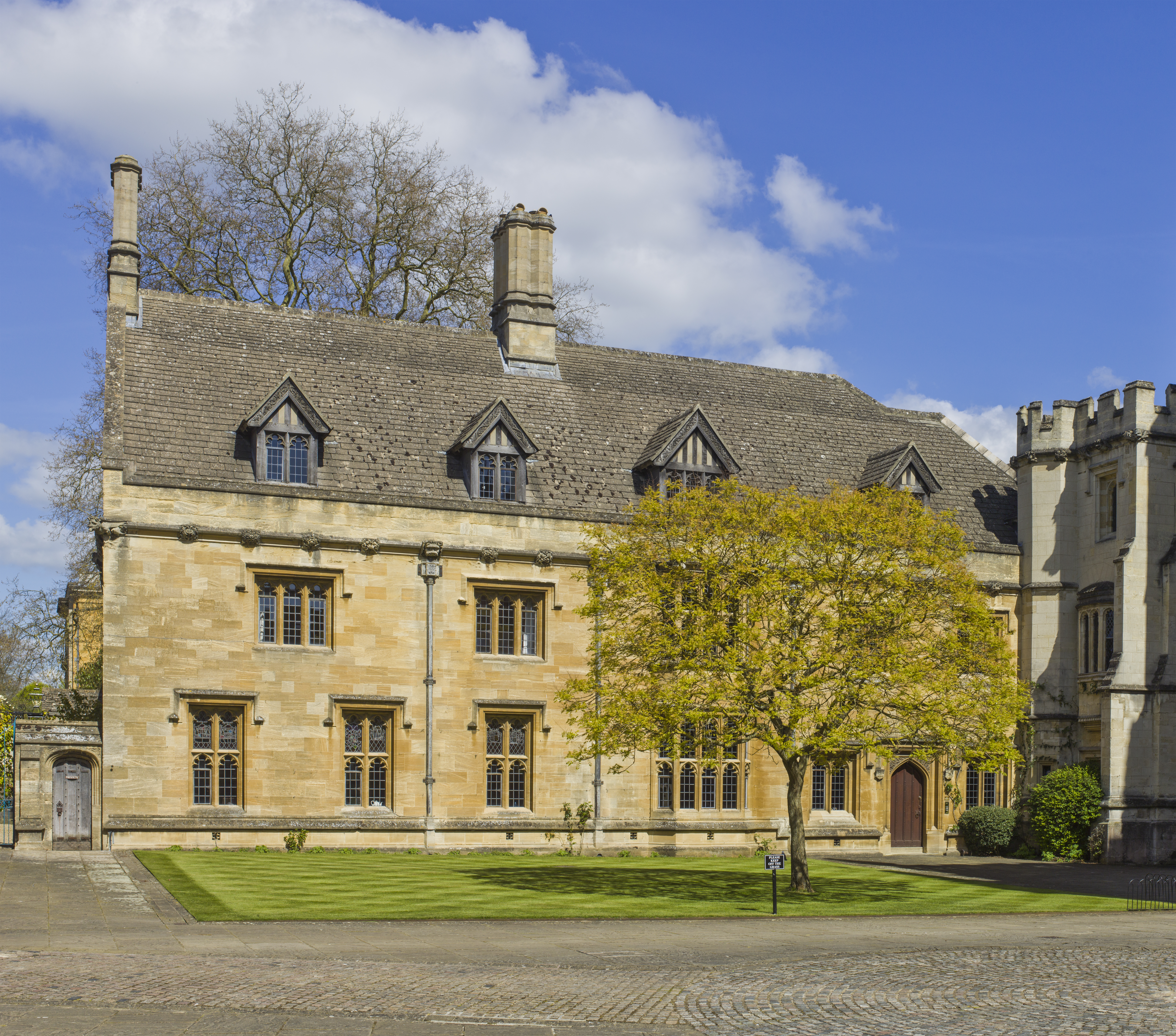
The President's Lodgings and Pride of India tree

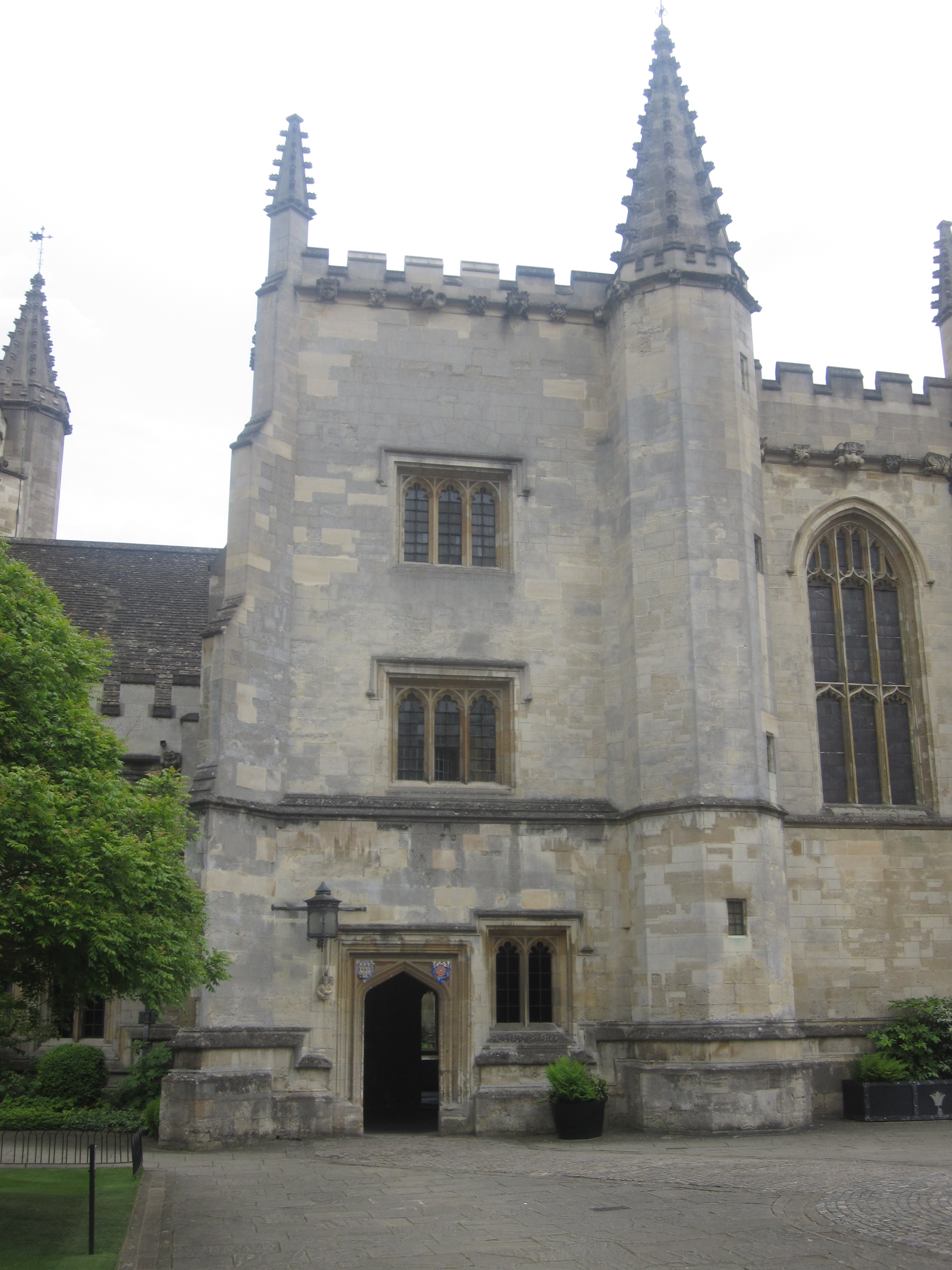
Muniment Tower

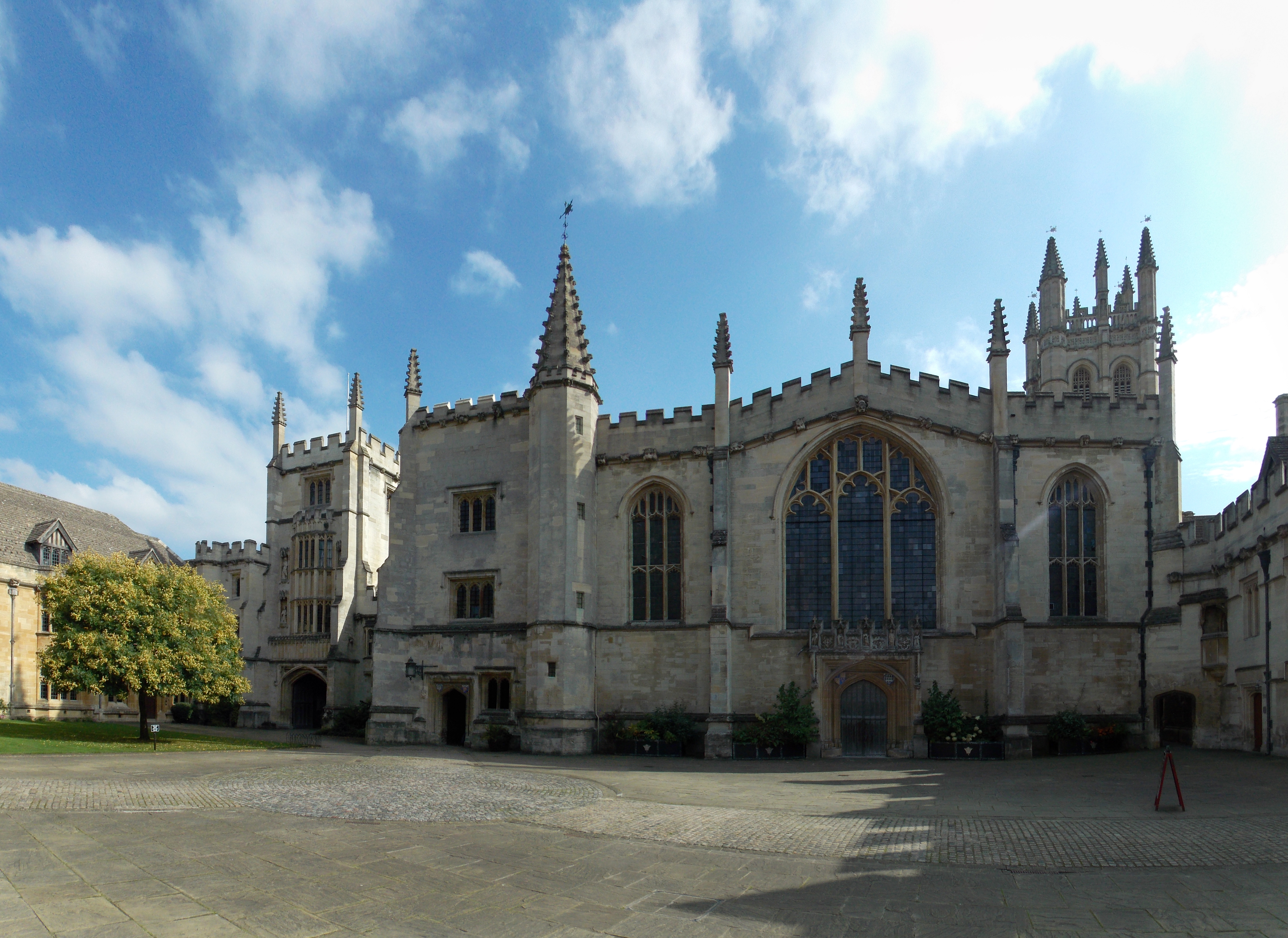
St. John's Quad, showing (left to right) the President's Lodgings, Founder's Tower, Muniment Tower, the chapel, and the Great Tower behind

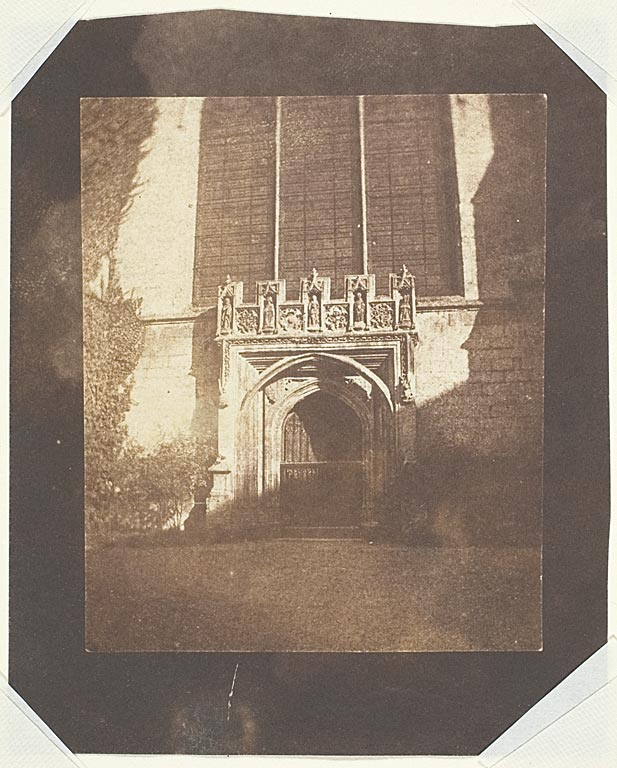
Ancient Door, Magdalen College, Oxford by Henry Fox Talbot, circa 1843, showing the western door to the chapel beneath the window depicting the Last Judgment

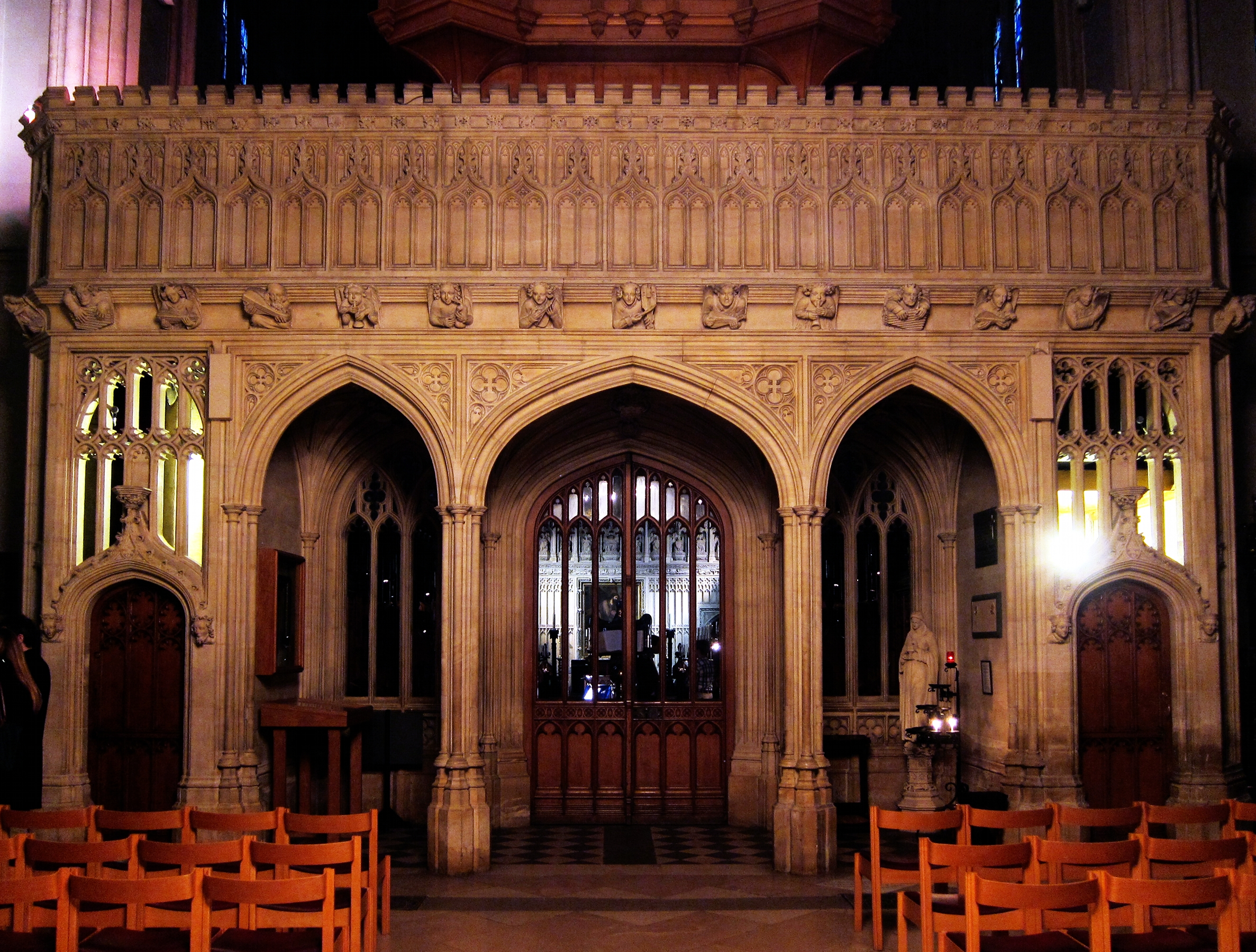
Interior of the chapel

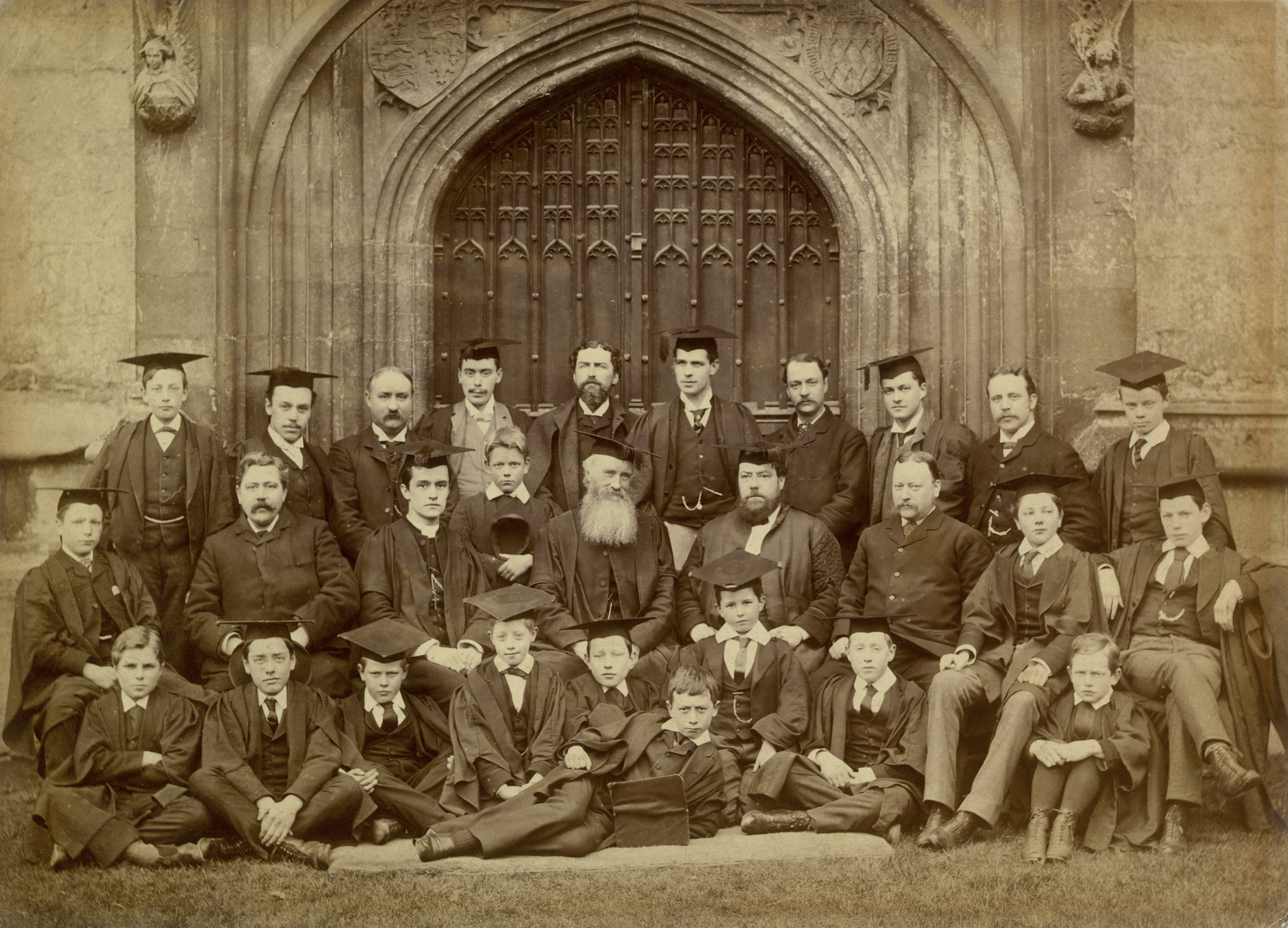
The choir of Magdalen College c. 1898

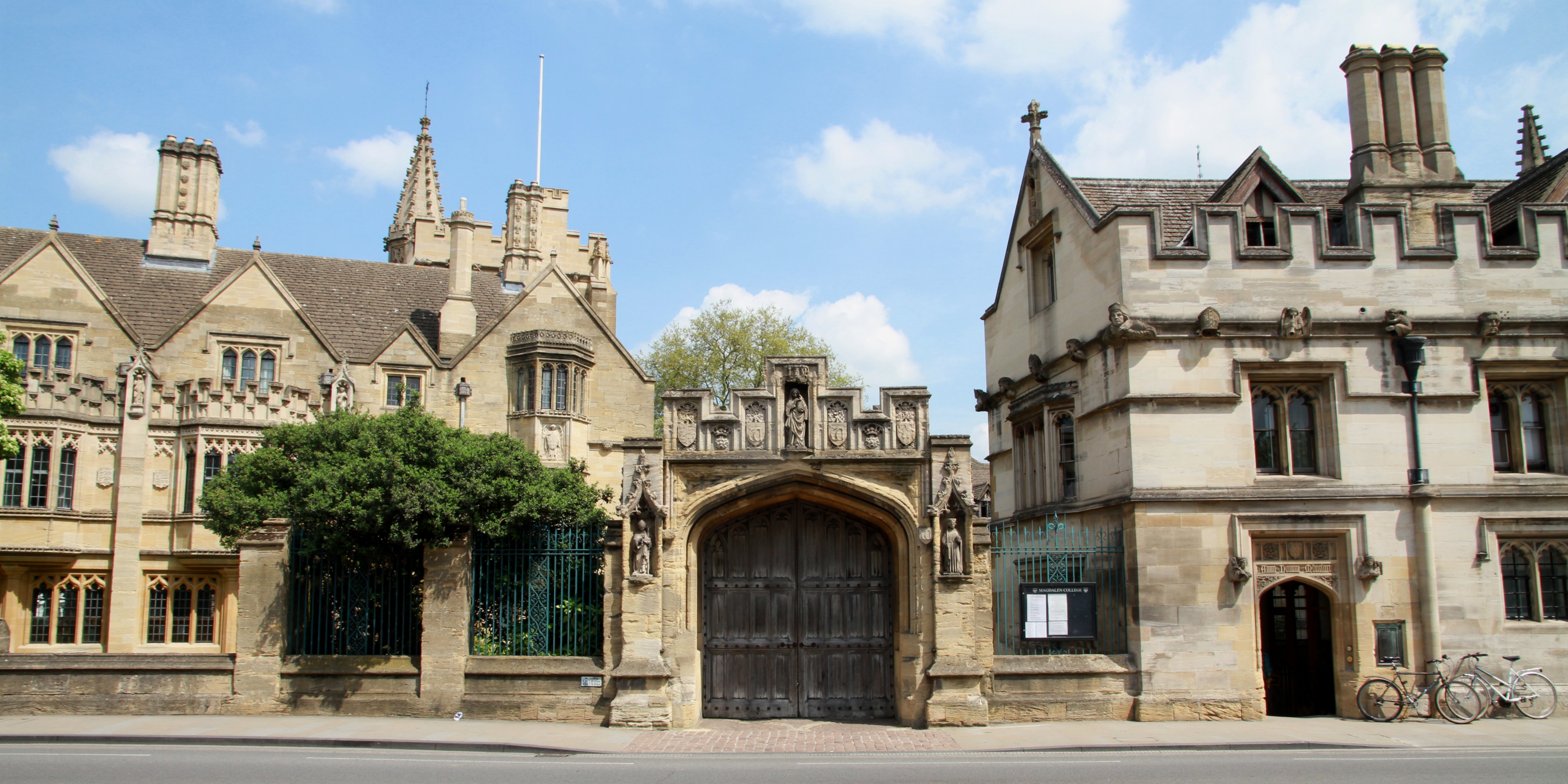
Gate between the High and St. John's Quad. The Porter's Lodge is on the right.

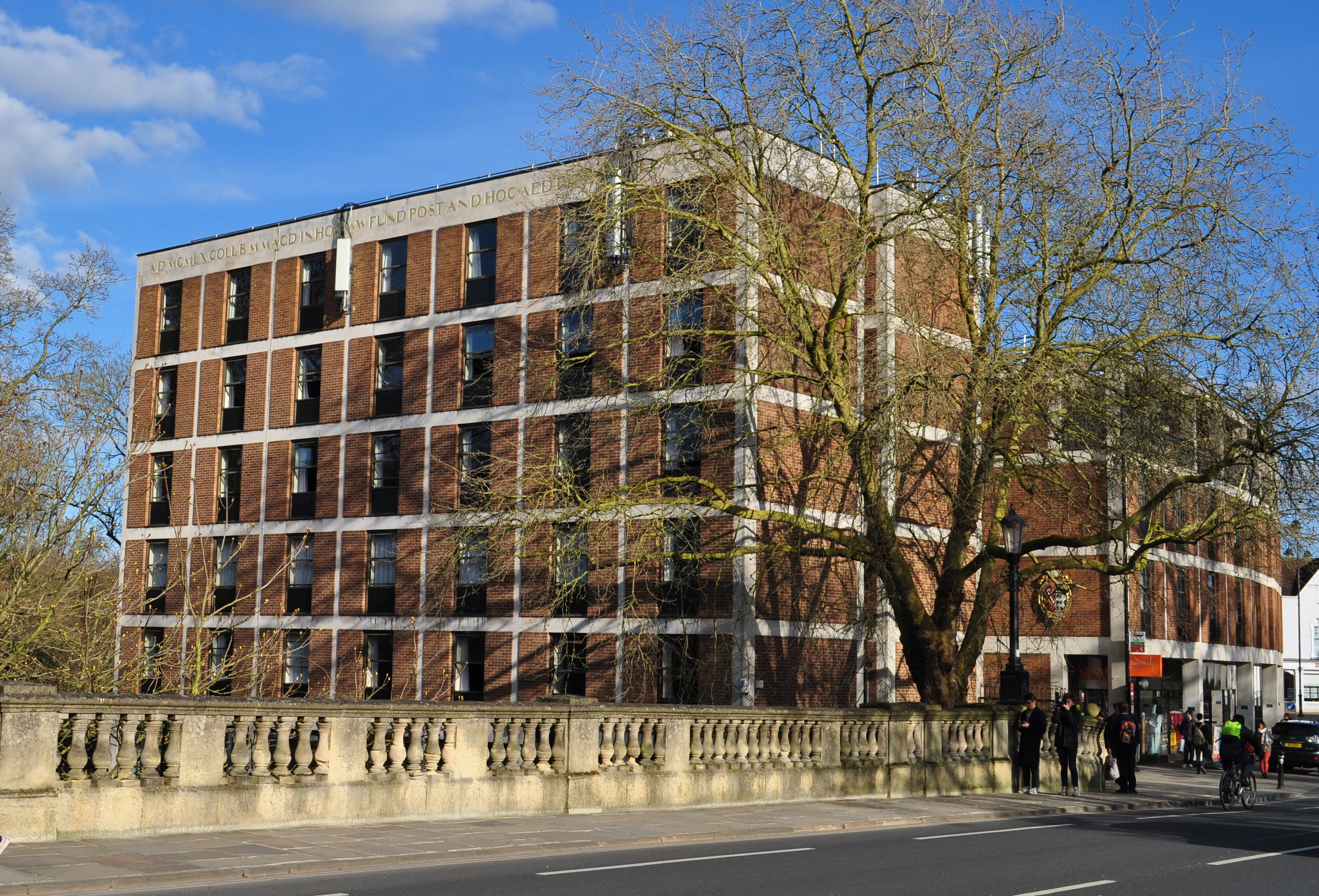
The Waynflete Building, on the east side of Magdalen Bridge

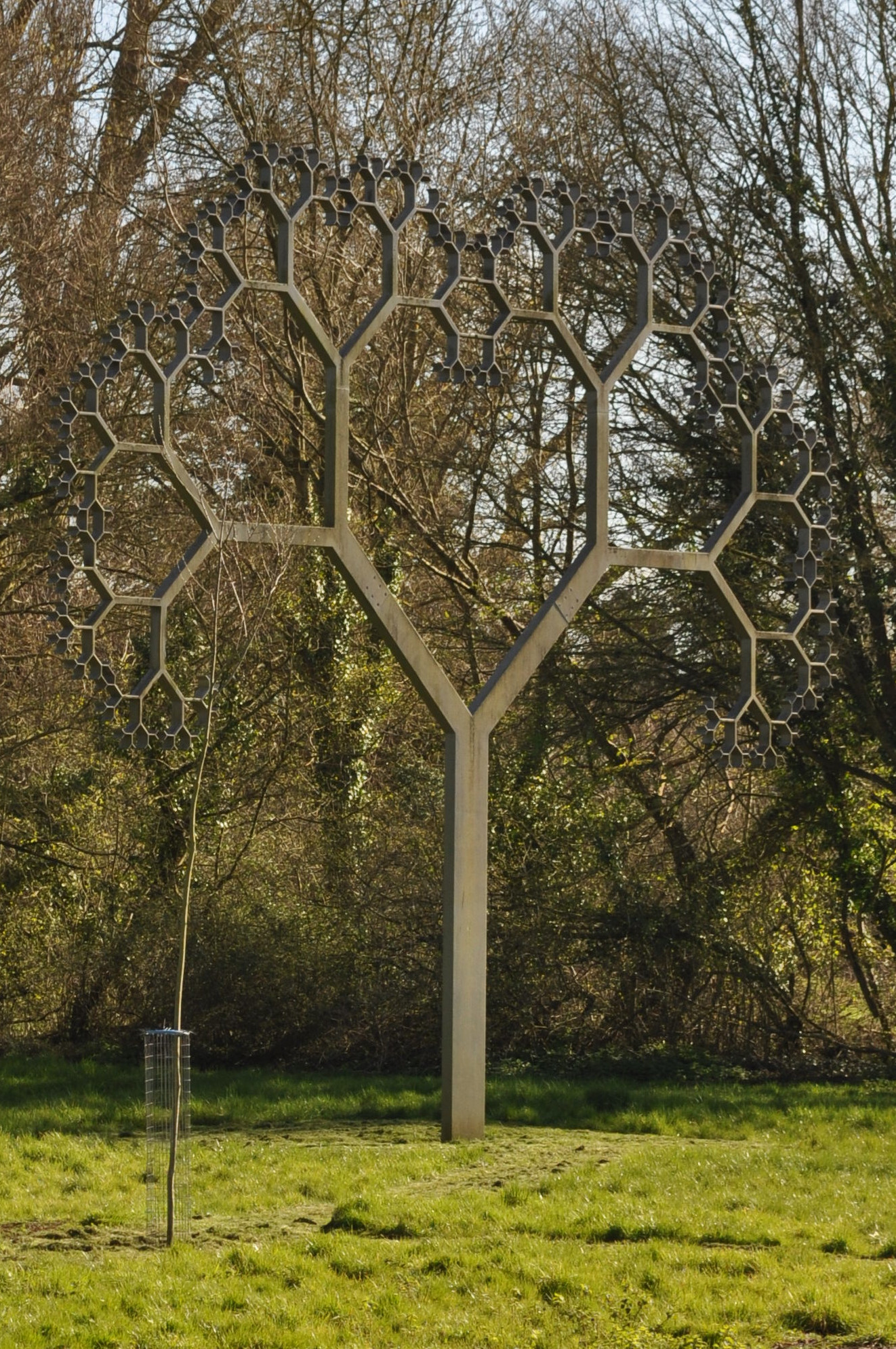
Y by Mark Wallinger in Bat Willow Meadow
