= John Varley Roberts =

English choirmaster, organist, and composer

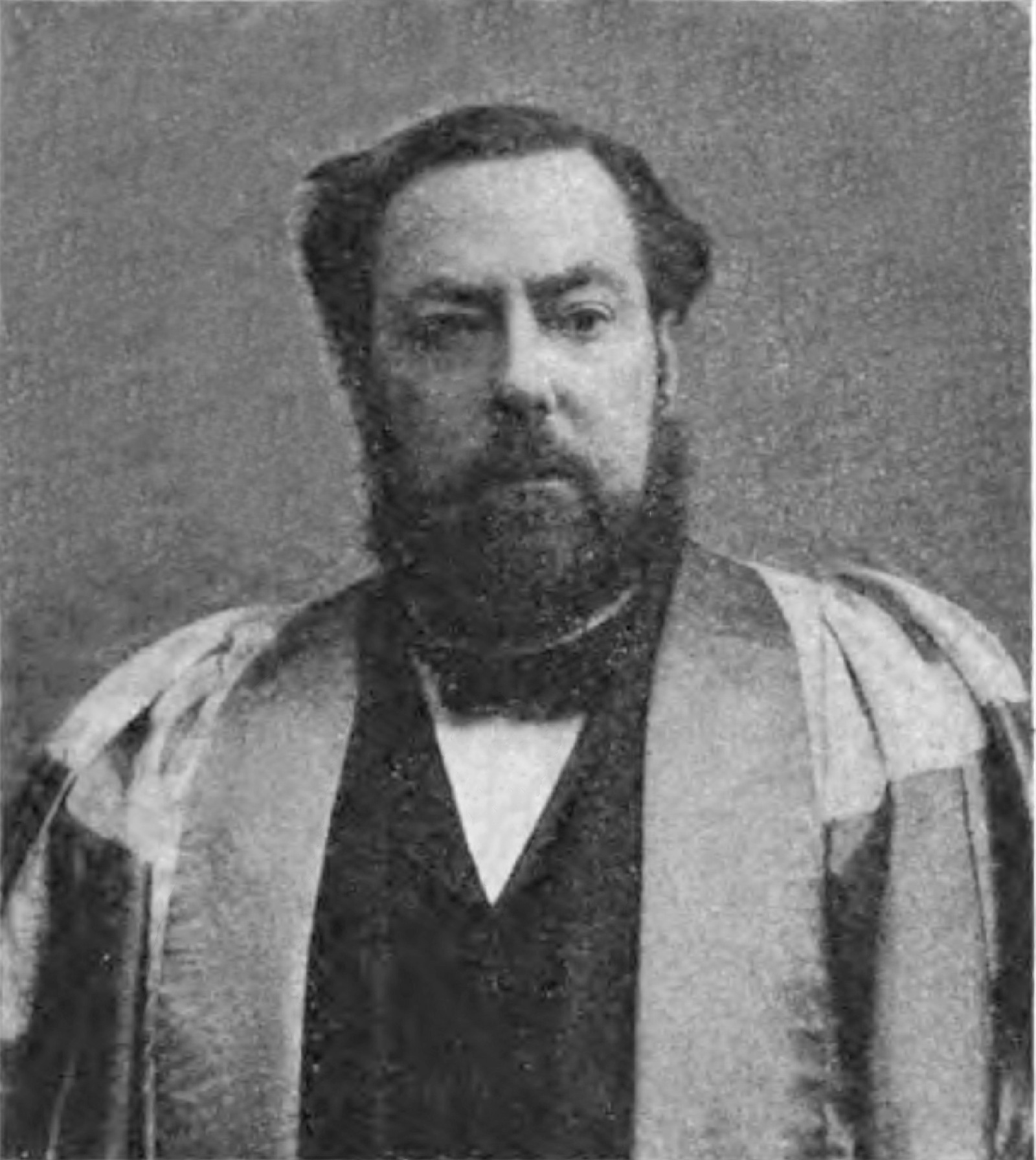
- John Varley Roberts in his DMus robes, possibly in the early 1880s.
- Born: 25 September 1841; Stanningley, West Riding of Yorkshire, England
- Died: 9 February 1920 (aged 78); Oxford, England
- Occupations: Choirmaster, organist, composer
- Spouse: Elizabeth Maning

John Varley Roberts (25 September 1841 – 9 February 1920) was an English choirmaster, organist, and composer. He spent most of his career at Magdalen College, Oxford.

== Life ==
=== Family and early years ===
John Varley Roberts was born on 25 September 1841 at Stanningley, near Leeds, the fourth son of Joseph Varley Roberts (1800–1881), and his wife Elizabeth. John Varley was baptised on 2 January 1842 at St Wilfred's, Calverley. He had at least seven siblings: Sarah Ann, Esther, Charlotte Elizabeth, Joseph, James, Frances Eliza and Charles Hartley Roberts. James Varley Roberts, of Poplar House, Stanningley, died 28 January 1915. Charlotte Elizabeth (born 27 March 1828) lived at the same house with James and his wife Elizabeth (died 9 June 1938) and her husband Mathew Ross a bricklayer. until her death on 1 February 1907. Ross died 31 December 1881. Foster's Alumni Oxonienses (Oxford: Parker, 1888) says that John Varley was the fourth son, though I have only been able to find evidence of three male offspring. Charles was the only child not to survive into adulthood. Joseph is described as a clothier, or maker and finisher of woollen cloth, the trade for which the Leeds district was famous until the middle of the twentieth century. The children were involved in what was in this period a family business, usually run from home with the offspring working either as spinners (the two young men, Joseph Varley junior and James) or as weavers or burlers (the young women).

By 1851, Joseph Varley Roberts was described as a farmer, with seven acres of land to his name. All but two of the children were still living at home. Three (two of the boys and one of the girls) had by this time become school teachers. One was still a "woollen cloth manufacturer". The family's local church was St Thomas's, Stanningley, to which John Varley Roberts later donated (and designed) the pipe organ – still in existence – in 1906. He studied "the piano and musical theory under Bird, also taking lessons from Whitley, a bandmaster, and John Burton, brother of the organist of the town".

=== Leeds and Halifax ===
At the age of 12, John Varley Roberts was appointed organist of nearby St John's, Farsley. He then went to study at the recently opened York and Ripon Diocesan Training College for Masters. In 1862, he became organist of St Bartholomew's, Armley. Varley Roberts was not the organist at St Bartholomew's Church that we know today, complete with its world-famous Schulze organ, but the predecessor building and instrument, though he would have been there when the plans for the new building, though not the organ, were well advanced. By this time, Roberts wished to marry Elizabeth Yates Jane Maning, daughter of the Vicar of Farsley. The Reverend Maning strongly disapproved, however. For a time, her father may have sent her away in an attempt to cool Roberts’ ardour and break up the relationship, but the couple later eloped together. They were married in May 1866 at Ilkley Parish Church by licence, with no member of her family signing the register. Elizabeth Varley Roberts died in July 1917. Their one child, Gertrude, was born in 1868. Varley Roberts gave his father's Rank or Profession as 'Gentleman' in the Marriage Register, though whether a 'Farmer of Seven Acres', formerly a Clothier, could really pass as a Gentleman in mid-nineteenth-century terms is a moot point.

Roberts moved to Halifax Parish Church in 1868. By 1871 at the latest he was living with his wife and daughter in the newly fashionable area of North Park at 86 King Cross Street, in a house large enough to require the services of a live-in servant, and was describing himself in that year's census as 'Professor of Music'. The family were still resident there ten years later. Interestingly, his next door neighbour in 1881, Thomas L Booth, also described himself as a 'Professor of Music'.

=== Oxford ===
In 1871, having matriculated at Christ Church, Oxford, he was awarded the external degree of BMus from the University (the usual way to gain a music degree at that time). He graduated DMus (Oxon) five years later (the minimum period allowed after receiving the Bachelor's degree) in 1876, the same year that he became a Fellow (honorary) of the College (later the Royal College) of Organists – the highest honour and qualification for an organist, then as now. The DMus was conferred upon him after a performance by the Halifax Parish Church choir of his cantata Jonah, with text by the Vicar of Hipperholme and Headmaster of Heath Grammar School, the Reverend Thomas Cox. Cox was also Lecturer at Halifax Parish Church, having been appointed by Archdeacon Musgrave in 1871. Sydney Morton was the bass soloist in the title role at the first performance with the Parish Church Choir. Morton was a Worsted Goods Manufacturer in Halifax.

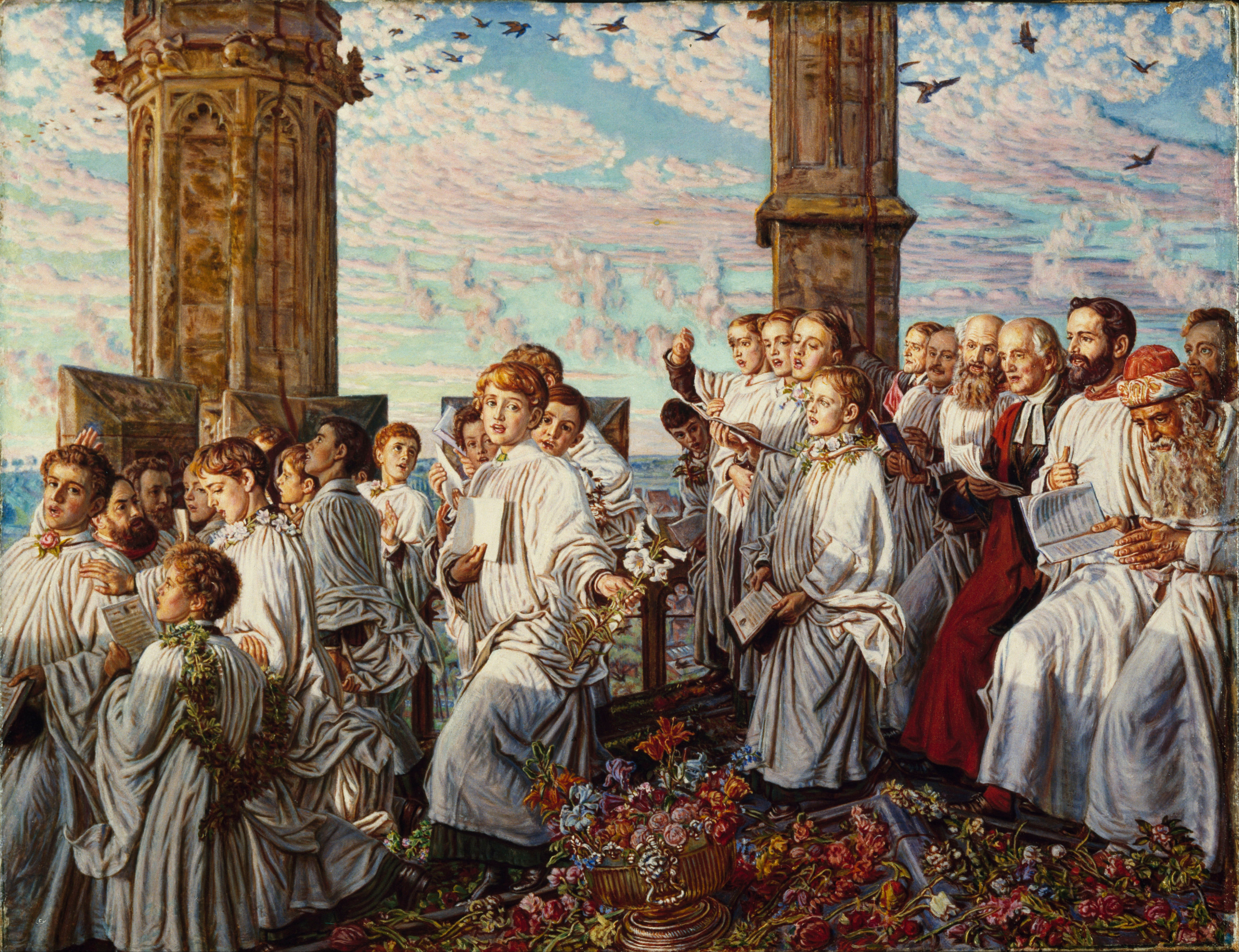
May Morning on Magdalen Tower, by Holman Hunt, 1890. Varley Roberts is pictured on the left, directing the choir.

On 9 November 1882, on the recommendation of Sir FAG Ouseley, Dr Purey-Cust, Dean of York, and Sir George J Elvey, late Organist of St. George's Chapel, Windsor, Roberts was elected organist and informator choristarum at Magdalen College, Oxford, in succession to Sir Walter Parratt (an exact contemporary of Varley Roberts, born in Huddersfield). He held this post for thirty-seven years, resigning with effect from 31 December 1918. In 1885, Roberts became a Freemason. He was initiated in Apollo University Lodge No.357. He became a familiar if "incongruous" figure in Oxford musical life, and on 22 February 1916 was awarded the degree of Master of Arts for his services to the university. During his time in Oxford, he was also organist of St Giles Church (1885–1893), founding Conductor of the University Glee and Madrigal Society (1885–93) and director of the Oxford Choral and Philharmonic Society. He led (until he became too infirm in old age) the May Morning singing from Magdalen Tower, a tradition going back over 500 years and which continues to this day. Varley Roberts’ directing of the singing is immortalised in a painting by Holman Hunt, though, characteristically, the choirmaster complained that he had not been given a more prominent position in the picture.

Roberts was an examiner for musical degrees at the university and a lecturer in harmony and counterpoint there. He composed many anthems, together with part-songs and cantatas as well as a number of organ works. He also gave organ recitals, though it was as a choir trainer that he was really famed. His book A Treatise on a Practical Method of Training Choristers became one of the best-known textbooks for choirmasters, first published in 1898, with subsequent editions in 1900, 1905, and 1914; while Magdalen College Choir was widely regarded as the very best in the country. He died on 9 February 1920 and was buried in Holywell Cemetery, Oxford, his funeral being attended by the famous organists and choirmasters of their day, as well as past choristers of the college who had been tutored by Varley Roberts. His house at 18 Holywell Street still exists.

== Appointment to Halifax Parish Church ==
When Joseph Henry Frobisher resigned in 1862 (he died in 1869), having been organist of Halifax Parish Church since 1838, the vacant post was not an attractive one. The salary was only £25 per annum and had been so since the eighteenth century, although the "Organ Trustees" promised to supplement this amount with money from the church's general subscription. However, the salary was below what could be expected for a post at a major parish church. Compare the £25 salary with the (admittedly exceptional) case of the organist of Leeds Parish Church, who at this time was being paid £200 per annum. The organ was very out of date compared with the latest fashion. The opportunities for choral music were also limited.

Henry Edwin Moore (1842–1915), Deputy Organist at Leeds Parish Church, was appointed organist in succession to Frobisher. However, under his direction, the choir of the Parish Church seems to have deteriorated, and he was asked to resign in 1868. Moore remained in Halifax as Organist of All Souls, Haley Hill and a "professor of music" as well as a conductor of local choirs. Thirty-seven people applied for the post vacated by Moore. Seven of these candidates were selected to take part in an open contest. The Organ Trustees must have been aware of the sinking musical reputation of their church, for not only were the auditions "professionally" conducted (Dr EG Monk of York Minster was the judge) but it was agreed that John Varley Roberts, the successful candidate, should be paid a minimum of £60 per annum - more than double Moore's salary.

== Roberts and the organ ==
Roberts was an intelligent church musician with a wide knowledge of the repertoire. At a time when most parish church organists were still playing transcriptions of choruses from Handel's oratorios, Roberts was regularly giving recitals of organ music by Bach and Mendelssohn. On his arrival at Halifax, Varley Roberts found the organ in a dreadful state – the action was noisy, the instrument was tuned to "mean-tone" temperament (thus limiting the number of keys in which music – and therefore the then modern church repertoire – could be played in tune), and the pedal organ of one stop was virtually useless. Largely due to his efforts, sufficient money was raised to begin work on the Snetzler instrument in 1869. Hydraulic blowing was installed, obviating the need for a human organ blower, while the manual compasses were standardised, a proper pedal section installed, and more fashionable stops added, while preserving the essence of the original 18th century work. At this time, the instrument remained in the west gallery, where the choir was also located.

== Roberts and the choir ==
We know from Mary Tankard, the well-known local soprano, that the choir was very small before Varley Roberts arrived. Tankard joined Halifax Parish Church in 1851, becoming principal soprano the following year, remaining for most of the next twenty years until her marriage in 1872. Under Frobisher and Moore, she was one of only nine singers. Upon her return to the Parish Church in 1871 (she had been at St James's from 1866), there were sixteen voices.

Within a few years of Varley Roberts' appointment, the number of choristers had risen from sixteen to seventy, and there were reports of even higher numbers at various times during the 1870s. In his Treatise, Roberts spoke of the "many years" in a "large manufacturing centre where he had a choir of one hundred voices, thirty-eight of whom were boys". The choir's standard of performance had improved too:

Halifax – on Monday the 6th ult., the new organ in Broad Street Wesleyan Chapel ... was opened by Mr JV Roberts, Mus. Bac., Oxon ... The programme consisted of an organ recital and service of song, and was selected from the works of the most classical writers. The vocal pieces were rendered by the Parish Church choir ... The local papers speak in the highest terms, both of the performance of Mr Roberts and the singing of his choir.

[From the Musical Times, February, 1873]

The choristers were also capable of performing an extensive repertoire. In 1877, a list of anthems used at the Parish Church was published. No fewer than 1004 anthems were listed, mainly by nineteenth-century English composers, but music by seventeenth- and eighteenth-century English composers, Beethoven and Brahms were also included.

By the time of the re-opening of the Parish Church in 1879 after the major refurbishment, the choir was an all-male one. It is assumed that the ladies of the choir retired when the west gallery was removed, and there are certainly hints in Roberts’ writings that he did not like female voices, especially contraltos. Speaking of his time at Halifax Parish Church, Roberts wrote:

For some few years it was the experience of the writer of this little Treatise to have a mixed choir of women and men, several of whom were professional singers. After a certain evensong when Boyce's anthem "O where shall wisdom be found" had been sung, an eminent musician who happened to be in the church, subsequently remarked of the singular and disastrous effect of a "thick" chest voice singing the highest part in the "verse" portion of the anthem ... He said the truth; nothing can replace the beautiful thin flute-like tone of the pure Alto...

Roberts’ Treatise... gives other interesting insights into his approach to choir training. Of attendance at rehearsals, he writes:

To ensure regular attendance, it is a good plan to give the boys some slight acknowledgement, be it ever so trifling. For many years the writer of this Treatise found the following system to work well...

1. A register of attendance was kept.
2. Boys were classified according to their proficiency in singing.
3. They were subdivided into four standards: those in the first received 2d each for each attendance; those in the second received 1½d; those in the third received 1d; and those in the fourth received ½d.

Emulation was thus promoted, and no payment whatever was given for singing on the Sunday – the surplice and cassock were a sufficient attraction. The boys were paid weekly, according to the number of attendances at the rehearsals. This frequent payment entailed some little trouble, but it satisfied the boys and ensured better attendance than if the payment had been made quarterly.

Where did the choristers come from? In the case of Magdalen, there was a choir school, and rich parents paid for their male offspring to attend. At Halifax, it would have been more of a case of local recruitment, though there was a Church School in what is now Causey Hall from 1867, and it may well be some boy choristers were recruited there. Roberts’ Treatise also gives us some clues as to the source of boy trebles for the choir.

The National or Board School in villages, where singing is universally adopted to brighten the daily routine of school life, is the best possible place to find Choristers, and the choirmaster or the schoolmaster (If the latter be more or less musical) will have little difficulty in selecting those boys who have musical voices. If the schoolmaster be also the choirmaster he will be of immense support to the clergyman, as the choristers will have the advantage of being more or less under discipline and constant supervision.

== The Oxford Movement at Halifax ==
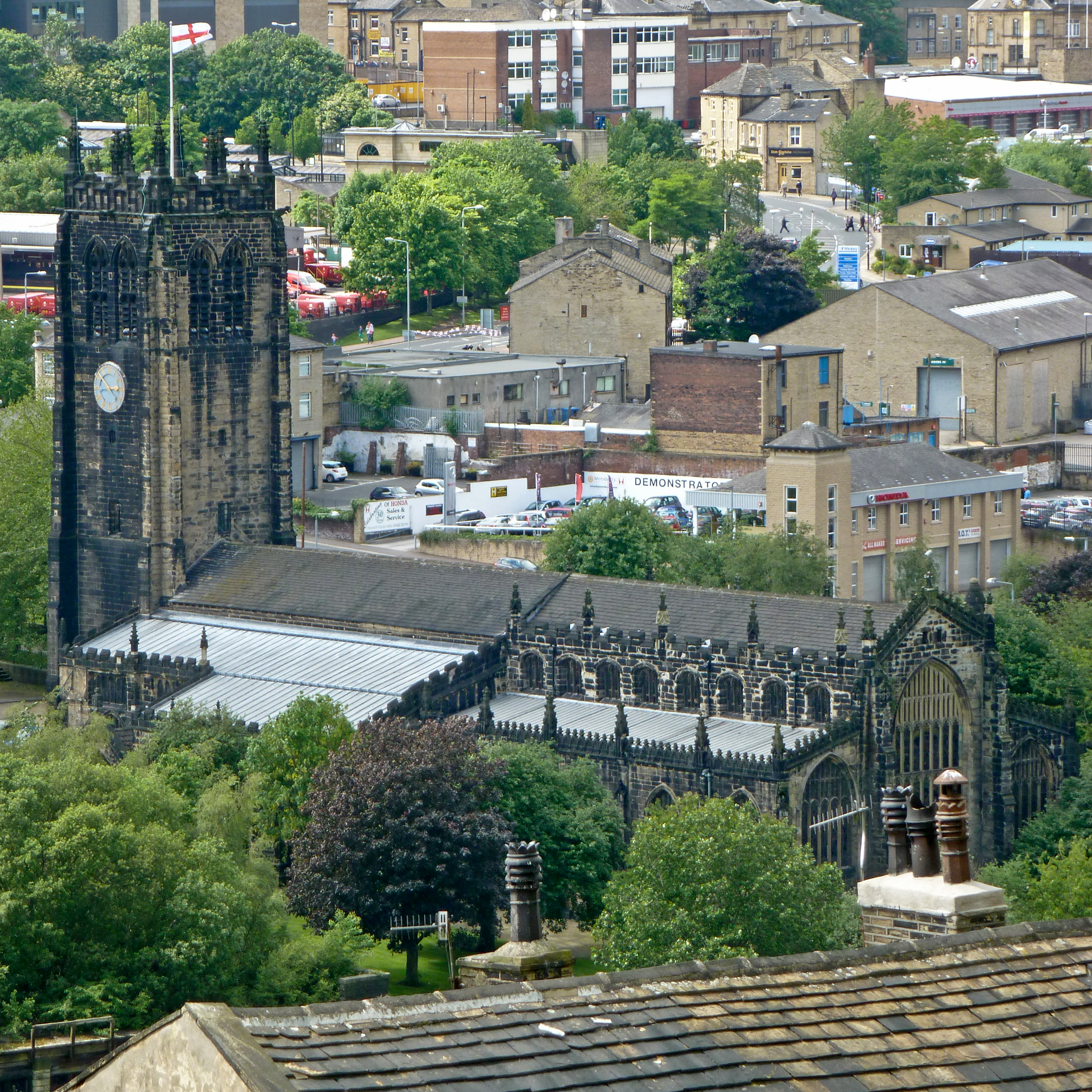
Halifax Parish Church, now Halifax Minster

The mid-nineteenth century was a period of great change in the Anglican Church. Already, we have seen how Varley Roberts had begun to transform the music at Halifax Parish Church by having the organ modernised and developing the choir. But the transformation was not yet complete. Victorian religious leaders of all types of churchmanship were determined to lift the Church of England out of its "torpor" that had lasted since the Georgian period. But how was this to be done? The ecclesiologists wanted to return to the basic principles of the early church and therefore placed the emphasis on plainsong, which would allow everybody to participate. We know that Varley Roberts thought little of the "Gregorians" (after Pope Gregory the Great, who was reputed to have devised the first plainsong). Other groups focussed on the ritual aspects of worship and aimed to stimulate people's feelings through the main elements of worship, such as music. The "high church" group was one name for some of these people, and they wished to improve the quality of music-making in churches as well as the types of composition performed. From the 1840s onwards, full choral services began to be introduced into major churches in London and elsewhere – and notably Leeds Parish Church in the north.

At the same time, the Church of England was founding a number of teacher training colleges (such as the one that Varley Roberts attended in York). Class music teaching was emphasised in these institutions. The graduates from these colleges would have gone out and taught children not just how to read and write but also how to sing, especially using tonic sol-fa. In other words, the old assumption that people could not read and write and therefore music had to be simple to be performed and appreciated no longer held true. In 1861, Hymns Ancient and Modern was published. This brought together for the first time the main hymns and hymn tunes that were increasingly finding favour in the Anglican Church and which ordinary members of the congregation would be able to use – and went on using – right into the twentieth century and more recently even. Great strides were being made in the technological aspects of organ building, meaning that larger, more powerful instruments could be built and distributed around the church almost at will. These are just some of the factors that meant that by the 1870s, the situation was ripe for an imaginative and ambitious musician such as Varley Roberts to make his mark.

In 1875, Canon Musgrave was succeeded by Francis Pigou (1832-1916), later Dean of Chichester and then Bristol. Pigou found the church fabric in a sorry state. In his book Phases of My Life, he described the building as a "charnel-house". The graves in the church were shallow, and the smell of decomposing bodies permeated the building. The interior was drab, and the furnishings were sorely in need of renovation. To a refined cleric, a graduate of Trinity College Dublin (1853), the atmosphere must have been hardly conducive to devotion and spiritual uplift. A complete refurbishment, updating and rearrangement of the building, sweeping away the galleries and pews and putting in place a collegiate or cathedral arrangement of a divided choir on opposite sides of the chancel, was required to bring Halifax Parish Church into line with modern ecclesiastical thinking.

Pigou did not only concern himself with the church building, however. In his book Odds and Ends he says:

It is part and parcel of the purpose of a cathedral that it should set forth and maintain, at considerable expenditure of musical talent and money, a high standard of musical rendering of Divine Service, not to be feebly imitated in every Parish Church, and certainly not with the slender resources both of musical talent and £ s d in village churches. But in the mother church of the diocese, the best, the very best of composition and skill and voice should find its home and expression.

Although not a cathedral, Halifax Parish Church was widely seen as the "mother church" of the district, and when the See of Ripon was divided in the 1880s, Halifax was a strong contender for the home of the new cathedral, though Wakefield eventually became the centre of the new diocese.

In 1879, the west gallery was removed and the organ completely rebuilt on the north side of the chancel by Abbott & Smith of Leeds. The old Snetzler case was used for the north-aisle front, and a completely new case, designed by John Oldrid Scott, was erected in the choir. As finished, the rebuilt organ was one of the largest in the country. Roberts himself described the rebuild in some detail in a pamphlet reproduced for the commissioning of the new organ. The instrument had all the latest stops and accessories, including two of Walker Joy's patent hydraulic engines. The organ's transformation – begun in 1869 – was now complete. No longer was it an instrument used for leading metrical psalms, playing voluntaries and acting as continuo instrument for performances of oratorios such as Messiah, but, as happened to almost all eighteenth-century instruments in major churches during the Victorian period, a true cathedral organ, capable of accompanying full choral services as well as leading massed congregational singing, as required.

To mark the re-opening and re-dedication of the church and the re-building of the organ, an "octave" of services, each with an anthem and a sermon, was held during the week beginning 7 October 1879. The all-male choir – for whom new pews had been provided in the chancel – wore their robes for the first time at these services. On examination of the music lists for the "octave", one can see that Varley Roberts had lost no time in putting Pigou's ideas on the music of the "mother church" into practice. While there were congregational hymns, the emphasis was very much on the choral, with not only all the psalms appointed for each day (sung, one assumes, by the choir alone), but also anthems and settings by the leading church composers of the day, including Roberts himself. Walter Parratt, Roberts’ predecessor at Magdalen, and one of the pre-eminent players of the time, gave an organ recital on the rebuilt instrument soon after it was completed.

During this period, Halifax Parish Church was the rival of many top choral establishments. Several members of the choir left to become cathedral lay-clerks, as for example (Daniel) Sutton Shepley (1853–1931), who became chief bass of the Chapel Royal. Pigou was very proud of his choir and never failed to boast about their high standards when he had the opportunity. He writes:

Often have I, when preaching at one of our cathedrals, had a hearty shake of the hand after the service from some lay-clerk who knew me in Yorkshire. The chief bass of the Chapel Royal, St James’, at that time was Mr Shepley, who had been in my choir at Halifax. The sub-dean of the Chapel Royal was much put out by me saying, when he asked me how I thought the choir rendered the Litany one Sunday morning, I replied, "I should have been ashamed of it at Halifax!"

It is interesting to note that later, during his time at Magdalen, Varley Roberts appointed a number of alto, tenor, and bass singers with working-class backgrounds from northern parish church choirs.

As is still the custom, the music at cathedral services was performed by the choir only, with the exception perhaps of the hymns. At Magdalen College, Varley Roberts – with the support of the authorities – developed such fully choral services, excluding the congregation from all but passive involvement. A visitor to the college in 1895 wrote:

Visitors are requested, by means of cards posted in the ante-chapel, to join silently in the service. Hymns are rarely sung, the music being primarily of the impressive order, and visitors are admitted only by courtesy to the chapel proper; but the ante-chapel is open to the public until service time.

A colourful anecdote reinforces this approach:

Whenever anyone in the congregation in Magdalen College was so presumptuous as to sing along with the choir, Roberts would lean over the edge of the gallery and yell, "Shut up!" On one occasion the gentleman concerned protested, saying, "This is, after all, the House of God!" "True," responded Roberts, "But it is also Magdalen College Chapel, and I will thank you to hold your peace, sir!"

}

His approach in Halifax (as in most other parish churches) seems not to have been so exclusive, however, but a mixture of congregational and participatory combined with choral and exclusive. His obituary in The Times for 10 February 1920, entitled "A Great Choirmaster", states that at the Parish Church "with its large opportunities, he was successful both with choir and congregational music [new emphasis]" and his editing and updating of Cheetham's Psalmody suggests a demand for congregational music at the Parish Church during Varley Roberts’ tenure of office. The Psalmody was a hugely popular collection of tunes for the psalms and canticles, first published around 1741 and updated from time to time – including by other Organists of the Parish Church – subsequently. Roberts' version included a supplement of congregational pieces (including hymn tunes and psalm chants) written, compiled, and arranged by him. Five editions were published between 1875 and 1877. In his Treatise, he is at pains to point out that it is far better to sing simple music well than more complex choral music badly:

Do not select music too difficult for the particular choir in hand ... Unless "services" and anthems can be thoroughly well sung by a competent choir, it is better to aim at warm and hearty congregation singing. Select "singable" music for this object.

Nor was his music making exclusive to the church. Both at Halifax and Magdalen College, Roberts was an influential figure outside the confines of the choir stalls and the organ loft. Reference has already been made to his giving organ recitals and his work as a conductor, taking his Halifax choir to perform at other venues, and individual members of the choir sang (occasionally as soloists) with the local music societies such as the Philharmonic Society, the Quartett [sic] Union (founded 1871), the Haley Hill Choral Society and the Halifax Choral Society. He also led the many Deanery choral festivals, which brought the church choirs of the locality together to perform fully choral services, including music composed by Roberts himself.

== Roberts as composer ==
Varley Roberts composed some forty anthems, four complete services, organ solos, songs, part songs, and the cantata Jonah already mentioned in connection with his 1876 DMus. While at Halifax he composed the anthem, Seek ye the Lord, which according to Clay in his History of the Music of Halifax Parish Church "made known his name unto the ends of the earth". Roberts’ music is tuneful, often (as with Call to Remembrance and Seek ye the Lord) beginning with a solo section before the full choir enters, repeating the opening melody, somewhat in the style of seventeenth- and eighteenth-century verse anthems. Other anthems are "full" throughout. The style is straightforward, with little counterpoint and unchallenging organ accompaniments. The harmonic language is very much of its time, with Mendelssohn and Samuel Sebastian Wesley being two obvious influences, though the textures perhaps also hark back to eighteenth-century models, especially in the organ or piano parts. The longer works employ recitative, as for example The Passion, which clearly owes something both to Stainer's Crucifixion and the broader oratorio style. This was not a period of great church or secular music. It was only with the rise of Parry, Stanford and Elgar that both sacred and secular music reached the heights of Purcell and Handel. Nevertheless, Varley Roberts’ music served a purpose, whether in church or at home. A former chorister wrote of his work:

The compositions of Roberts, which are numerous though all fall naturally under one of a small number of groups, seem to be in some danger of being underrated through forgetfulness of one quality which marks them in high degree. Some composers have apparently made their works difficult by intention, perhaps in order to frighten off second-rate performers from them. Others ... seemed to have cared very little whether their works were easy or difficult ... Roberts was fond of saying that the perfect performance of a good musical composition would only be found in heaven; but he always thought in terms of the perfect performance, and every unnecessary difficulty should therefore be avoided as an obstacle. It would be a mistake to infer that there is little difference between the performance of a composition by Roberts, whether the executants are a first-rate choir or otherwise; it may be felt to be true on the contrary that the highest efficiency frequently shows itself most markedly in the rendering of a work that is commonly described as "easy". But it is possible for artists who are not of first-rate calibre to give a performance of a composition by Roberts which is at any rate approximately adequate; and it appears likely that his works will not only last through their popularity but will also deserve to last as examples of remarkable skill shown in acting on a principle which is the right one itself.

== Roberts as organist ==
Reference has already been made to Varley Roberts’ calibre as an organist, and he himself "would not have claimed to be in the same class" as other leading players – notably cathedral organists – of his generation. But for Roberts, the organ was for accompaniment rather than solo work. In the Treatise he writes:

Nothing is more fatal to good singing than for a choir to be distressed by a continuously loud accompaniment on the organ. The organ is not for the purpose of overwhelming the singing, but to accompany it.

In his organ accompaniments, Varley Roberts showed "rare discrimination and taste as to tone quality, and, although sometimes lacking in what is called 'snap', he never indulges in any of the coarse contracts that many English organists are so fond of". This very much fits with the later Victorian approach, with a very definite divide between church and the more virtuosic "town-hall organists".

== Roberts as choir trainer ==
We do not know whether Pigou and Roberts were on good terms of friendship, (though the latter dedicated his ballad The Far-Off Land to Mrs Pigou), but there is no doubt that the Vicar of Halifax appreciated his organist's uncommon talents as a choir trainer. He paid tribute to Roberts’ ability in Phases of My Life. Roberts always maintained that his success with choristers was largely due to his time at the teacher training college in York. He had a simple approach to choral singing:

After a convention in which many papers on the training of voices were read ... Roberts called together his choir and told them, "Now, lads, you have heard a great deal about the voice in the last few days, but I've got just this to say to you and don't you forget it. All you've got to do is to stand up, throw your heads back and sing; all the rest's humbug."

A former chorister remembers him as a forthright Yorkshireman of upright moral character who had a firm belief in the "wrath of God". The respect which the boys had for their choirmaster must have been mingled with no small measure of fear, especially as the reminiscence refers to his "periodic outbursts". Nevertheless, his magnetic personality ensured that he was held in great esteem by those who came under his influence:

He never spared himself, was seldom absent from the Service...and always exacted the highest standard of attention and effort from all members of the Choir. There can have been few choristers of Roberts’ time who did not feel affection for him when they have had any experience of his care, not only for their musical improvement, but also for their intellectual and moral development in all respects, and of his continual interest in any of their pursuits or hobbies.

Roberts clearly recognised his role and responsibilities as a church organist:

For an intelligent interpretation of the musical part of the church service, no doubt very much depends upon the taste and culture of the organist. He should be, first of all, "a churchman", and if possessed of devotional feeling himself, that feeling will be conveyed to the choir by his playing; if he be devoid of such devotional instinct, then he is unfitted for the post he holds, no matter how able an executant he may be. It is scarcely too much to say that the beauty and interpretation of the music rest almost entirely with the organist; for he has the power, by means of his instrument and the choir, to emphasise and "bring out" so strikingly the meaning of the words ... Correct musical expression comes from the heart – no mere mechanical observance of "light and shade" will ever be satisfactory.

His obituary in The Times comments:

But his real secret could not be conveyed in any book. It was the magnetism of his own personality, his natural gift of compelling every member of a choir which came under his sway, man, women, or boy, and especially the latter, to give out their best and fullest response, and his contagious eagerness that the performance should be at once of the most perfect and energetic kind.

And of Varley Roberts himself, the obituary continues:

A thorough Yorkshireman, in build, in appearance and dialect, full of the rugged humour of his county, of which he was intensely proud, strong in the confidence of his own ability and powers of judgement, he feared no one, neither don nor dignitary.
