= Benjamin Rogers (musician) =

English organist and composer

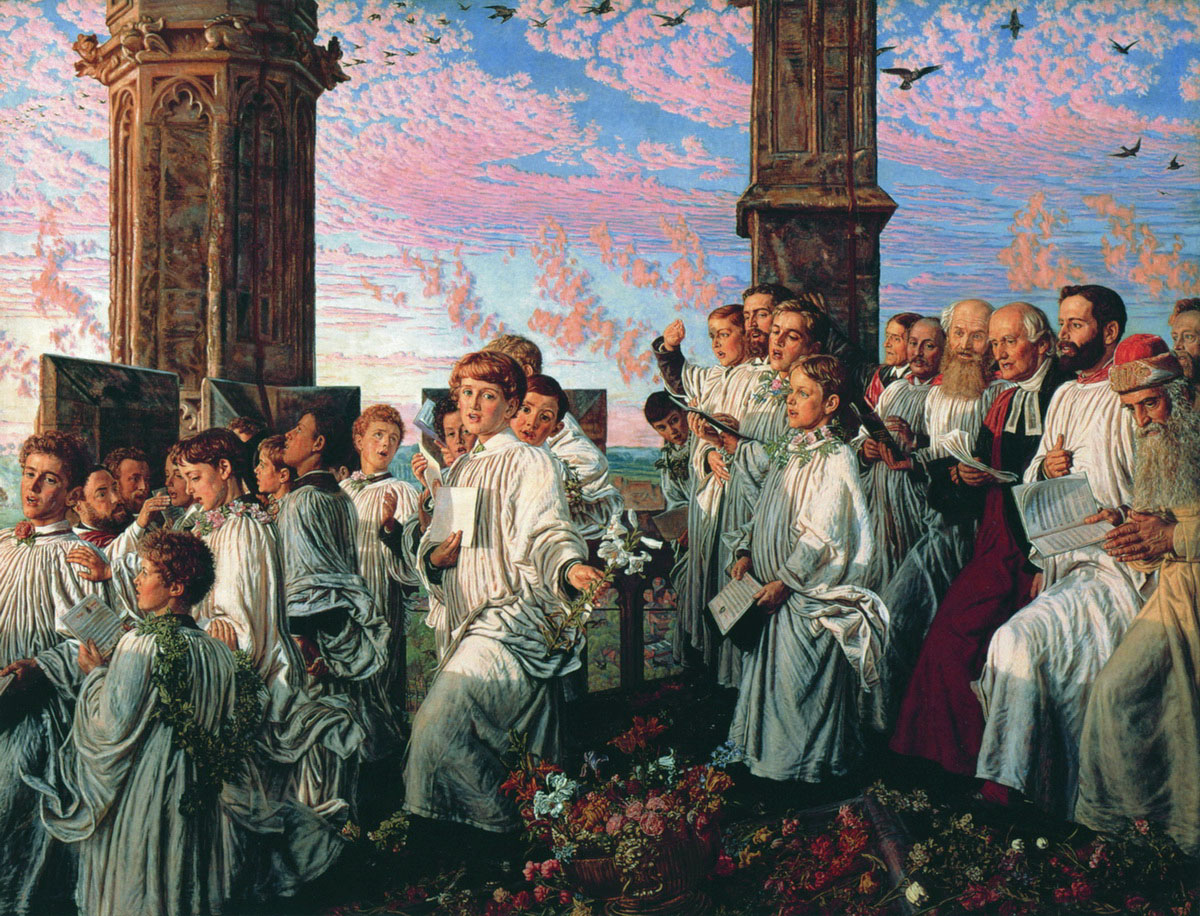
May Morning on Magdalen Tower by William Holman Hunt: the Magdalen College Choir sings, the occasion for the annual performance of the hymn Te Deum Patrem colimus by Benjamin Rogers

Benjamin Rogers (May 1614 – June 1698) was an English organist and composer, widely known in Europe in his time. Modern taste prefers his consort music, where his reputation in the 18th century was for liturgical music and anthems. His Hymnus Eucharisticus beginning Te Deum Patrem colimus is sung annually on Magdalen Tower on May Day morning.

== Life ==
Born at Windsor, and baptised at the church of New Windsor on 2 June 1614, he was the son of George Rogers of Windsor. He was a chorister of St. George's Chapel under Nathaniel Giles, and then a lay clerk.

In 1639, Rogers succeeded Randolph Jewett as organist of Christ Church Cathedral, Dublin. The outbreak of the Irish rebellion of 1641 drove him back to England, and he returned as singingman to Windsor; the choral services there were discontinued around 1644. Occupied with composition and teaching, Rogers maintained himself, with the help of a small government allowance, in the neighbourhood of Windsor.

With Oliver Cromwell's mandate, dated 28 May 1658 and probably through Nathaniel Ingelo, Rogers obtained the degree of Bac. Mus. at Cambridge. For the city banquet given to Charles II to celebrate the English Restoration of 1660, he supplied the music both to a hymn by Ingelo and to Psalm 32. He was reappointed lay clerk of St. George's Chapel, was substitute at the organ for William Child, and played the cornett.

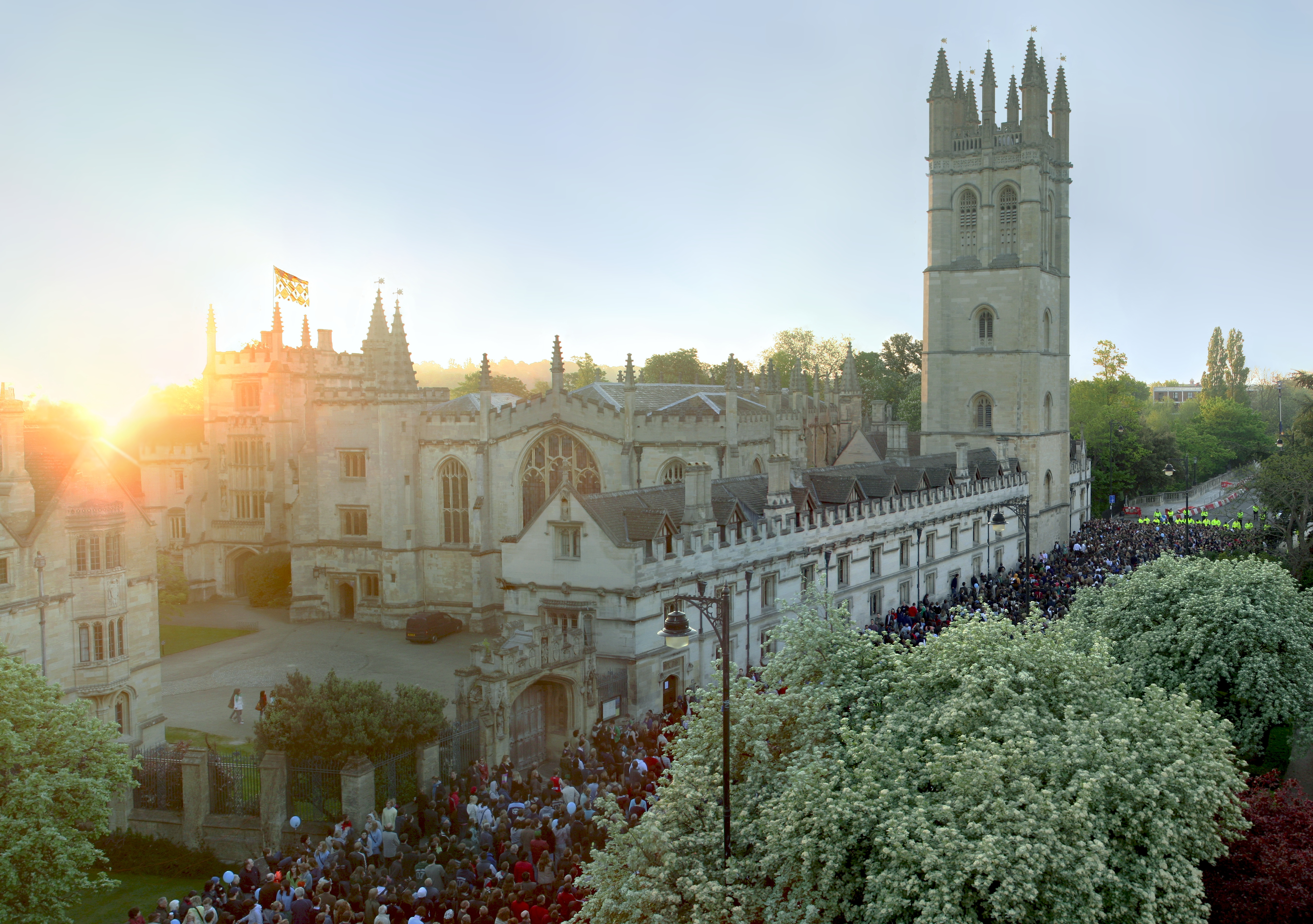
May Day 2007, crowds gather at Magdalen College, Oxford to hear the Hymnus Eucharisticus by Benjamin Rogers sung from the Tower

Rogers won high reputation in England by his music for the Church of England and by his reorganisation of major choirs. In 1662, he was also appointed organist to Eton College. Invited by Thomas Pierce to Magdalen College, Oxford, he took over the organ and choir there in 1665, with a salary and college rooms. On 8 July 1669, he proceeded Mus. Doc. at Oxford.

In January 1686, Rogers lost his college place at Magdalen. Unpopular with the choir, and a loud talker in the organ loft during services, he was lodging in his rooms his daughter, who was pregnant by the college porter. He was also claiming those rooms were haunted. He took a college pension.

Rogers retired to New Inn Hall Lane, Oxford, and died there, aged 84, in 1698. He was buried on 21 June at Church of St Peter-le-Bailey.

== Works ==
By 1653, consort music by Rogers was heard at the court of the future Emperor Leopold. When Ingelo went as chaplain to the Swedish embassy under Bulstrode Whitelocke, he presented to Queen Christina some of Rogers's music, which was performed by her Italian musicians. His Court-Masquing Ayres were well-received in Holland.

Rogers's major works were in collections of cathedral music. Anthems were preserved in college and cathedral libraries.

== Family ==
Rogers was married to Ann, who survived him by a few months. Their son John, born in 1654, was B.A. 1674, M.A. 1677, and clerk 1674–81.
