= John Rouse Bloxam =

English academic and clergyman

John Rouse Bloxam (1807–1891) was an English academic and clergyman, the historian of Magdalen College, Oxford.

== Life ==
Born at Rugby on 25 April 1807, he was the sixth son of Richard Rouse Bloxam, D.D. (died 28 March 1840), under-master of Rugby School for 38 years, and rector of Brinklow and vicar of Bulkington, both in Warwickshire, who married Ann, sister of Sir Thomas Lawrence. All six sons were foundationers at Rugby School, and all attended, as chief mourners, the funeral of Lawrence in St Paul's Cathedral.

Bloxam was sent in 1814 to Rugby School, where he was a school-fellow of Roundell Palmer, and obtained an exhibition at the University of Oxford in 1826. He matriculated from Worcester College, Oxford on 20 May 1826 and was bible clerk there from that year to 1830. From 1830 to 1835, he held a demyship at Magdalen College and graduated B.A. from that college on 9 February 1832, having been in the fourth (honours) class in classics in 1831. He was ordained deacon by the bishop of Oxford in 1832 and priest in 1833, and took the further degrees of M.A. in 1835, B.D. in 1843, and D.D. in 1847.

In July 1832, Bloxam became chaplain and classical master in the private school at Wyke House, near Brentford, where Dr. Alexander Jamieson was principal, and from 1833 to 1836, he was second master at Bromsgrove School. He was elected probationer fellow of Magdalen College in 1835 and came into residence in 1836. He served as pro-proctor of the university in 1841, and he held at his college the posts of junior dean of arts (1838 and 1840), bursar (1841, 1844, 1850, 1854, and 1859), vice-president (1847), dean of divinity (1849), and librarian (1851 to 1862).

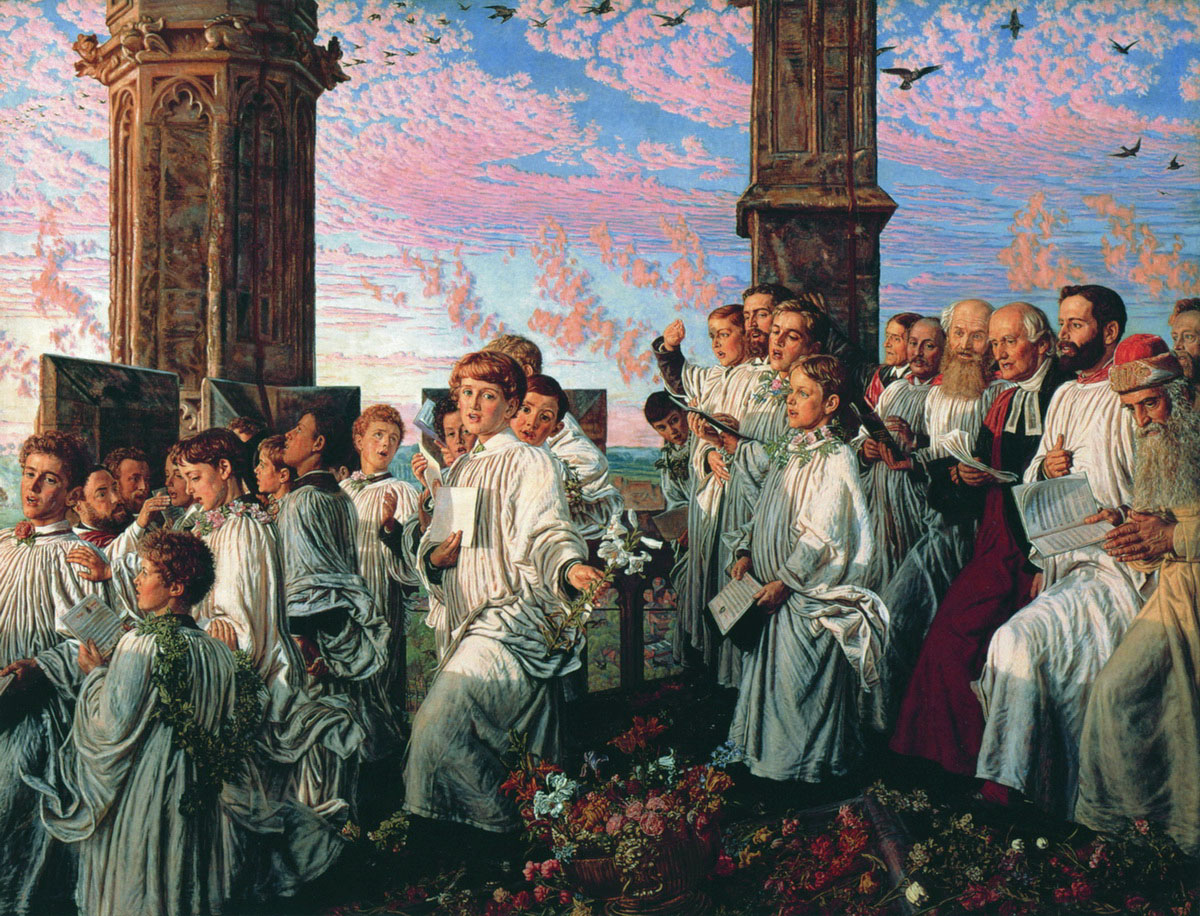
Bloxam played a part in reviving the May Morning ceremony on the tower of Magdalen College. In tribute, William Holman Hunt included him in his 1890 painting of the ritual May Morning on Magdalen Tower; Bloxam is fourth from the right.

From 1837 to February 1840, Bloxam was curate to John Henry Newman at St Mary and St Nicholas, Littlemore. He was in full sympathy with the Tractarians, and well acquainted with William George Ward. An accident introduced him to Ambrose Phillipps de Lisle. They corresponded in 1841 and 1842 on a possible reunion of the Anglican and Roman churches. In 1842, he proposed going to Belgium to superintend the reprinting of the Sarum breviary. He continued to live at Oxford until 1862, where he was conspicuous as a striking figure.

Bloxam was appointed by his college to the vicarage of Upper Beeding, near Steyning in Sussex, in February 1862, and vacated his fellowship in 1863. Newman paid several visits to him there, and he was probably the last of the cardinal's Oxford circle. Frederic Rogers, 1st Baron Blachford, called Bloxam "the grandfather of the ritualists". He died at Beeding Priory, Upper Beeding, on 21 January 1891, having enjoyed good health almost until the last, and was buried in Beeding churchyard. He is a prominent figure in William Holman Hunt's picture of the ceremony on Magdalen College tower on May day morning.

== Works ==
His Register of the Presidents, Fellows, Demies, Instructors in Grammar and in Music, Chaplains, Clerks, Choristers, and other Members of St. Mary Magdalen College, Oxford came out in seven volumes, describing the choristers, chaplains, clerks, organists, instructors in grammar, and demies. Their publication began in 1853 and ended in 1881, and an index volume was issued by the college in 1885. His collections for the history of the fellows, presidents, and non-foundation members were left to the college, and on them W. D. Macray based his Register of the Members of St. Mary Magdalen College, Oxford. The appendix to the third volume of E. M. Macfarlane's catalogue of the college library contains a Catalogus operum scriptorum vel editorum by its chief alumni which Bloxam had gathered together. In that library is a Book of Fragments, privately printed by him in 1842, which gives a series of extracts from various books on ecclesiastical rites, customs, etc. It ends abruptly on page 286, having been discontinued on account of a similar publication entitled Hierurgia Anglicana brought out by the Cambridge Camden Society.

In 1851, Bloxam edited the Memorial of Bishop Waynflete by Peter Heylyn for the Caxton Society, and he collected the series of documents entitled Magdalen College and James II, which was published by the Oxford Historical Society in 1886. He assisted Martin Routh in his 1852 edition of Gilbert Burnet's Reign of James II. E. S. Byam dedicated to Bloxam the memoir of the Byam family (1854), and he assisted W. H. Payne Smith in editing the volume of M. H. Bloxam's collections on Rugby, the School and Neighbourhood.

He possessed four volumes of Opuscula, containing many letters of Cardinal Newman and prints of persons at Oxford, which went to the manuscripts in Magdalen College Library.

== Sources ==
Attribution

This article incorporates text from a publication now in the public domain: Lee, Sidney, ed. (1901). "Bloxam, John Rouse". Dictionary of National Biography (1st supplement). Vol. 1. London: Smith, Elder & Co.
