= May Morning on Magdalen Tower =

Painting by William Holman Hunt

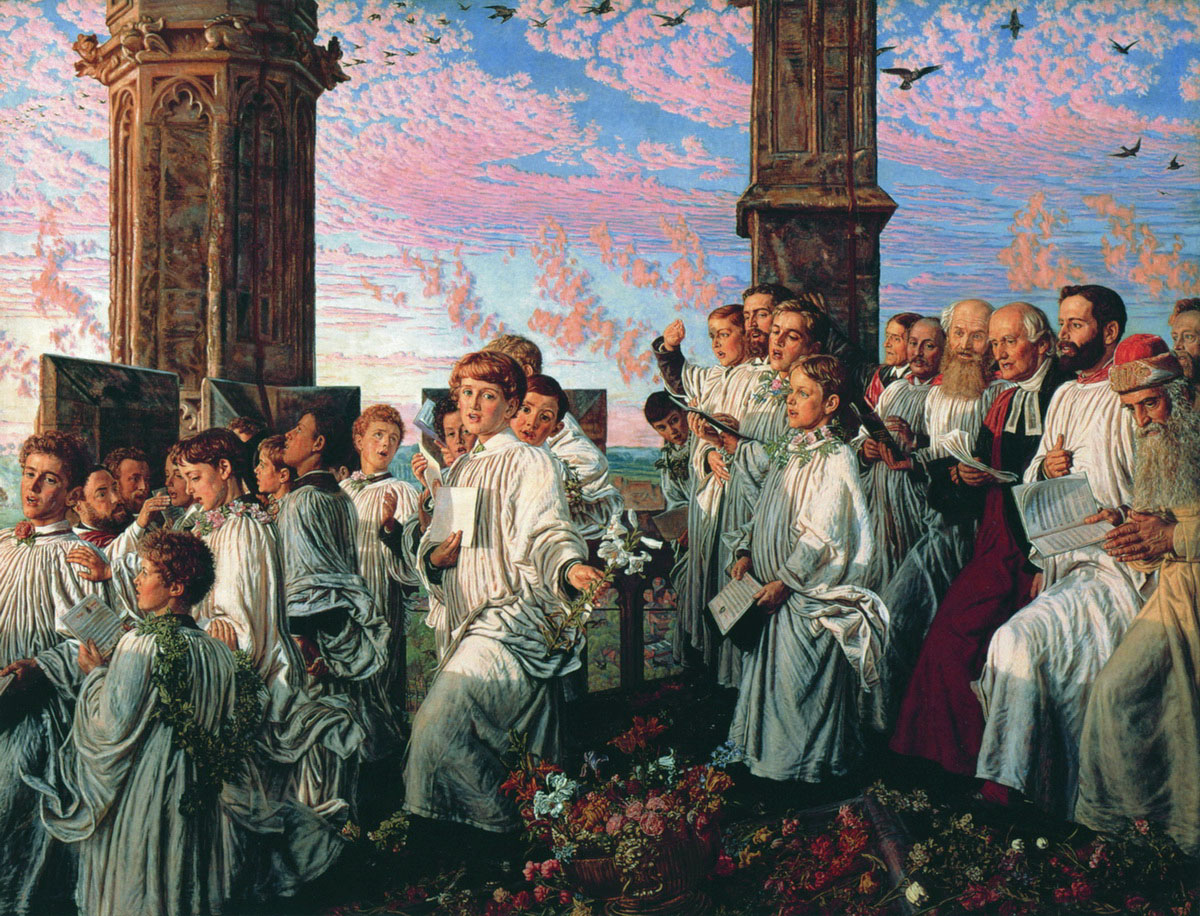
- May Morning on Magdalen Tower
- Artist: William Holman Hunt
- Year: 1890
- Catalogue: LL 3599
- Medium: Oil on canvas
- Movement: Pre-Raphaelite
- Subject: May Morning choir on top of Magdalen Tower in Oxford
- Dimensions: 200 cm × 154.5 cm (79 in × 60.8 in)
- Location: Lady Lever Art Gallery, Liverpool
- Owner: National Museums Liverpool
- Accession: Transferred from the private collection of William Lever, 1st Viscount Leverhulme, 1922

May Morning on Magdalen Tower is an 1890 Pre-Raphaelite oil painting by William Holman Hunt (1827–1910).

== Description ==
The painting depicts Magdalen College Choir singing on top of Magdalen Tower in Oxford during May Morning celebrations. Traditionally, the choir sings two hymns, the Hymnus Eucharisticus and "Now Is the Month of Maying", at 6 o'clock in the morning to start the annual celebration in Oxford on 1st May. The painting is in the collection of the Lady Lever Art Gallery in Liverpool.

The Magdalen College choirmaster John Varley Roberts (1841–1920) is pictured on the left with a beard, directing the choir. Two of Roberts' predecessors are also in the painting, Sir John Stainer (1840–1901, organist at Magdalen College during 1860–1872, sixth from the right in the painting), and Stainer's successor, Sir Walter Parratt (1841–1924). Stainer was the Heather Professor of Music at the University of Oxford by the time the painting was finished. John Rouse Bloxam (1807–1891), organist and historian of Magdalen College, is fourth from the right. Holman Hunt also drew a coloured portrait of Bloxam in chalk.

== Alternative version ==
Holman Hunt produced another smaller version of the painting during 1888–93 (in a circular frame, made 1889–90). This is held by the Birmingham Museum and Art Gallery. This version was started as an en plein air study at dawn on top of the tower. The frames for both paintings were made at the Guild of Handicraft, an institution established by the Arts and Crafts architect and designer Charles Ashbee (1863–1942).
