= Randolph Jewett =

English organist and composer

Randolph Jewett, or Randal Jewett (1602/3 – 3 July 1675) was an English organist and composer. He was a cathedral organist in Dublin, later in Winchester.

== Life ==
Jewett was born in Chester, son of Randle Jewett, a merchant, and grandson of William Jewett, Mayor of Chester in 1578. He was a chorister at Chester Cathedral from 1612 to 1615. He was described by John Hawkins as being a pupil of Orlando Gibbons. It is thought he was still in Chester in 1628, soon afterwards moving to Dublin.

Jewett is said to have received the (honorary?) degree of Mus. Bac. at Trinity College Dublin. Jewett was organist in Dublin of St Patrick's Cathedral and Christ Church Cathedral, in 1631; was succeeded at Christ Church by Benjamin Rogers in 1639; and was vicar-choral of St. Patrick's for a brief period in 1639, and again in 1641. He was vicar-choral of Christ Church in 1646.

About this time (probably on the suppression of cathedral establishments) Jewett came to England, and was admitted minor canon of St Paul's Cathedral in 1661. For a short time before his death, Jewett was the organist of Winchester Cathedral. He died at Winchester in July 1675. He describes himself in his will as Randolph Jewett of Winchester, gentleman, and it is possible that he was never ordained. Jewett left his property to his wife Anna (died 1692), his son Benjamin (died 1691), who graduated B.A. from Magdalen College Oxford in 1669, his daughter Deborah, and his grandchildren, John, Elizabeth, and Mary Jewett. Monuments of the family are in the north transept of Winchester Cathedral.

== Works ==
The solo funeral anthem "I heard a voice", said in Tudway's collection, vol. iii. (Harl. MS. 7339), to be by Mr Jewett of Exeter, is, with three more anthems and collects in Clifford's Divine Services, ascribed to Randolph Jewett.
