= Halifax Minster =

Minster church in West Yorkshire, England

- Minster and Parish Church of St John the Baptist
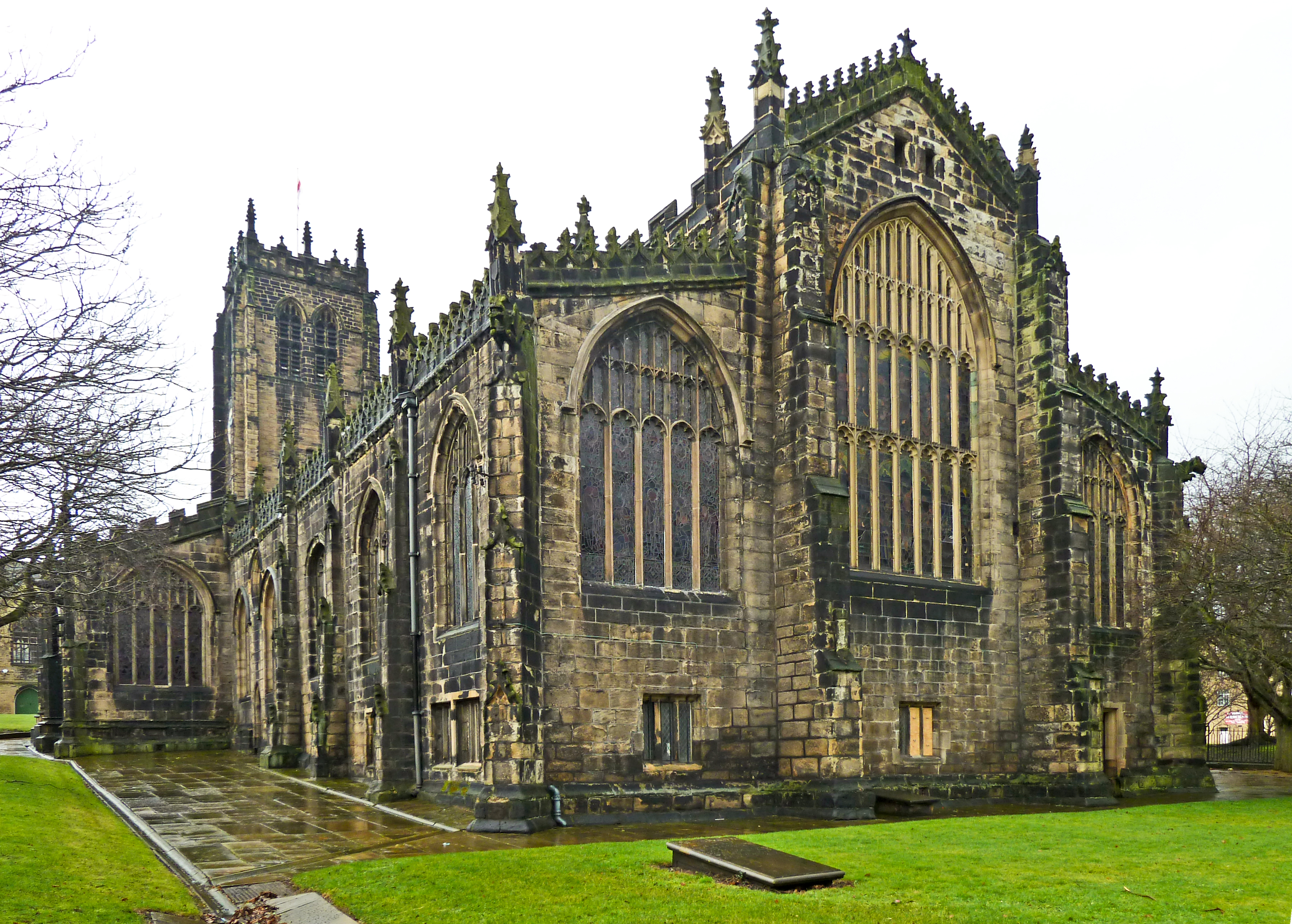
- Halifax Minster
- 53.72320°N 1.85371°W
- OS grid reference: SE 0975 2521
- Country: England
- Denomination: Church of England
- Previous denomination: Roman Catholic
- Churchmanship: Broad Church
- Website: www.halifaxminster.org.uk

History
- Status: Active
- Dedication: St John the Baptist

Architecture
- Heritage designation: Grade I listed building
- Architectural type: Perpendicular Gothic

Administration
- Province: York
- Diocese: Leeds
- Archdeaconry: Halifax
- Deanery: Halifax
- Parish: Halifax

Clergy
- Vicar: Canon Hilary Barber
- Priest: David Carpenter

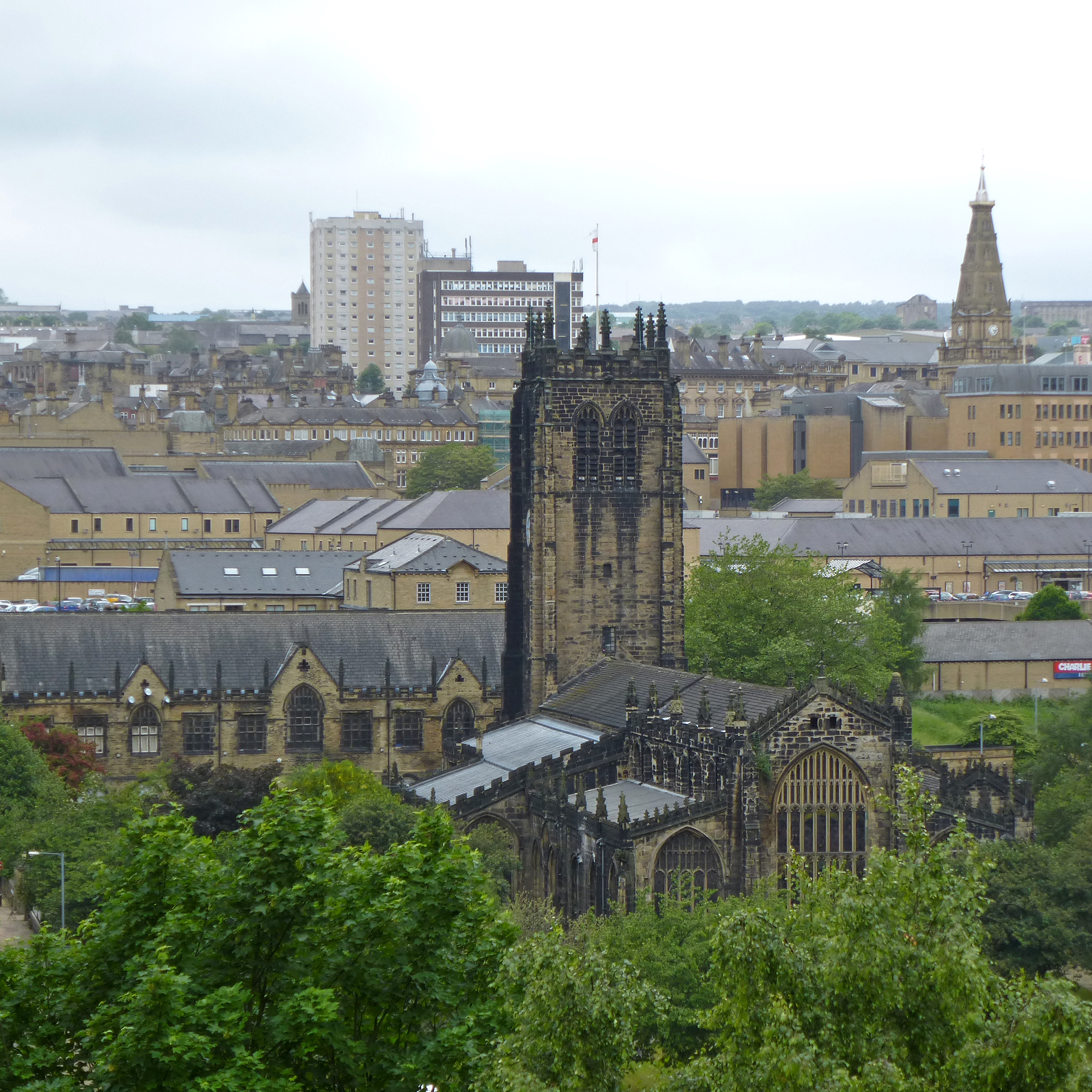
Aerial view of Halifax Minster with the town hall to the right and the surrounding area

Halifax Minster is the minster church of Halifax, Calderdale, West Yorkshire, England. The church is dedicated to St John the Baptist. The parish church of the town, it was granted minster status in 2009. Halifax Minster is one of three churches in the county of West Yorkshire to be given this honorific title; the other two are Dewsbury Minster and Leeds Minster.

Halifax Minster, which stands on the site of an earlier Norman church, was built during the 15th century, although the Rokeby and Holdsworth Chapels were not completed until around 1530. The organ contains much-altered elements by John Snetzler in 1763 and installed in 1766 but is mainly an instrument by Abbott and Smith, later rebuilt and partly revoiced by Harrison & Harrison of Durham. Other notable features of the church include a medieval font cover, Jacobean box pews, and the tombstone of 19th-century diarist Anne Lister.

== History ==
The first church on this spot, thought to date from around 1120, was owned and operated by the Cluniac monks of Lewes Priory. Some portions of the stonework of this church have been incorporated into the present building – most notably the carved chevron stones in the north wall of the nave and elsewhere. It has been suggested that one section of the north wall was actually the south wall of the Norman church. Several early medieval grave covers also survive.

The present church was built in the fifteenth century, apparently fulfilling a need for "more spacious accommodation for the growing population of the parish". The nave and chancel were completed around 1450. At some time between 1455 and 1480, the eastern wall was made higher to accommodate a clerestory. Work on the church tower began in the 1440s; it took over three decades to complete, as it was still under construction in 1482. The Rokeby and Holdsworth Chapels, built at the expense of former vicars William Rokeby and Robert Holdsworth, were completed around 1530. William Rokeby's heart and bowels are buried beneath his chapel, as stipulated in his will.

Jacobean box pews are a prominent feature of the Minster, and most of those in the nave date from 1633 to 1634. A pew in the centre aisle bears the remains of a memorial brass to John Waterhouse, who died in 1539/40. The carved arms of Richard Sunderland of High Sunderland, who died in 1634, are attached to another pew. Several ancient pew nameplates may be seen attached to a board on the inner north wall of the tower, the oldest dates to 1615 and reads: "This stall made at the cost of Robert Fisher of Halifax."

A small portion of medieval stained-glass survives in the upper westernmost clerestory window, which was removed from other windows in the mid-19th century. The Puritans, who were prominent in the town in the 17th century, thought stained glass with its "images" was an abomination. During the Commonwealth (1649–1660) many plain-glass leaded windows of a unique design were installed, paid for by Mrs Dorothy Waterhouse. Many of these were later replaced by Victorian stained glass, but those that survived in 1958 were carefully rebuilt. At that date there were three of these on each side of the chancel, but now there are five on the south side and only one on the north.

The large west window in the tower is a late 19th-century reconstruction of a Commonwealth window dating from 1657, but contains no original work. The great east window of the church depicts the crucifixion and resurrection of Jesus, and was completed in 1856. It is the work of George Hedgeland (1825–98), and is based on a design which won first prize for stained glass at the Great Exhibition of 1851. The remaining glass in the church dates also from the Victorian and Edwardian periods.

In 1878 and 1879 a great internal restoration of the church took place, initiated by Vicar Francis Pigou (1875–88), and carried out under the direction of George Gilbert Scott and his son John Oldrid Scott. This work involved the removal of galleries, the altering of floor levels, and the removal of plaster from the internal walls.

A more recent reordering scheme took place in 1983, when pews at the east end of the nave were removed, and a dais installed for the nave altar. At the millennium, after an appeal, Victorian pews were removed from the west end of the church, to provide a more open reception area, with adjacent fitted kitchen.

On 31 March 2007, the stand of the 1st Battalion, Duke of Wellington's Regiment (West Riding) Regulation Colours were laid up in the church. The Colour party, with 2 escorts of 40 troops, marched through Halifax from the town hall, preceded by the Regimental Drums and the Heavy Cavalry and Cambrai Band. There was a short ceremony in the Minster grounds where the troops were inspected by Colin Stout, the then-Mayor of Halifax, and Ingrid Roscoe, Lord Lieutenant of West Yorkshire.

The church was granted minster status on 23 November 2009.

== Features ==
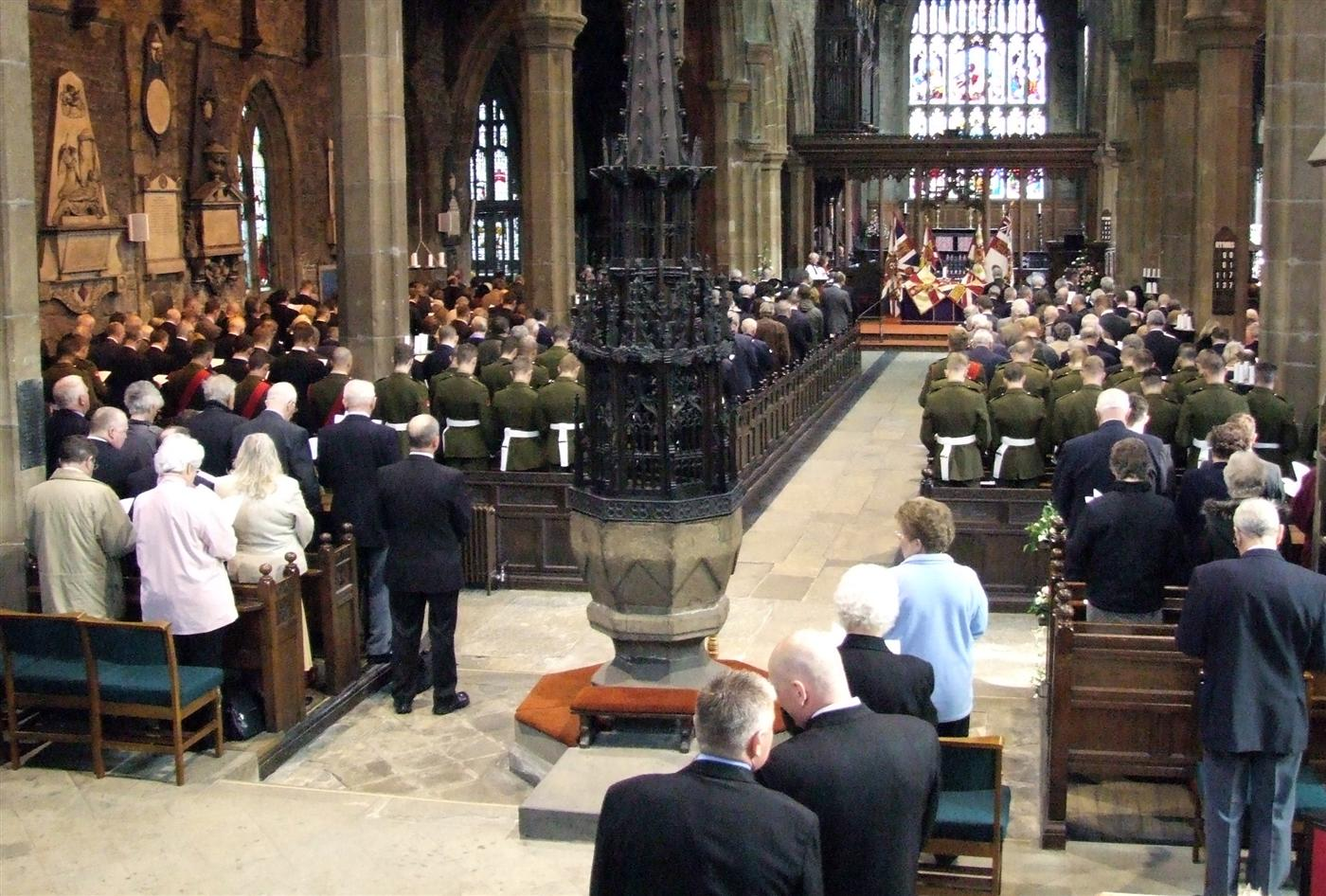
View of the font at the rear end of the main aisle

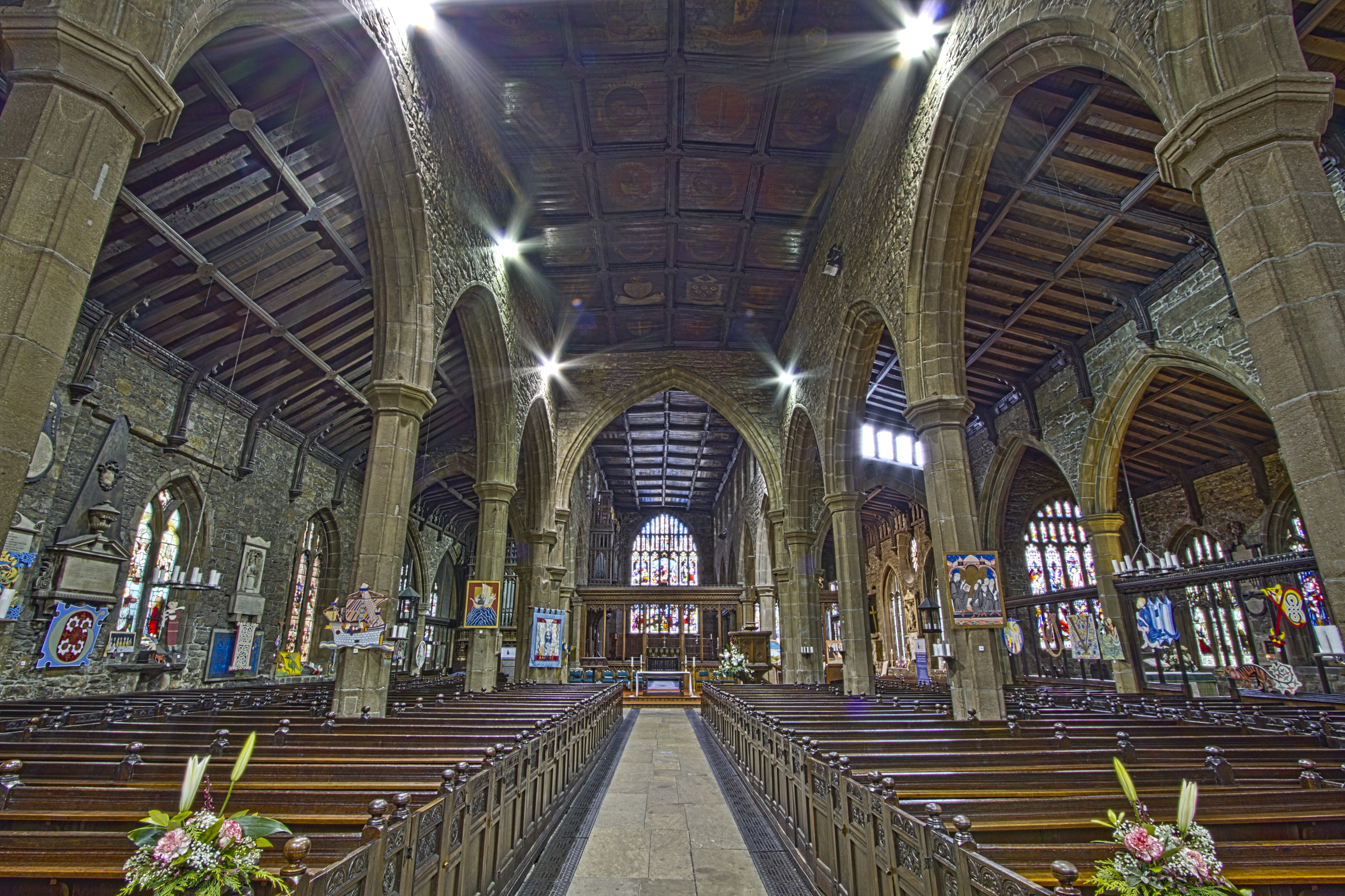
The main nave

- The font cover is a feature surviving from the medieval period, and is acknowledged to be one of the finest in England. The stone font bowl may also date from the 15th century, or earlier. Before 1879 traces of paint could be seen on both font and cover, and it was once ornately gilded. The cover was originally intended to prevent people from stealing the baptismal water kept in the font, which was supposed to have curative powers.
- The wooden sedilia in the sanctuary date from the 15th century, and were restored in 1879. They contain three misericords, and were possibly brought from some nearby abbey – such as Kirkstall – after Henry VIII's Dissolution of the Monasteries.
- Six other 15th-century misericords, including a Green Man, are located under the chancel's return stalls.
- A set of late 17th-century altar rails, with a fine double-spiral carving. The altar was first railed-in by 1665; these rails were replaced by the present "twisted banisters" in 1698.
- A series of painted ceiling panels, representing the heraldry of the vicars and famous families of Halifax Parish. These were originally painted by James Hoyle, and were put in place between about 1696 and 1703, but were repainted in 1815–16, and cleaned in 1948.
- Two Royal Coats of Arms of Queen Anne, dating from 1705. They were carved by John Aked.
- The alms-box is held by a life-sized wooden effigy known as "Old Tristram", carved by John Aked about 1701. The carving is believed to represent a real person who once begged in the church precincts.
- The Bishop Ferrar Memorial dating from 1847 is a feature of the western wall of the south aisle. From Halifax parish, Bishop Robert Ferrar of St David's was earlier the last prior of Nostell Priory. He was burnt at the stake at Carmarthen in 1555. The sculpture is by Joseph Bentley Leyland.
- A painted bust of John Favour (vicar 1593–1624) is adjacent to the Ferrar Monument. Favour was a celebrated physician and lawyer, and the founder of Heath Grammar School, Halifax.
- The Wellington Chapel. Halifax was the home of the Duke of Wellington's Regiment, which is now the 1st battalion of the Yorkshire Regiment. In 1951 the church's south choir aisle was adopted by the Regiment as its chapel. Among the Regimental Colours previously displayed were those carried at Waterloo and those borne during the Crimean War and Abyssinian campaign. These Colours have now been placed in a protective stand of drawers that will remain in the church.
- A pulpit on wheels. This was given in 1879 in memory of Archdeacon Charles Musgrave (vicar 1827–75), by members of his family.
- The recently rediscovered tombstone of Anne Lister of Shibden Hall (1791–1840), a noted local diarist. The stone is damaged and is currently displayed along with an informative banner in the south aisle of the nave.
- On the west wall near the tower is a list of former rectors and vicars. The most famous were Hubert Walter, who later became Archbishop of Canterbury, and William Rokeby, who became Archbishop of Dublin.

== Organ ==
The organ (IVP/53) is mostly by the Leeds organ builders Abbott and Smith incorporating a small amount of much older material by John Snetzler from 1766 and other pipework added in 1928 as shown below. The organ has therefore been enlarged several times in the 19th and 20th centuries although since 1868 it has not been the largest in Halifax. A snapshot in November 2025 shows it as the most substantial organ in working order locally as the organs in both All Souls' Church and the Victoria Hall (Victoria Theatre) are currently unplayable and the new instrument at St Paul's Church, King Cross is under construction. It was completely rebuilt in 1928 by Harrison & Harrison of Durham.

Recent minor attention to the instrument has made some change to its tonal effect but, after almost one hundred years, a major rebuild and renovation is long overdue.

=== List of organists ===
Date	Name	Previous / Later position
1766	William Herschel	afterwards organist at Octagon Chapel, Bath
1766–1819	Thomas Stopford	previously organist at Hey Chapel
1819–1834	John Houldsworth	
1835–1838	Robert Sharp	
1838–1862	Joseph Henry Frobisher	
1862–1868	Henry Edwin Moore	previously deputy organist at Leeds Parish Church
1868–1882	John Varley Roberts	previously organist at St Bartholomew's Church, Armley, afterwards Informator Choristarum at Magdalen College, Oxford
1882–1883	Fred Bentley	
1883–1884	T. T. Liddle	
1884–1897	W. H. Garland	
1897	George Milligan	
1897–1911	F. de G. English	
1911–1915	Joseph Soar	afterwards organist of St David's Cathedral
1915–1924	F. de G. English	
1924–1929	Thomas E. Pearson	previously organist at St Bartholomew's Church, Armley
1929–1937	Reginald Tustin Baker	afterwards organist of Sheffield Cathedral
1937–1939	Kenneth F. Malcolmson	afterwards organist of Newcastle Cathedral
1939–1941	Vernon Rhodes	
1941–1963	Shackleton Pollard	
1963–1965	Robert Smith	
1965–1968	Neil Wade	
1968–1970	Cyril Baker	
1971–2010	Philip C. Tordoff	
2010–2015	Chris Brown	
2015–resigned	Graham S. Gribbin	

== See also ==
- Grade I listed churches in West Yorkshire
- Listed buildings in Halifax, West Yorkshire
