= Bentivolio and Urania =

Bentivoglio and Urania is an English prose historical romance and religious allegory. It was written by the clergyman Nathaniel Ingelo, and published from 1660 by Richard Marriot. It is identified as a Puritan work of fiction. Regarded as an unsuccessful imitation of the Argenis of John Barclay, from four decades earlier, it has also been thought a possible source of inspiration for the Pilgrim's Progress (1678) of John Bunyan.

The allegorical plot was intended to depict a concept of the human soul based on the traditions of Christian mysticism, to criticize the political ideas of Thomas Hobbes and his followers, and to defend the Puritan political idea of theocracy.

== Background ==
The prose romance form was briefly in vogue in England during the period 1650 to 1665, and the work (two volumes, 1660 and 1664) went through four editions by 1682. It sold well. Its allegory in the style of Edmund Spenser was influenced by a work of Henry More, like Ingelo one of the Cambridge Platonists, the Psychodia Platonica from 1642.

The title characters are explained by Ingelo in the book's introduction. In the allegory, Bentivolio represents God's will, while his sister Urania represents heavenly light. As it occurs in the Faerie Queene of Spenser, "heavenly light" is associated with knights in full armour, and with the purity of the human soul, picking up on Christian mysticism's view of the soul illuminating the body.

== Content ==
The book was conceived as instructive, on the theme of the ascent of the soul. It defends Puritan concepts of theocracy and divine providence, in the tradition of the Solyma Nova (1649) of Samuel Gott. It also gives an account of the Levellers' defeat. The character Antitheus is portrayed negatively as a Hobbesian in the Interregnum sense.
