= Founders Tower =

Historic Tower in Magdalen College, Oxford, England

Coordinates: 51.7522°N 1.2468°W

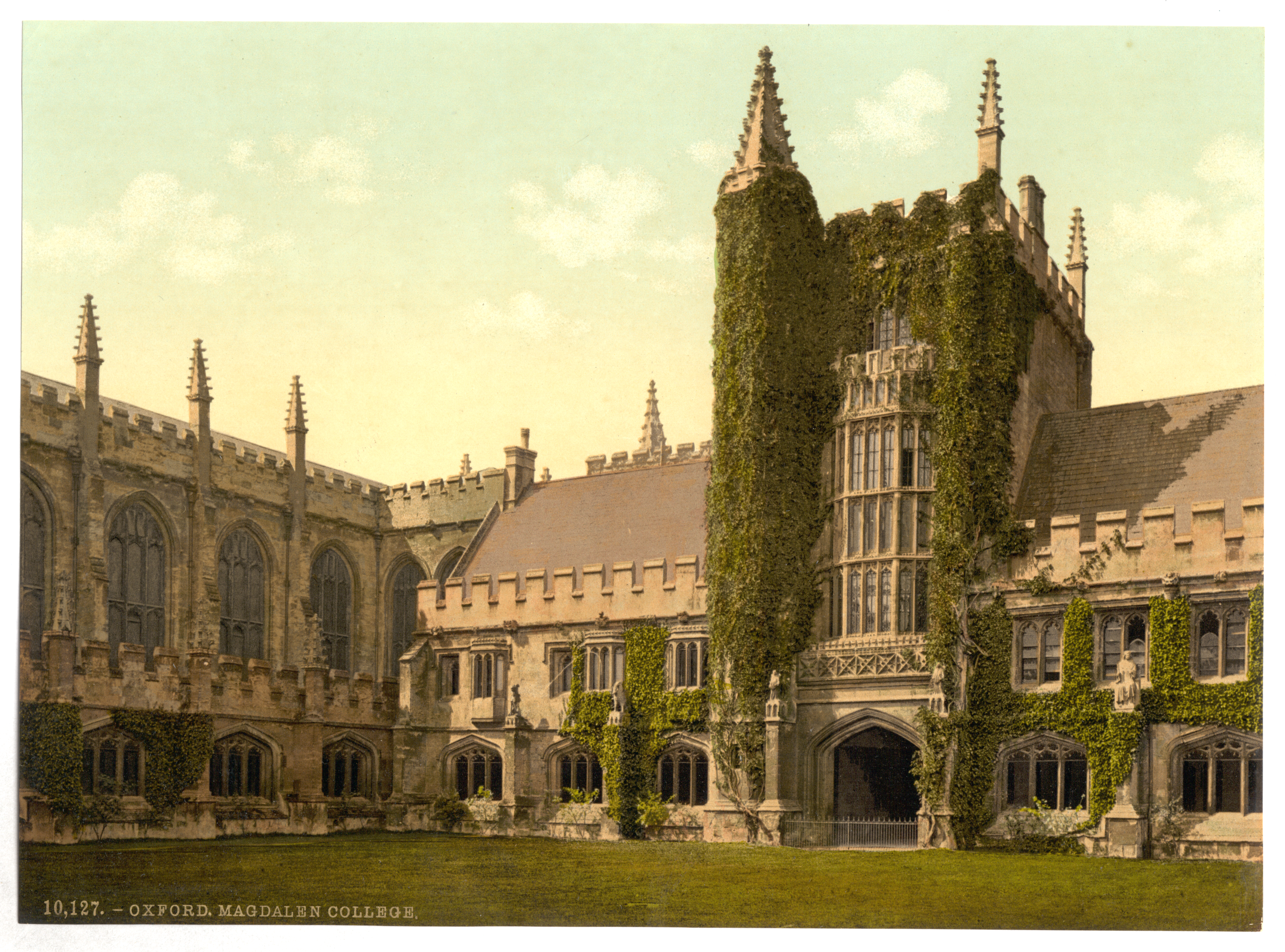
Magdalen College, Founder's Tower and Cloisters, Oxford, England (Photochrom Print, circa 1890-1900)

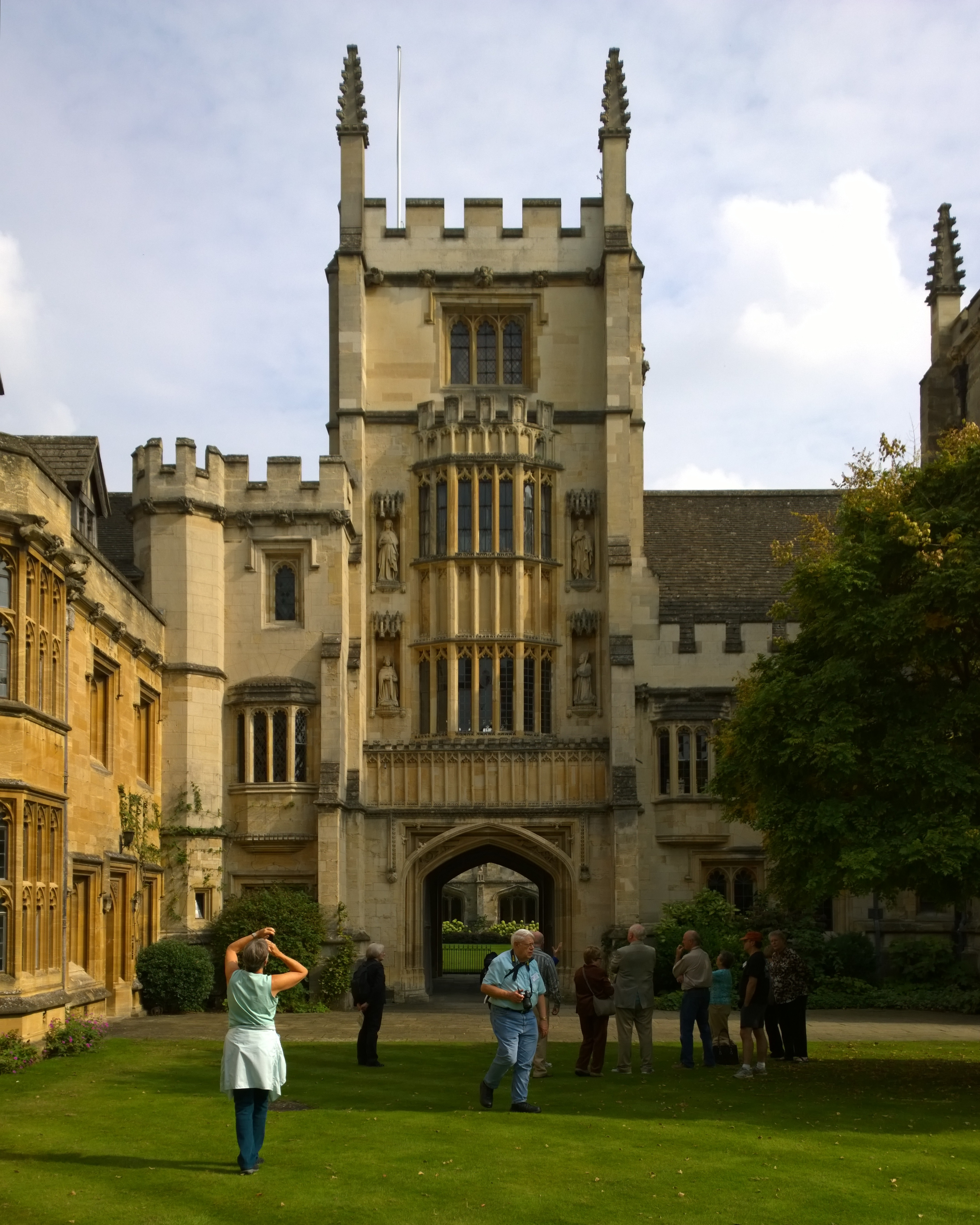
Founder's Tower

Founder's Tower is a tower in Magdalen College, Oxford, England.

It is the second-highest tower in the college, after the Great Tower. It is very slightly taller than St. Swithun's Tower, which faces it across St John's Quad.

Founder's Tower houses the entrance to the Old Library, and sits above the main entrance to the Cloisters. Despite the views of the college from the top of the tower, access is restricted.

It is listed on the National Heritage List for England.

== See also ==
- Magdalen Great Tower (Magdalen College)
- Tom Tower (Christ Church)
- National Heritage List for England
