= Barley-Break =

Barley-Break is an old English country game frequently mentioned by the poets of the 17th and 18th centuries. It was played by three pairs, each composed of a man and a woman, who were stationed in three bases or plots, contiguous to each other. The couple occupying the middle base, called hell or prison, endeavoured to catch the other two, who, when chased, might break to avoid being caught. If one was overtaken, he and his companion were condemned to hell. From this game was taken the expression "the last couple in hell", often used in old plays.

Its use in literature usually has sexual connotations. The best known example is in Thomas Middleton and William Rowley's play The Changeling, in which an adulterer tells his cuckold "I coupled with your mate at barley-break; now we are left in hell". The use of the phrase in Thomas Morley's ballett "Now Is the Month of Maying" probably means something similar to the idiom "roll in the hay".
