= Nathaniel Ingelo =

Nathaniel Ingelo (c. 1621–1683) was an English clergyman, writer and musician, best known for the allegorical romance Bentivolio and Urania (1660 and 1664).

== Life ==
He graduated M.A. at Edinburgh, and then was incorporated at the University of Cambridge. He was made a Fellow of Queens' College, Cambridge by Edward Montagu, 2nd Earl of Manchester and parliamentary visitors; he was Fellow there from 1644 to 1646. At Cambridge, he met and admired the Cambridge Platonist Henry More: Bentivolio and Urania is influenced by his thought. He was unsuccessful as minister to the Independent congregation at Broadmead, Bristol, who found his taste in clothes too loud and disapproved of the church music which was his passion. He then became a Fellow of Eton College in 1650.

He went as chaplain on Bulstrode Whitelocke's 1653 embassy to Sweden. On that occasion Andrew Marvell addressed a Latin poem to him. Marvell was a friend from Eton. where he was tutoring William Dutton, ward to Oliver Cromwell. The poem was actually intended for Queen Christina of Sweden, and was duly presented to her by Whitelocke. Ingelo himself performed music by Benjamin Rogers for the Queen.

He became rector of Piddlehinton, Dorset, where he had the living from 1671 to 1677. He was Rede Lecturer in 1676.

John Wilmot, Earl of Rochester mentions Ingelo (as well as Richard Sibbes and Simon Patrick) in his poem A Satyr against Reason and Mankind.

== Works ==
- The perfection, authority and credibility of the holy scriptures (1658)
- A sermon preached at St. Pauls (1659)
- Bentivolio and Urania (1660)
- A discourse concerning repentance (1677)

His text "We sing to him whose wisdom form'd the ear" was set to music by Henry Purcell.

== See also ==
- Hymnus Eucharisticus
