= Hymnus Eucharisticus =

Hymn sung at Magdalen College, Oxford

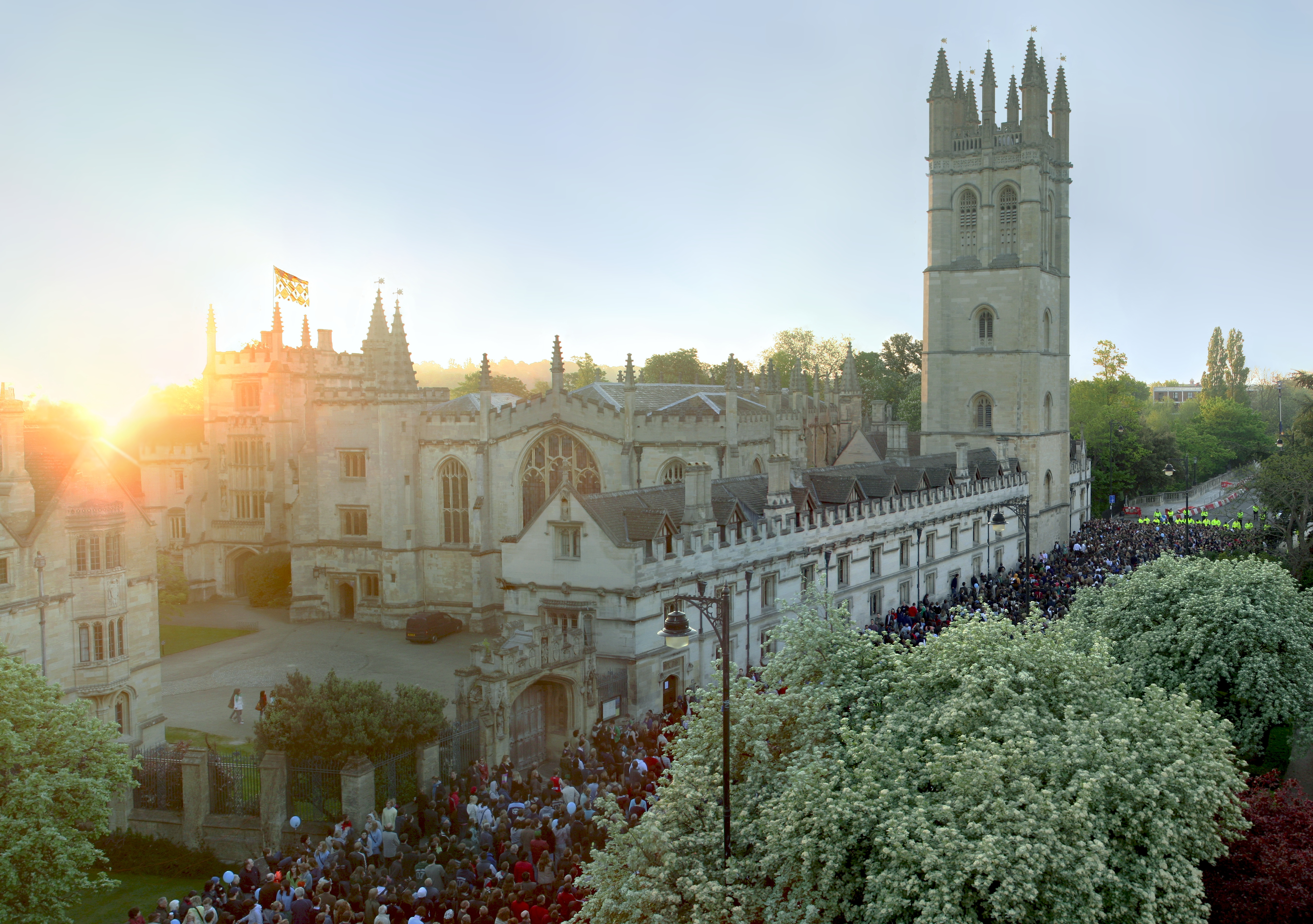
View of the Magdalen Tower on May Morning, 2007.

The Hymnus Eucharisticus is a traditional hymn sung by the choir of boy choristers and academical clerks of Magdalen College, Oxford in England, supported by professional stipendary clerks. The choristers are boys from Magdalen College School and the academical clerks are students from Magdalen College at the University. The hymn is best known for its role in the events of May Morning, a 500-year-old tradition where the choir sings the hymn from Magdalen Tower at 6 a.m. each year on 1 May. This initiates the annual May Morning celebrations in Oxford. Large crowds gather in the High Street and on Magdalen Bridge to listen. The sound is very faint, although more recently amplification has been used. The crowds then disperse for other celebratory activities such as Morris Dancing. The hymn is also sung from the gallery of the college's Great Hall (the dining room) during important college occasions.

The music was composed by Benjamin Rogers, "Doctor of Musique of the University of Oxon, 1685", and is entered on a folio bearing the date 1673, indicating that it may have been written prior to that date. The lyrics were alleged to have been written by Nathaniel Ingelo, to be sung "at the civic feast at Guildhall on the 5th July, 1660, while the king and the other royal personages were at dinner"; however, the words of Ingelo's hymn differ significantly.

The Hymnus Eucharisticus appears in several movies and television programmes, including most notably Richard Attenborough's film Shadowlands (1993) on the later years of C.S. Lewis, starring Sir Anthony Hopkins (as Lewis) and Debra Winger. Lewis, a Christian apologist and author, taught at Magdalen College, which was founded in 1458 by William Waynflete, Bishop of Winchester and Lord Chancellor, on the site of the Hospital of St. John, just outside Oxford's East Gate.

== Lyrics ==
Te Deum Patrem colimus,
Te laudibus prosequimur,
qui corpus cibo reficis,
coelesti mentem gratia.

Te adoramus, O Jesu,
Te, Fili unigenite,
Te, qui non dedignatus es
subire claustra Virginis.

Actus in crucem, factus es
irato Deo victima
per te, Salvator unice
vitae spes nobis rediit.

Tibi, aeterne Spiritus
cuius afflatu peperit
infantem Deum Maria,
aeternum benedicimus.

Triune Deus, hominum
salutis auctor optime,
immensum hoc mysterium
ovante lingua canimus.

We worship you, O God the Father,
we offer you our praise,
for you nourish our bodies,
and minds with heavenly grace.

We adore you, O Jesus,
you, the only begotten Son,
you, who did not disdain
to submit to birth in the Virgin's womb.

Driven onto the cross, you were made
the victim of God's wrath.
Through you, our only Saviour,
hope of life returned to us.

To you, Eternal Spirit
by whose breath was born
by Mary the Infant God,
be our eternal blessings.

Triune God, of all humanity
the great author of salvation,
this immense mystery
our tongues all cheer and sing.
