= Magdalen Bridge =

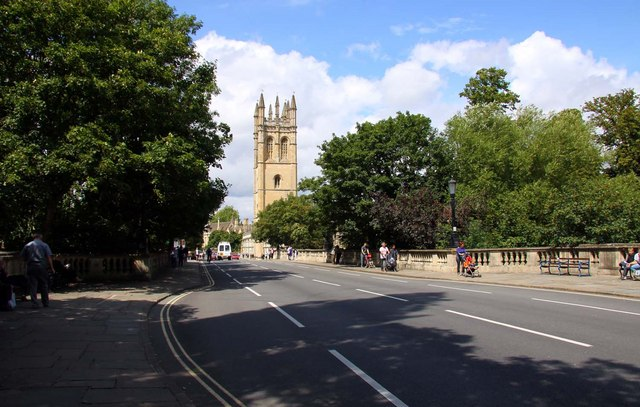
- View of the bridge looking towards central Oxford with Magdalen Tower in the background.
- Coordinates: 51.751°N 1.246°W
- Carries: Road
- Crosses: River Cherwell
- Locale: Oxford, England

Characteristics
- Design: Arch
- Material: Stone
- No. of spans: 11

History
- Opened: 1790

Location
- Interactive map of Magdalen Bridge

Magdalen Bridge /ˈmɔːdlɪn/ spans the divided stream of the River Cherwell just to the east of the City of Oxford, England, and next to Magdalen College, whence it gets its name and pronunciation. It connects the High Street to the west with The Plain, now a roundabout, to the east.

== Antecedents ==
This point of the Cherwell has been used for crossing since ancient times. The first known reference to a bridge goes back to 1004 and originally it was probably a wooden trestle construction or a drawbridge. By the 16th century a late medieval stone bridge had replaced the wooden one. This bridge was about 1,500 feet (460 m) long and was formed by 20 arches.

By the 1770s, the stone bridge was too narrow for the increasing traffic, as it did not allow two vehicles crossing safely. In addition to this, the structure was becoming unsound due to the combination of two factors: a generalized lack of maintenance and the negative effects of regular flooding. Eventually some of the arches of the western side collapsed during the floods of February 1772, making the bridge irreparable.

== The new bridge ==
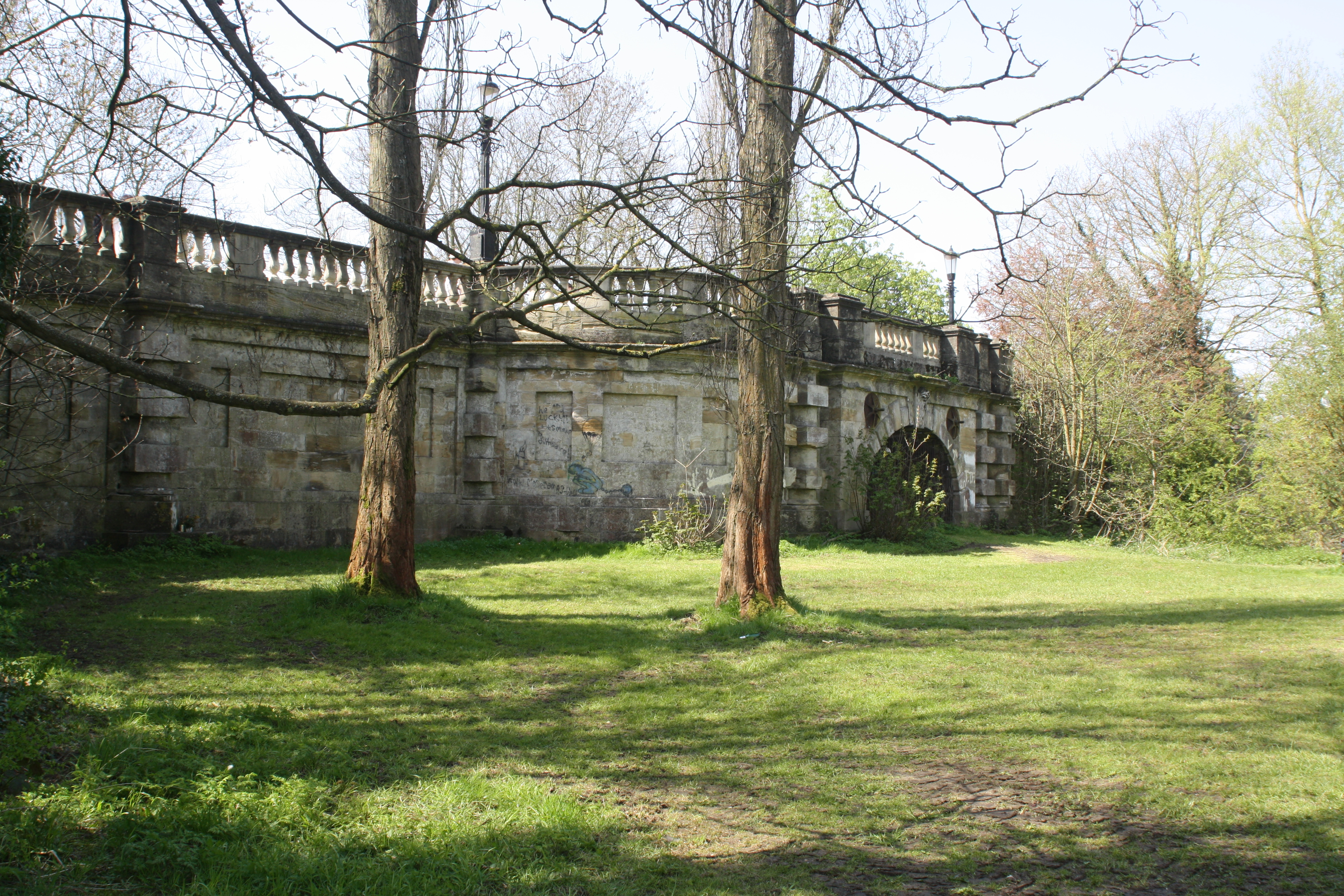
Upstream view of the central area of the bridge, including the elliptical arch.

The present stone bridge was designed by John Gwynn of Shrewsbury with a similar length to the previous one. It has a total of 11 arches of different dimensions distributed as follows. For each of the two branches of the river there are three large semicircular arches plus two smaller ones at each side of the river, originally designed for the towpaths. A central elliptical arch, the only existing in the long central area across the island, completes the structure. This arch only conveys water when the island gets submerged. The original plans of the bridge are in the British Library, 1802 c.17, vol.2, and King's Maps xxxvi, 33 (1).

The bridge, built between 1772 and 1790 by John Randall, originally had a width of 27 feet (8.2 m), which accommodated a single roadway and two pavements. Although the bridge was opened to traffic by the end of 1778, a new scheme for the balustrade and the completion of the south western corner were not finished until 1782 and 1790 respectively.

Gwynn's original design included an extravagant decoration for the balustrade with sculptures and sphinxes that were commissioned to Henry Webber in 1778 but eventually abandoned in 1782. According to Pevsner, the bridge has "good sturdy balusters", although these have been replaced over the years because of degradation due to pollution.

Despite opposition from University members, the bridge was widened in 1882 to accommodate a four-foot gauge track for the tramway. The 18th-century bridge was widened by 20 feet (6.1 m) on the south side, but design was retained.

== May Morning ==
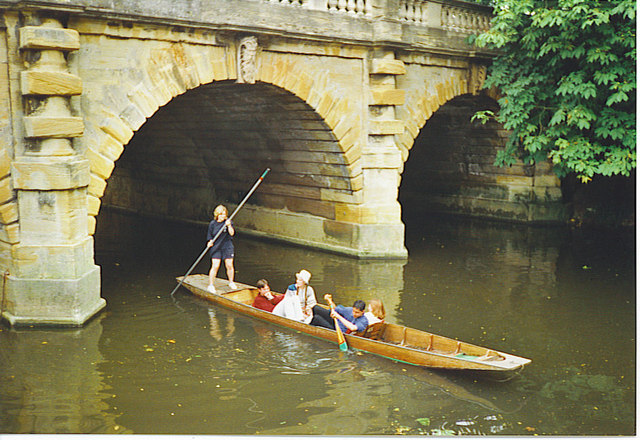
Punting at Magdalen Bridge.

The bridge is the scene of large crowds every 1 May early in the morning for the traditional May Morning celebrations in Oxford. There has been a recent tradition of students to jump off the bridge, despite the danger of injury due to low water levels in the Cherwell. In some years many jumpers have been injured and, in order to avoid this, the bridge is now routinely closed on May Morning.

== Mentions in literature ==
Magdalen Bridge was mentioned by John Betjeman (1906–1984) in his poetry:

The Cherwell carried under Magdalen Bridge
Its leisure puntfuls of the fortunate
Who next term and the next would still some back.

It is also mentioned in the 1911 novel Zuleika Dobson by Max Beerbohm (1872–1956).

It appears briefly in Philip Pullman's The Amber Spyglass, the third volume of Pullman's His Dark Materials trilogy, which has many other scenes set on or around Oxford College.

== Gallery ==
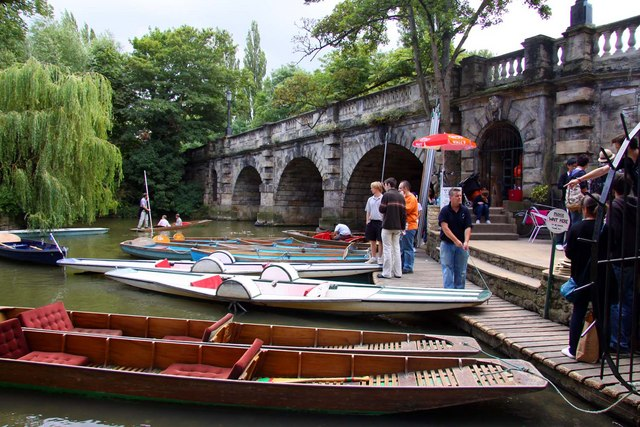
Boat station by Magdalen Bridge.

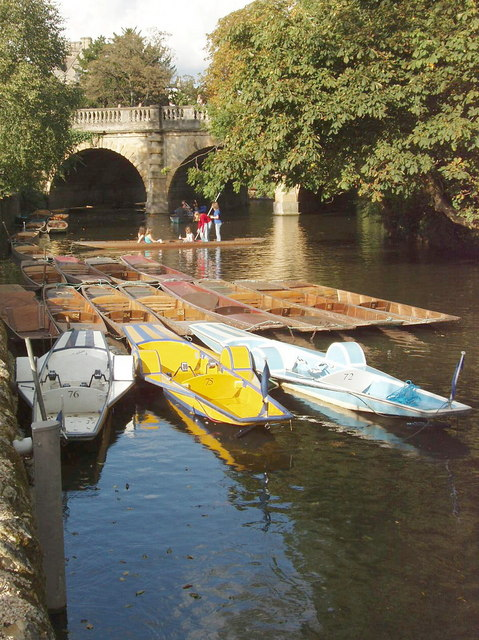
Punts at Magdalen Bridge by the Botanic Gardens.

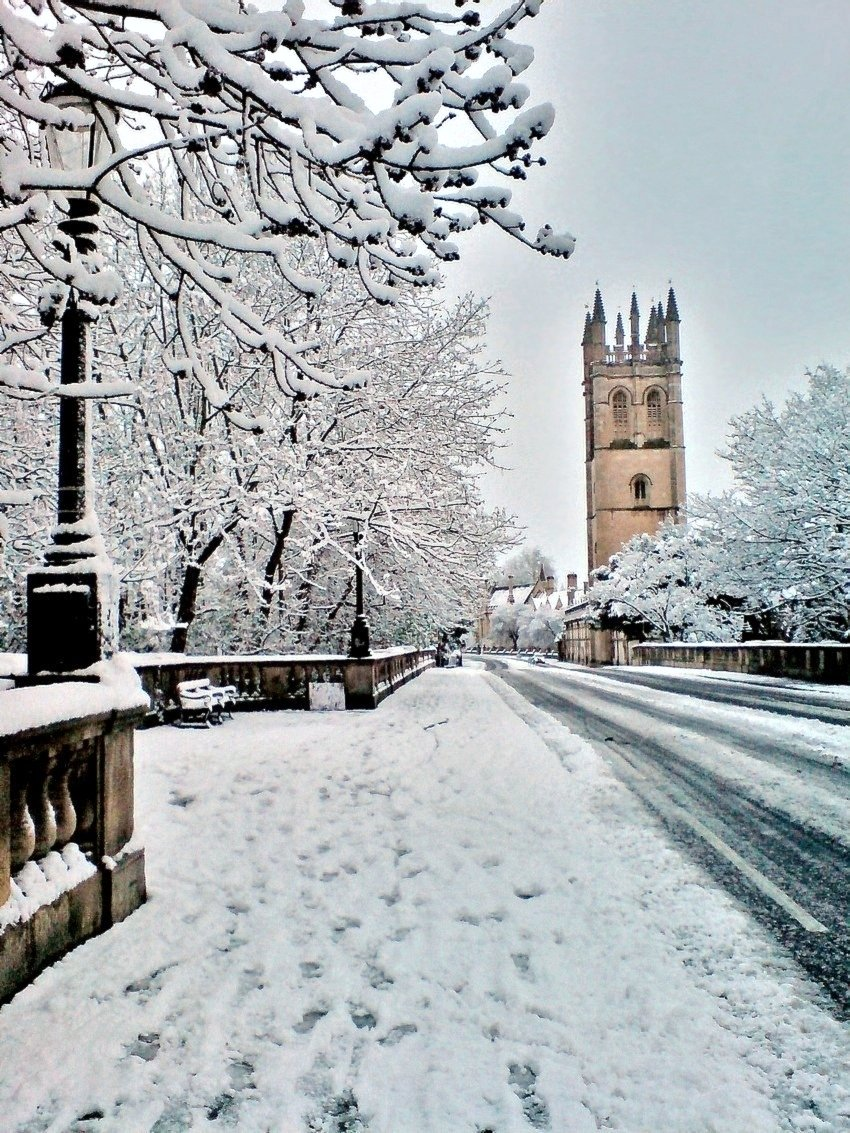
View of Magdalen Bridge in the snow.

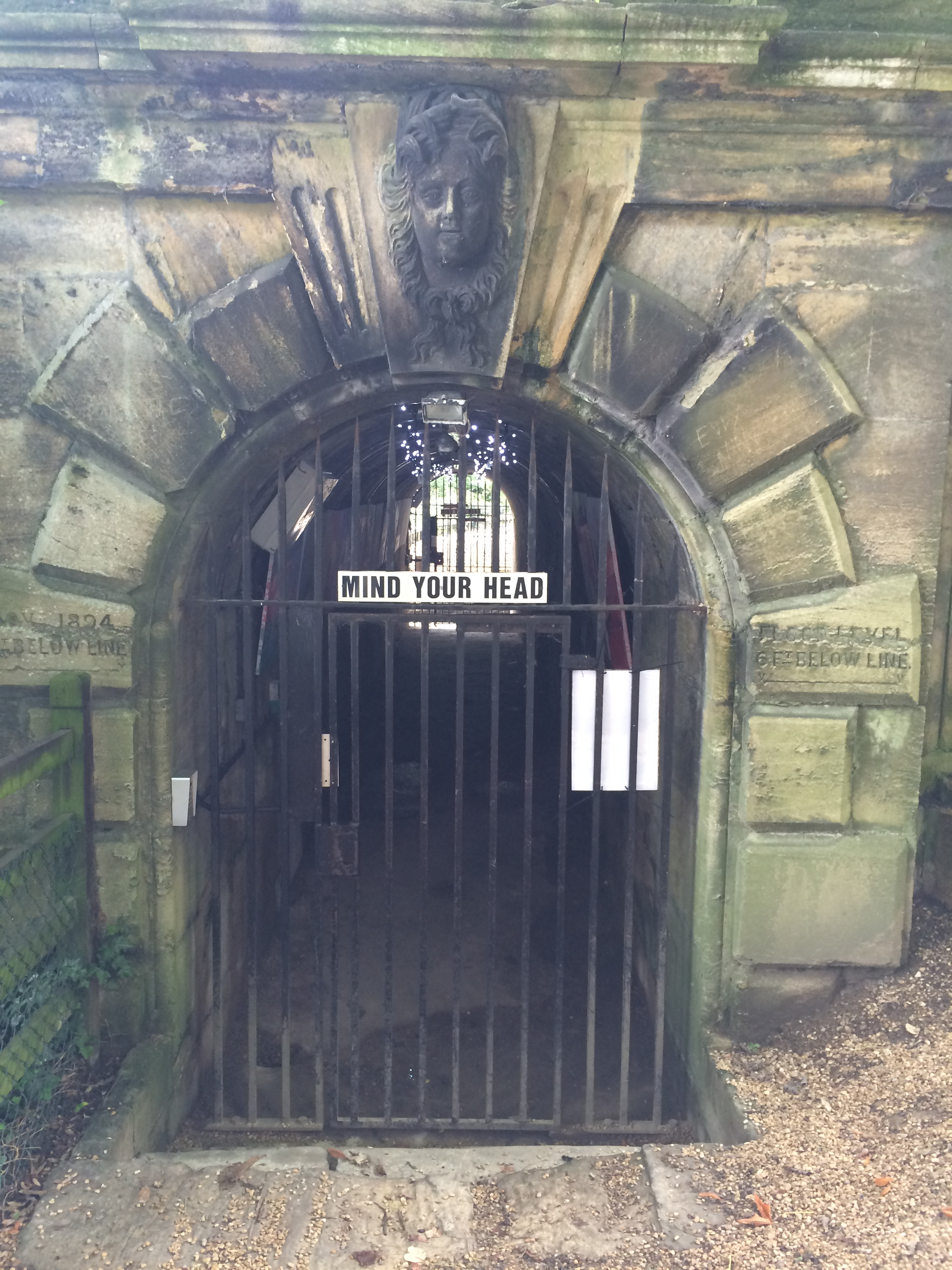
Choristers' tunnel under Magdalen Bridge running from Magdalen College School to the Waynflete Building of Magdalen College.
