= Now Is the Month of Maying =

Song composed by Thomas Morley

Composition
- Published: 1595
- Composer(s): Thomas Morley
- Lyricist(s): based on Orazio Vecchi

"Now is the month of maying" is one of the most famous of the English balletts (a light dancelike part song similar to a madrigal, frequently with a 'fa-la-la' chorus). It was written by Thomas Morley and published in 1595. It is based on the canzonet So ben mi ch'a bon tempo used by Orazio Vecchi in his 1590 Selva di varia ricreatione. It was printed in Thomas Morley's First Book of Ballets to Five Voyces (1595).

The song delights in bawdy double-entendre. It is apparently about spring dancing, but this is a metaphor for making love/having sex. For example, a "barley-break" would have suggested outdoor sexual activity (akin to "roll in the hay"). The use of such imagery and puns increased during the Renaissance.

The ballett forms a key part of Oxford's May Morning celebrations, where the choir of Magdalen College sing the verses from the roof of the college's Great Tower. It was also heard in 1964 on The Andy Griffith Show episode "The Song Festers".

Now is the month of maying,
When merry lads are playing,
Fa la la la la la la la la,
Fa la la la la la la lah.
Each with his bonny lass
Upon the greeny grass.
Fa la la la la la la la la, etc...

The Spring, clad all in gladness,
Doth laugh at Winter's sadness,
Fa la la, etc...
And to the bagpipe's sound
The nymphs tread out their ground.
Fa la la, etc...

Fie then! why sit we musing,
Youth's sweet delight refusing?
Fa la la, etc...
Say, dainty nymphs, and speak,
Shall we play barley break?
Fa la la etc...
