= May Morning =

Annual event in Oxford

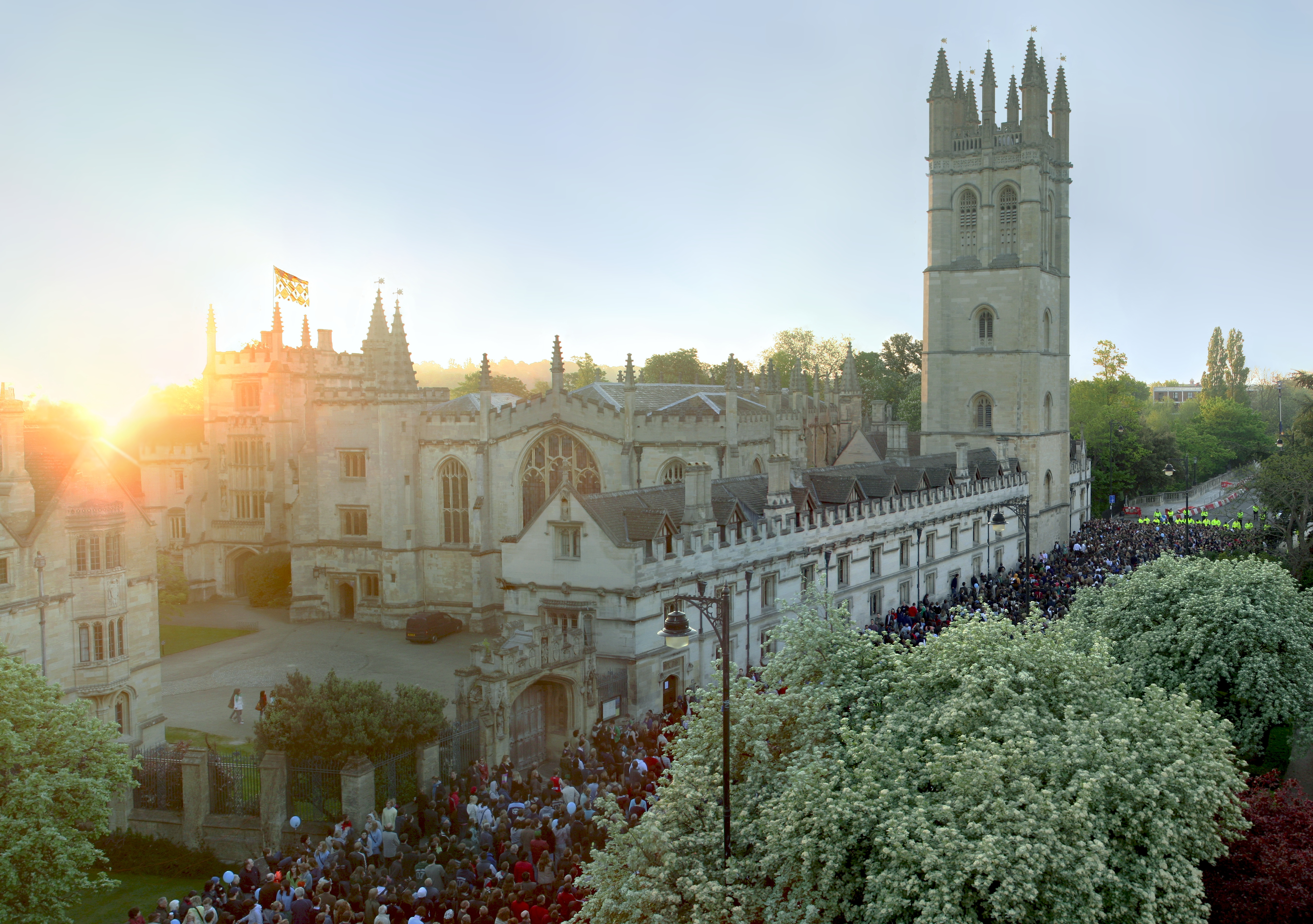
Magdalen College, Oxford, on May Morning, 2007

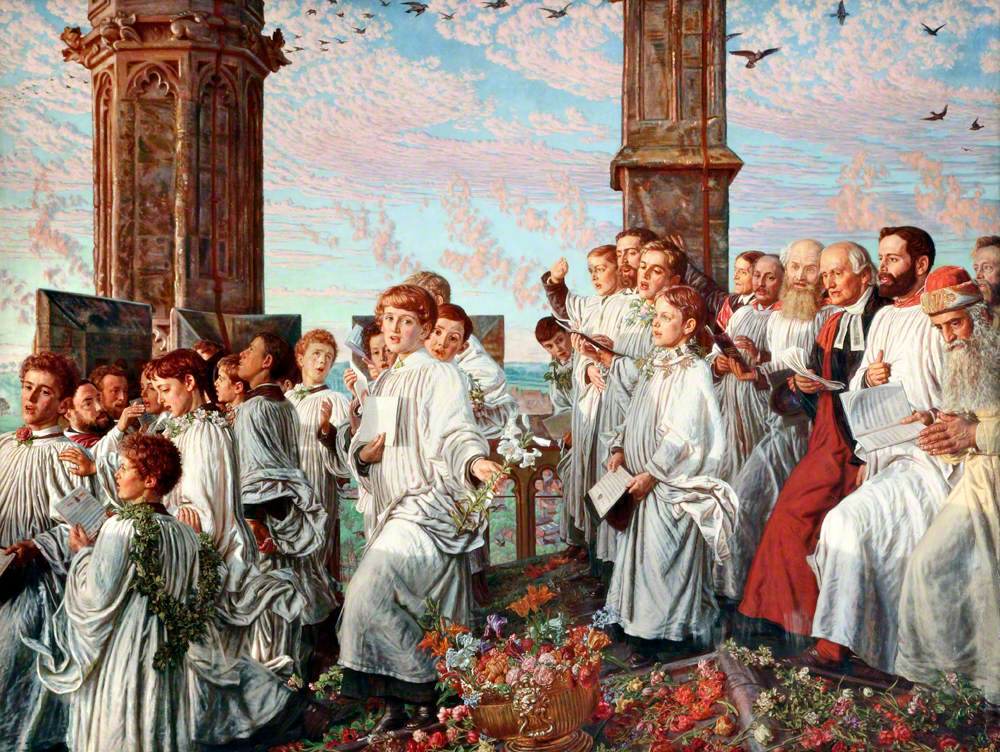
May Morning on Magdalen Tower (1890) by William Holman Hunt

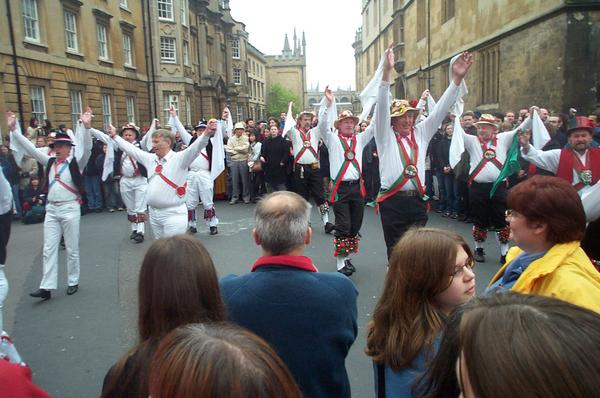
Morris dancing on May Morning, Oxford 2004.

May Morning is an annual event in Oxford, United Kingdom, on May Day (1 May).

== Event ==
The event starts early at 6 a.m., though the festivities themselves begin much earlier with some people even starting late on April 30, with the Magdalen College Choir singing a hymn, the Hymnus Eucharisticus, from the top of Magdalen Tower. The choir traditionally also sings a madrigal, Now Is the Month of Maying, following prayers for the city led by the Dean of Divinity. Large crowds of both students and Oxford residents normally gather under the tower, along the High Street, and on Magdalen Bridge. Students and fellows of Magdalen College gather in the college cloisters and on top of the other towers within the college grounds. In 2017 the event took place during the Bank Holiday weekend, and a record 27,000 people gathered to hear Sol Samba. During the 2020 Coronavirus pandemic the event was cancelled, however the choir recorded a 'Virtual May Morning', originally broadcast live.

This is then followed by general revelry and festivities, including Morris dancing in Radcliffe Square between the University Church and the Radcliffe Camera, impromptu music, etc., for a couple of hours from around 6.15 am onwards. There is a party atmosphere, despite the early hour. In fact, in some years there are all-night balls the night before, so some people, especially students, are in formal attire.

There is a modern tradition of students jumping from Magdalen Bridge. This occurred sporadically in the 1960s, becoming an annual event by the 1980s. However, the river is sometimes shallow, which has on occasion caused serious injury, notably in 1997 when one person was left paralyzed, and 2005 when ten were hospitalised. Hence, the bridge was closed every May Morning during 1998–2001 and 2006–2009.

In the 19th century, the young townsmen blew horns and ran riot after the singing. Activities have varied over the previous centuries. Vera Brittain wrote a poem with the title May Morning in 1916. The first ten lines depict the actual event. One fictional description of the Tudor May Morning is in "Towers in the Mist" by Elizabeth Goudge. Another description is found in the film Shadowlands directed by Richard Attenborough, on an episode in the life of the English scholar, writer, and fellow of Magdalen's C. S. Lewis, starring Anthony Hopkins as C. S. Lewis and Debra Winger as Joy Davidman, and including footage from the 1993 May Morning celebrations.

During the COVID-19 lockdowns, May Morning was hosted online in 2020 and 2021. After two years of lockdown, May Morning began once more in earnest in 2022. Approximately 12,500 people crowded the streets to welcome the return of the festivities.

== See also ==
- English traditions on May Day
- The Oxcentrics, a jazz band that played on May Mornings in the 1970s
