= Magdalen Tower =

Bell tower at Magdalen College, Oxford

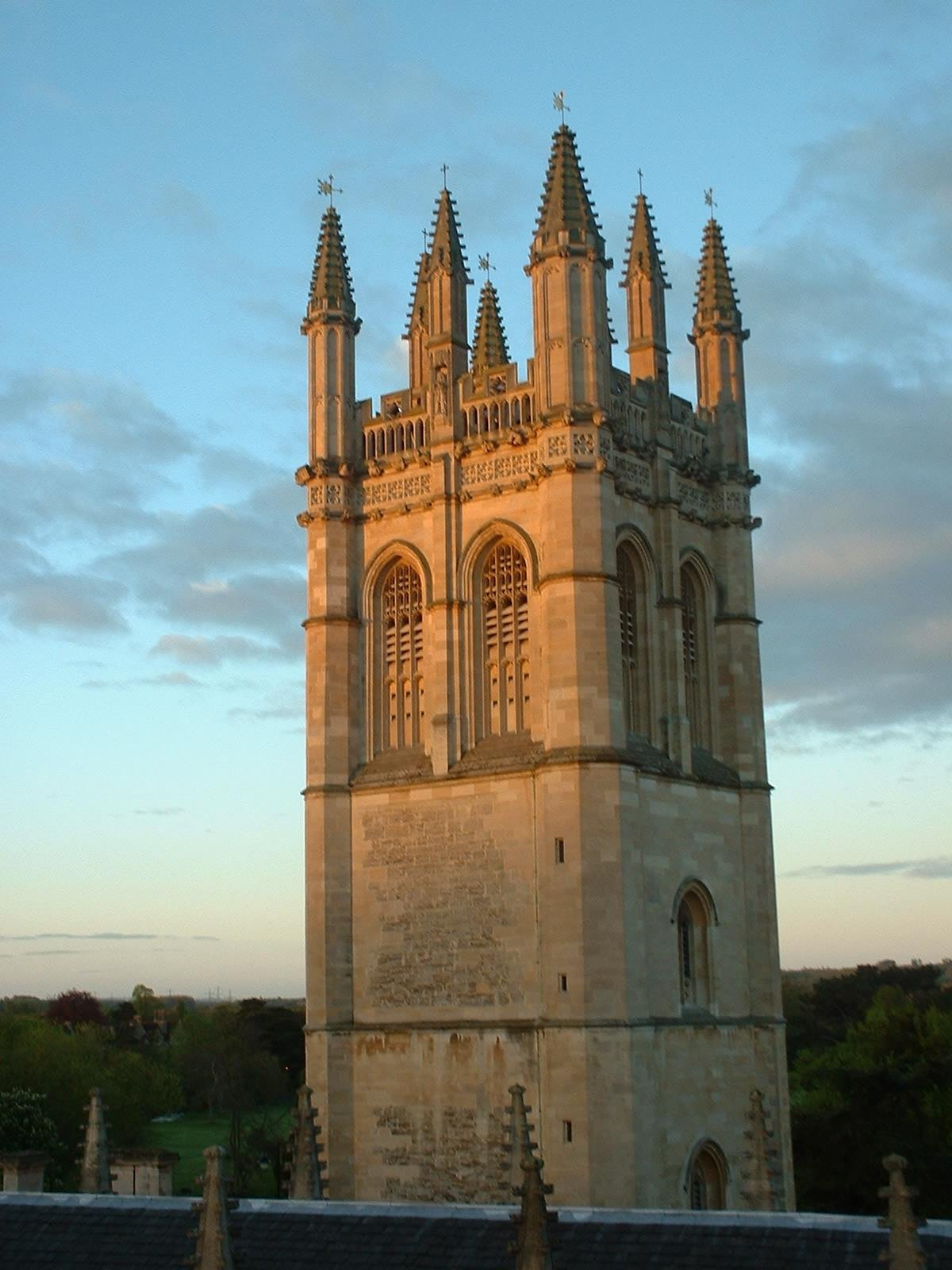
- Magdalen Tower, as seen from the nearby Founders Tower
- Interactive map of the Magdalen Tower area

General information
- Type: Tower
- Architectural style: Gothic
- Location: Magdalen College, High Street, Oxford, United Kingdom
- Coordinates: 51.75165°N 1.24683°W
- Year built: 1492–1509
- Construction started: 1492
- Completed: 1509
- Inaugurated: 9 August 1509
- Renovated: 1976–1981
- Owner: Magdalen College, Oxford

Height
- Height: 144 feet (44 m)

Technical details
- Material: Stone
- Floor count: 4
- Location of Magdalen Tower within central Oxford

Magdalen Tower, completed in 1509, is a bell tower that forms part of Magdalen College, Oxford. It is a central focus for the celebrations in Oxford on May Morning.

== History ==
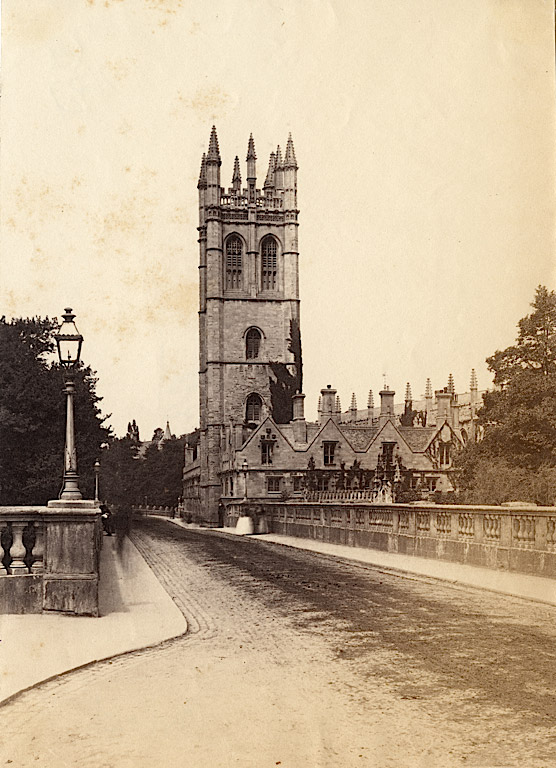
Magdalen College Bell Tower, Oxford, England (detail), 1850s, albumen print, Department of Image Collections, National Gallery of Art Library, Washington, DC

Magdalen Tower is one of the oldest parts of Magdalen College, Oxford, situated directly on the High Street. Built of stone from 1492, when the foundation stone was laid by Dr Richard Mayew, the College President, on 9 August. The tower's bells hung ready for use in 1505, and it was completed by 1509. The tower is a prominent element of the historic central Oxford skyline. At 144 feet (44 m) high, it is the tallest building in Oxford. It dominates the eastern entrance to the city, towering over Magdalen Bridge and with good views from the Botanic Garden opposite.

The tower, joined to the south range of college buildings, is built in four storeys of unequal height. Octagonal turrets encase the corners; the slightly larger northwest turret encloses the spiral stair, lit by slit windows. The basement is windowless; the second and third stages have small windows in three sides; the fourth, principal storey is loftier, with a double window on each face divided by a buttress rising through the panelled frieze and mock battlements, where it is surmounted by a figure in a niche crowned by a pinnacle slightly smaller than the four pinnacles that crown the corners.

The tower contains a peal of ten bells hung for English change ringing. They were cast at a number of different foundries and the heaviest, weighing 17 cwt, was cast in 1623. The bells are rung on many occasions during the year by the Oxford Society of Change Ringers at the invitation of the college. Such occasions include significant royal and college anniversaries, and after some services in the College Chapel. The bells received their last major overhaul in 2012, being returned to the tower in March of that year.

Extensive restoration to the stone facing of the tower was undertaken during 1976 to 1981, since pollution had badly degraded the stonework.

Members of Magdalen College can procure the 10" iron key to the door at its base from the porter's lodge.

== May Morning ==
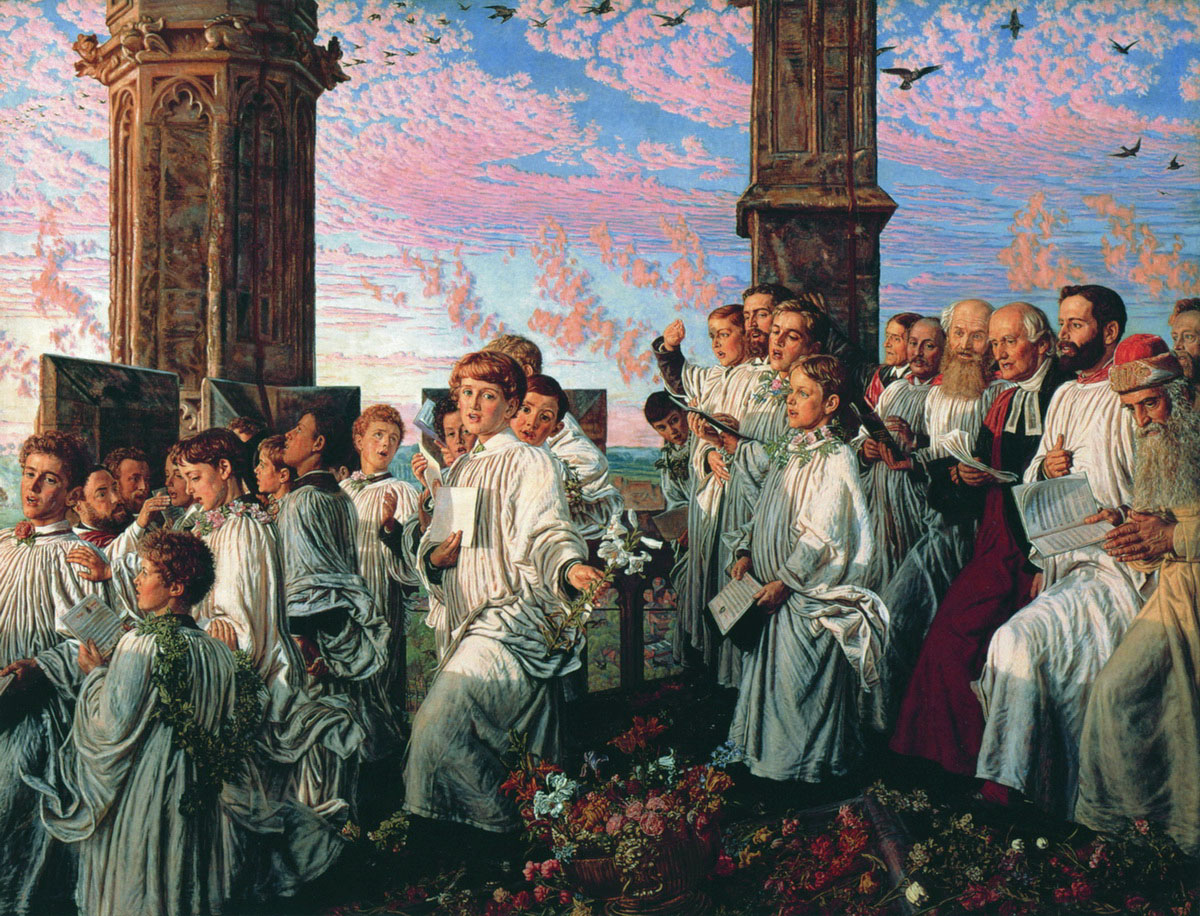
May Morning on Magdalen Tower by William Holman Hunt (1890). Lady Lever Art Gallery, Liverpool

Every 1st May, at 6am, the choir of the college (including boy choristers from nearby Magdalen College School) sings two traditional hymns – the Hymnus Eucharisticus and "Now Is the Month of Maying" – to start the May Morning celebrations in Oxford. Large crowds gather in the High Street and on Magdalen Bridge below to listen, before dispersing for other activities such as Morris Dancing. The ceremony is the subject of William Holman Hunt's 1890 Pre-Raphaelite painting May Morning on Magdalen Tower. on display at the Lady Lever Art Gallery in Liverpool.

== In literature ==
- In the novel Babel, or the Necessity of Violence by R. F. Kuang, Magdalen Tower collapses in an alternate history of the 19th Century.

== See also ==
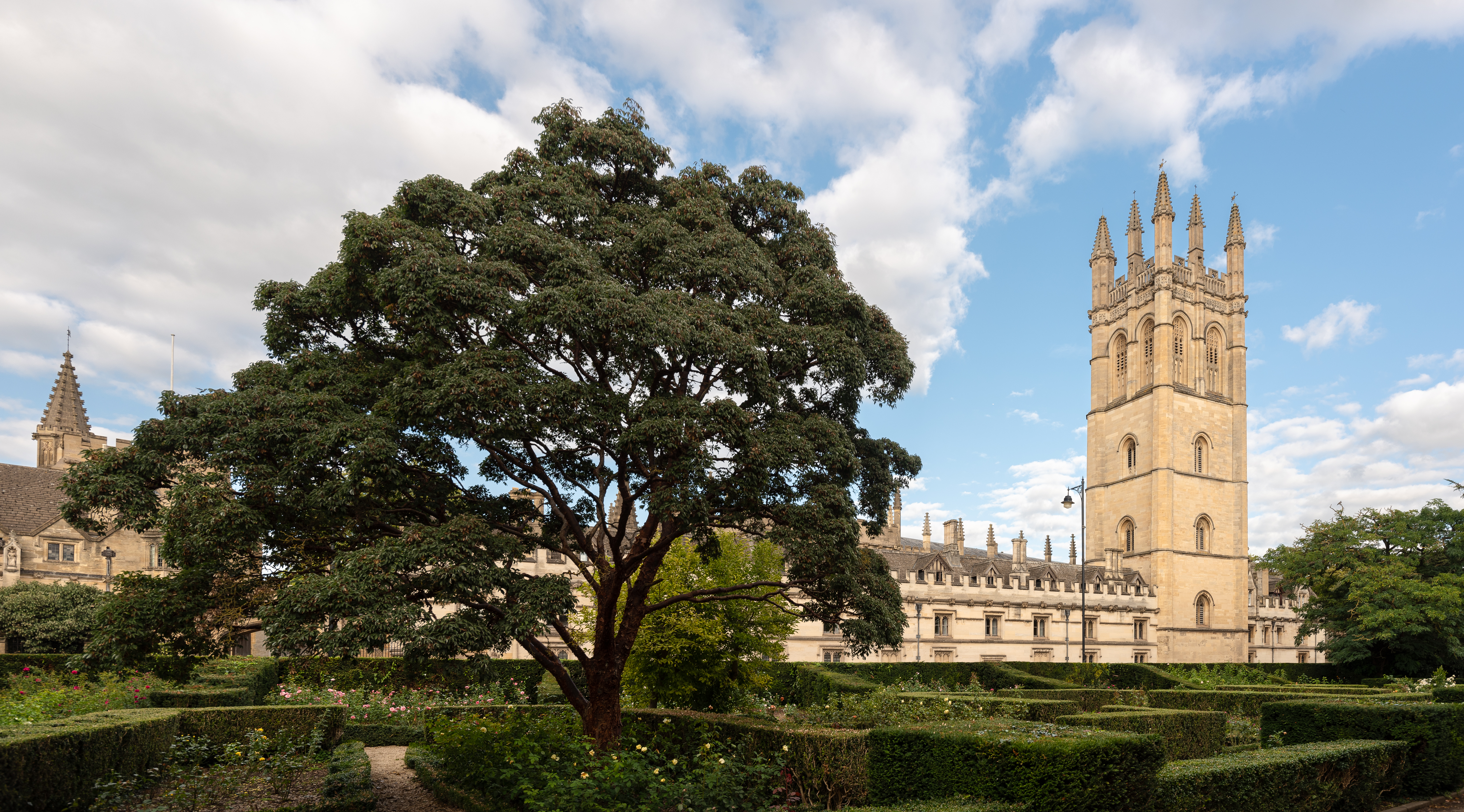
Magdalen Tower, as seen from the Oxford Botanic Garden

- Founders Tower, Magdalen College
- Tom Tower at Christ Church, Oxford

== Bibliography ==
- Jennifer Sherwood and Nikolaus Pevsner, The Buildings of England: Oxfordshire. ISBN 0-14-071045-0.
