= Lady Lever Art Gallery =

Art museum in Wirral, England

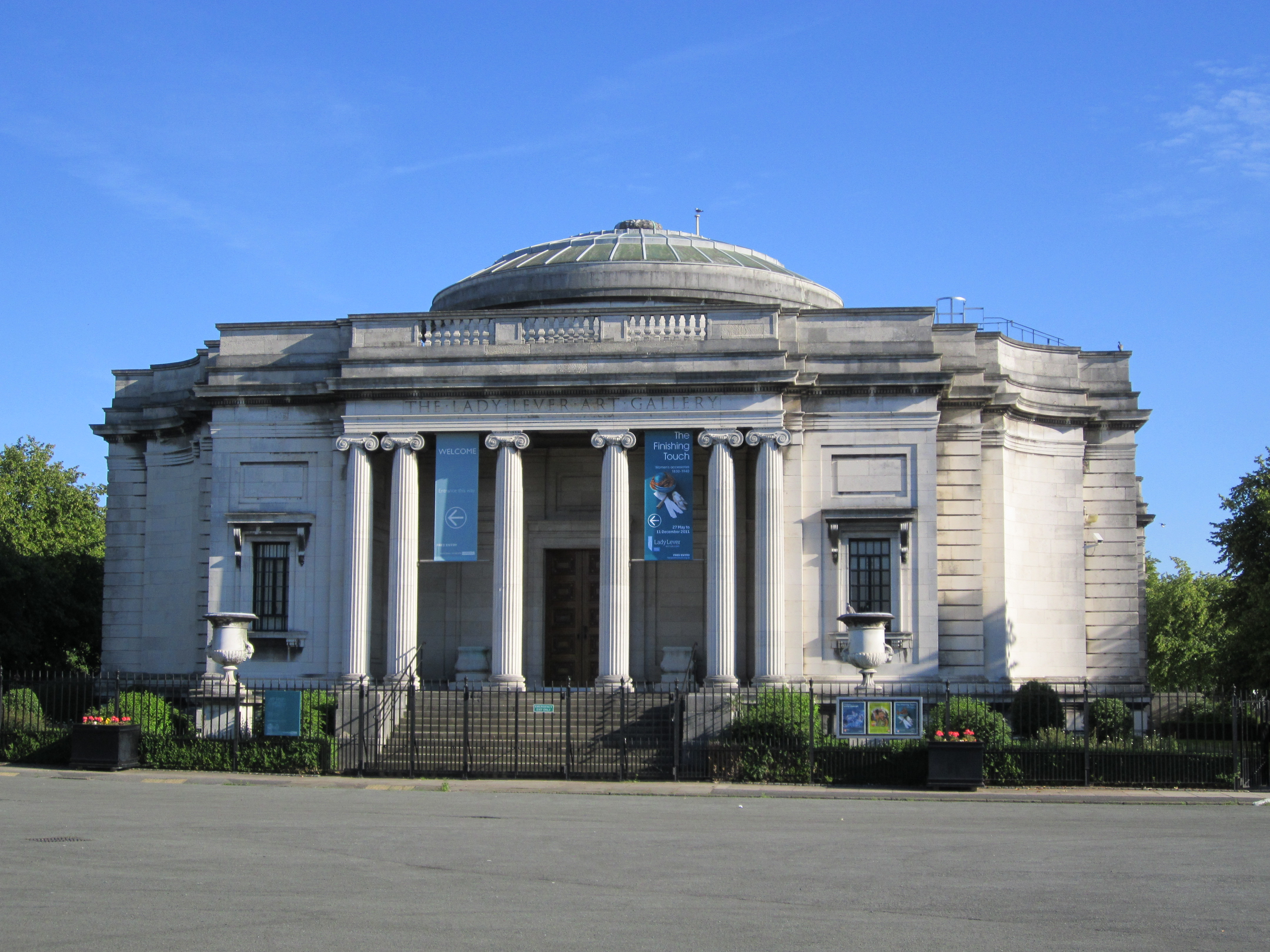
- Lady Lever Art Gallery Building
- Established: 1922
- Location: Port Sunlight, Merseyside, England, United Kingdom
- Coordinates: 53°21′21″N 2°59′58″W
- Visitors: 210,790 (2019)
- Website: www.liverpoolmuseums.org.uk

The Lady Lever Art Gallery is a museum founded and built by the industrialist and philanthropist William Lever, 1st Viscount Leverhulme and opened in 1922. The Lady Lever Art Gallery is set in the garden village of Port Sunlight, on the Wirral and one of the National Museums Liverpool.

The museum is a significant surviving example of late Victorian and Edwardian taste. It houses major collections of fine and decorative art that are an expression of Lord Leverhulme's personal taste and collecting interests. The collection is strong in British 19th-century painting and sculpture, spilling over to include late 18th-century and early 20th works. There are important collections of English furniture, Wedgwood, especially jasperware, and Chinese ceramics, and smaller groups of other types of objects, such as Ancient Greek vases and Roman sculpture. The majority of objects were part of the original donation, but the collection has continued to expand at a modest rate. The museum displays mostly mixed paintings, sculpture and furniture together, and there are five period rooms recreating typical period interiors from large houses.

== History ==
Lever began collecting art in the late 19th century, largely to use in advertising for the popular Sunlight Soap brand (manufactured a few minutes' walk from the gallery) that helped to create his fortune. As he grew richer his collections began to expand, his confidence grew as well and he developed a taste for collecting. He mostly collected British art, but he was also fascinated by Chinese art, Roman sculpture and Greek vases, which he had chosen to collect to show styles that had influenced British artists in the eighteenth and the nineteenth centuries.

He endowed the gallery to showcase his collection. It is named in memory of his wife Elizabeth Hulme (Lady Lever) who had died in 1913.

== The building ==
Commissioned in 1913 from architects William and Segar Owen, the Lady Lever Art Gallery was built in the Beaux-Arts style. The building was opened in 1922 by Princess Beatrice, the youngest daughter of Queen Victoria.

In 2015 a touring exhibition visited museums in Japan and elsewhere. The redeveloped South End galleries were restored to their original architecture style as part of a £2.8 million restoration project in 2016. The work included opening up original doorways to increase the circulation of visitors, improving the lighting and restoring some of the original vaulted ceilings.

Gallery Rooms

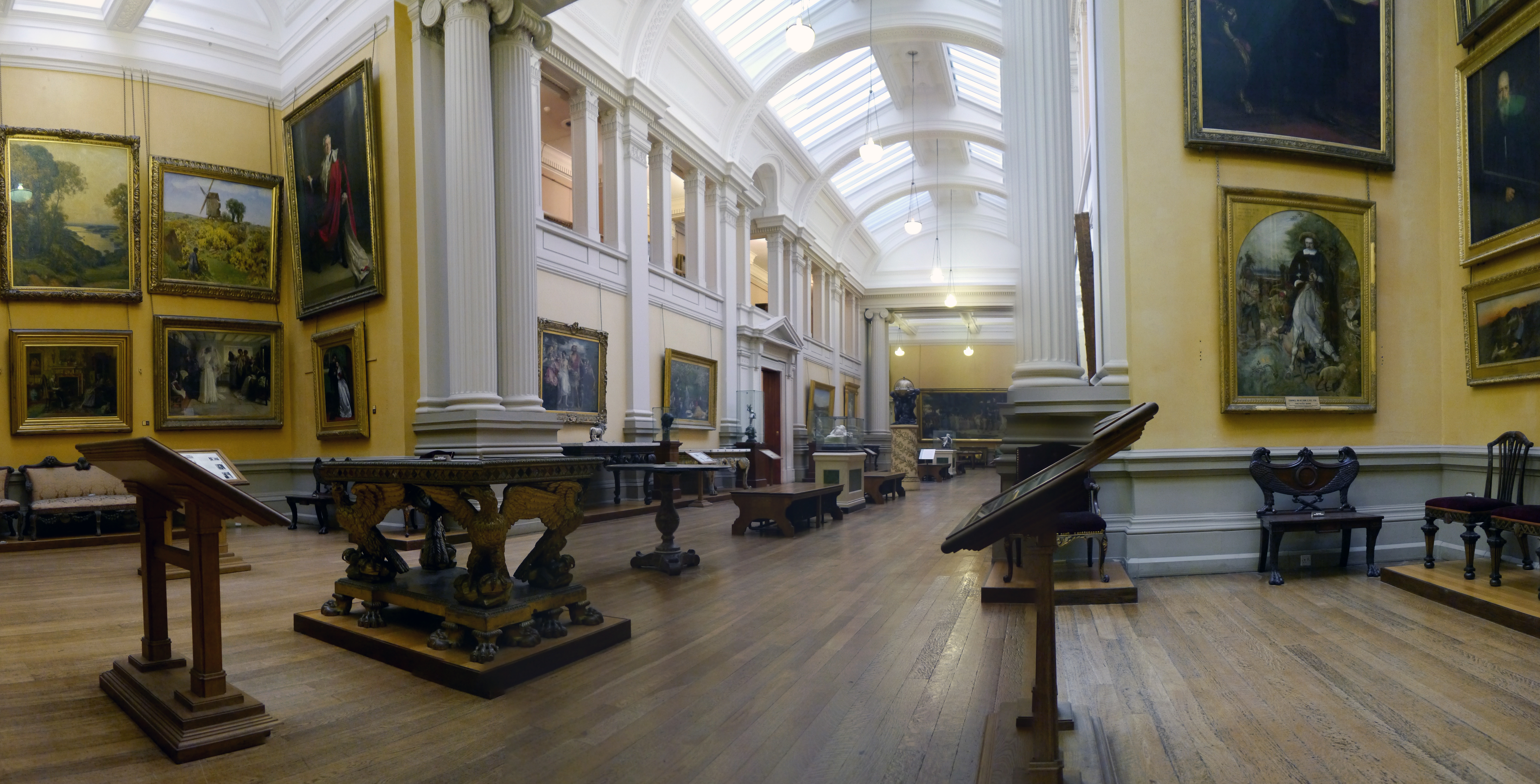
Main Hall

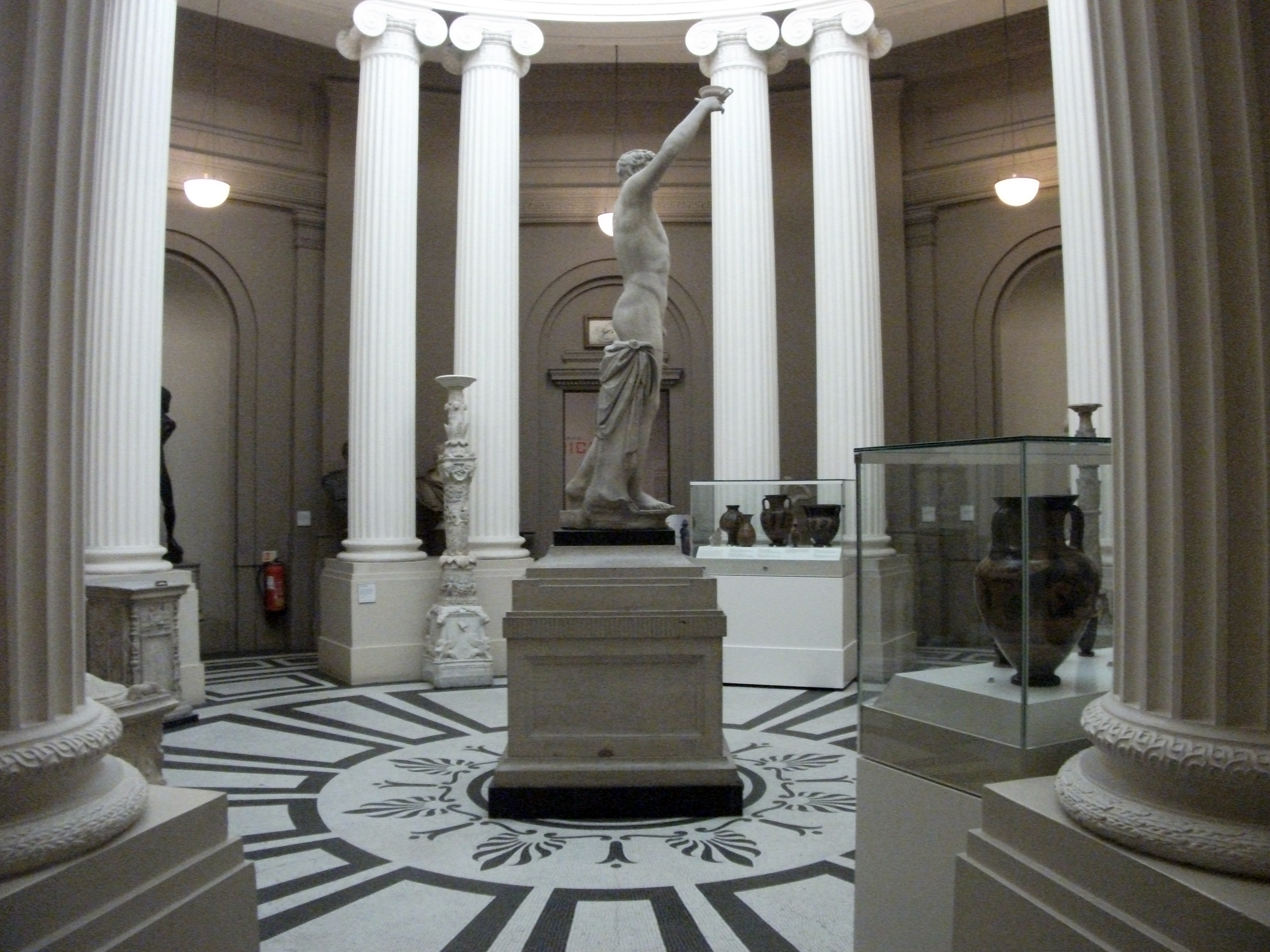
Room 19, Classical and 18th century sculpture, Greek pottery

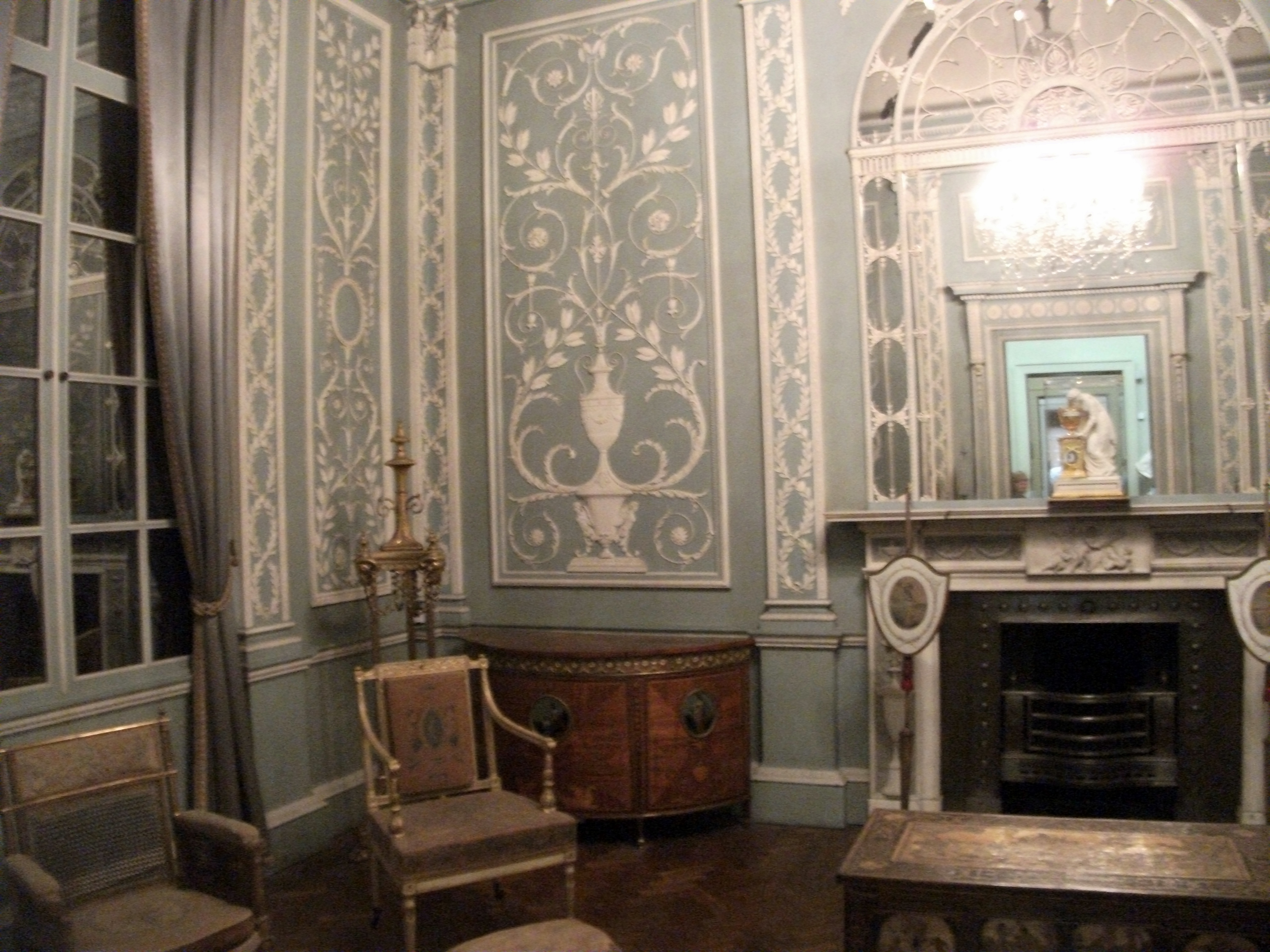
Room 21, Adam room

== Collection ==
The Gallery has a good representation of several trends in Victorian painting, including the Pre-Raphaelites, both during the period of the Brotherhood and in their subsequent careers. Concern with social conditions, classical revivalism, and later historical painting are all represented. There are important works by Millais, Ford Madox Brown, William Holman Hunt, Dante Gabriel Rossetti, Edward Burne-Jones, Lord Leighton, and many others. The museum has what appears to be the largest display in any museum of paintings by William Etty. Earlier works include those by Turner, Constable, Gainsborough and Reynolds.

Much of the Wedgwood collection was from the collection of Dudley Marjoribanks, 1st Baron Tweedmouth, bought in 1905. This, in turn, was partly formed from the collection of Charles Darwin, Josiah Wedgwood's grandson. It is probably the best collection of jasperware in the world.

The collection includes several examples of New Sculpture, including works by Edward Onslow Ford, John Gibson, William Goscombe John, and F. W. Pomeroy.

== Gallery of works of art in the collection ==
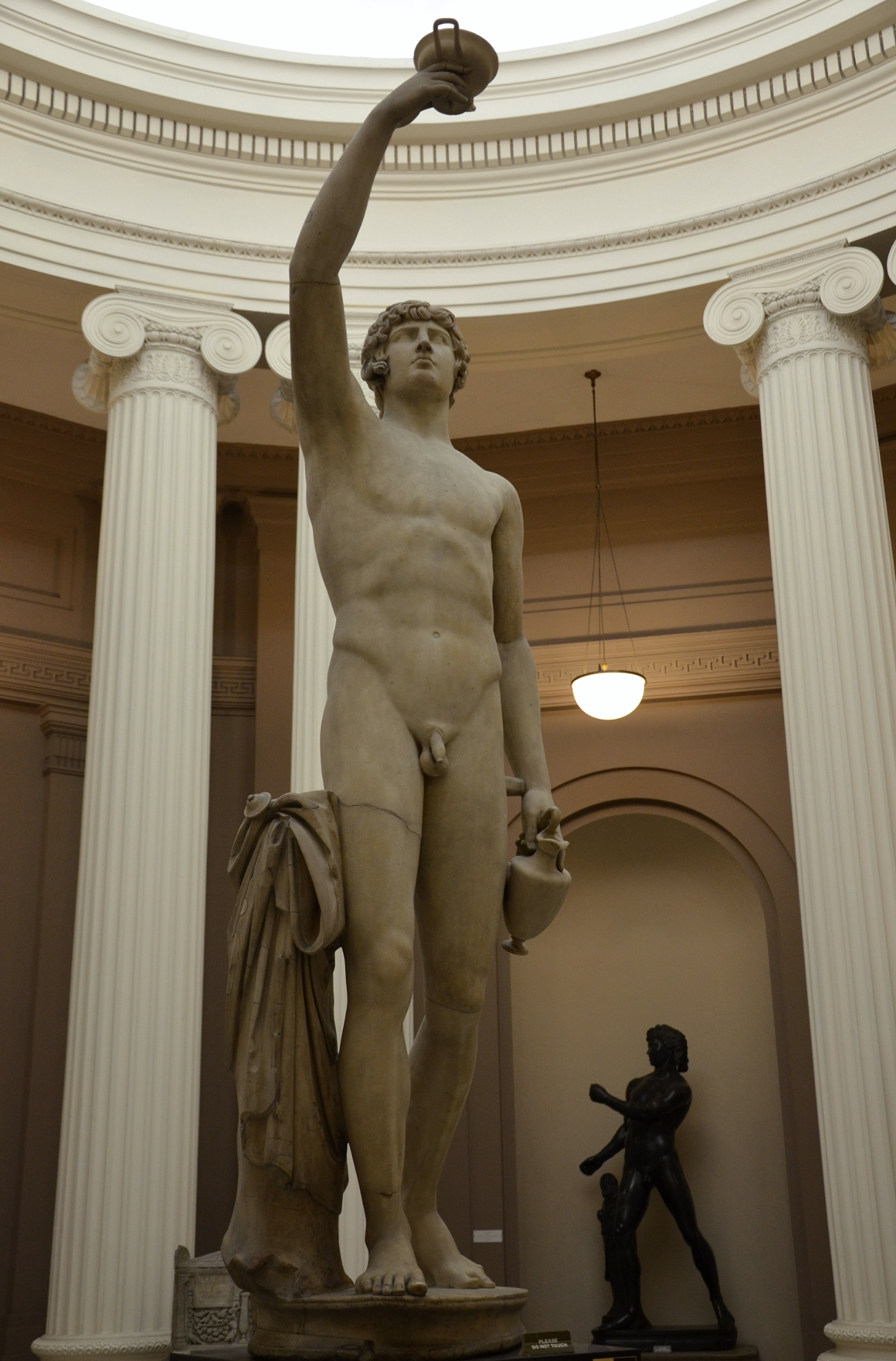
Antinous
circa 130–138
restored (circa 1795) as Ganymede

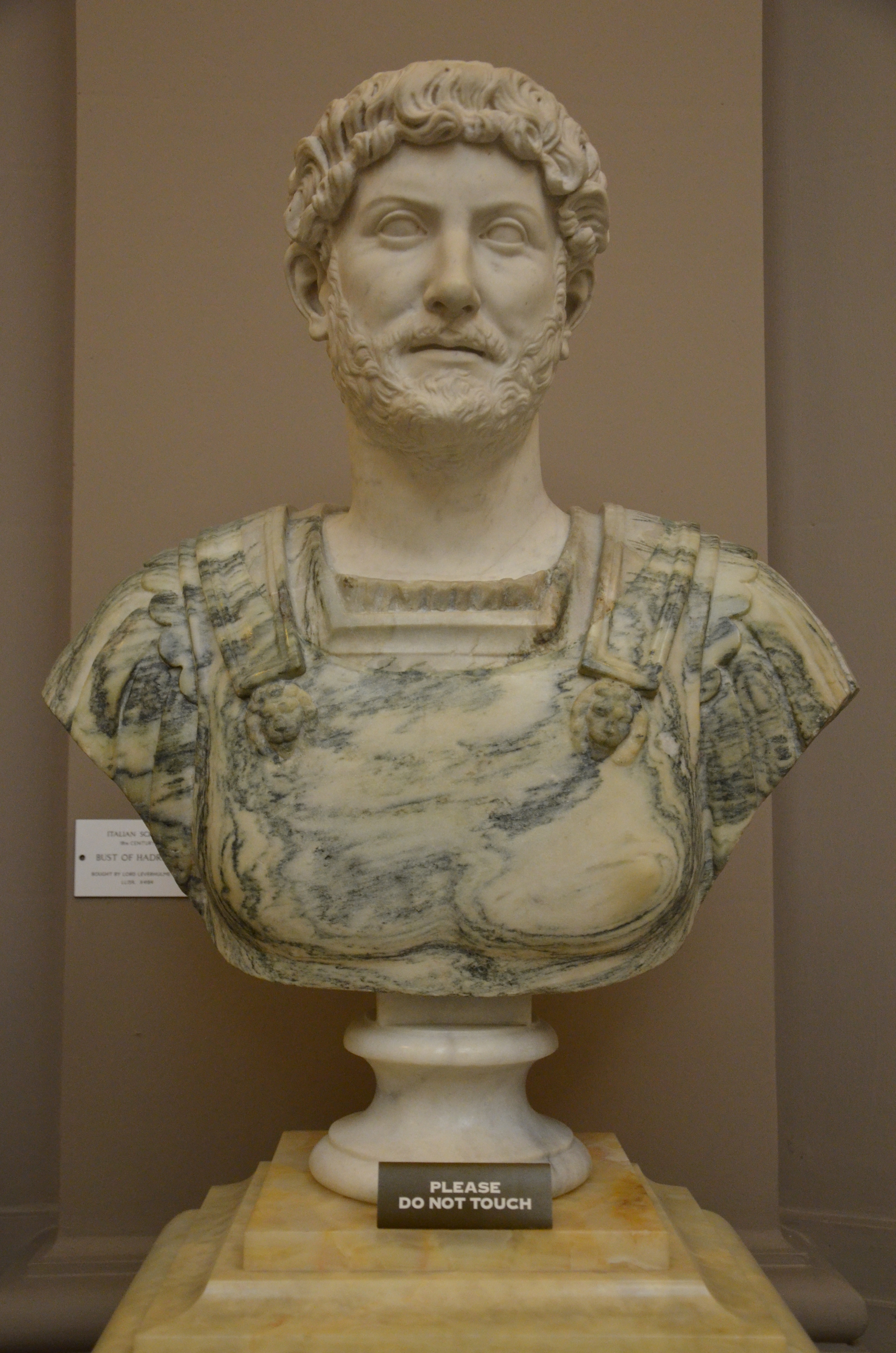
Emperor Hadrian
18th century

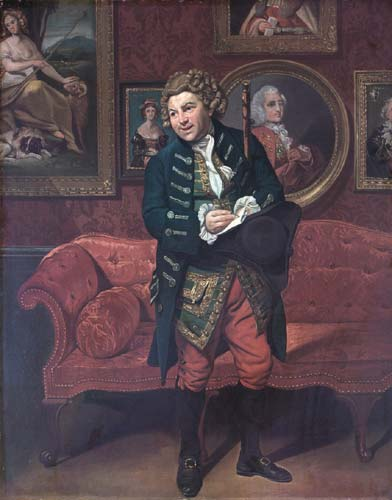
Johan Zoffany
Robert Baddeley as Moses in Sheridan's 'The School for Scandal'
1781

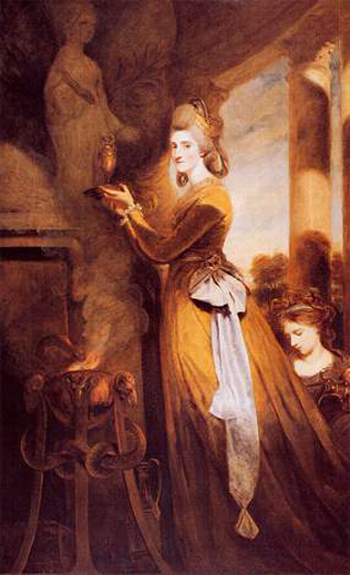
Joshua Reynolds
Mrs. Peter Beckford
1782

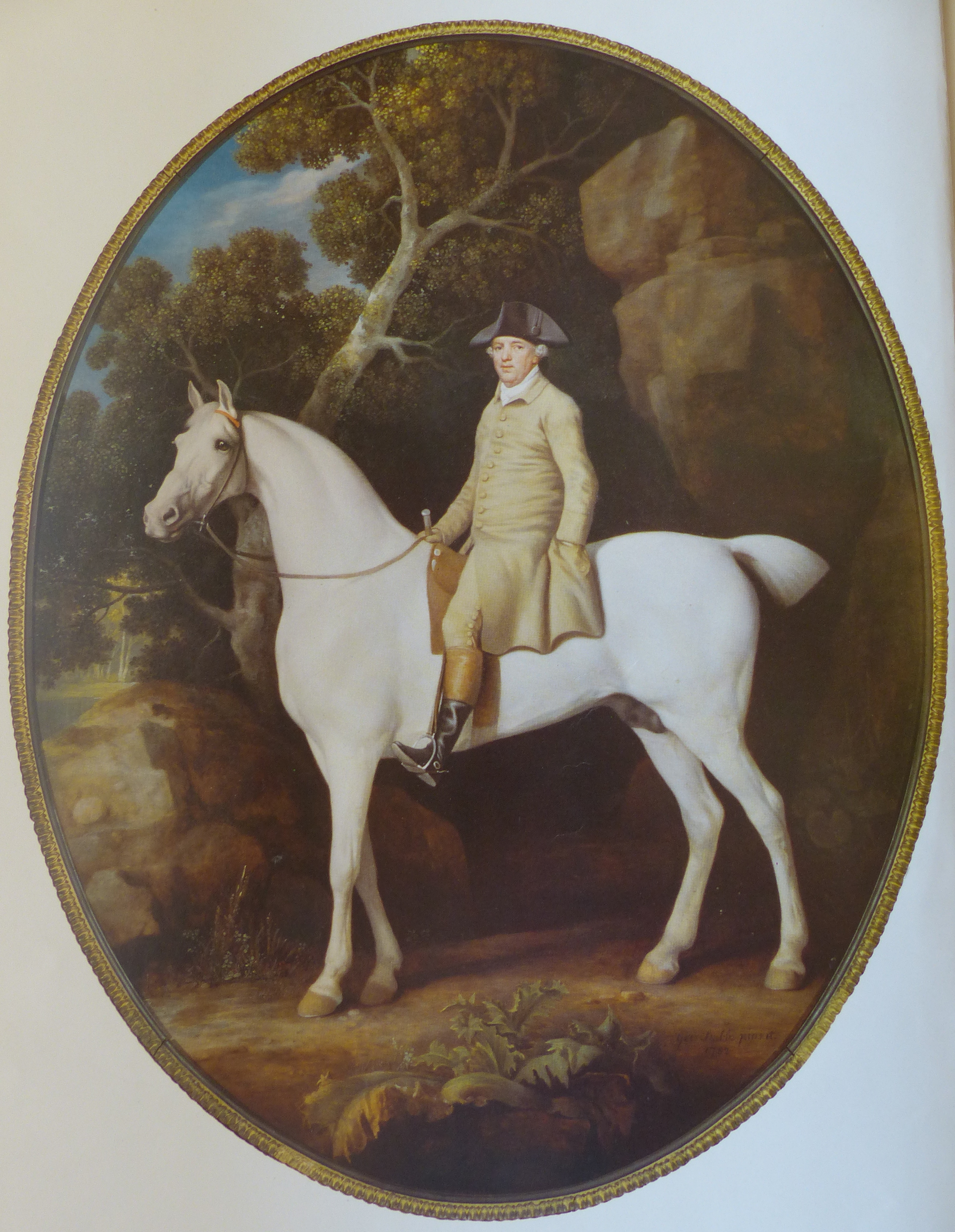
George Stubbs
Selfportrait on Horseback
1783

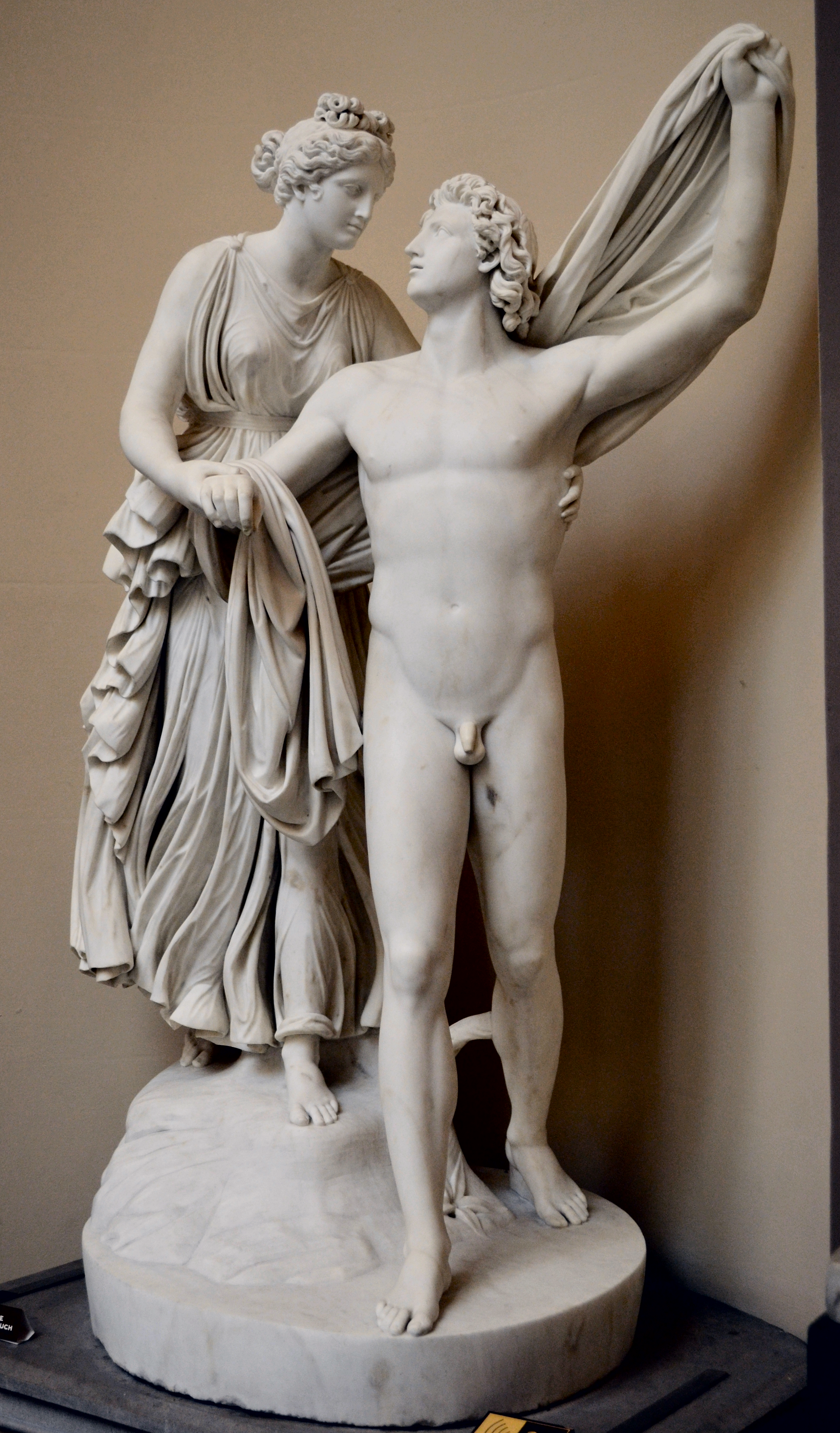
John Flaxman
Cephalus and Aurora
1789

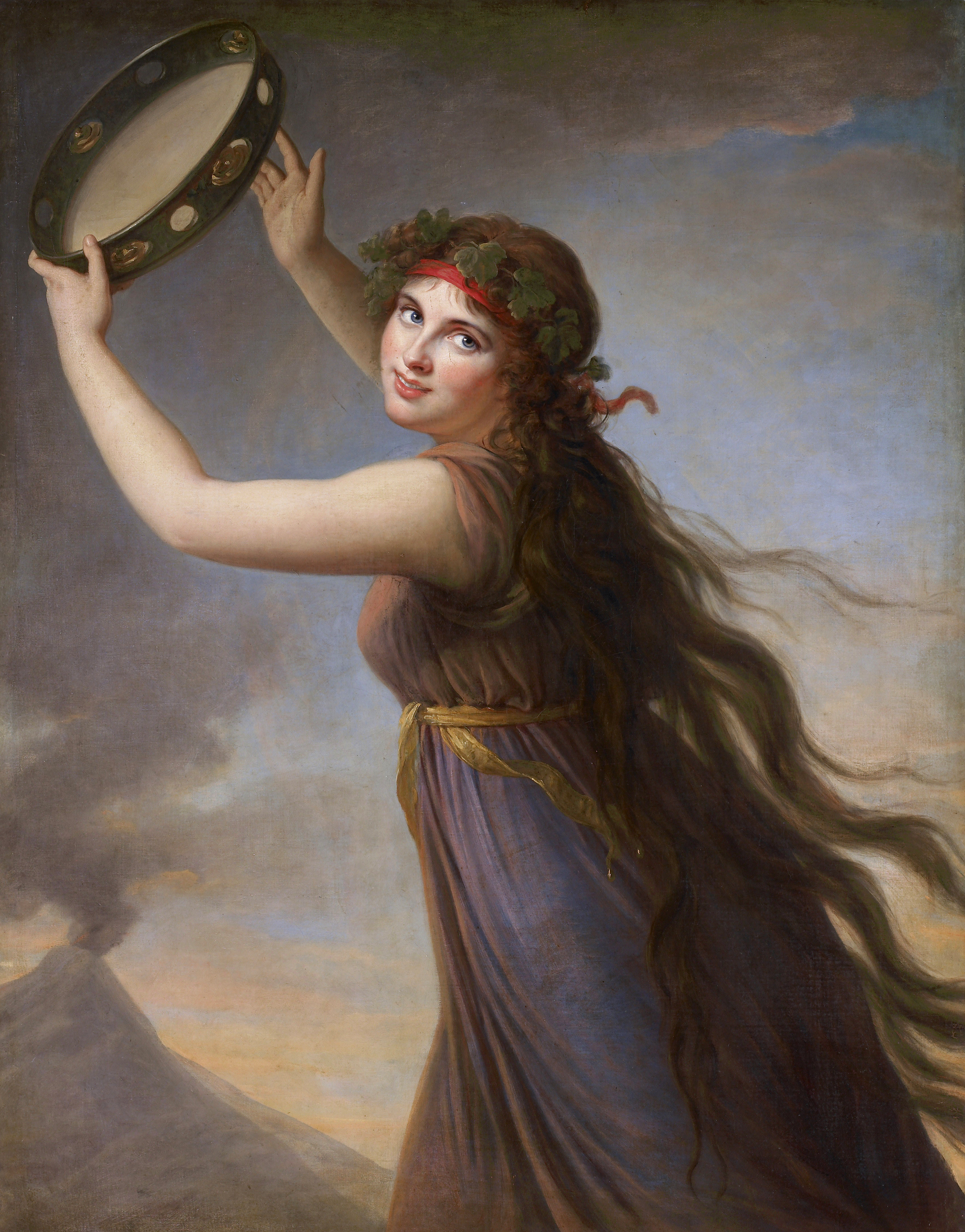
Élisabeth Vigée Le Brun
Lady Hamilton as a Bacchante
circa 1790

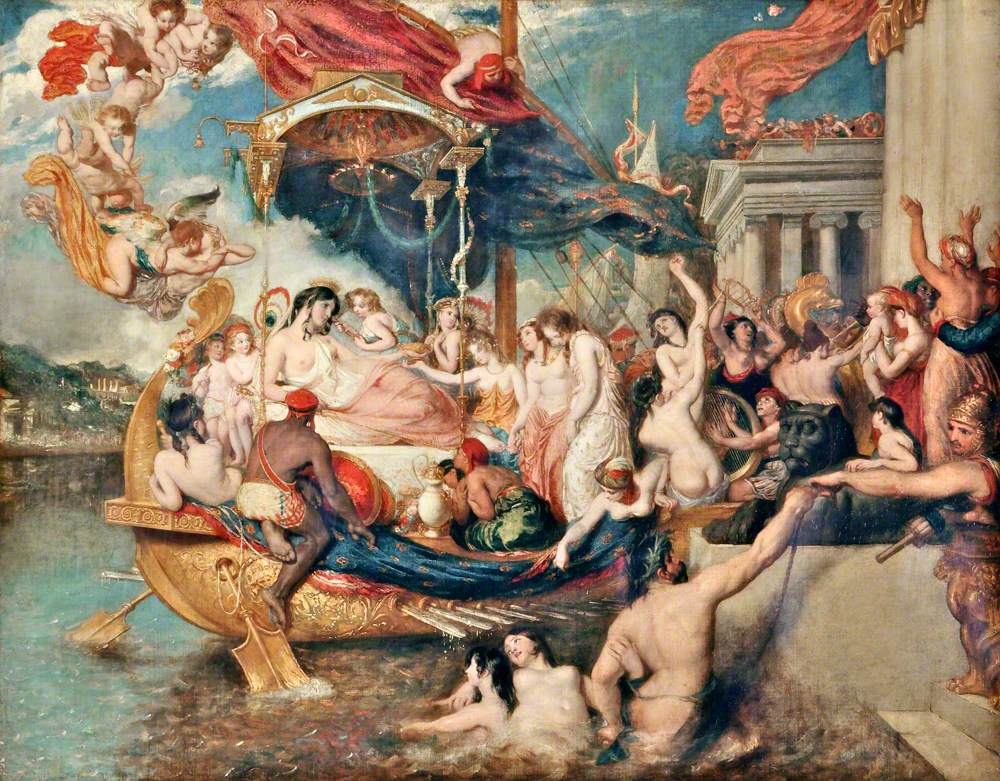
William Etty
The Triumph of Cleopatra
1821

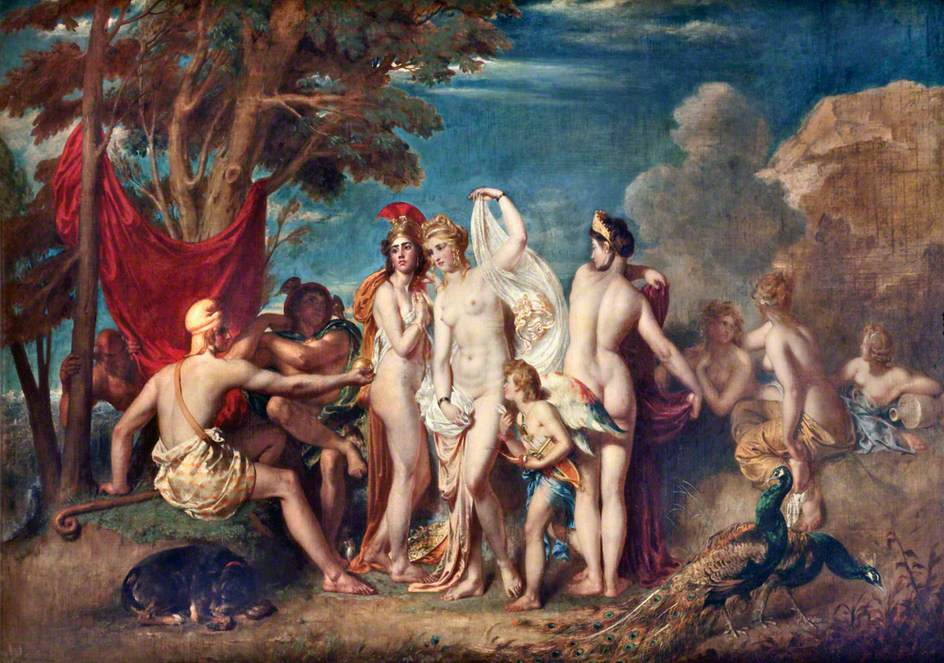
William Etty
The Judgement of Paris
1826

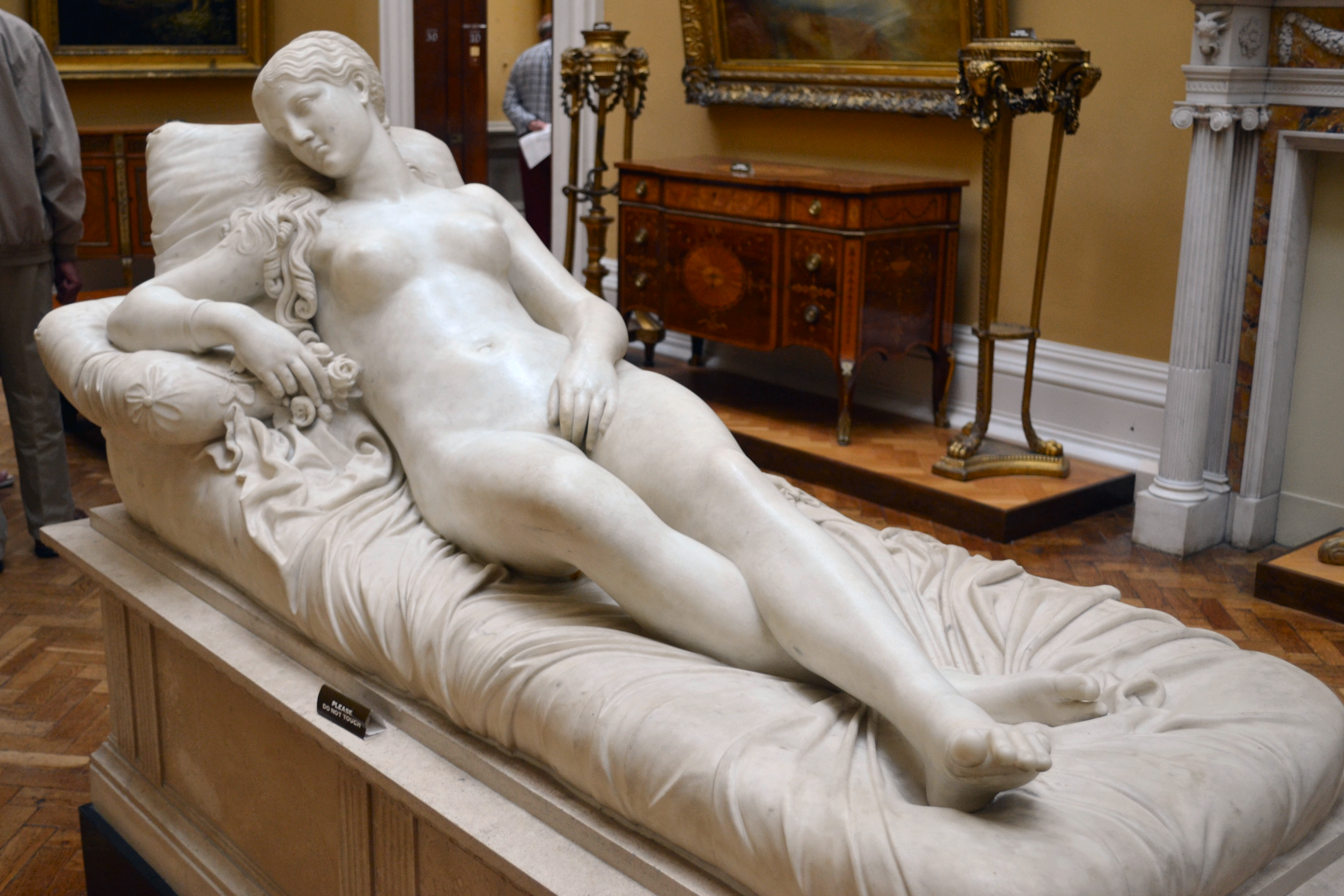
after Lorenzo Bartolini
Venus
1830

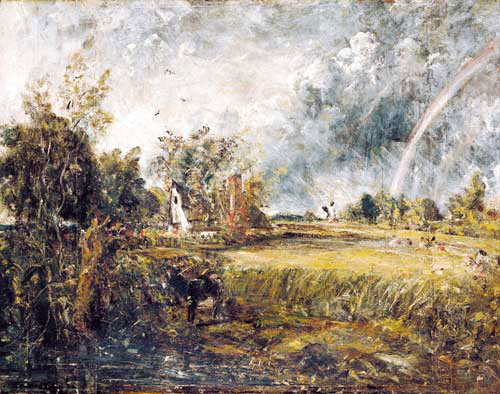
John Constable
Cottage at East Bergholt
1833

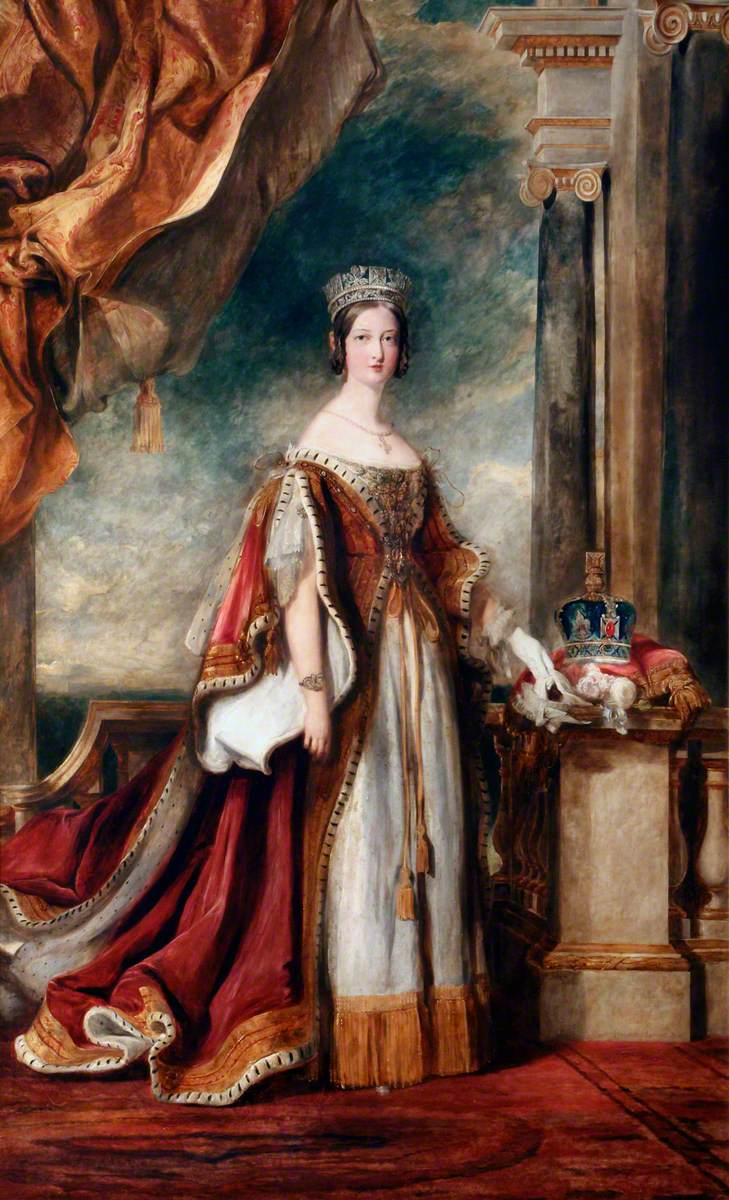
David Wilkie
Portrait of Queen Victoria
1840

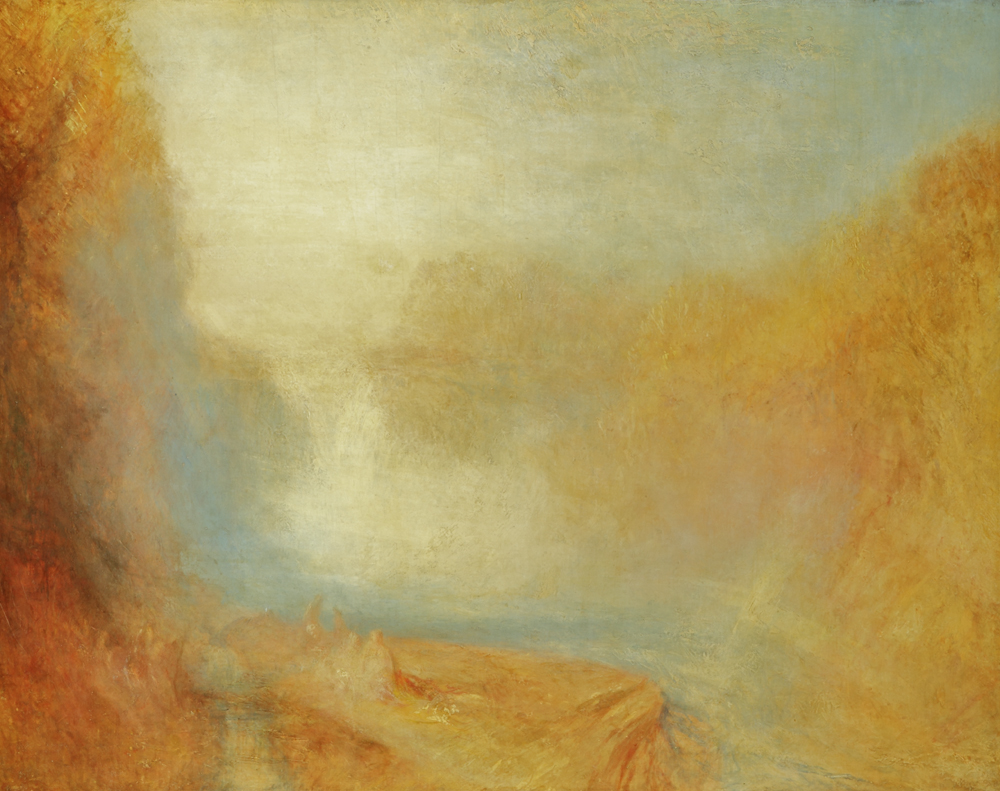
J. M. W. Turner
The Falls of the Clyde
circa 1845

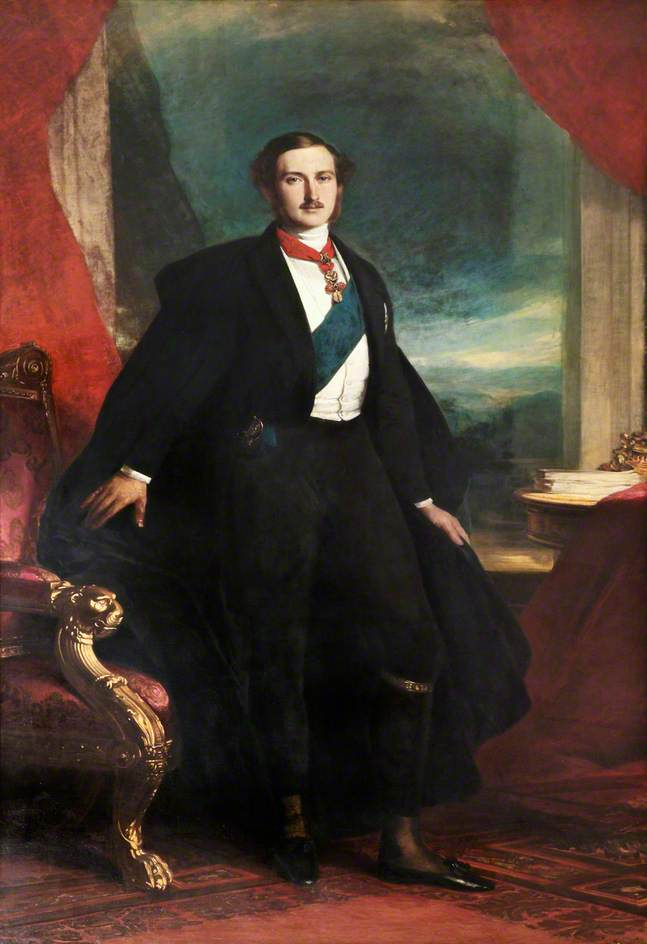
Franz Xaver Winterhalter
Prince Albert
1846

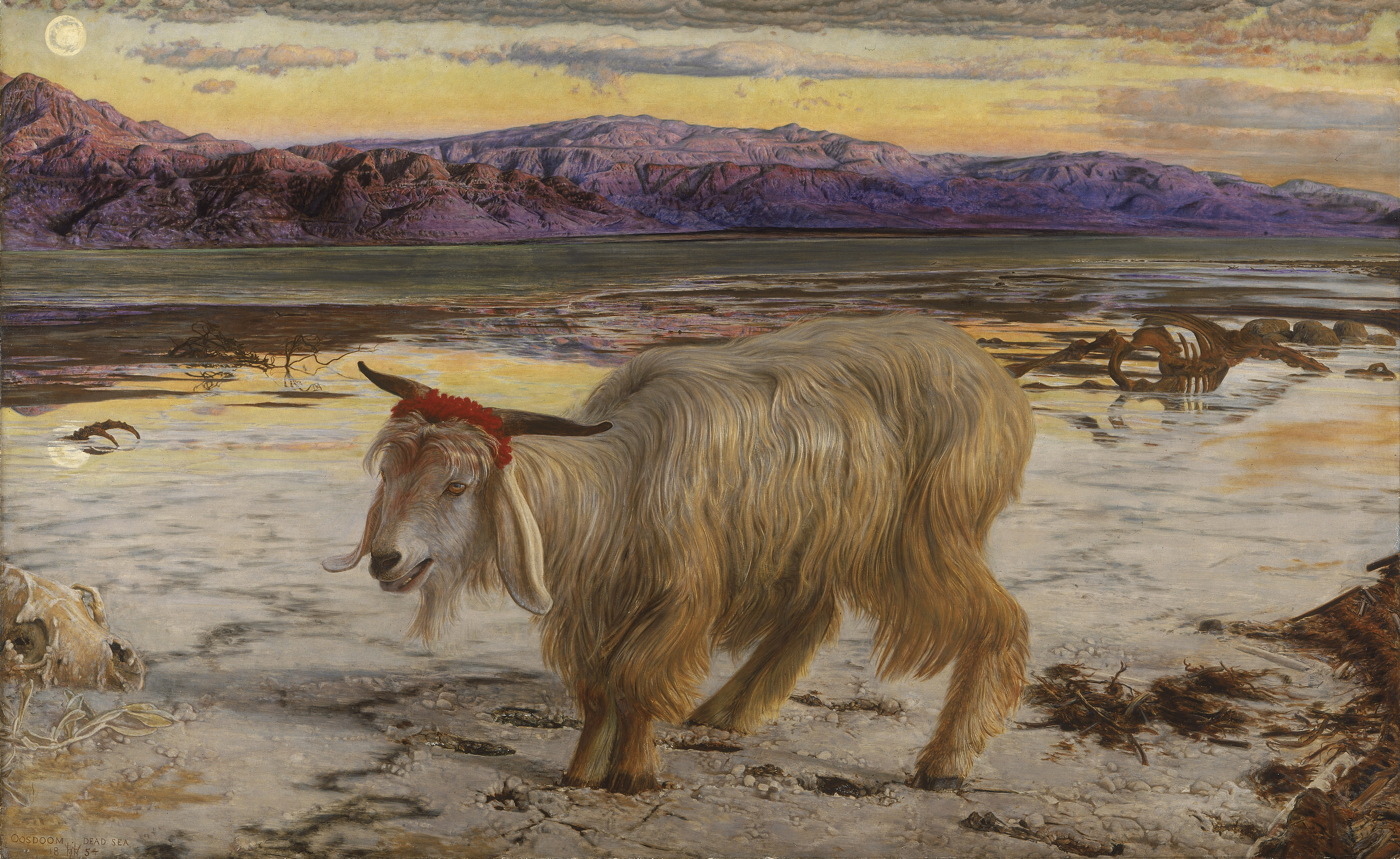
William Holman Hunt
The Scapegoat
1854

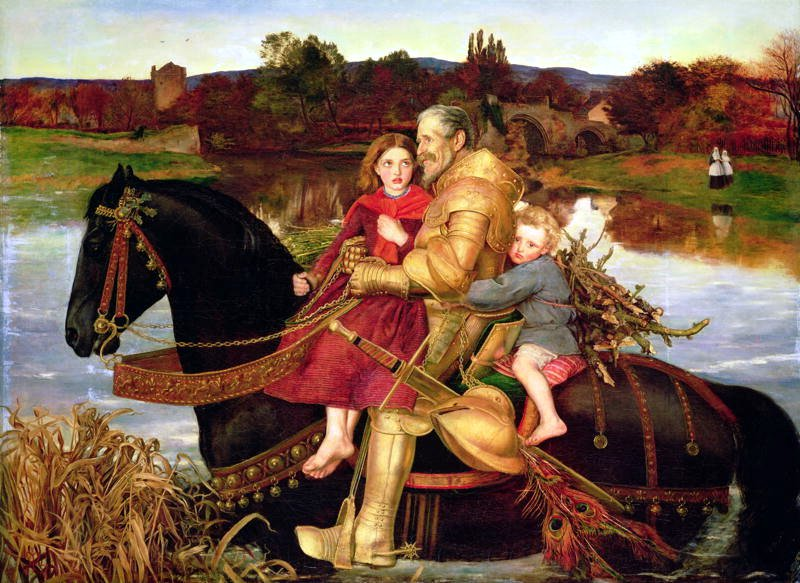
John Everett Millais
A Dream of the Past: Sir Isumbras at the Ford
1857

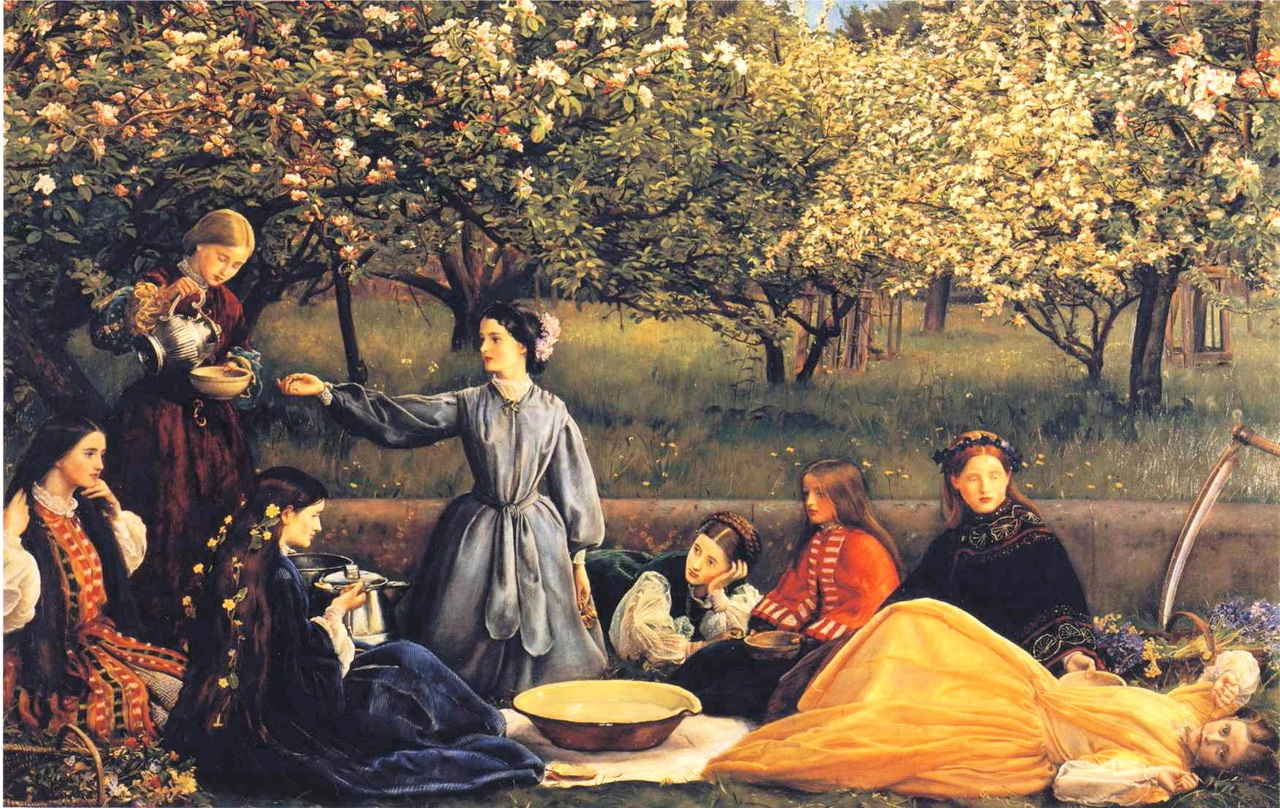
John Everett Millais
Spring (Apple Blossoms)
1858 – 1859

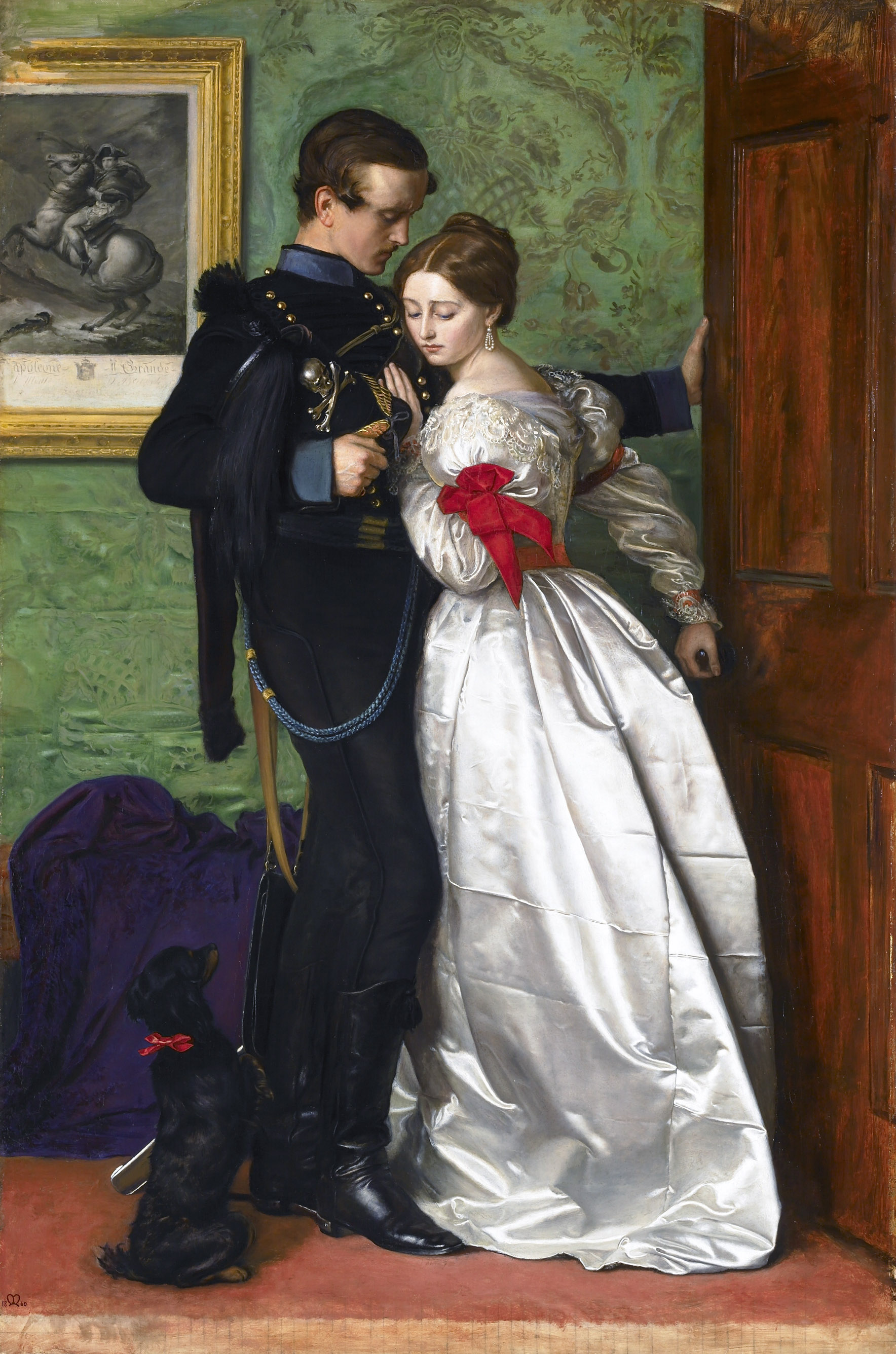
John Everett Millais
The Black Brunswicker
1860

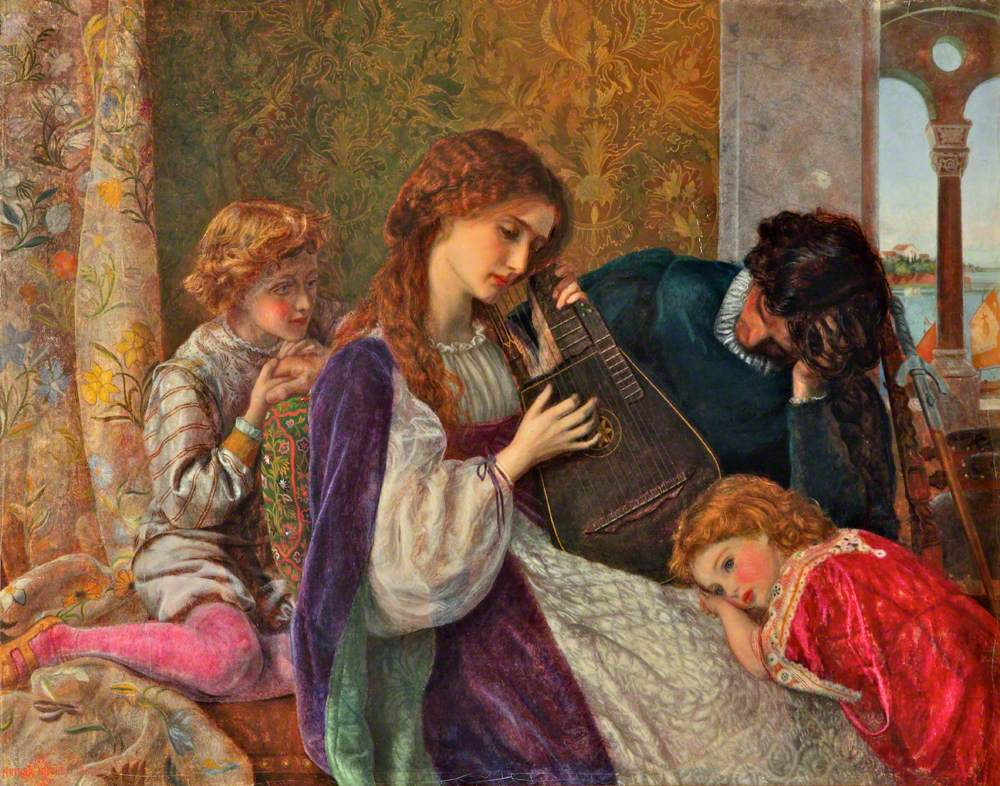
Arthur Hughes
A Music Party
1864

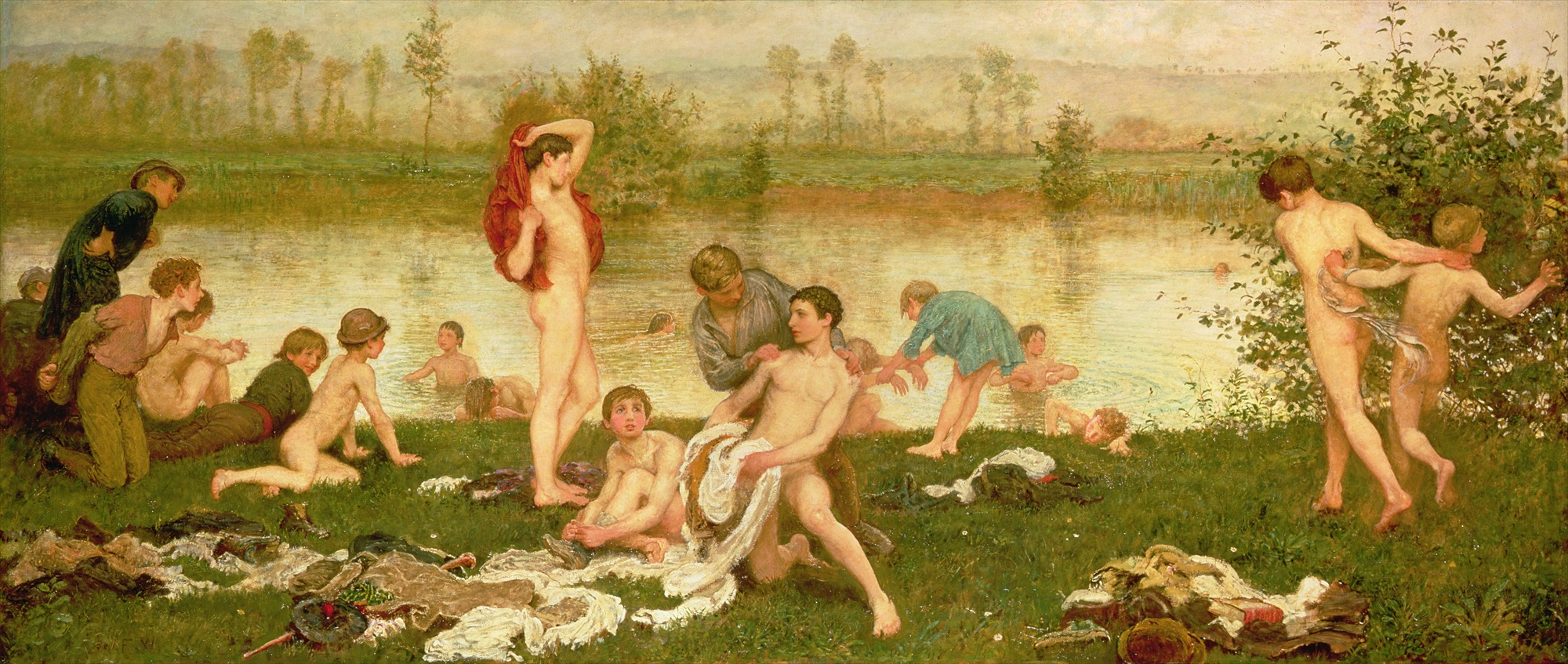
Frederick Walker
The Bathers
1866 – 1867

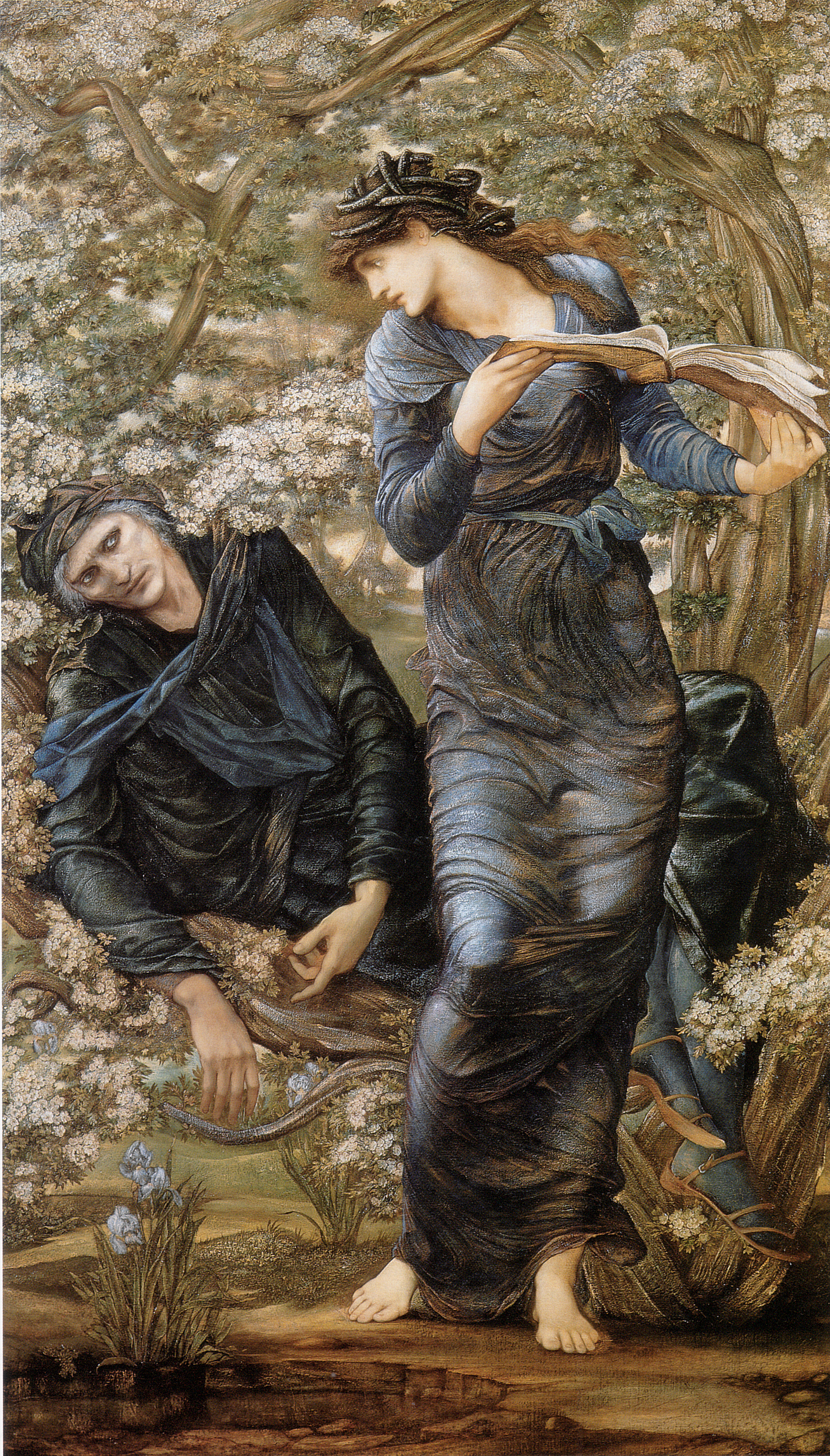
Edward Burne-Jones
The Beguiling of Merlin
1874

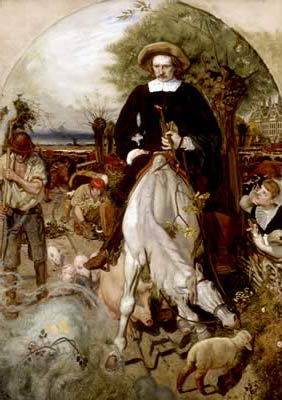
Ford Madox Brown
Cromwell on his Farm
1874

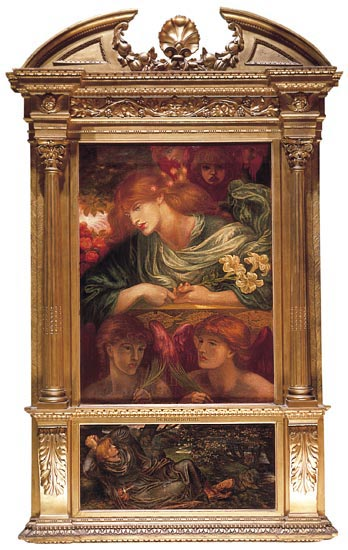
Dante Gabriel Rossetti
The Blessed Damozel
1875

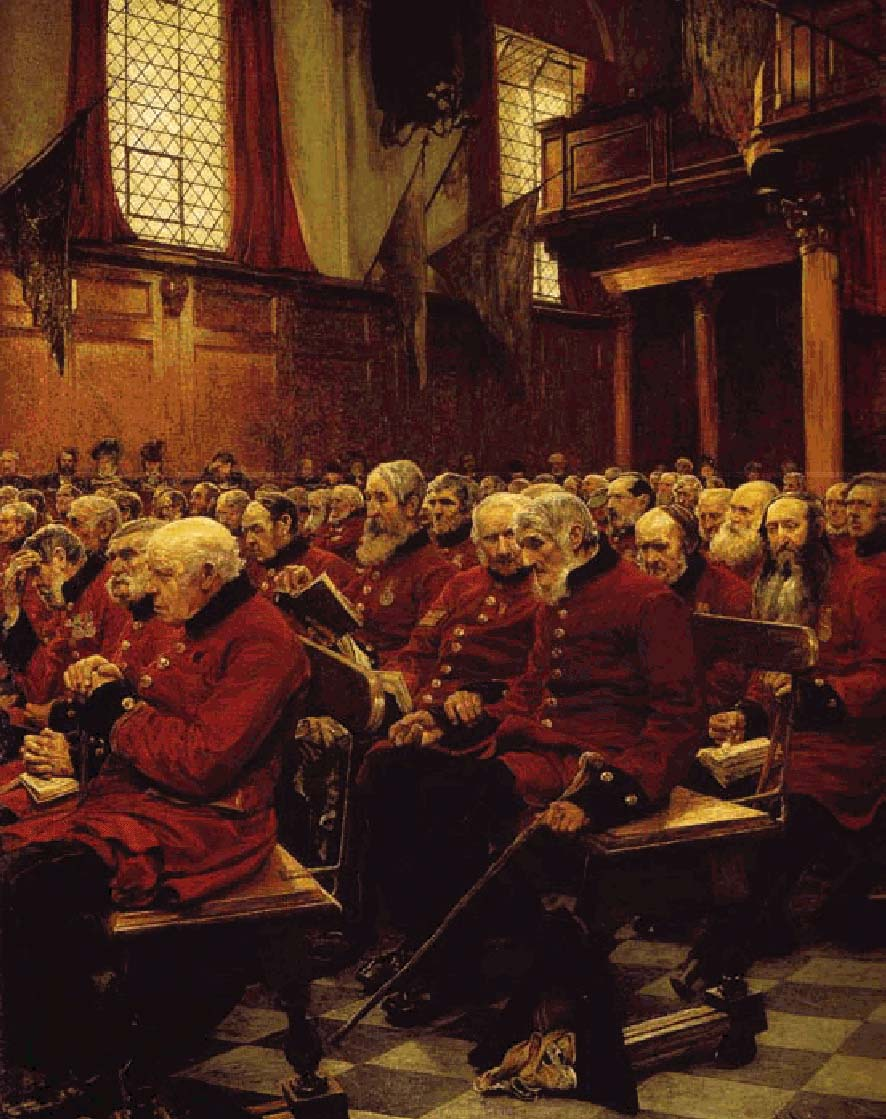
Hubert von Herkomer
The Last Muster
1875

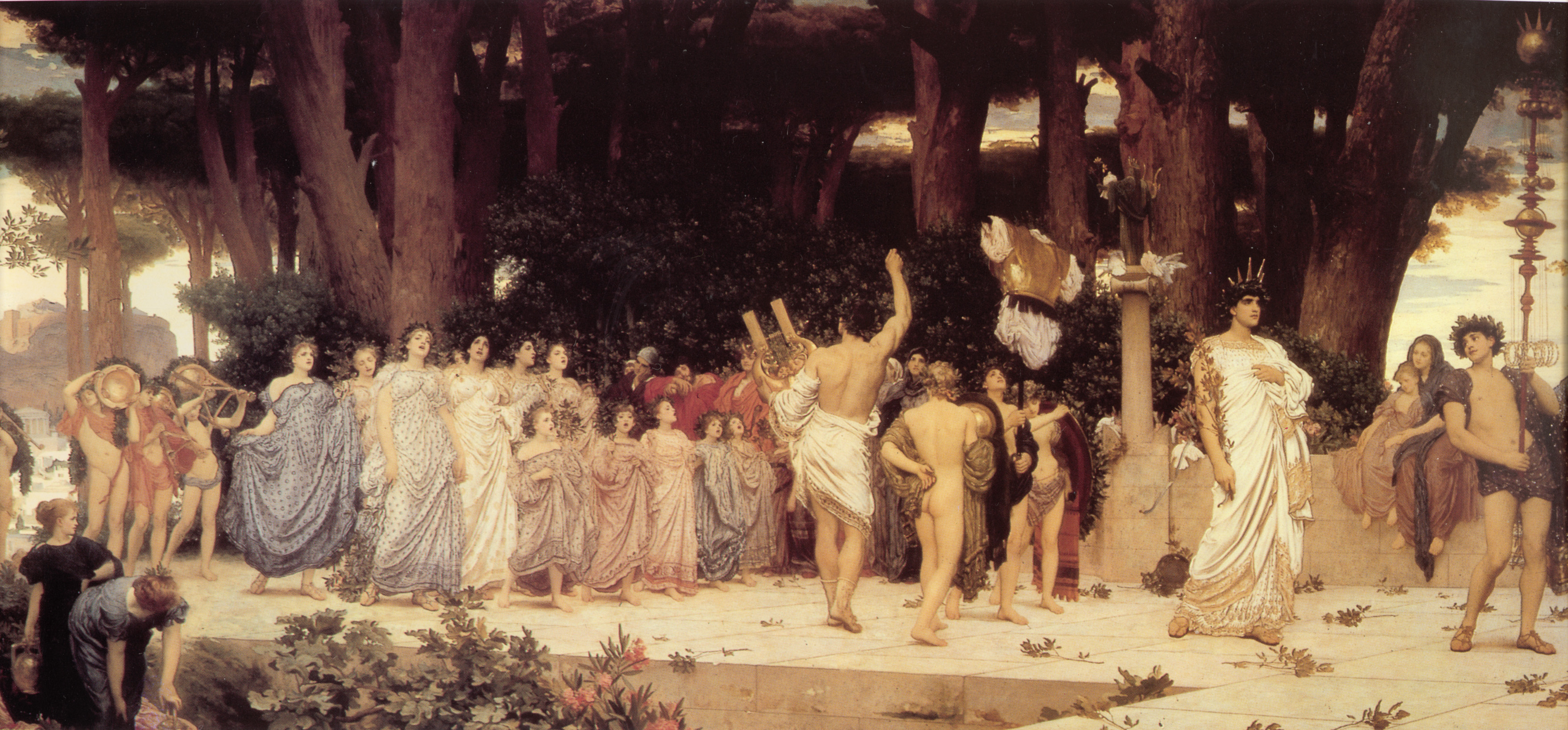
Frederic Leighton
Daphnephoria
1876

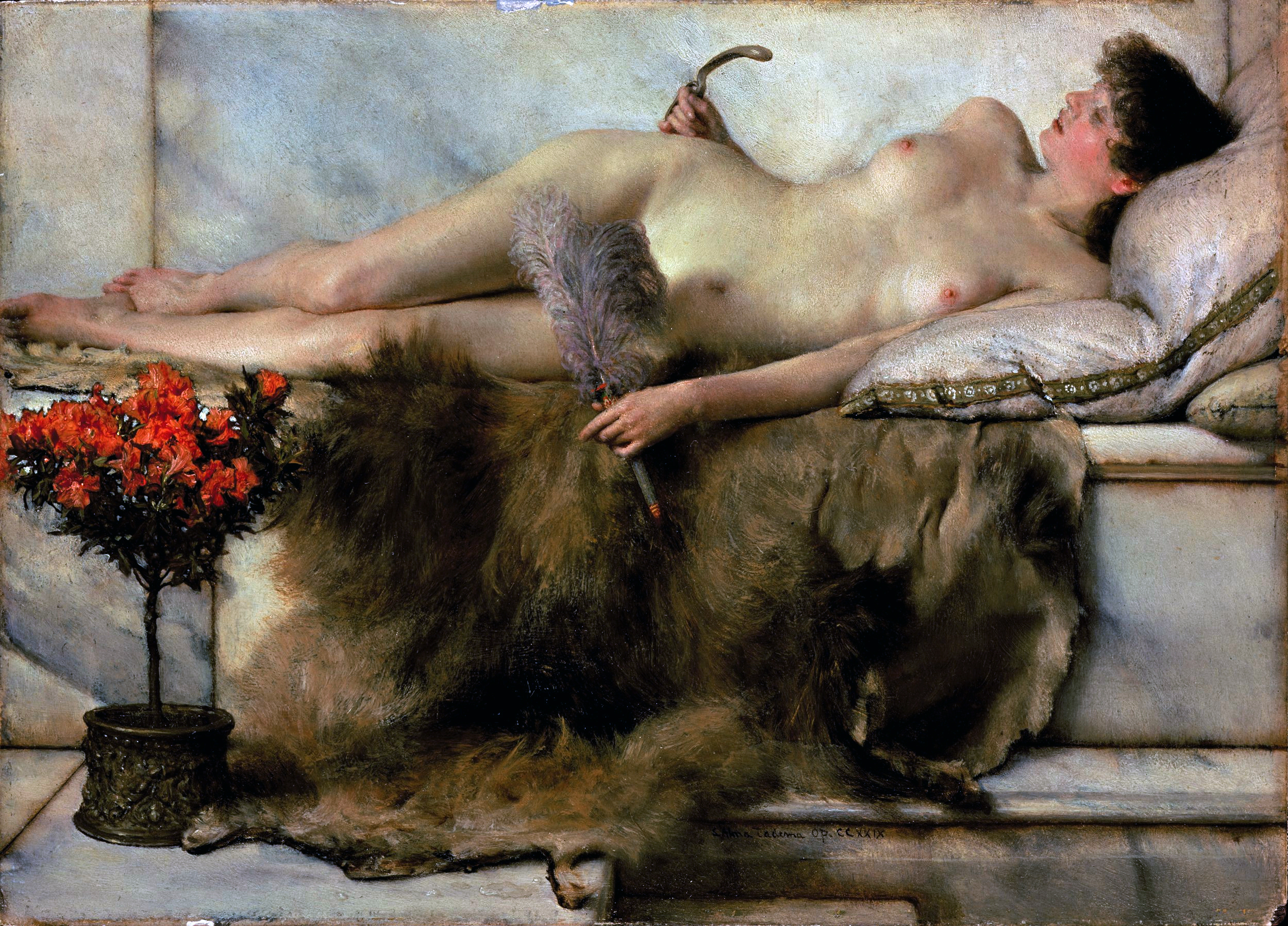
Lawrence Alma-Tadema
The Tepidarium
1881

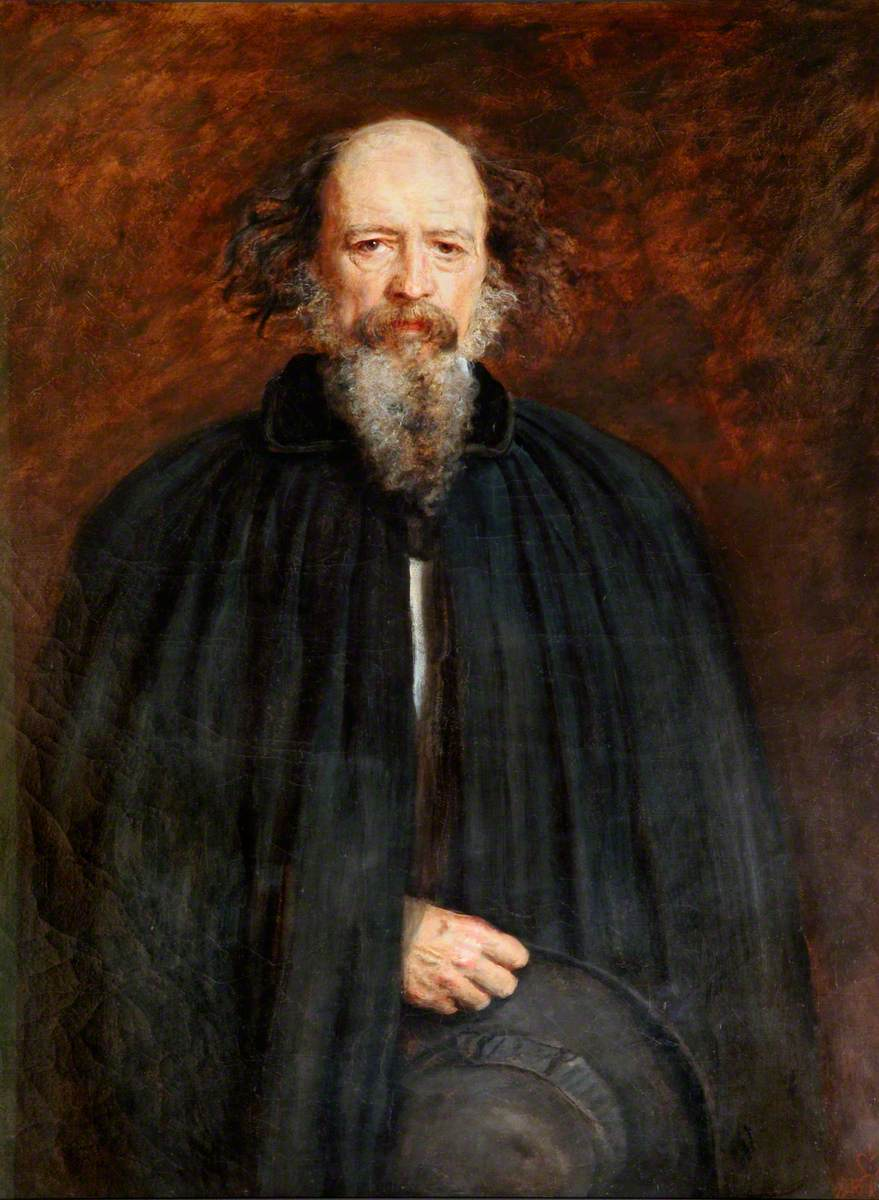
John Everett Millais
Portrait of Alfred Tennyson
1881

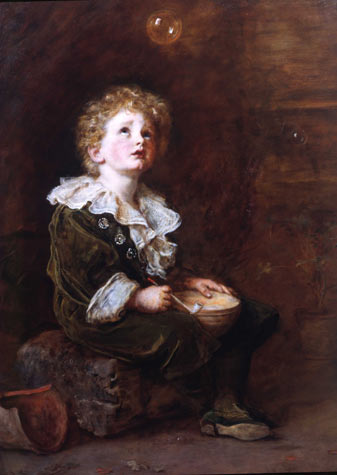
John Everett Millais
Bubbles
1886

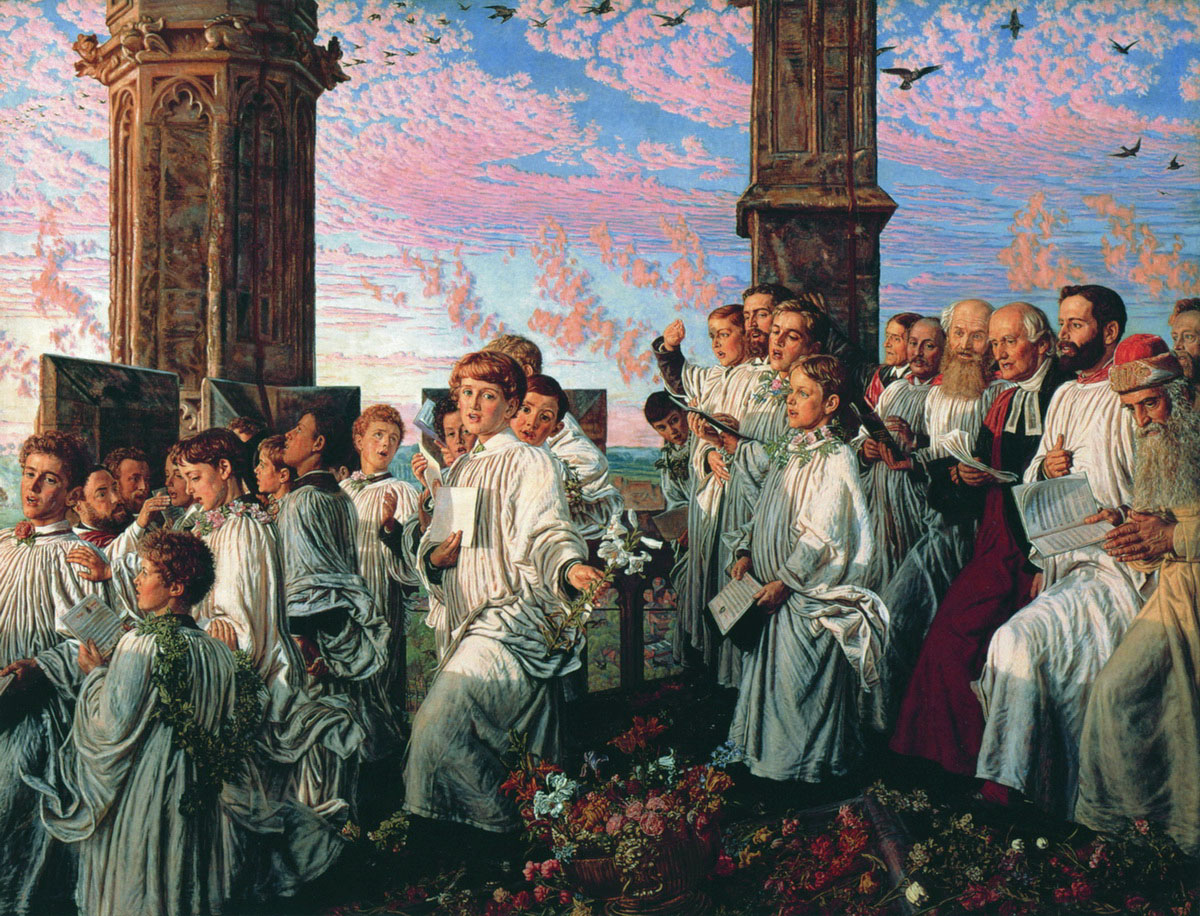
William Holman Hunt
May Morning on Magdalen Tower
1890

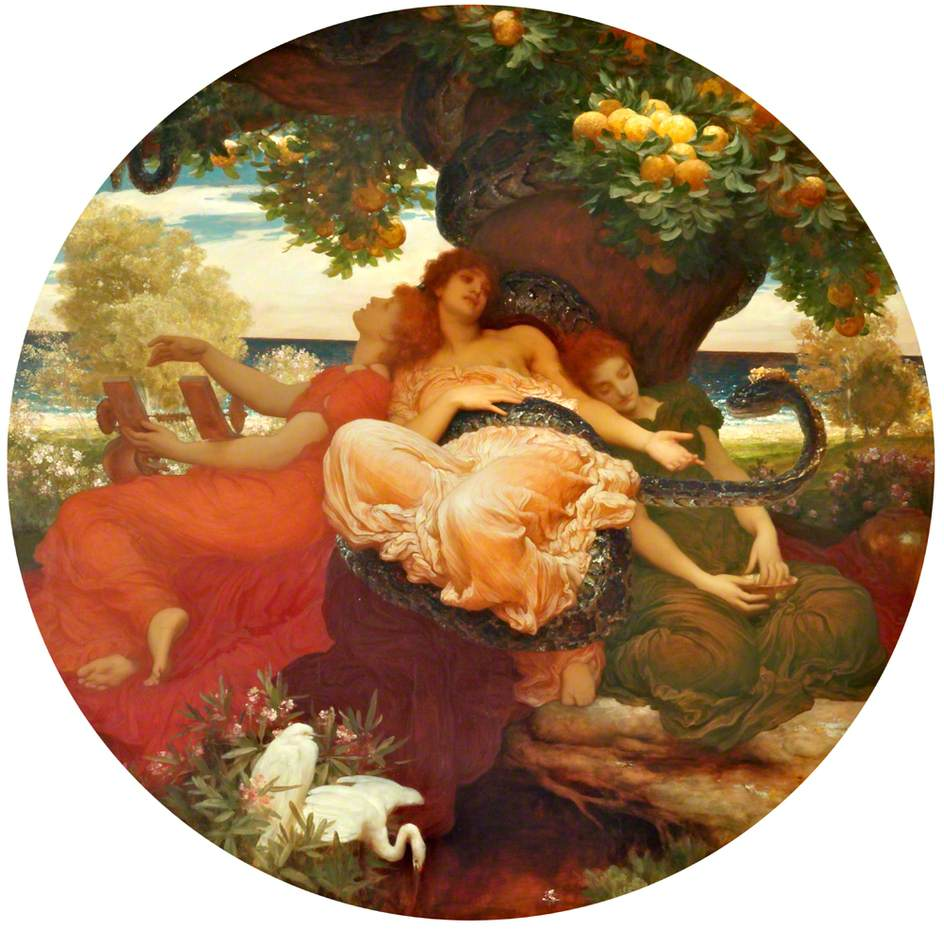
Frederic Leighton
The Garden of Hesperides
circa 1891

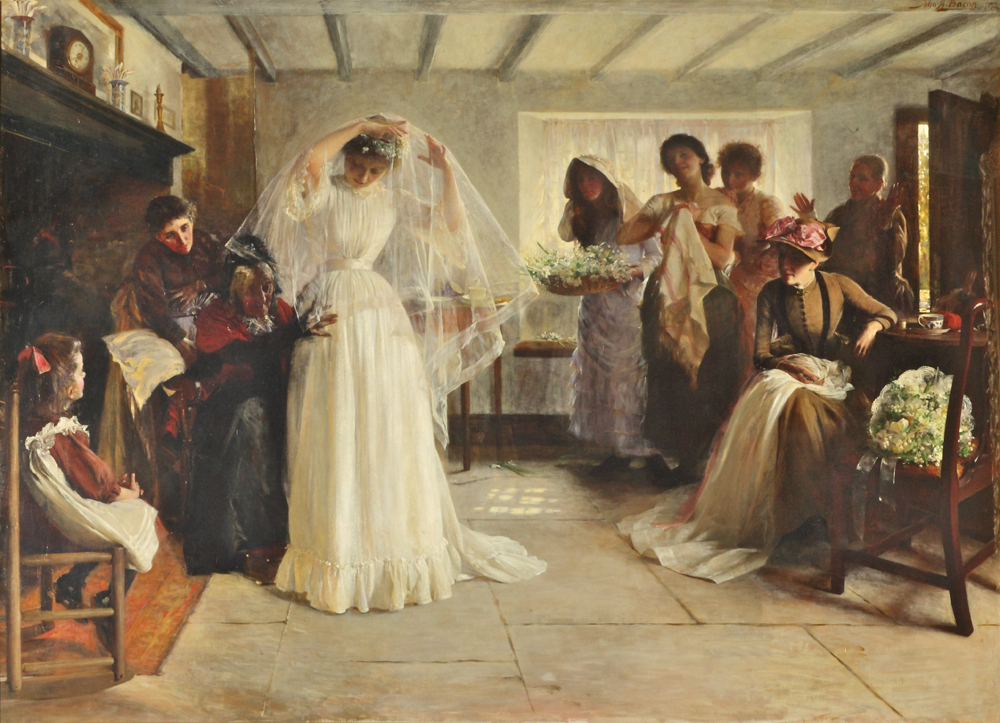
John Henry Frederick Bacon
The Wedding Morning
1892

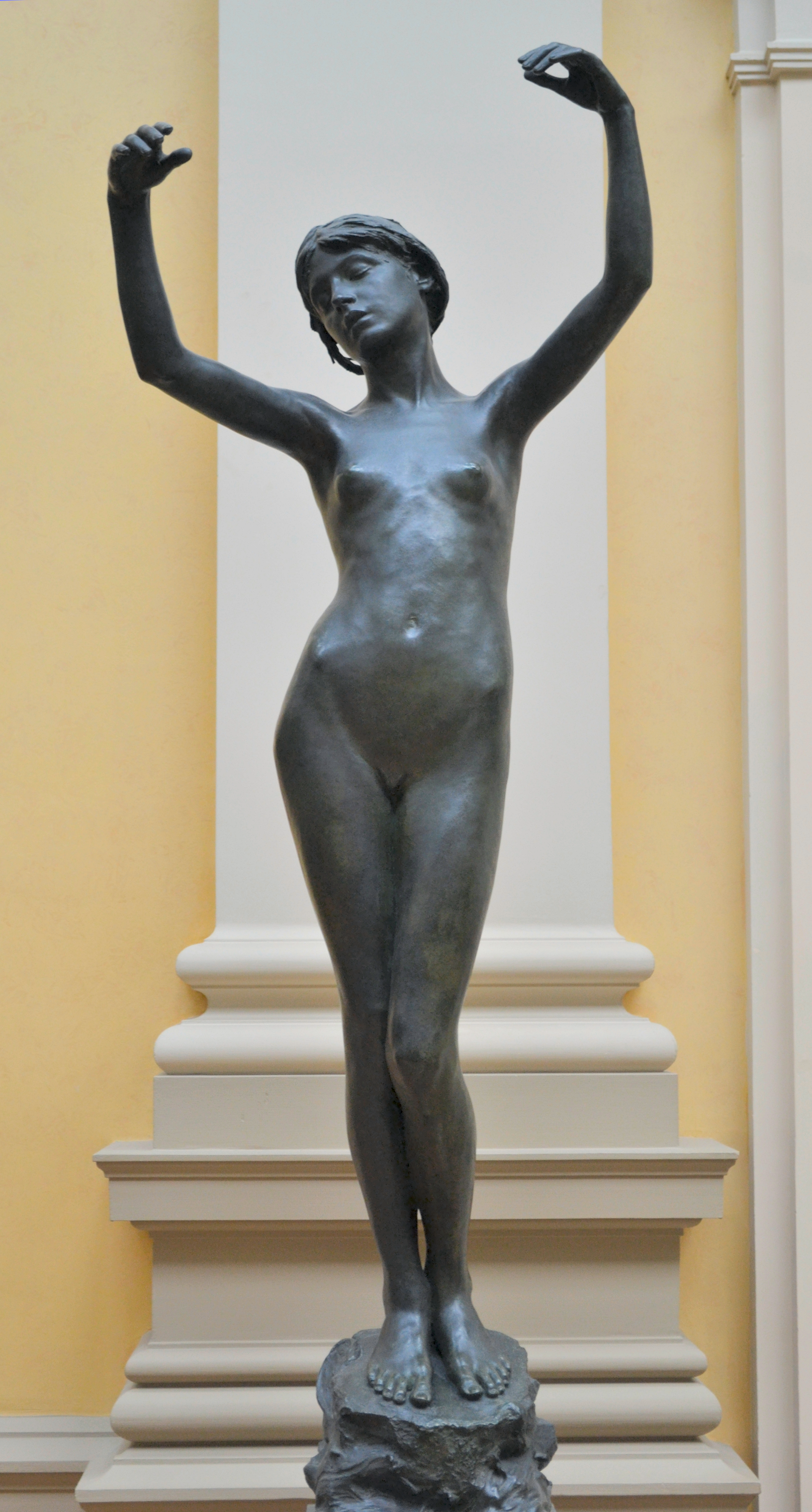
Edward Onslow Ford
Echo
1895

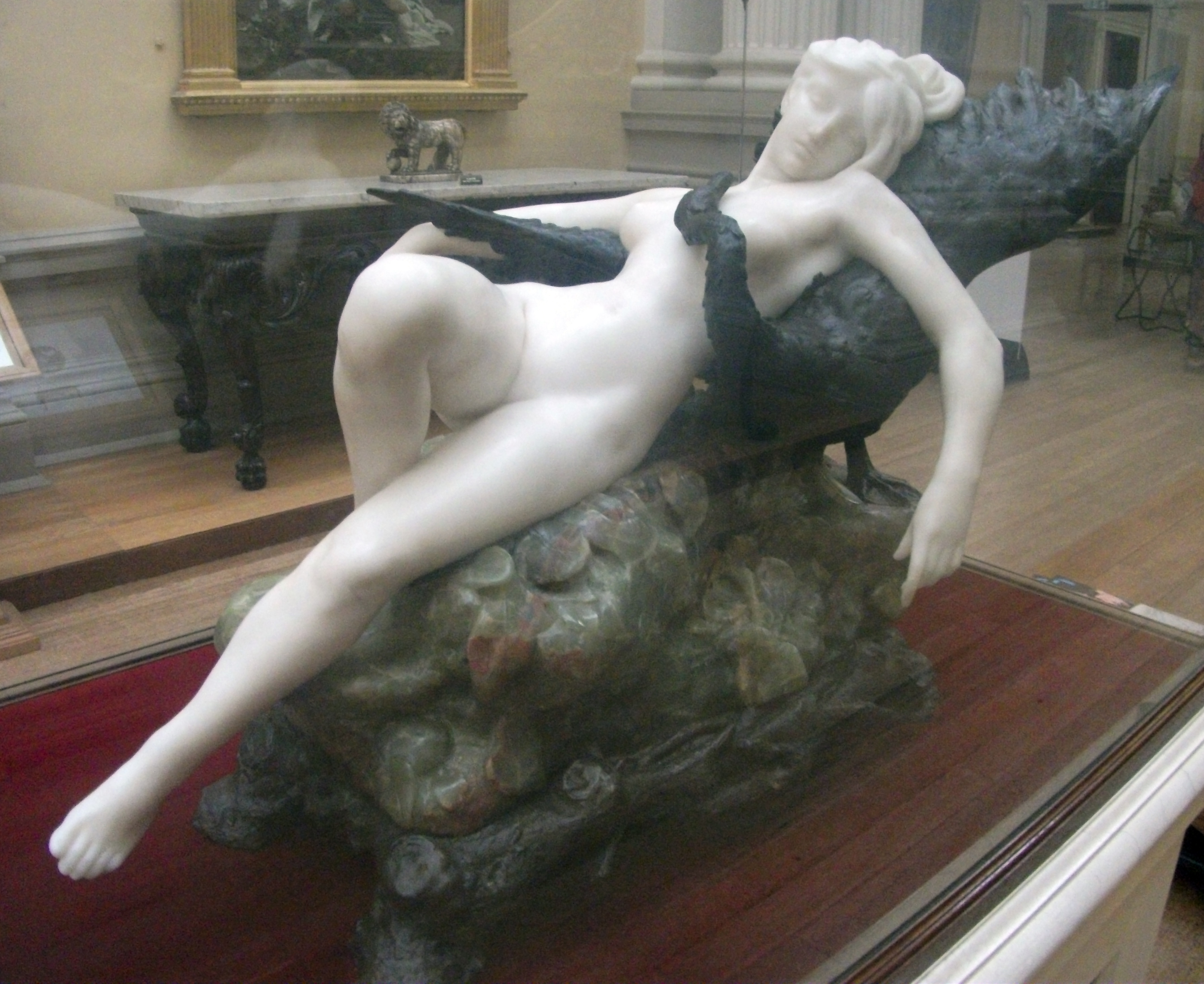
Desiré Maurice Ferrary (fr)
Leda and the Swan
1898

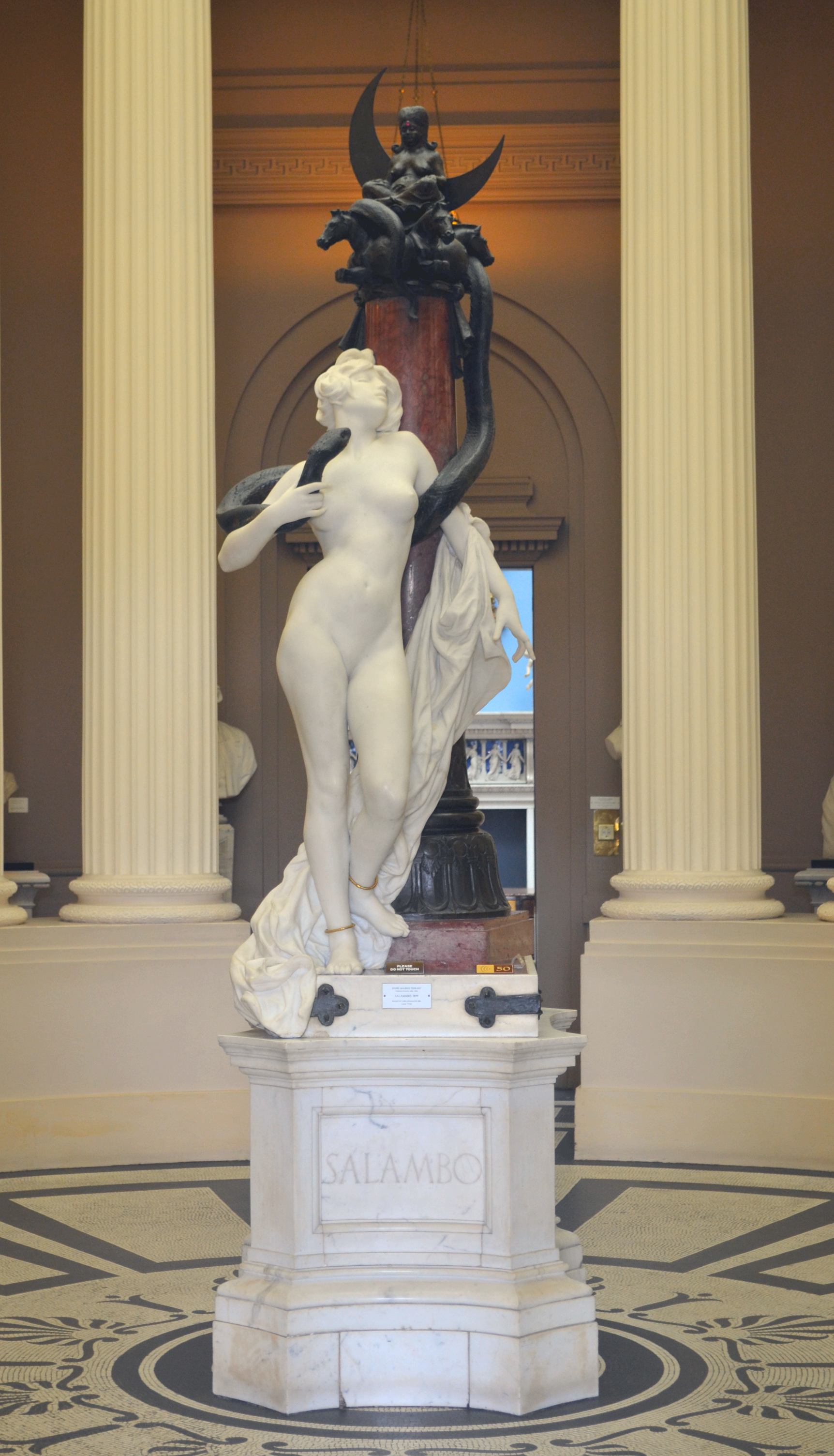
Desiré Maurice Ferrary
Salambo
1899

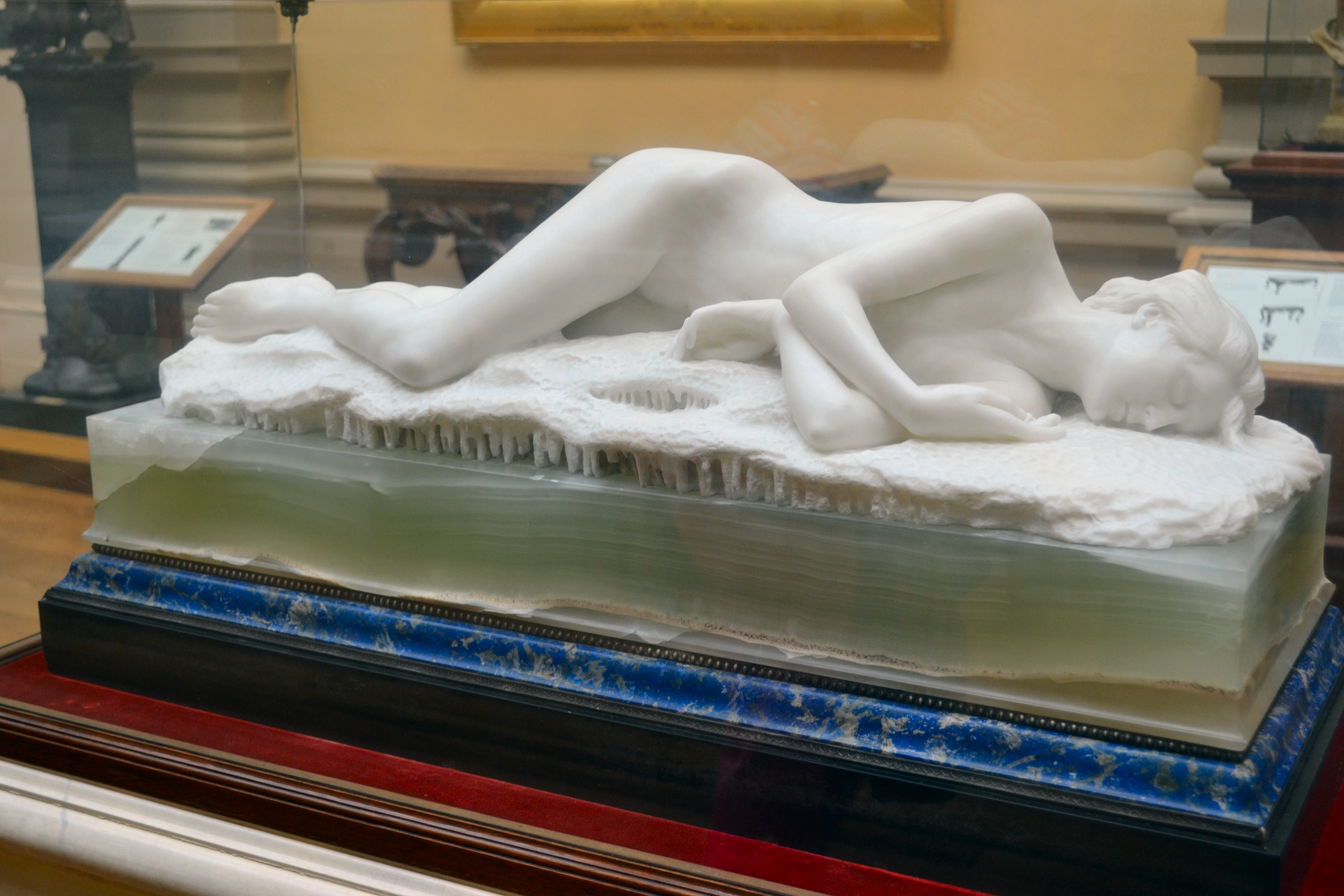
Edward Onslow Ford
The Snowdrift
1901

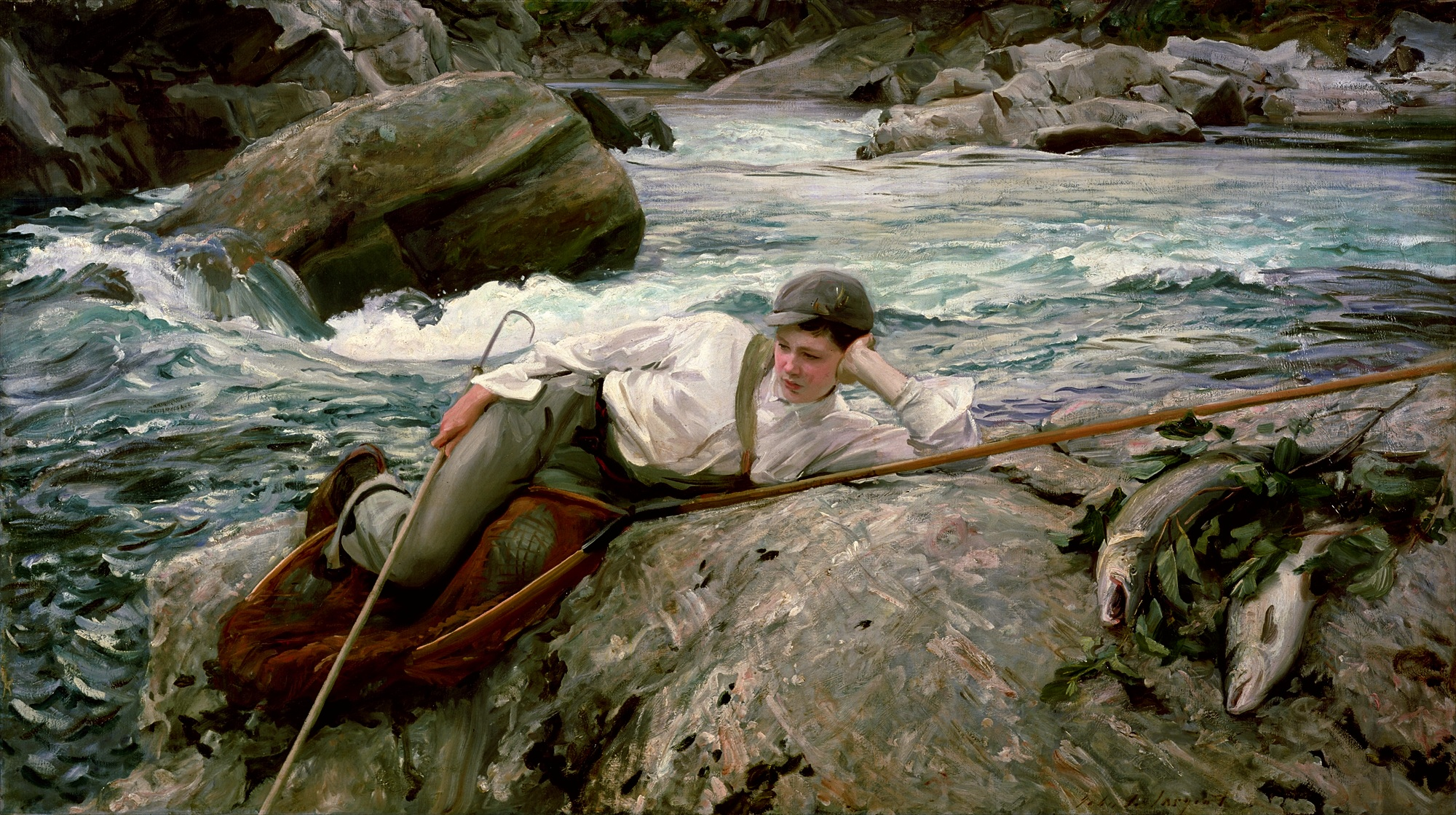
John Singer Sargent
On his Holidays, Norway
1901

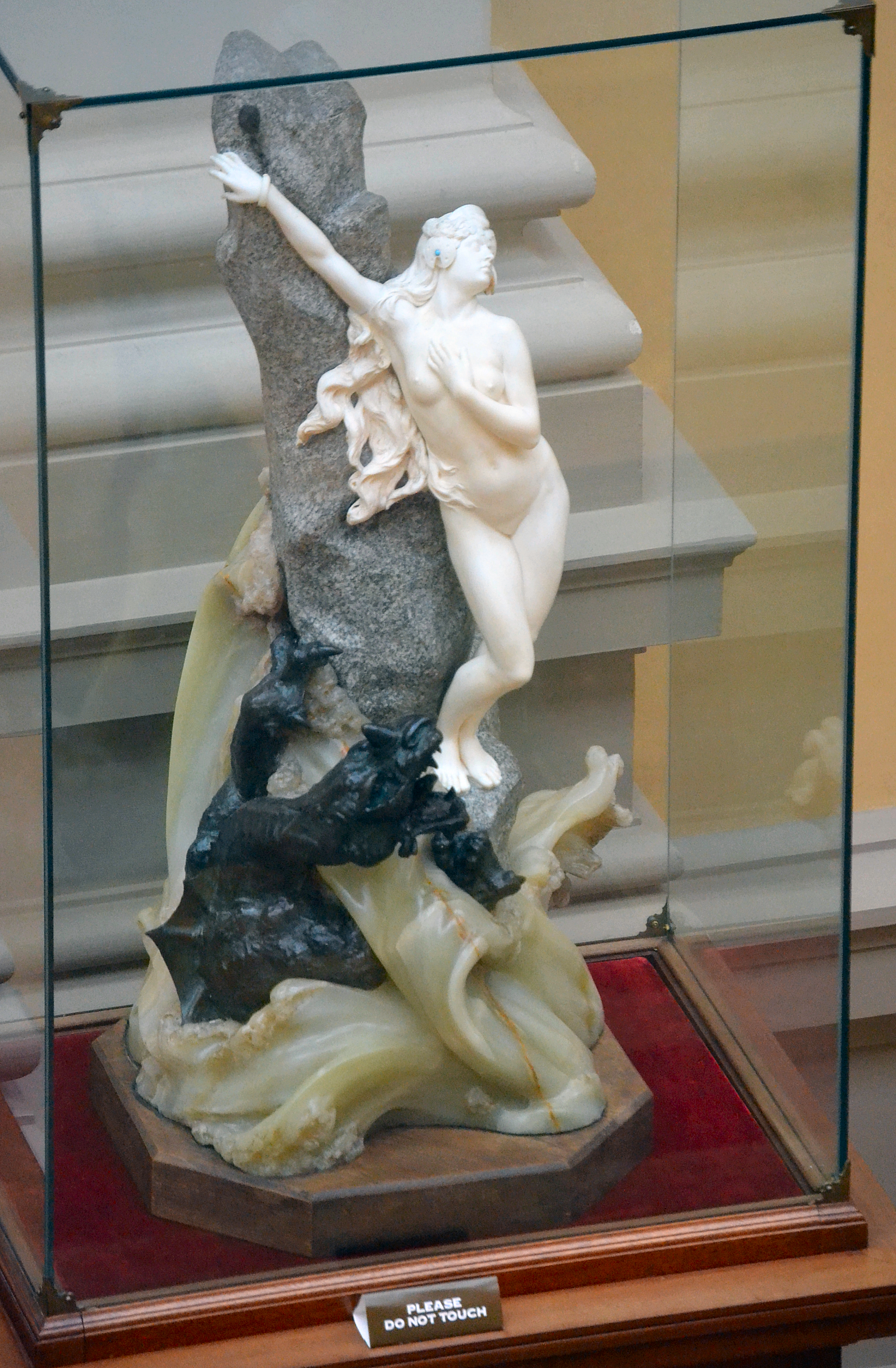
Clovis Delacour (fr)
Andromeda
circa 1901

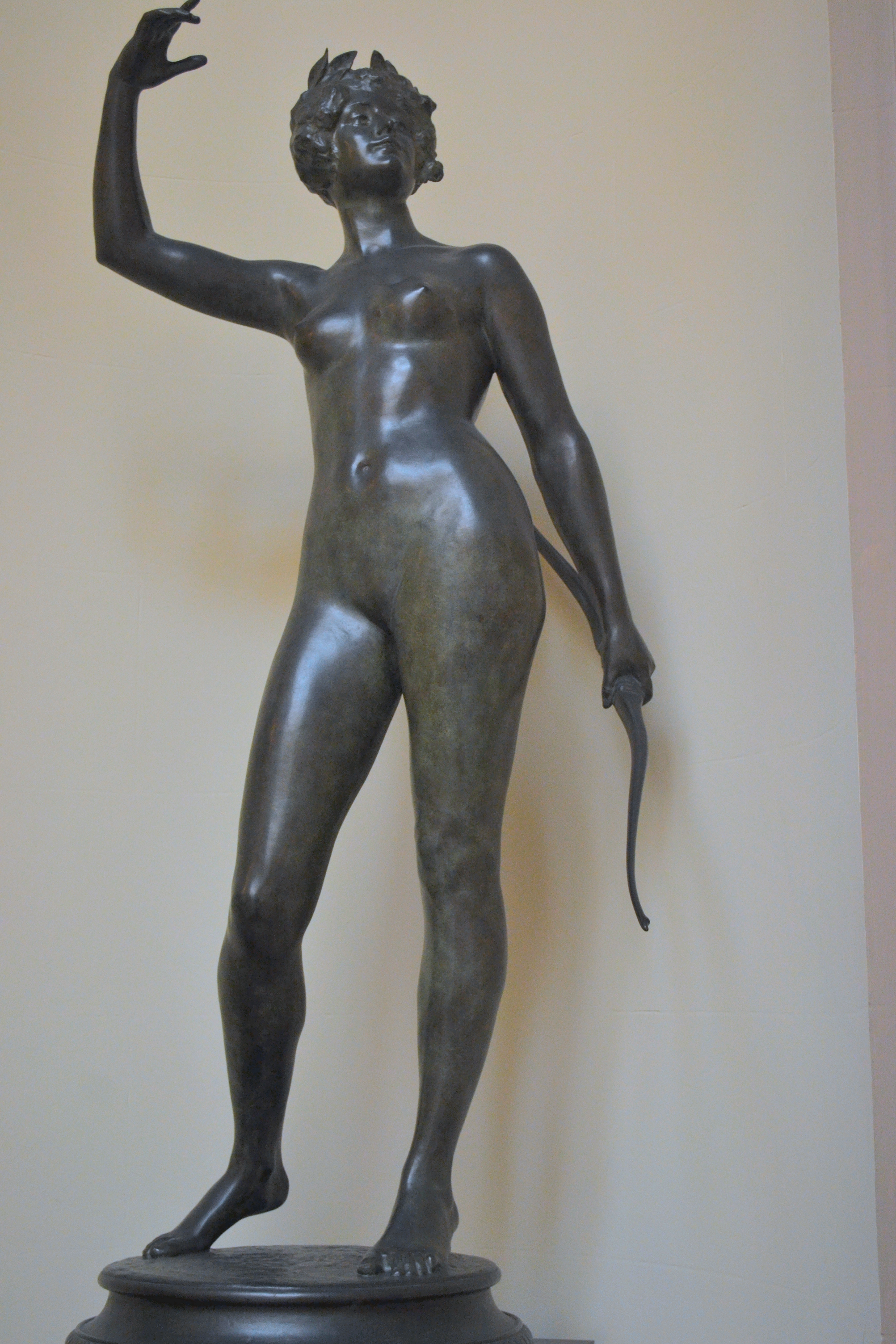
F. W. Pomeroy
The Wood Nymph
1908

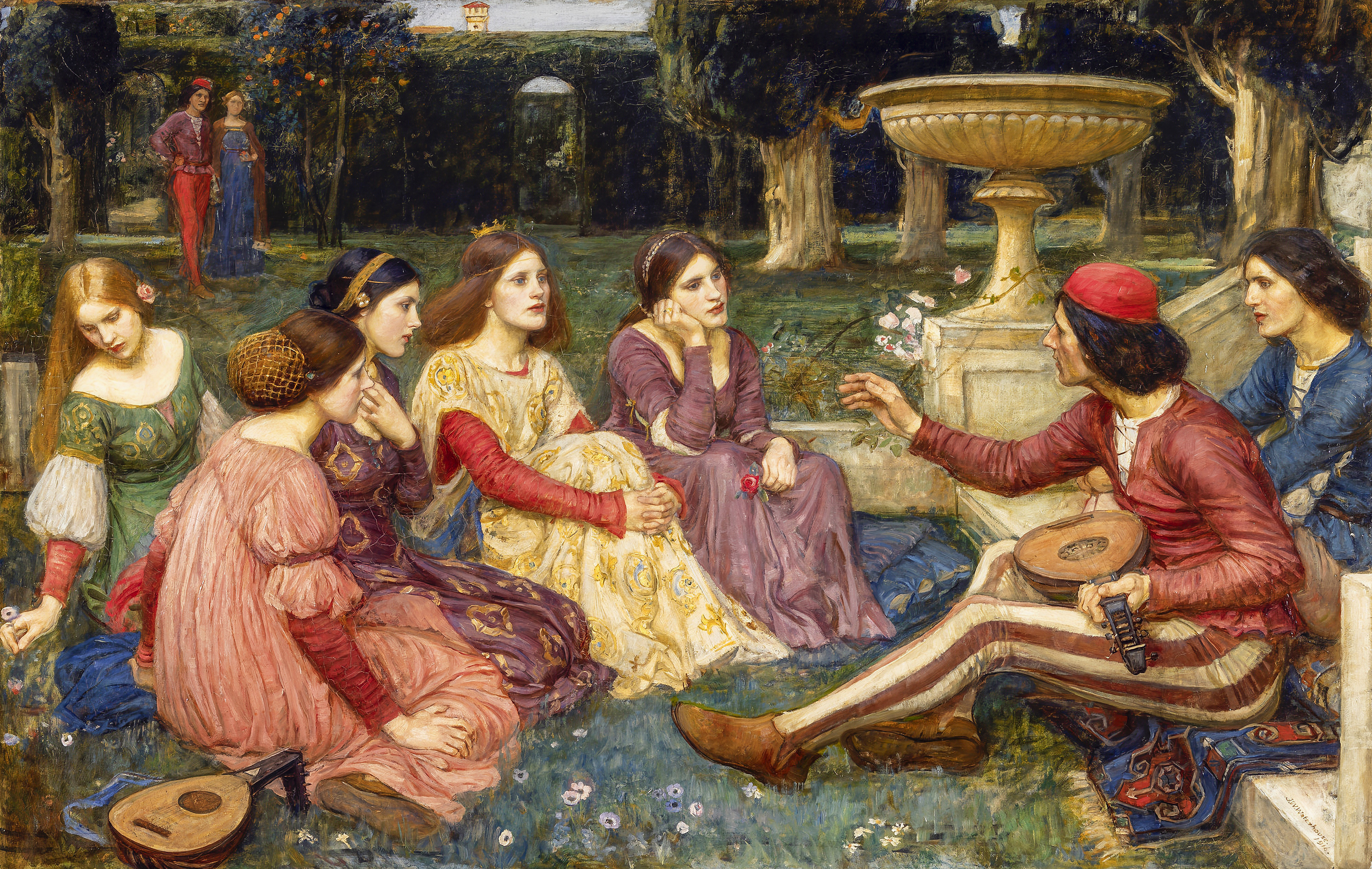
John William Waterhouse
The Decameron
1916

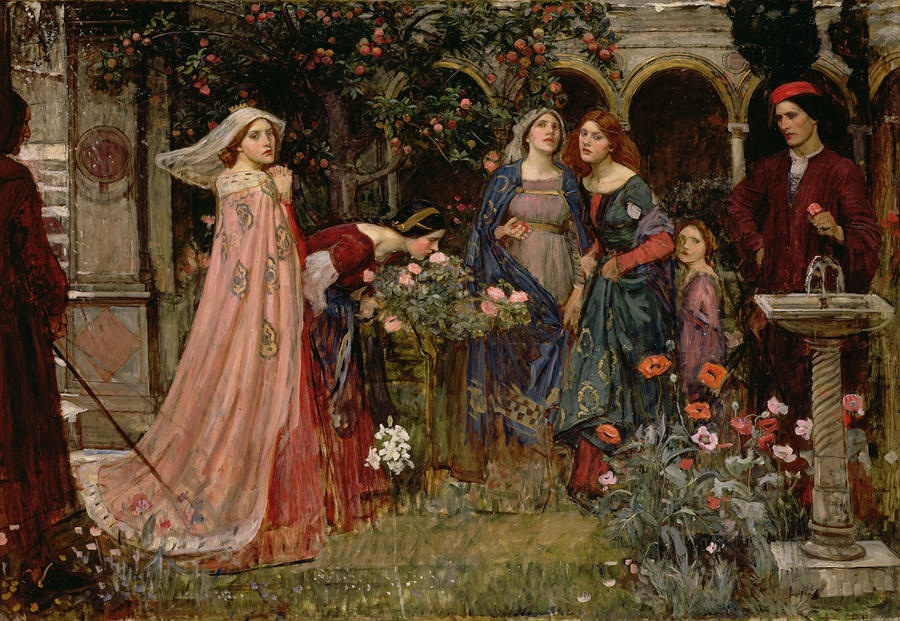
John William Waterhouse
The Enchanted Garden
1916 – 1917

== See also ==
- Listed buildings in Port Sunlight
- The Stuckists Punk Victorian
- Walker Art Gallery
