= Portrait of Alfred Tennyson =

Painting by John Everett Millais

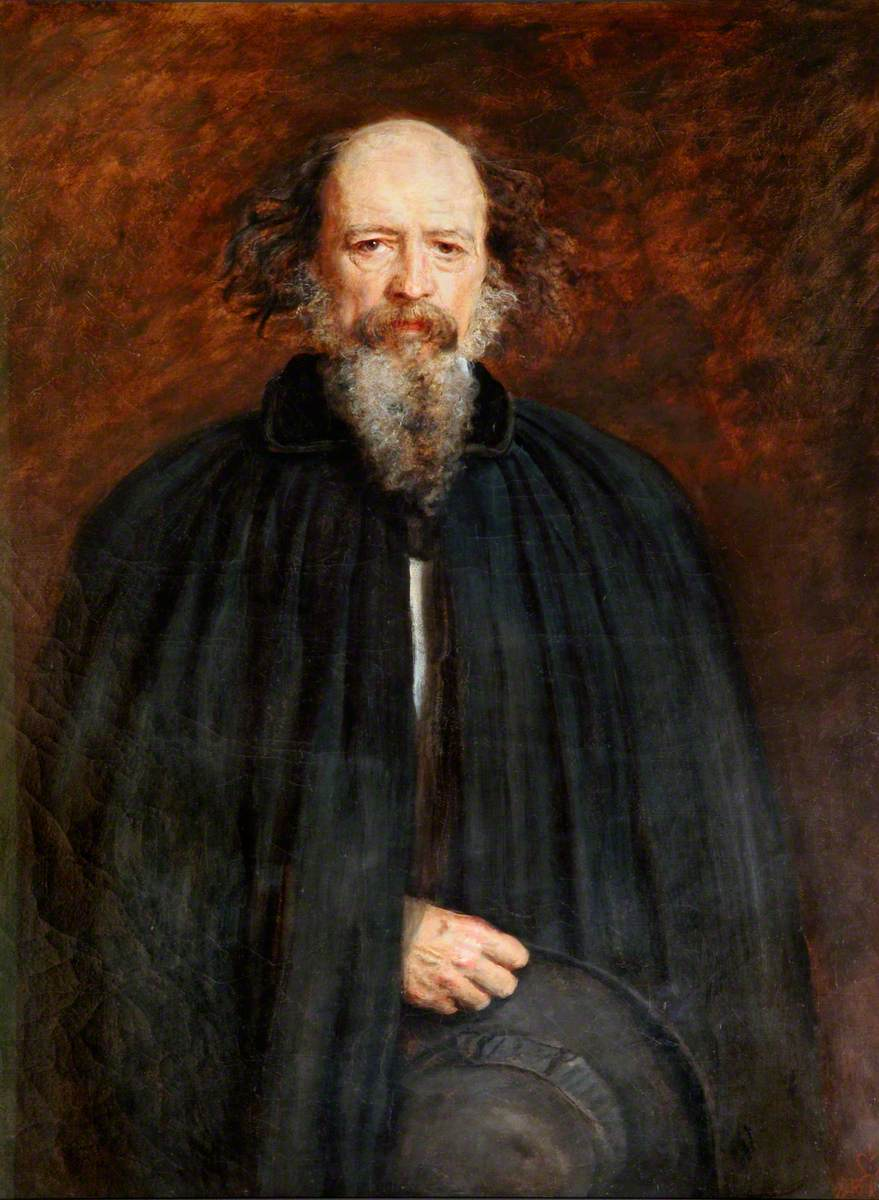
- Artist: John Everett Millais
- Year: 1881
- Type: Oil on canvas, portrait painting
- Dimensions: 127 cm × 93 cm (50 in × 37 in)
- Location: Lady Lever Art Gallery; Merseyside

Portrait of Alfred Tennyson is an 1881 portrait painting by the British artist John Everett Millais. It depicts the English writer Alfred Tennyson, who has served as Poet Laureate since 1850. Tennyson is shown with the flowing cloak and broad-brimmed hat he was known for wearing, with the muted colours emphasising his forceful character. Tennyson's early Romantic poetry had provided an inspiration for the Pre-Raphaelite Brotherhood.

It was one of a series of dignified portraits Millais produced of leading public figures of Victorian Britain during the period. Today the painting is in the collection of the Lady Lever Art Gallery, having been gifted by Lord Leverhulme in 1922. Although Millais was pleased with the painting which "without immodesty, I am sure is the best of him", but Tennyson complained it had neither "brain nor a soul". An engraving was produced based on the picture by Thomas Oldham Barlow.

== See also ==
- List of paintings by John Everett Millais

== Bibliography ==
- ALlexander, Michael. Medievalism; The Middle Ages in Modern England. Yale University Press, 2017.
- Barlow, Paul. Time Present and Time Past: The Art of John Everett Millais. Routledge, 2017.
- Mancoff, Debra N. (ed.) John Everett Millais: Beyond the Pre-Raphaelite Brotherhood. Yale University Press, 2021.
- Riding, Christine. Tate British Artists: John Everett Millais. Harry N. Abrams, 2006.
- Tate, Gregory. The Poet's Mind: The Psychology of Victorian Poetry 1830–1870. Oxford University Press, 2012
