= Lady Hamilton as a Bacchante =

Painting by Élisabeth Vigée Le Brun

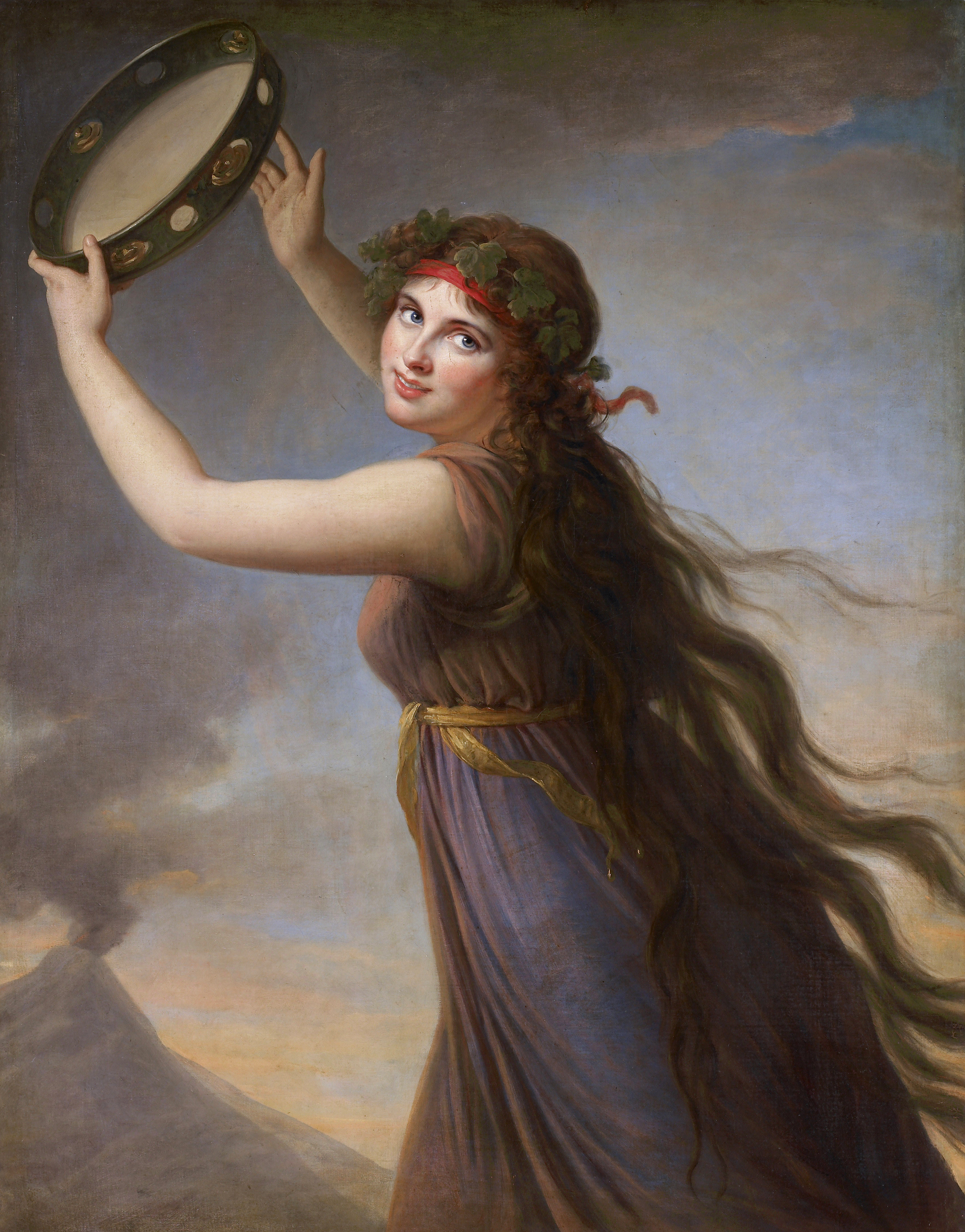
- Artist: Élisabeth Vigée Le Brun
- Year: c.1792
- Type: Oil on canvas, portrait painting
- Dimensions: 132.5 cm × 105.5 cm (52.2 in × 41.5 in)
- Location: Lady Lever Art Gallery; Merseyside

Lady Hamilton as a Bacchante is a c. 1792 portrait painting by the French artist Élisabeth Louise Vigée Le Brun. It depicts the English dancer and actress Emma, Lady Hamilton. She is depicted as a Bacchante from Greek Mythology.

She married Sir William Hamilton, the British ambassador in Naples, in 1791. It was one of four paintings of Hamilton that Le Brun painted during her own time in Italy, where she had moved following the French Revolution. Lady Hamilton later became known for her love affair with the British admiral Horatio Nelson, 1st Viscount Nelson. Today the painting is in the collection of the Lady Lever Art Gallery, having been acquired in 1925.

== Bibliography ==
- Baillio, Joseph & Baetjer, Katharine & Lang, Paul. Vigée Le Brun. Metropolitan Museum of Art, 2016.
- Contogouris, Ersy Emma Hamilton and Late Eighteenth-Century European Art: Agency, Performance, and Representation. Routledge, 2018
- Gardner Coates, Victoria C., Lapatin, Kenneth D. S.& Seydl, Jon L. The Last Days of Pompeii: Decadence, Apocalypse, Resurrection. Getty Publications, 2012.
- May, Gita. Elisabeth Vigée Le Brun: The Odyssey of an Artist in an Age of Revolution. Yale University Press, 2008.
- Rauser, Amelia. The Age of Undress: Art, Fashion, and the Classical Ideal in the 1790s. Yale University Press, 2020.
