= Thomas O'Brien =

Thomas O'Brien, Tom O'Brien, or Tommy O'Brien may refer to:

== Politicians ==
- Thomas C. O'Brien (1887–1951), American politician and lawyer
- Thomas J. O'Brien (Illinois politician) (1878–1964), Illinois politician
- Thomas J. O'Brien (Massachusetts politician), Massachusetts state representative
- Thomas J. O'Brien (Michigan politician) (1842–1933), Michigan politician and U.S. ambassador
- Thomas P. O'Brien (born 1959), former United States attorney for the Central District of California
- Sir Tom O'Brien (trade unionist) (1900–1970), British trade unionist and member of parliament

== Sportspeople ==
- Thomas O'Brien (footballer) (born 1991), Scottish footballer
- Tom O'Brien (American football) (born 1948), former American college football coach at NC State
- Tom O'Brien (footballer, born 1889) (1889–1963), Australian rules footballer for University
- Tom O'Brien (footballer, born 1904) (1904–1983), Australian rules footballer for Melbourne
- Tom O'Brien (jockey) (1986–2026), Irish jockey
- Tom O'Brien (outfielder) (1873–1901), Major League Baseball outfielder/infielder
- Tom O'Brien (second baseman) (1860–1921), baseball player
- Tommy O'Brien (baseball) (1918–1978), Major League Baseball outfielder
- Tommy O'Brien (rugby union) (born 1998), Irish rugby union player
- Tommy O'Brien (basketball) (1916–1955), American basketball player

== Others ==
- Thomas O'Brien (bishop) (1792–1874), Church of Ireland bishop of Ossory, Ferns, and Leighlin
- Thomas O'Brien (interior designer) (born 1961), American designer
- Thomas D. O'Brien (1859–1935), co-founder of William Mitchell College of Law
- Thomas J. O'Brien (bishop) (1935–2018), bishop of Phoenix, 1982–2003
- Thomas W. O'Brien (1859–1916), Canadian entrepreneur and pioneer
- Thomas Alexander O'Brien (1888–1948), New Zealand cinema owner and entrepreneur
- Thomas Enraght O'Brien (1827–1896), lord lieutenant of Limerick
- Tom O'Brien (actor, born 1890) (1890–1947), American film actor
- Tom O'Brien (actor) (born 1965), American film actor
- Tom O'Brien (swindler) (1851–1904), American confidence man and swindler
