= Christ Church Cathedral, Dublin =

Diocesan cathedral of Dublin and Glendalough, Church of Ireland

Christ Church Cathedral
- Cathedral of the United Dioceses of Dublin and Glendalough and Metropolitan Cathedral of the United Provinces of Dublin and Cashel
- Cathedral Church of the Holy Trinity
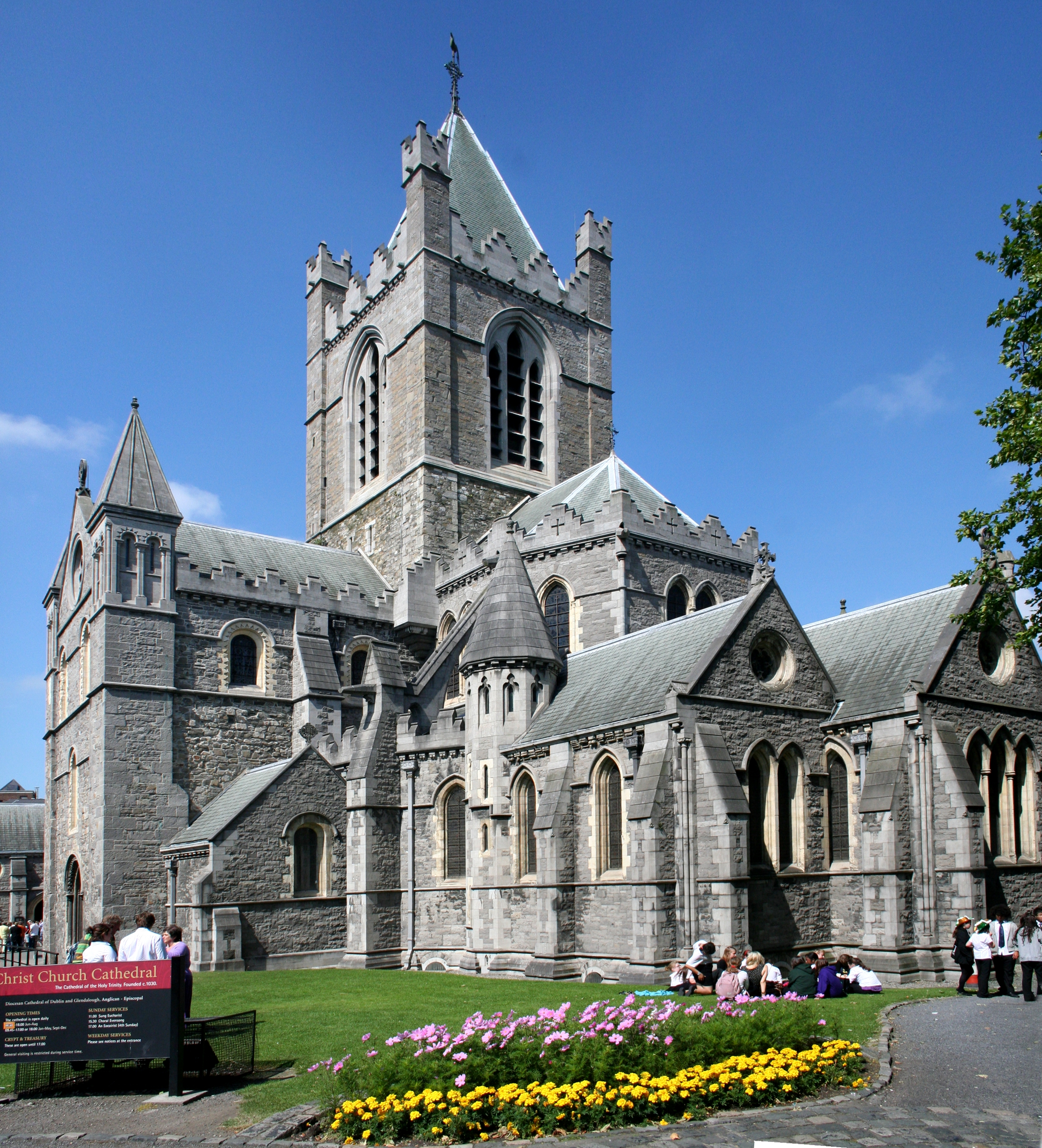

- Location within Central Dublin
- 53°20′35″N 06°16′17″W
- Location: Christchurch Pl, Wood Quay, Dublin 8
- Country: Ireland
- Denomination: Church of Ireland
- Previous denomination: Roman Catholic
- Churchmanship: High Church
- Website: www.christchurchcathedral.ie

History
- Founded: c. 1030
- Founder: Sigtrygg Silkbeard
- Dedication: Holy Trinity

Architecture
- Style: Gothic/Romanesque

Administration
- Province: Dublin
- Diocese: Diocese of Dublin and Glendalough
- Parish: Christ Church Cathedral

Clergy
- Archbishop: Michael Jackson
- Dean: Thomas O'Brien

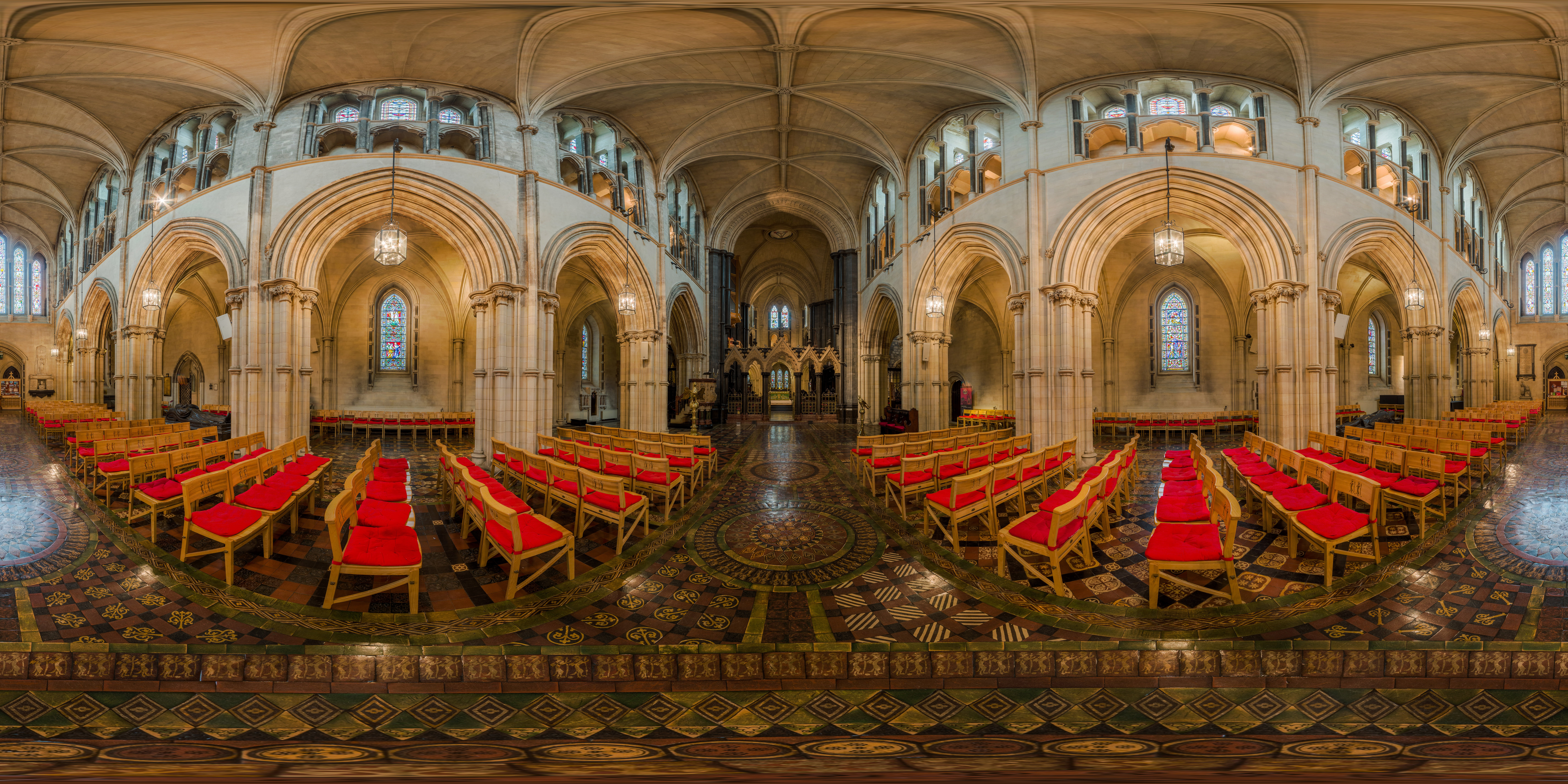
Spherical photo of cathedral nave (view as a 360° interactive panorama)

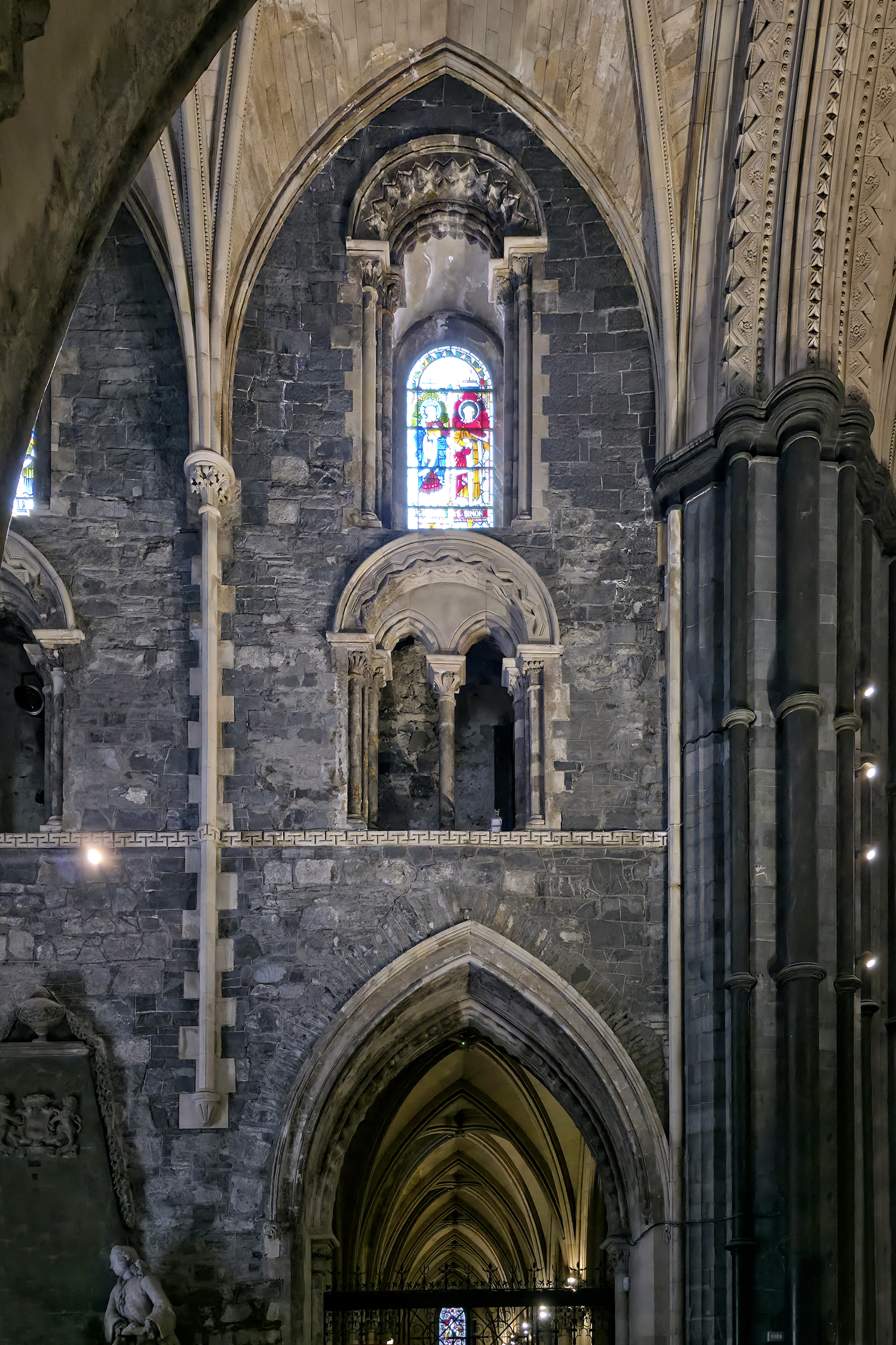
Romanesque South Transept Elevation dating from Early Norman Period

Christ Church Cathedral, more formally The Cathedral of the Holy Trinity (Irish: Ardeaglais Theampall Chríost), is the cathedral of the United Dioceses of Dublin and Glendalough and the cathedral of the ecclesiastical province of the United Provinces of Dublin and Cashel in the (Anglican) Church of Ireland. It is situated in Dublin, Ireland, and is the elder of the capital city's two medieval cathedrals, the other being St Patrick's Cathedral.

The cathedral was founded in the early 11th century under the Viking king Sitric Silkenbeard. It was rebuilt in stone in the late 12th century under the Norman potentate Strongbow, and considerably enlarged in the early 13th century, using Somerset stones and craftsmen. A partial collapse in the 16th century left it in poor shape and the building was extensively renovated and rebuilt in the late 19th century, giving it the form it has today, including the tower, flying buttresses, and distinctive covered footbridge.

== Overview and history ==
=== Overview ===
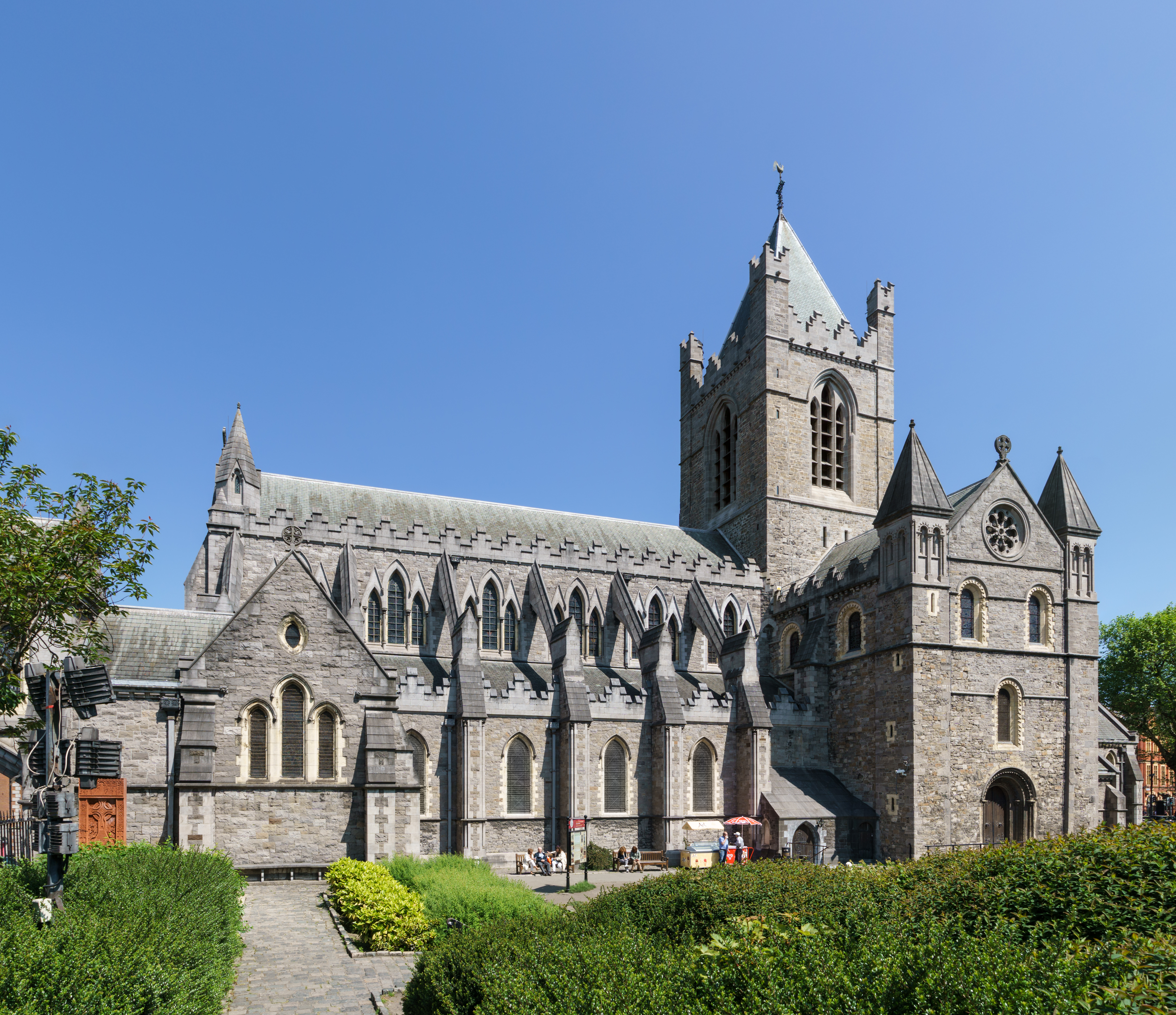
Christ Church Cathedral – Dublin

In law, and in fact, it has been the cathedral of only the Church of Ireland's Archbishop of Dublin since the Irish Reformation. Though nominally claiming Christ Church as his cathedral, the Roman Catholic Archbishop of Dublin used St Mary's in Marlborough Street in Dublin as his pro-cathedral (acting cathedral). (Note: Periodically, it was suggested that the Catholic Church intended to "downgrade" Christ Church to parish church level (i.e. to effectively acknowledge that the Church no longer regards it as its cathedra) and to either upgrade St Mary's to full cathedral status or to build a new cathedral. Until the 1970s, the park in the centre of Merrion Square was the planned site for the new cathedral but that location was instead given on a long lease to Dublin City Council. From 1974 to 2010, it was known as "Archbishop Ryan Park" after Archbishop Dermot Ryan, who made the gift to the people of Dublin.) In November 2025, however, Pope Leo XIV designated St Mary's as Dublin's official Catholic cathedral.

Christ Church Cathedral is located in the former heart of medieval Dublin, next to Wood Quay at the end of Lord Edward Street. However, a major dual carriageway building scheme around it separated it from the original medieval street pattern which once surrounded it, with its original architectural context (at the centre of a maze of small buildings and streets) lost due to road-building and the demolition of the older residential quarter at Wood Quay. As a result, the cathedral now appears dominant in isolation behind new civil offices along the quays, out of its original medieval context. The cathedral is used as the setting for filming from time to time.

=== First cathedral ===
The cathedral was founded probably sometime after 1028 when King Sitric Silkenbeard, the Hiberno-Norse king of Dublin made a pilgrimage to Rome. The first bishop of this new Dublin diocese was Dúnán or Donat, and the diocese was at that time a small island of land surrounded by the much larger Diocese of Glendalough, and was for a time answerable to Canterbury rather than to the Irish Church hierarchy. The church was built on the high ground overlooking the Viking settlement at Wood Quay and Sitric gave the "lands of Baldoyle, Raheny and Portrane for its maintenance." Of the four old Celtic Christian churches reputed to have existed around Dublin, only one, dedicated to St. Martin of Tours, lay within the walls of the Viking city, and so Christ Church was one of just two churches for the whole city.

The cathedral was originally staffed by secular clergy. The second Bishop of Dublin introduced the Benedictines. In 1163, Christ Church was converted to a priory of the Regular Order of Arrosian Canons (Reformed Augustinian Rule) by the second Archbishop of Dublin, later saint, Laurence O'Toole, who adhered to the rule himself; it was subsequently headed by an Augustinian prior, who ranked as the second ecclesiastical figure of the diocese until the dissolution of the monasteries in 1541, at which time the cathedral became a secular cathedral with a dean and chapter based on the constitution of neighbouring St Patrick's. This priory, the Priory of the Holy Trinity, became the wealthiest religious house in Ireland, holding over 10,000 acres (40 km^{2}) of property in County Dublin alone, most notable of which were the three home farms held at Grangegorman, Glasnevin and Clonken or Clonkene, now known as Deansgrange.

=== Norman period ===
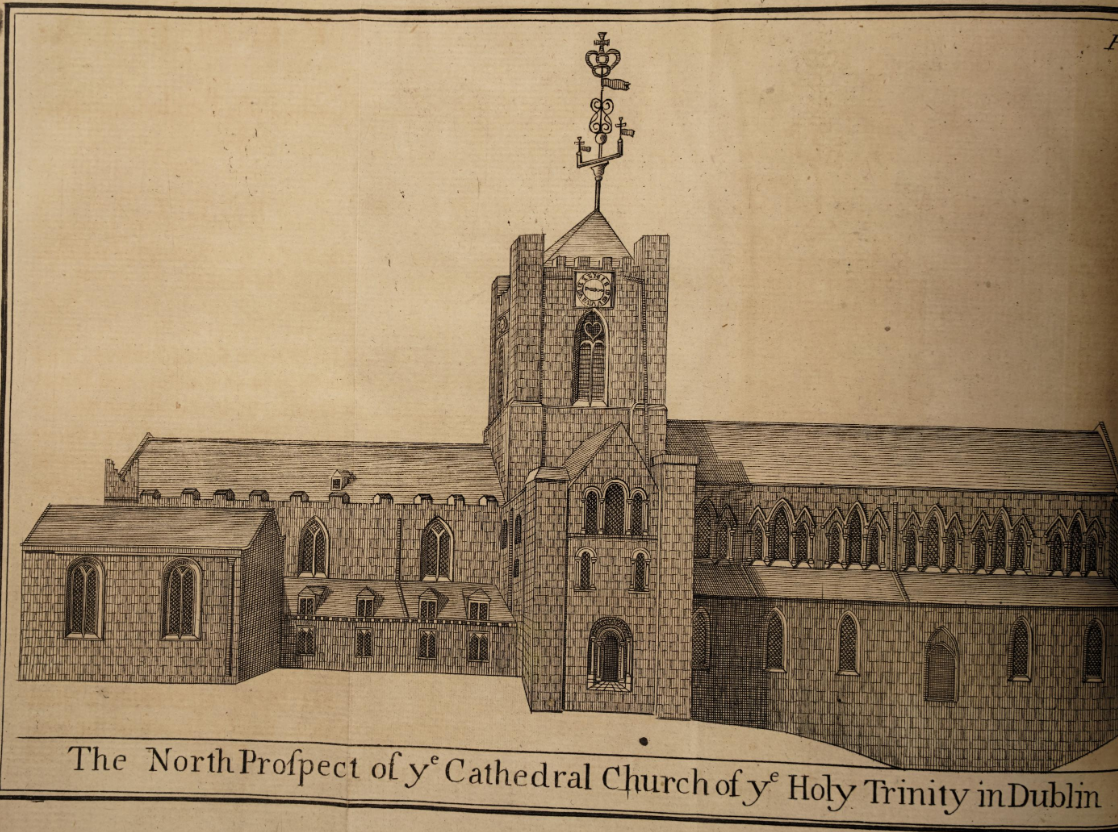
Christ Church Cathedral, c. 1739, by Jonas Blaymire

Henry II attended the Christmas service at the cathedral in 1171. According to the cathedral guidebook, this was the first time Henry received Holy Communion following the murder of Thomas Becket by Henry's knights in Canterbury in 1170.

In the 1180s, Strongbow and other Norman magnates helped to fund a complete rebuilding of Christ Church, initially a wooden building, in stone, comprising the construction of a choir, choir aisles and transepts, the crypt and chapels to St. Edmund and St. Mary and St. Lô.

A chapel to St Laurence O'Toole was added in the 13th century and much of the extant nave was built in the 1230s. Its design was inspired by the architecture of the English western school of Gothic, and its wrought stones – of a Somersetshire oolite from quarries in Dundry – were sculpted and laid by craftsmen from the same area.

In 1300 Richard de Ferings, Archbishop of Dublin arranged an agreement between the two cathedrals, the Pacis Compostio, which acknowledged both as cathedrals and made some provisions to accommodate their shared status (see below for more on this).

In the 1350s a major extension was undertaken by John de St Paul, Archbishop of Dublin, 1349–1362. By 1358, the nave of the cathedral was partly in use for secular purposes and a "long quire" was added, extending the old choir area by around 10 metres. St Paul also installed an organ. His works were destroyed by the major rebuilding project in the 1870s. He was buried under the high altar.

In 1480 the wealthy judge William Sutton bequeathed all his lands and silver to the cathedral.

The cathedral was the location of the purported coronation, in 1487, of Lambert Simnel, a boy pretender who sought unsuccessfully to depose Henry VII of England, as "King Edward VI".

The choir school was founded in 1493.

=== Reformation period ===
As part the dissolution of the Irish monasteries, King Henry VIII by Royal Warrant of 12 December 1539 abolished the Priory of the Holy Trinity. The Prior and Canons of Holy Trinity were transformed into secular clergy, to be known as the Dean and Chapter of Christ Church. So, Robert Paynswick or Penswick, alias Castell, Prior, and Richard Ball, Sub-Prior, became Dean and Precentor respectively, whilst Walter White, Seneschal and Precentor, became Chancellor and Vicar-Choral, and John Moss, Sub-Precentor [Succentor] and Sacristan, Treasurer and Vicar-Choral of the new foundation. Thus the last Augustinian Prior (Robert Paynswick) became the first Dean of Christ Church, though the process of conversion actually continued in 1540 and 1542, finishing with a Chapter of eight clergy.

Henry VIII's immediate successor, Edward VI, in 1547, provided funds for an increase in cathedral staffing and annual royal funding for the choir school.

King Edward VI formally suppressed St Patrick's Cathedral and, on 25 April 1547, its silver, jewels and ornaments were transferred to the dean and chapter of Christ Church. This episode ended with a late document of Queen Mary's reign, a deed dated 27 April 1558, comprising a release or receipt by Thomas Leverous, dean, and the chapter of St Patrick's, of the "goods, chattels, musical instruments, etc." belonging to that cathedral and which had been in the possession of the dean and chapter of Christ Church.

Queen Mary I, and later King James I, also increased Christ Church's endowment. Meanwhile, in 1551, divine service was sung for the first time in Ireland in English instead of Latin. In 1560, the Bible was first read in English.

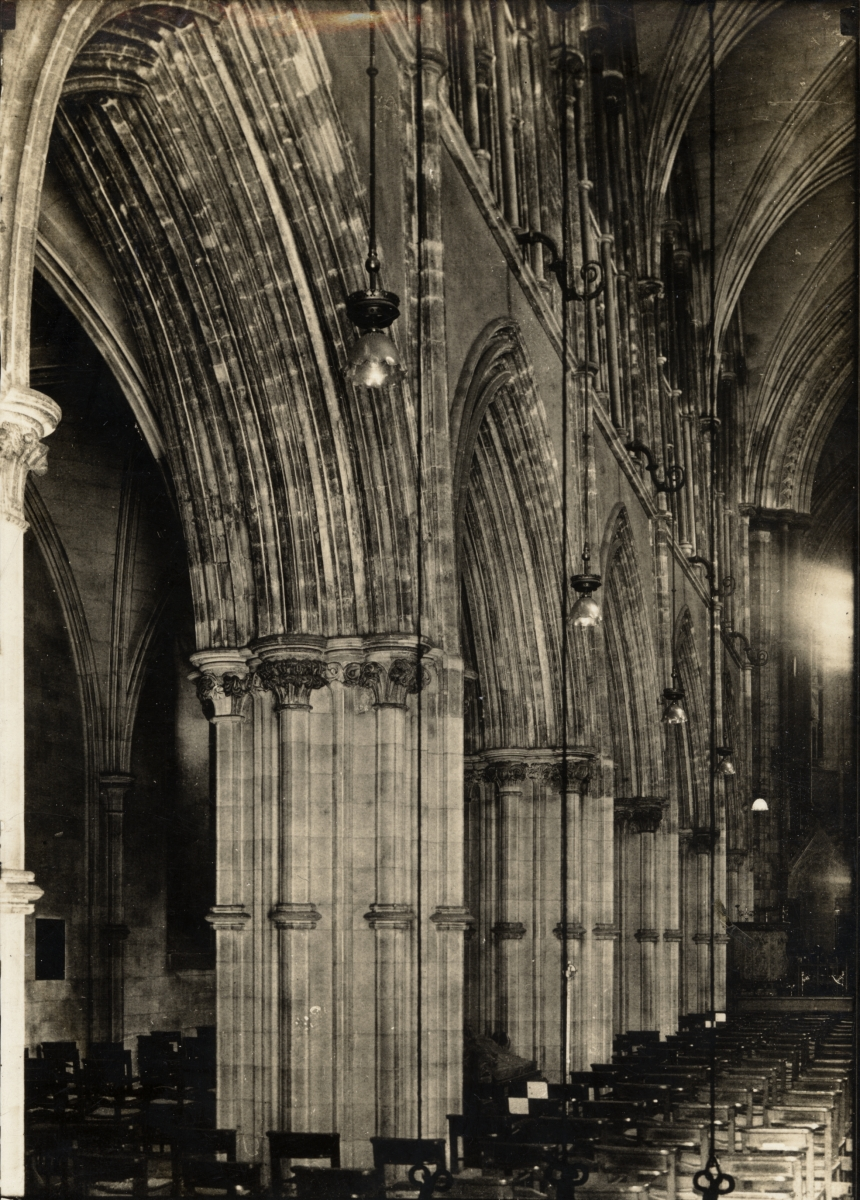
Christ Church Cathedral, 1914

=== Kingdom of Ireland ===
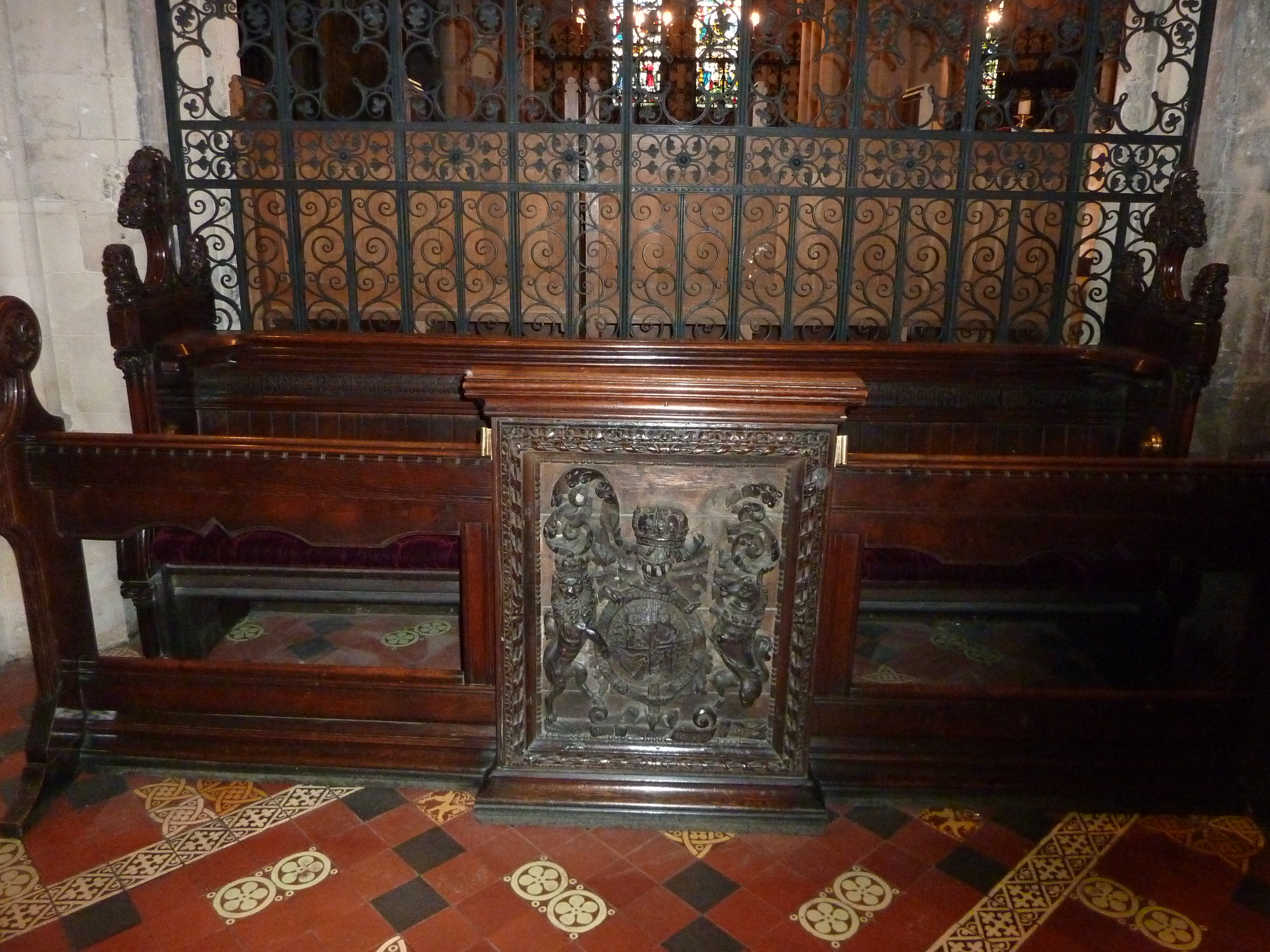
Royal pew, Christ Church Cathedral, Dublin

The foundations of the nave, resting in peat, slipped in 1562, bringing down the south wall and the arched stone roof (the north wall, which visibly leans, survived, and largely dates back to 1230). Partial repairs were carried out but much of the debris was simply levelled and new flooring was built over it until 1871. In 1620 the English-born judge Luke Gernon observed that Christchurch was in a better state of repair than St. Patrick's; he does not seem to have been overly impressed by either.

In the 17th century, both parliament and the law courts met in buildings erected alongside Christ Church. King James II himself presided over a state opening of parliament in that location. However, parliament and the law courts both moved elsewhere: the law courts to the newly built Four Courts on the riverfront, and Parliament to Chichester House in Hoggen Green, into the building which is now The Bank of Ireland, College Green.

Like nearby St Patrick's, the building was in poor condition for much of the 19th century. After the building was declared unsafe and no longer fit for use, some limited works were carried out by Matthew Price (architect) between 1829 and 1831.

=== 19th and 20th centuries ===
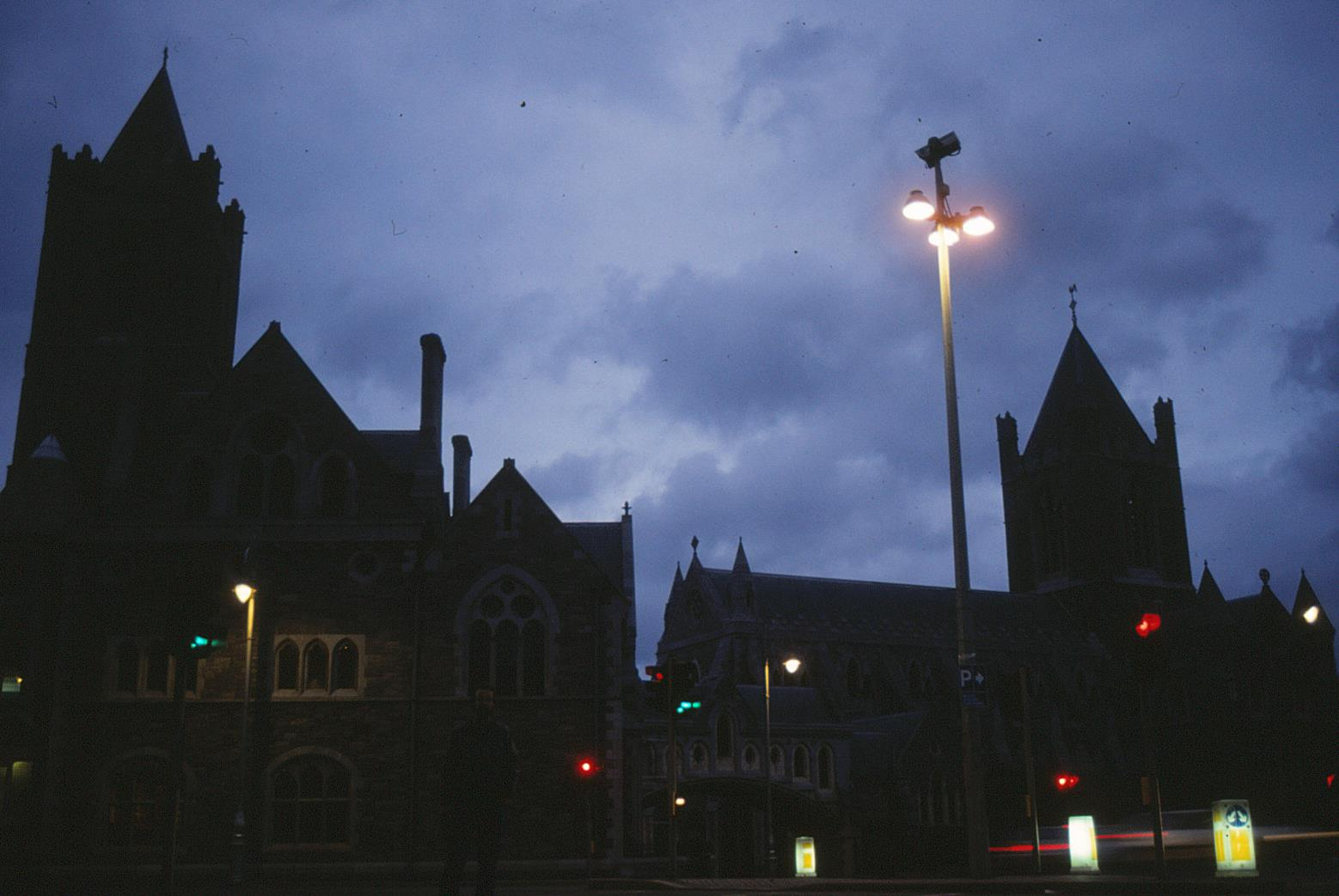
The cathedral's night-time silhouette as it appeared in the 1990s

The cathedral and Synod Hall were extensively renovated and rebuilt from 1871 to 1878 by George Edmund Street, with the sponsorship of the whiskey distiller Henry Roe of Mount Anville. The renovations cost Roe in the region of £250,000. Wyse Jackson notes that Roe may have been trying to "outdo" Benjamin Lee Guinness the brewer, who some years earlier in 1864 had privately funded the restoration of nearby St Patrick's Cathedral.

This episode in the cathedral's history was recorded in an 1890 guidebook to Dublin, produced as part of the Thorough Guides series:

Layout plan of Christ Church Cathedral

...Of that building, however, we know that a very large part had disappeared by the middle of the 16th century, and from then down to about 1830 neglect and injudicious repairs had done their worst. In 1830–34 more or less extensive restoration took place, but only to be followed by a further period of neglect, and at the time of the disestablishment of the Irish Church in 1869 things were at so low an ebb that it was seriously contemplated to hand over the building to the Roman Catholics. In 1871, however, Mr. H. Roe, the whisky distiller, came to the rescue and undertook the works pronounced necessary by the late Mr. Street, which were estimated to cost £16,000. From that sprung an outlay which eventually reached £185,000 for the cathedral, £15,000 for the adjoining synod-house, and £22,000 endowment, all provided by the same donor, who unhappily proved to have overtaxed his means.

The great 14th-century choir was demolished and a new eastern end was built over the original crypt. He built a new chapter house. The tower was rebuilt. The south nave arcade was rebuilt. The flying buttresses were added as a decorative feature. The north porch was removed. The baptistry was built in its place. Street built the adjacent Synod Hall, taking in the last remnant of St Michael and All Angels's Church, including the bell tower. The synod house is linked to the cathedral by Street's iconic covered footbridge. Roe spent over £230,000 at the time (over €26 million in 2006 terms). Further renovations were carried out, notably between 1980 and 1982.

== Role ==
Christ Church is the centre of worship for the united dioceses and holds notable annual events such as the Citizenship Service. As the cathedral of the southern province of the Church of Ireland, it also hosts ordinations of priests and consecrations of bishops.

== Architecture ==
=== Impact of the restoration ===
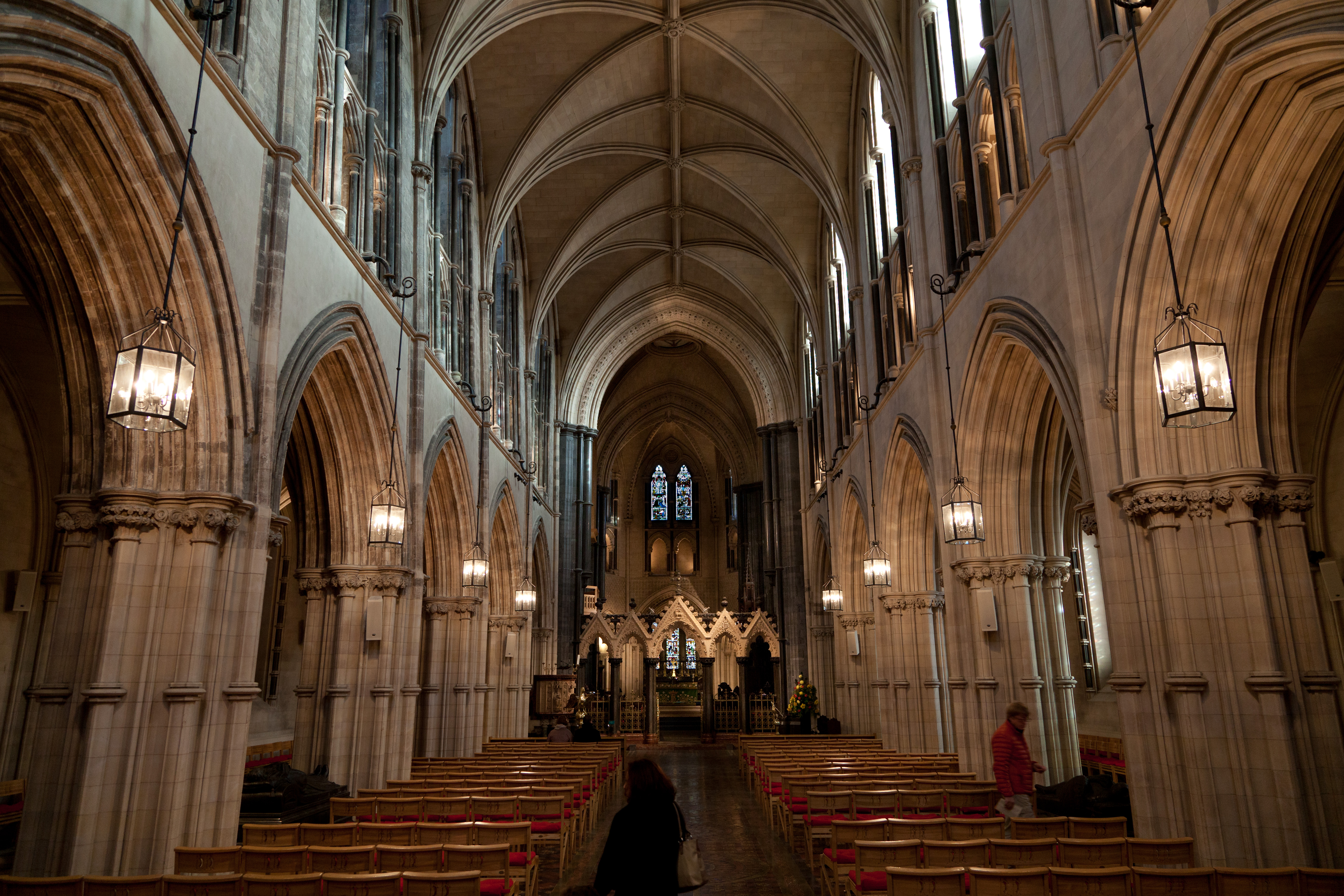
Interior of the cathedral

The extensive renovation in Victorian times preserved the seriously decayed structure from collapse, but it is now difficult to tell which parts of the interior are medieval and which parts are Victorian pastiche. Photographs of the exterior show the extent of the Victorian rebuilding: Archbishop de St Paul's 14th-century cathedral, in particular, the "long choir", was almost entirely destroyed. As a result, Christ Church is a mixture of surviving medieval and later church building.

=== Stonework ===
Patrick Wyse Jackson, curator of the Geological Museum in Trinity College, assessed the building in 1993 as part of his book "The Building Stones of Dublin: A Walking Guide" and made the following observations:

The present cathedral, which is noted for its crypts, was begun in 1172 by the Normans, whose stonemasons used locally quarried Calp Limestone from Lucan, and an imported oolitic limestone from Dundry Hill near Bristol, which they used around the doors and windows. The remains of the chapter house of the original priory are situated on the southern side of the cathedral site. Here the various rock types may be examined at close quarters using a hand lens.

A much wider array of stones were employed during the late-1800s restoration of the cathedral, as detailed by Wyse Jackson:

The cathedral was restored (actually nearly rebuilt) by the architect George Street in 1878. He used Calp Limestone from Kimmage and Rathgar for the walls, and faced them with limestones from Ardbraccan, Co. Meath, and Sheephouse, near Drogheda, Co. Louth. These latter stones were also used for dressings and carvings. The cathedral was reslated with olive green slates from Eureka in America. However, these were replaced around twenty years ago (1973) with green Westmorland slate. Examples of the American slates remain on the tower and south-west turret of the Synod Hall... Restored portions of the cathedral are easy to pick out. The blocks are usually ashlared and well pointed. The two most eastern windows on the south-facing aisle wall have replacement architraves, which differ in colour from the other windows of the wall. In 1982, some deteriorated stonework was replaced with limestone from Lecarrow, near Tullamore, Co. Offaly.

=== Nave ===
The cathedral contains the reputed tomb of Strongbow, a medieval Norman-Welsh peer and warlord who came to Ireland at the request of King Diarmuid MacMorrough and whose arrival marked the beginning of Anglo-Norman involvement in Ireland. According to the Christ Church Cathedral website, in 1562 the nave roof vaulting collapsed and Strongbow's tomb was smashed; the current tomb is a contemporary replacement from Drogheda. As is well documented from a number of sources, the tomb of Strongbow was used as the venue for legal agreements from the 16th to the 18th centuries. Alongside the main tomb is a smaller figure with sloping shoulders, suggesting a female figure, but wearing chain mail, which may indicate that it was a child.

=== Crypt ===
Plan of the crypt

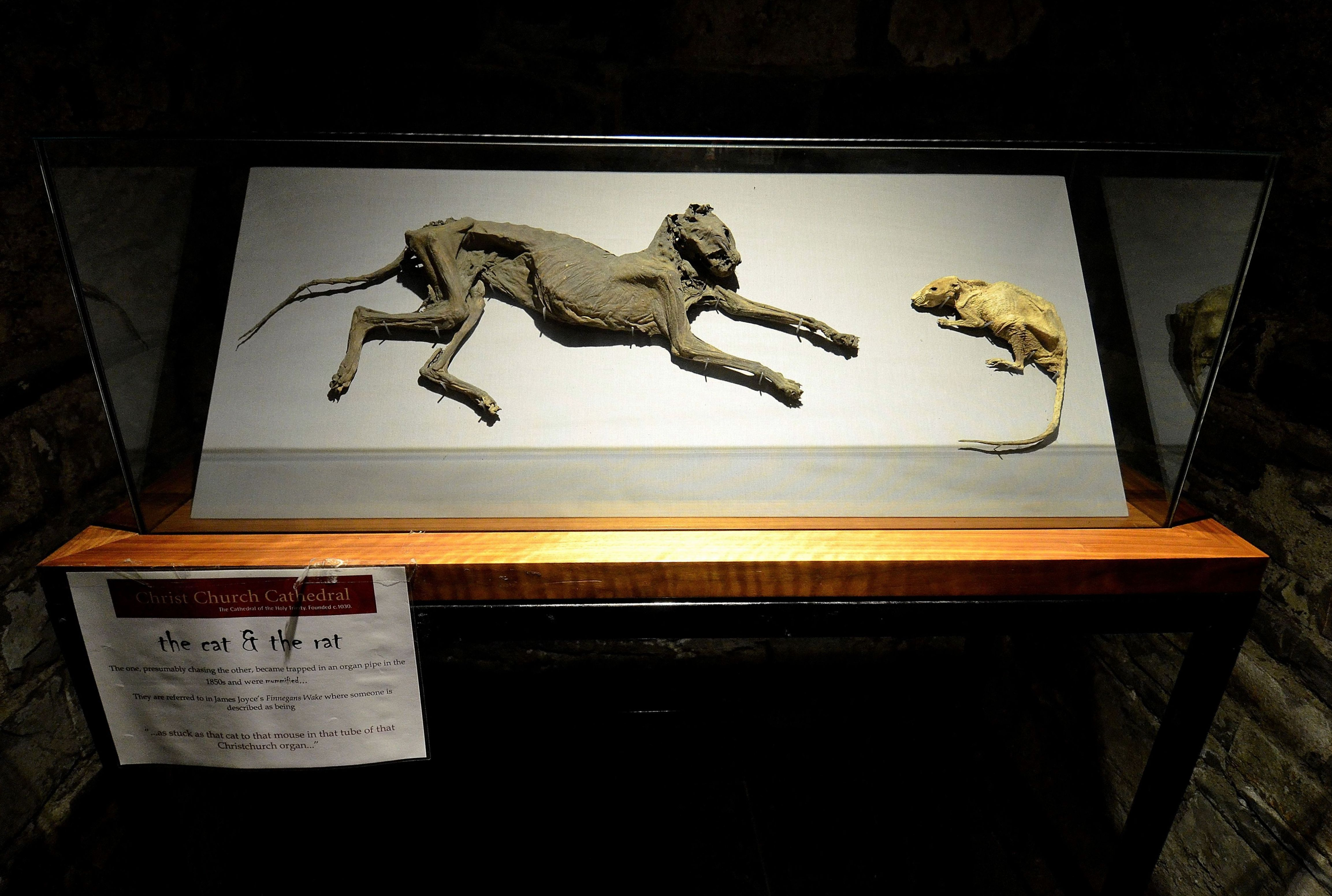
The mummified cat and rat in the crypt

Christ Church also contains the largest cathedral crypt (63.4m long) in Britain or Ireland, constructed in 1172–1173. Having been renovated in the early 2000s, it is now open for visitors.

The crypt contains various monuments and historical features, including:

- the oldest known secular carvings in Ireland, two carved statues that until the late 18th century stood outside the Tholsel (Dublin's medieval city hall, which was demolished in 1806)
- a tabernacle and set of candlesticks which were used when the cathedral last operated (for a very short time) under the "Roman rite", when the Roman Catholic king, James II, having fled England in 1690, came to Ireland to fight for his throne and attended High Mass in the temporary restoration of Christ Church as a Roman Catholic cathedral.
- the stocks, formerly in Christ Church Place, made in 1670 and used for the punishment of offenders before the Court of the Dean's Liberty (the small area under the cathedral's exclusive civic authority), moved here in 1870
- historic books and altar goods of the Cathedral
- "The Cat & The Rat" are displayed with an explanatory note.

=== Chapter house ===
Behind the altar area, there is the chapter house, which contains cathedral offices, meeting rooms and other facilities.

=== Synod hall and bridge ===
At the west end of the cathedral is a fully integrated stone bridge, leading to the former synod hall, which was built on the site of St Michael's, a prebendal church of Christ Church which was demolished by Street during his restoration of the cathedral. This hall, which incorporates the old St Michael's tower, was formerly used for hosting general synods and diocesan synods for Dublin, Glendalough and Kildare. It is now home to the "Dublinia" exhibition about medieval Dublin.

== Status ==
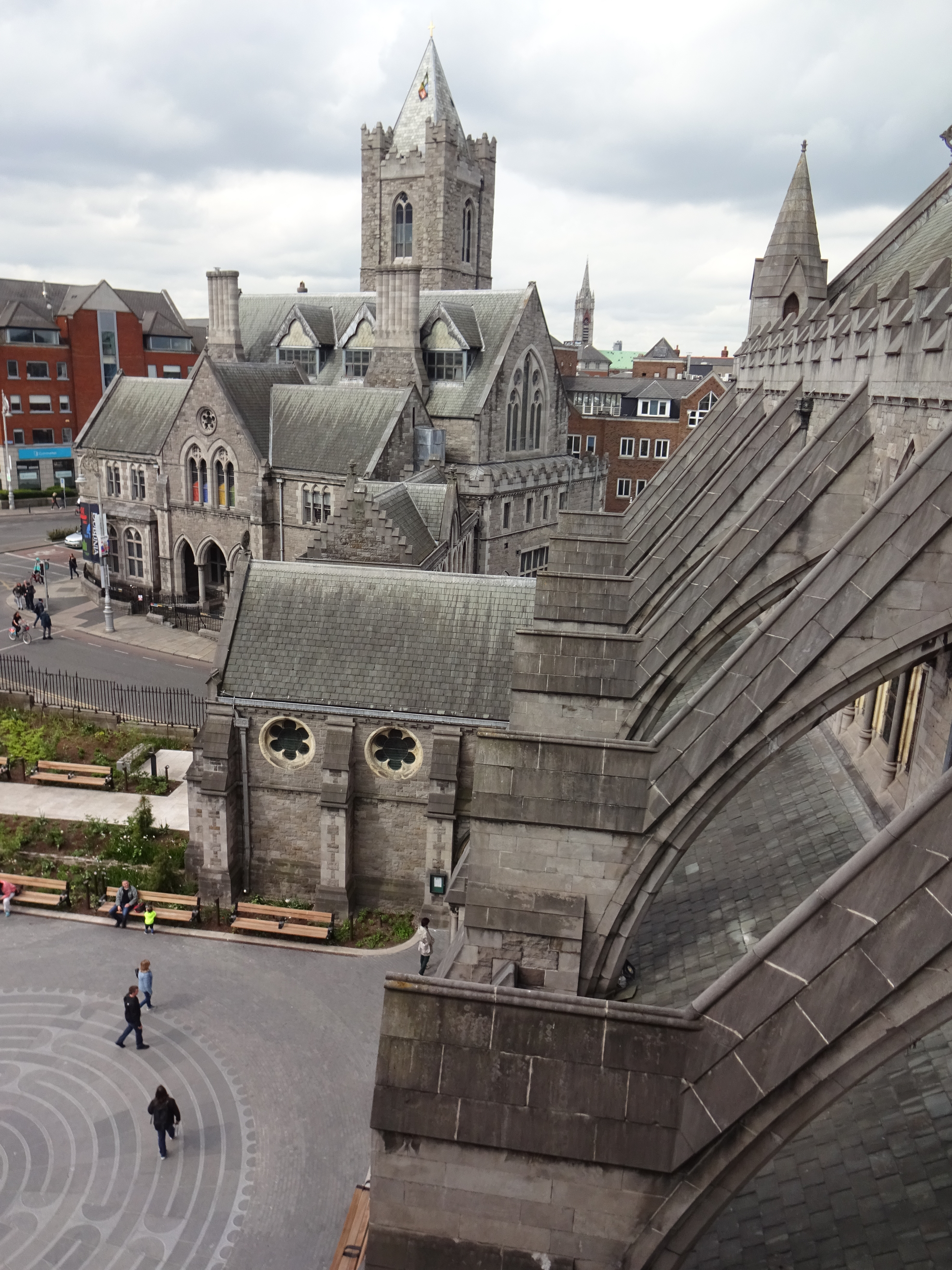
View from the Bell Tower, showing the Chapter House in the background

=== Two cathedral issue ===
For most of their common history, both Christ Church and St Patrick's held the status of cathedral for the Dublin diocese, a rare arrangement which only ended following the move to disestablish the Church of Ireland. In early times, there was considerable conflict over status but under the six-point agreement of 1300, Pacis Compositio, still extant, and in force until 1870:

- The consecration and enthronement of the Archbishop of Dublin was to take place at Christ Church – records show that this provision was not always followed, with many archbishops enthroned in both and at least two in St Patrick's only
- Christ Church had formal precedence, as the mother and senior cathedral of the diocese
- Christ Church was to retain the cross, mitre and ring of each deceased Archbishop of Dublin
- Deceased Archbishops of Dublin were to be buried alternately in each of the two cathedrals unless they personally willed otherwise
- The annual consecration of chrism oil for the diocese was to take place at Christ Church
- The two cathedrals were to act as one and shared equally in their freedoms

The 1868 Church Commissioners' report proposed making St Patrick's the sole cathedral and reducing Christ Church to a parish church.

=== Roman Catholicism ===
The seat of the Roman Catholic Archbishop of Dublin, St Mary's, was known as a "pro-cathedral" in acknowledgement of the fact that the Holy See claimed Christ Church as the rightful seat of the Roman Catholic archbishop. In November 2025, however, Pope Leo XIV designated St Mary's as Dublin's official Catholic cathedral.

== Governance and staffing ==
=== Dean and chapter ===
The dean and chapter, with the consent of the Archbishop of Dublin, preside over the cathedral, with the dean as "first among equals" in the chapter but holding a day-to-day authority, subject to the special roles of some other figures (the dean and chapter together are in a similar position to a rector of a parish).

The chapter comprises the dean, precentor (who must be skilled in music), chancellor, treasurer, Archdeacons of Dublin and Glendalough and 12 canons, eight being clergy of the Diocese of Dublin and four clergy of the Diocese of Glendalough (the three most senior in order of appointment are known as the Prebendary of St Michael's, Prebendary of St Michan's and the Prebendary of St John's).

The dean is appointed by the Archbishop of Dublin and, in an arrangement commenced in 1971, is also incumbent of the Christ Church Cathedral Group of Parishes, the day-to-day care of which is in the hands of a vicar appointed by a special board of patronage.

The dean can appoint a deputy and also appoints the cathedral verger. The dean and chapter together appoint the precentor, while the other members of the chapter are appointed by the archbishop.

=== Board ===
Having been historically governed by its clerical chapter alone, since 1872 the cathedral has been operationally overseen by a board comprising nine clerical members (the dean, precentor, two clerical vicars and five other clerics) and nine lay members, elected every third annual Easter vestry. The board has the power to appoint and remove officers of the cathedral other than those whose appointment is vested in the archbishop, or the dean and chapter, or dean, to regulate salaries and to manage financial matters. The board is in a similar position to a select vestry of a parish.

The board has committees – mid-2007, these are administration and finance, culture (including the treasury), deanery, fabric, fundraising, health and safety, information technology, music, safeguarding trust and tower.

=== Other clergy ===
There is a dean's vicar (and clerk of the chapter), a vicar of the Cathedral Group of Parishes and posts for a curate assistant and a student reader. There are also usually honorary clerical vicars.

== Music ==
Christ Church has a long musical history, with a well-known cathedral choir and a girls' choir. Along with the precentor, the musical side of its work is led by the "Organist and Director of Music", working with any assistant organist and organ scholar, as well as the "Honorary Keeper of the Music and Music Librarian" and, As of 2007, a "Music Development Officer".

=== List of organists ===
- 1595 John Fermor
- 1608 Thomas Bateson
- 1631 Randal Jewett
- 1639 Benjamin Rogers
- 1646 John Hawkshaw
- 1688 Thomas Godfrey
- 1689 Thomas Morgan
- 1692 Peter Isaac
- 1694 Thomas Finell
- 1698 Daniel Roseingrave
- 1727 Ralph Roseingrave
- 1747 George Walsh
- 1765 Richard Woodward
- 1777 Samuel Murphy
- 1780 Langrishe Doyle
- 1805 William Warren
- 1816 Francis Robinson
- 1834 John Robinson
- 1844 Sir Robert Prescott Stewart
- 1894 John Horan
- 1906 James Fitzgerald
- 1913 Charles Herbert Kitson
- 1920 Thomas Henry Weaving
- 1950 Leslie Henry Bret Reed
- 1955 Arnold Thomas McKiernan
- 1980 Peter Sweeney
- 1992 Mark Duley
- 2003 Judy Martin
- 2010 Judith Gannon (Locum)
- 2012 Ian Keatley
- 2020 Tom Little

== Bells ==
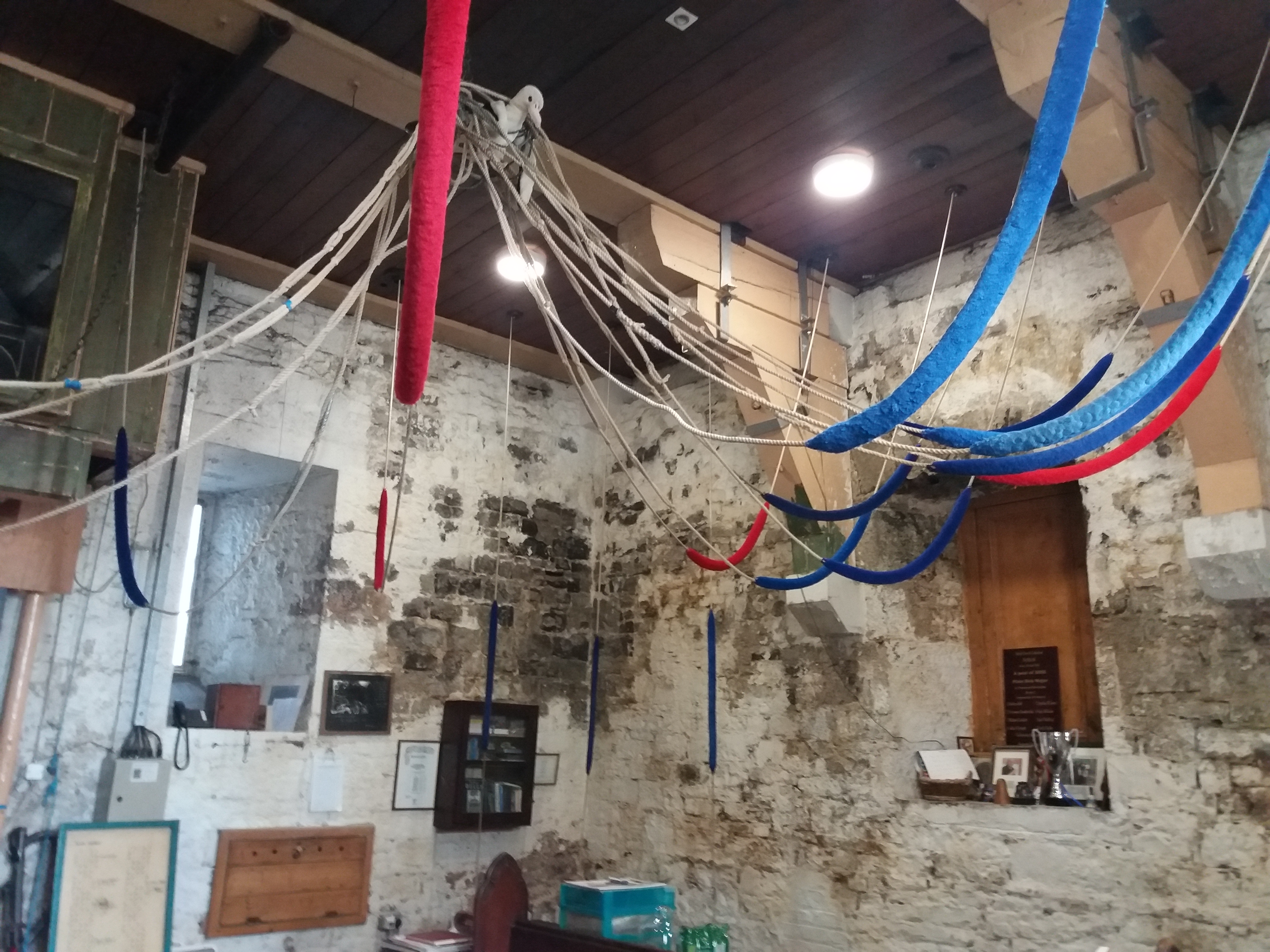
A view of the ringing room, showing the numerous ropes and sallies

Christ Church Cathedral probably had at least one ringing bell from its foundation. By 1440 there were known to be three great bells in the tower; however, on 11 March 1597, an accidental gunpowder explosion on one of the nearby quays damaged the tower and caused the bells to crack. The effects of this blast also damaged the tower nearby of St. Audoen's Church.

In 1670, six new bells were cast for the tower from cannon metal. These were recast and augmented to eight in 1738 by Abel Rudhall. In the 1840s, several of the bells were recast by John Murphy of Dublin. In the 1860s and 1870s, the bells were gradually recast and augmented to twelve by John J. Murphy, his son, with a tenor weight of 36 hundredweight in the key of B. The tenor was recast in 1979.

The most recent augmentation was in 1999 when an additional seven bells were added to the ring, giving a grand total of 20 bells – 19 swinging bells (the world's highest number of change ringing bells) and one chiming bell, cast by the Rudhalls. Although this does not produce a diatonic scale of 19 notes, it does uniquely provide a choice of combinations: three different 12-bell peals (in the keys of B, C# and F#) as well as 14 and 16-bell peals. At the time of the augmentation, this was only the second 16 full circle bell peal in the world – St Martin-in-the-Bullring in Birmingham being the first – and is now one of three rings of 16, along with the Swan Bells in Perth, Western Australia.

They are regularly rung on tower tours and on Sunday for Sung Eucharist and Choral Evensong, with a ringing practice on Friday nights.

== Archives and publications ==
Christ Church has a range of historical archives and has arranged for a number of publications over the years, as well as maintaining a website since the 1990s. This work is overseen by, among others, the "Honorary Keeper of the Archives" and the honorary secretary of Christ Church Publications, Ltd.

== Access ==
As Christ Church receives no regular state support, while it welcomes all guests and has a chapel for those who simply wish to pray, there are fees for sightseeing, which can also be paid in combination with the purchase of a ticket for the neighbouring "Dublinia" exhibition. There is a gift shop with souvenirs, recordings of cathedral music groups and publications.

== Media usage ==
In recent years, the cathedral has been used as a set for medieval dramas such as the CW's drama Reign and The Tudors. A number of dresses and outfits worn by Maria Doyle Kennedy (playing Catherine of Aragon) and Jonathan Rhys Myers (King Henry VIII) are displayed within the cathedral crypt.

== Group of parishes ==
In 1971, the general synod, following prior discussions, created the "Christ Church Cathedral Group of Parishes", uniting what were then four parishes with the cathedral, whose dean is their rector: St Andrew's, St Werburgh's, All Saints (Grangegorman) and St Michan's, St Paul and St Mary. The parishes are overseen day-to-day by a vicar appointed by a special board of patronage.

== Burials ==
- The heart of Lorcán Ua Tuathail (Saint Laurence O'Toole / Archbishop of Dublin)
- Richard de Clare, 2nd Earl of Pembroke
- John Comyn (archbishop)
- Thomas Cartwright (bishop)
- John Maxwell (archbishop)
- Stephen de Fulbourn
- John Parker (archbishop)
- Thomas Lindsay (archbishop)
- Henry Leslie (bishop)
- St George Ashe
- Welbore Ellis (bishop)
- John Garvey (archbishop)
- John de St Paul (archbishop)
- James Barry, 1st Baron Barry of Santry
- James FitzGerald, 1st Duke of Leinster

=== Theft and recovery of the heart of Saint Laurence O'Toole ===
On 3 March 2012, the heart of Lorcán Ua Tuathail (Saint Laurence O'Toole, Archbishop of Dublin) was stolen from the cathedral. In April 2018, the heart was recovered in Phoenix Park, by Irish police following "an intelligence-led investigation".

== See also ==
- List of Gothic Cathedrals in Europe
