= Thames, New Zealand =

Town in Waikato Region, New Zealand

Thames
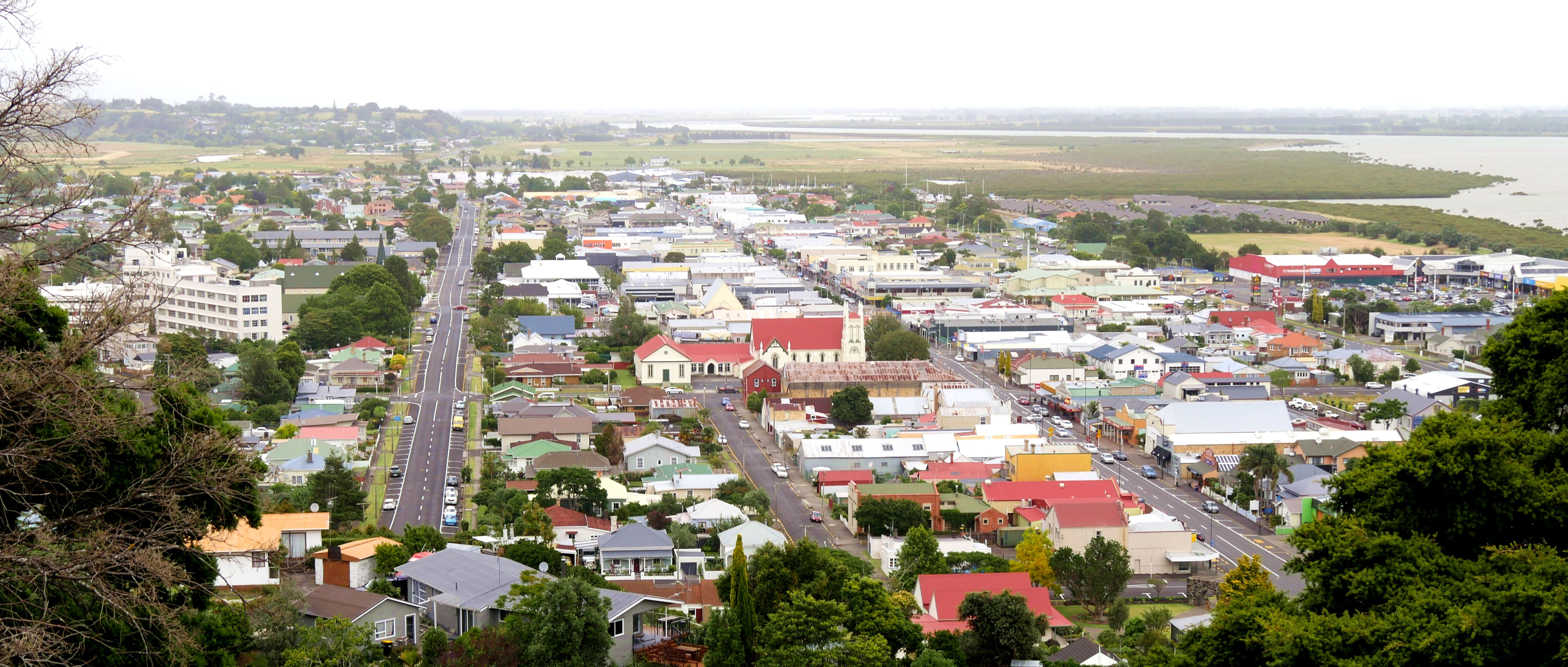
- View from end of Monument Road to the south
- Interactive map of Thames
- Coordinates: 37°8′18.2″S 175°32′25.8″E
- Country: New Zealand
- Region: Waikato Region
- District: Thames-Coromandel District
- Ward: Thames ward
- Community Board: Thames Community
- Electorates: Coromandel; Hauraki-Waikato (Māori)

Government
  - Council: Thames-Coromandel District Council
  - Regional council: Waikato Regional Council
  - Mayor of Thames-Coromandel: Peter Revell
  - Coromandel MP: Scott Simpson
  - Hauraki-Waikato MP: Hana-Rawhiti Maipi-Clarke

Area
  - Total: 16.99 km^{2} (6.56 sq mi)

Population (June 2025)
  - Total: 7,230
  - Density: 426/km^{2} (1,100/sq mi)
- Postcode(s): 3500, 3540

Thames (/tɛmz/) is a town at the southwestern end of the Coromandel Peninsula in New Zealand's North Island. It is located on the Firth of Thames close to the mouth of the Waihou River. The town is the seat of the Thames-Coromandel District Council. The Māori iwi are Ngāti Maru, who are descendants of Marutuahu's son Te Ngako. Ngāti Maru is part of the Marutūāhu confederation of iwi.

Thames had an estimated population of 15,000 in 1870, but this declined to 4,500 in 1881, and it has increased modestly since. It is still the biggest town on the Coromandel Peninsula. Until 2016, a historical oak tree that was planted by Governor George Grey stood on the corner of Grey and Rolleston streets.

== Demographics ==
Thames covers 16.99 km^{2} (6.56 sq mi) and had an estimated population of 7,230 as of June 2025, with a population density of 426 people per km^{2}.

Historical population
Year	Pop.	±% p.a.
2006	6,930	—
2013	6,987	+0.12%
2018	7,344	+1.00%
2023	7,212	−0.36%
The 2006 population is for a smaller area of 15.55 km^{2}. Source:

Thames had a population of 7,212 in the 2023 New Zealand census, a decrease of 132 people (−1.8%) since the 2018 census, and an increase of 225 people (3.2%) since the 2013 census. There were 3,405 males, 3,786 females and 21 people of other genders in 3,132 dwellings. 3.3% of people identified as LGBTIQ+. The median age was 54.9 years (compared with 38.1 years nationally). There were 993 people (13.8%) aged under 15 years, 879 (12.2%) aged 15 to 29, 2,787 (38.6%) aged 30 to 64, and 2,553 (35.4%) aged 65 or older.

People could identify as more than one ethnicity. The results were 82.8% European (Pākehā); 23.1% Māori; 3.2% Pasifika; 6.9% Asian; 0.7% Middle Eastern, Latin American and African New Zealanders (MELAA); and 2.3% other, which includes people giving their ethnicity as "New Zealander". English was spoken by 97.7%, Māori language by 4.8%, Samoan by 0.3%, and other languages by 7.9%. No language could be spoken by 1.2% (e.g. too young to talk). New Zealand Sign Language was known by 0.5%. The percentage of people born overseas was 17.0, compared with 28.8% nationally.

Religious affiliations were 33.2% Christian, 1.3% Hindu, 0.2% Islam, 1.4% Māori religious beliefs, 1.4% Buddhist, 0.7% New Age, and 1.8% other religions. People who answered that they had no religion were 50.8%, and 9.5% of people did not answer the census question.

Of those at least 15 years old, 978 (15.7%) people had a bachelor's or higher degree, 3,189 (51.3%) had a post-high school certificate or diploma, and 2,061 (33.1%) people exclusively held high school qualifications. The median income was $28,700, compared with $41,500 nationally. 345 people (5.5%) earned over $100,000 compared to 12.1% nationally. The employment status of those at least 15 was that 2,136 (34.3%) people were employed full-time, 822 (13.2%) were part-time, and 168 (2.7%) were unemployed.

Individual statistical areas
Name	Area (km^{2})	Population	Density (per km^{2})	Dwellings	Median age	Median income
Thames North	2.63	1,974	751	879	60.0 years	$28,800
Thames Central	1.26	1,068	848	573	58.6 years	$27,100
Thames South	3.28	3,270	997	1,329	51.6 years	$28,600
Totora-Kopu	9.85	903	92	354	51.5 years	$34,000
New Zealand					38.1 years	$41,500

== History and culture ==
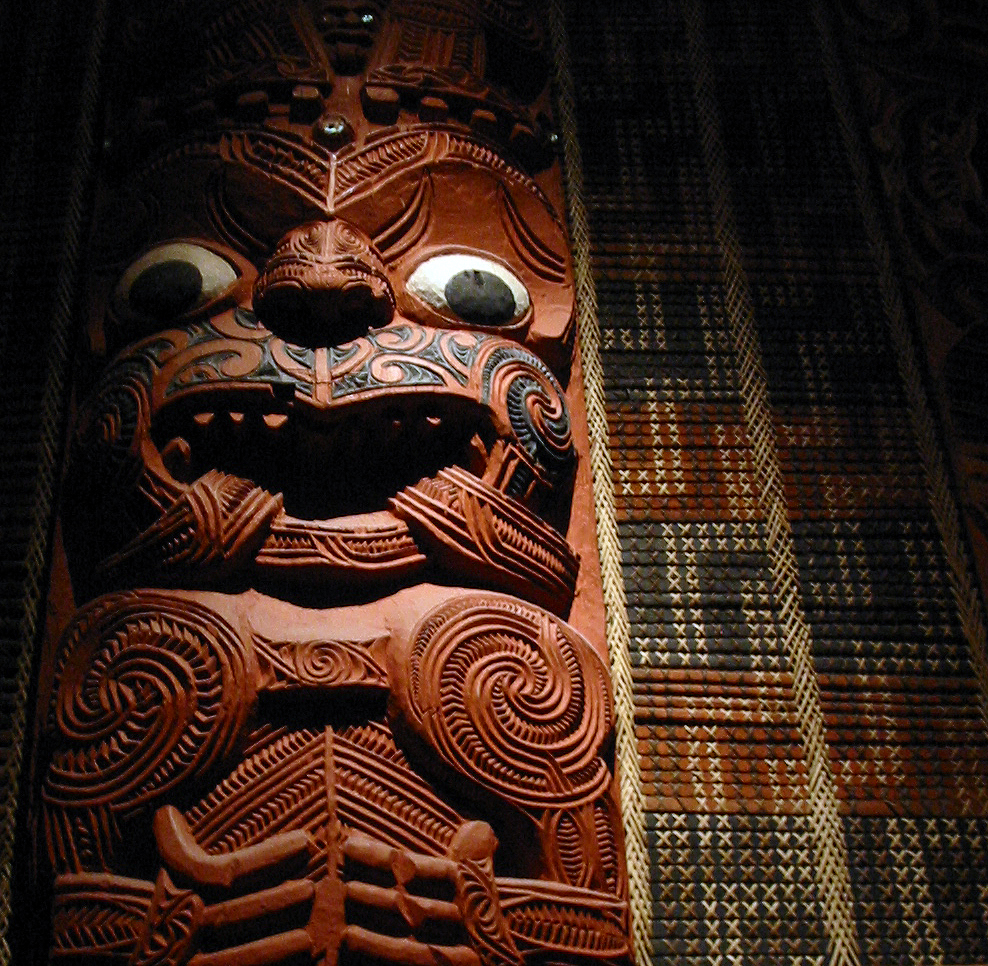
Poupou (wall post) from Hotunui

=== Māori history ===
In the early 19th century the area was populated by Ngāti Maru and other members of the Marutūāhu collective. Ngāti Maru built a large fortified pā between the Kauaeranga River and Waihou River, known as Te Tōtara. In December 1821, this pā was attacked by a Te Tai Tokerau Māori taua (war party) during the Musket Wars. After a frontal assault was unsuccessful, the taua took the pā by stealth.

=== European settlement ===
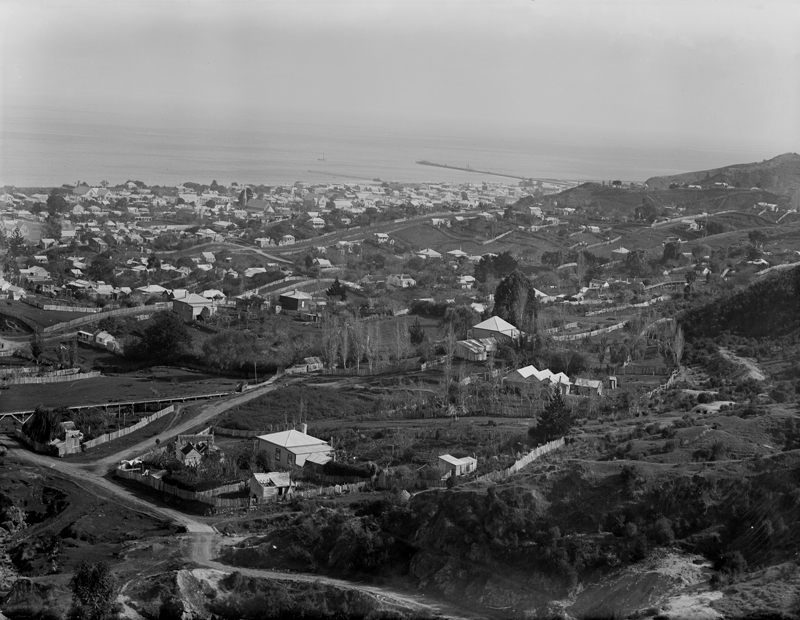
1906 panorama of Thames

Thames was formed from two historic towns, Grahamstown and Shortland, of which many original buildings still stand. Shortland was to the south of Thames and was founded on 27 July 1867 when James Mackay, civil commissioner for the Hauraki District, concluded an agreement with local Māori. The land was rented for mining purposes for the sum of £5,000 per year, a colossal sum in the mid 19th century. This agreement secured the rights to local mineral deposits leading to the proclamation of the Thames Goldfield on 1 August. The leasing of the land for such a huge income was a source of great envy from other Maori iwi and hapū.

Grahamstown was founded the following year at the northern end of present Thames, approximately one mile from Shortland. The two towns merged in 1874 after it emerged the heart of the Goldfield was in Grahamstown. Shortland waned in importance until the turn of the century when the Hauraki Plains were developed for farming and the Shortland railway station was opened.

=== Gold rush ===
The town was initially built during a gold rush, with the first major discovery of gold being made on 10 August 1867 by William Hunt, in the Kuranui Stream at the north end of Thames. The subsequent mine produced more than 102,353oz bullion and was known as the Shotover. The era from 1868 to 1871 were the bonanza years for the town with gold production topping one million pounds sterling at its peak. Official figures for production of the Thames Mines recorded a yield of 2,327,619oz bullion with the value at $845 million. The three richest fields were the Manukau / Golden Crown / Caledonian mines but many others yielded near equivalent amounts. Thames had an estimated population of 15,000 in 1870 which would make it one of the largest cities in New Zealand at the time, but the population had declined to 11,950 (not including Māori) in the 1871 census. The Māori population was 1,428 in 1859. After the gold began to diminish, so did Thames' population, dropping to 5,420 in 1878 and 4,563 in 1881. Thames also benefited from a period of extensive kauri logging in the surrounding ranges around the same time.

The land involved in gold mining in Thames was Māori-owned; important parts of the goldfield were owned by the Ngāti Maru rangatira (chief) Rapana Maunganoa and the Taipari family. In 1878, when Wiremu Hōterene Taipari married a woman of the Ngāti Awa iwi of Whakatāne, Ngāti Awa carvers arrived at Thames and built a meeting house at Pārāwai. It is incorrectly said to have been a wedding gift for the couple when actually Wiremu's father had paid money for another whare (meeting house), which was sold to the governor general at the time. When Wiremu's father returned to collect the whare the Ngāti Awa chief apologised and said he would have another one built which would signify the marriage between Wiremu Taipari and his daughter. The house, named Hotunui in honour of an important Ngāti Maru ancestor, now stands in the Auckland War Memorial Museum.

=== Recent history ===
The Carters - Kopu sawmill, 9 km south of Thames, closed in 2008 with the loss of 145 jobs. In 2012, mayor of Thames-Coromandel called NZTA safety procedures into question when a sinkhole on State Highway 25 north of Thames, opened above an old mine shaft.

=== Marae ===
The Mātai Whetū Marae is located in Kopu. It is a meeting ground for Ngāti Maru and features Te Rama o Hauraki meeting house.

=== Treasury ===
Operating since 2009, The Treasury is an archive and research centre located in the town. The book True Tales of Thames was launched at The Treasury by The Coromandel Heritage Trust.

=== Steampunk ===
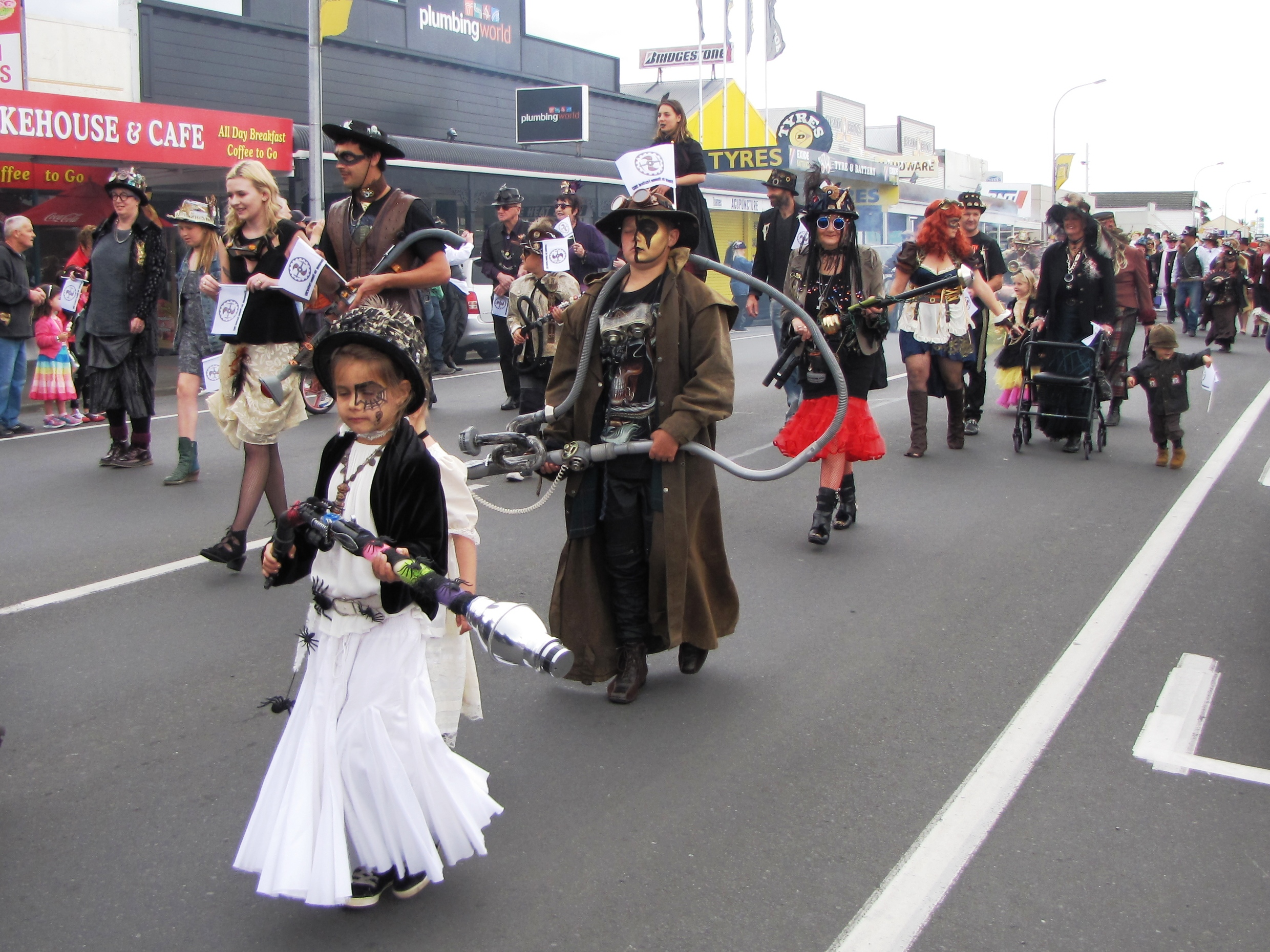
People parading in costume at the Thames steampunk festival

Steampunk has been a community-supported festival in Thames since 2015.

== Local government ==
The area was initially controlled by the Auckland Provincial Council. In late 1871, a public meeting in Grahamstown resolved:

That in the opinion of the meeting it is desirable that a Municipal Corporation should be established for the Thames.

This resulted in the forming of a Thames Municipality Committee in early 1872. The Borough of Thames was gazetted in November 1873. The first Borough Council was elected in March 1874. As was practice at the time, the councillors voted one from their midst to be the mayor. William Davies was the only person proposed and voted into the role unanimously in April 1874.

During the 1870s, Governor George Grey represented Thames in the New Zealand Parliament.

In total, there were 24 Mayors of Thames Borough. In 1975, Thames Borough amalgamated with Coromandel County, out of which Thames-Coromandel District arose.

== Economy ==
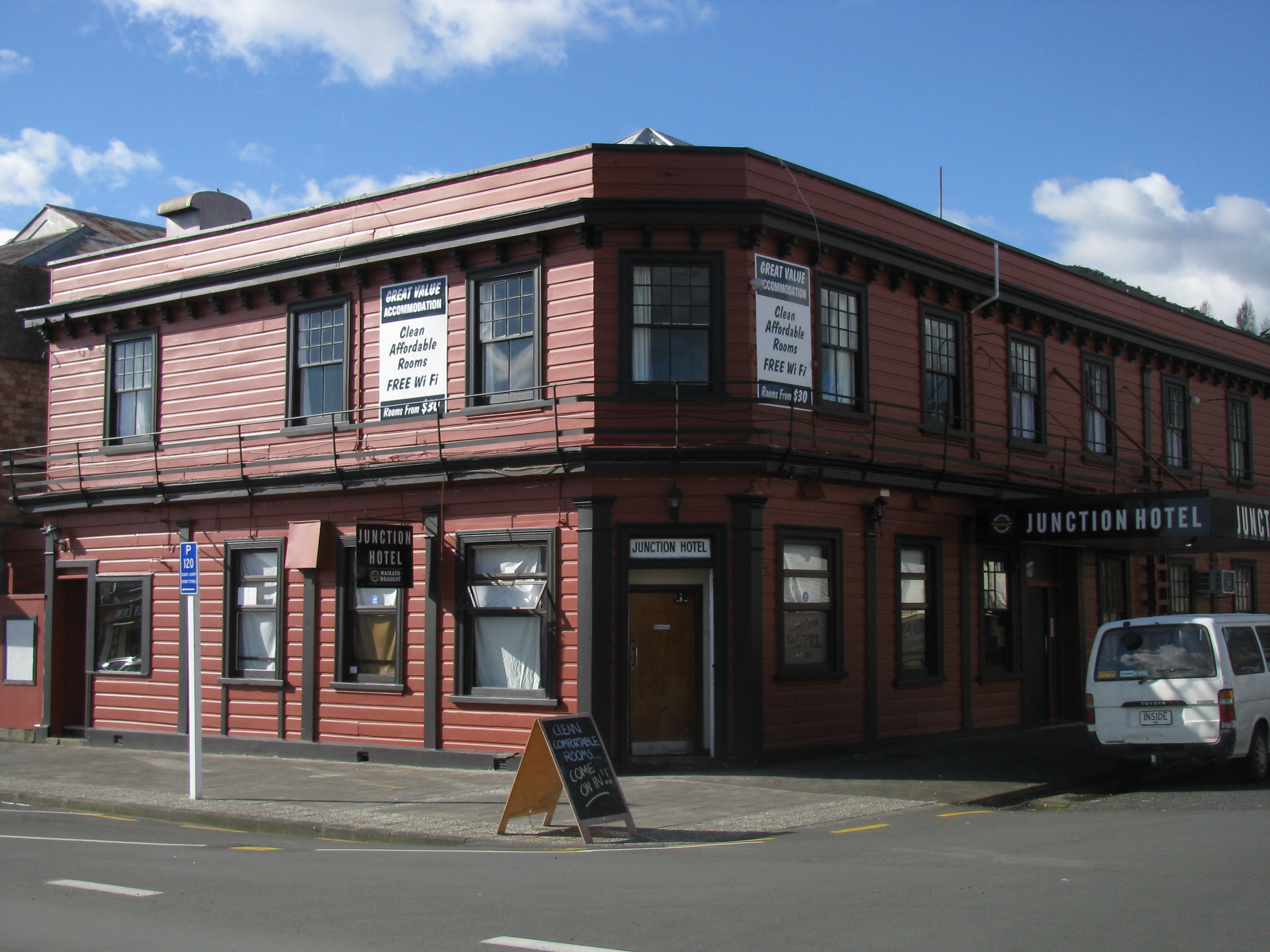
Junction Hotel, one of several historic buildings remaining intact in Thames

Thames Hospital is the oldest still operating in New Zealand, having been built in the 1860s. The Māori owned land was donated by the Ngāti Maru rangatira Rapana Maunganoa. A new clinical centre and other improvements were completed in 2008, and a new maternity facility opened on 5 September 2011. The Thames Jockey Club was one of the earliest to be established in New Zealand.

The Thames Aerodrome is 3 km south of the town. Regular flights to Auckland are operated by Great Barrier Airlines. A major employer is the Toyota New Zealand plant, which assembled CKD cars until 1998, and now refurbishes imported used cars. Another is the precision engineering works and foundry of A&G Price, established 1868, who built 123 steam locomotives for New Zealand Railways Department. The Brian Boru Hotel, built in 1868, is the oldest Irish pub in New Zealand. Most shops are located on Pollen Street. Goldfields Shopping Centre is a major shopping mall in Thames. Many residents work in tourism and locally owned businesses servicing the local farming community. Thames has also been used as a filming location for movies including Falling Inn Love East of Eden and the sequel to A Minecraft Movie

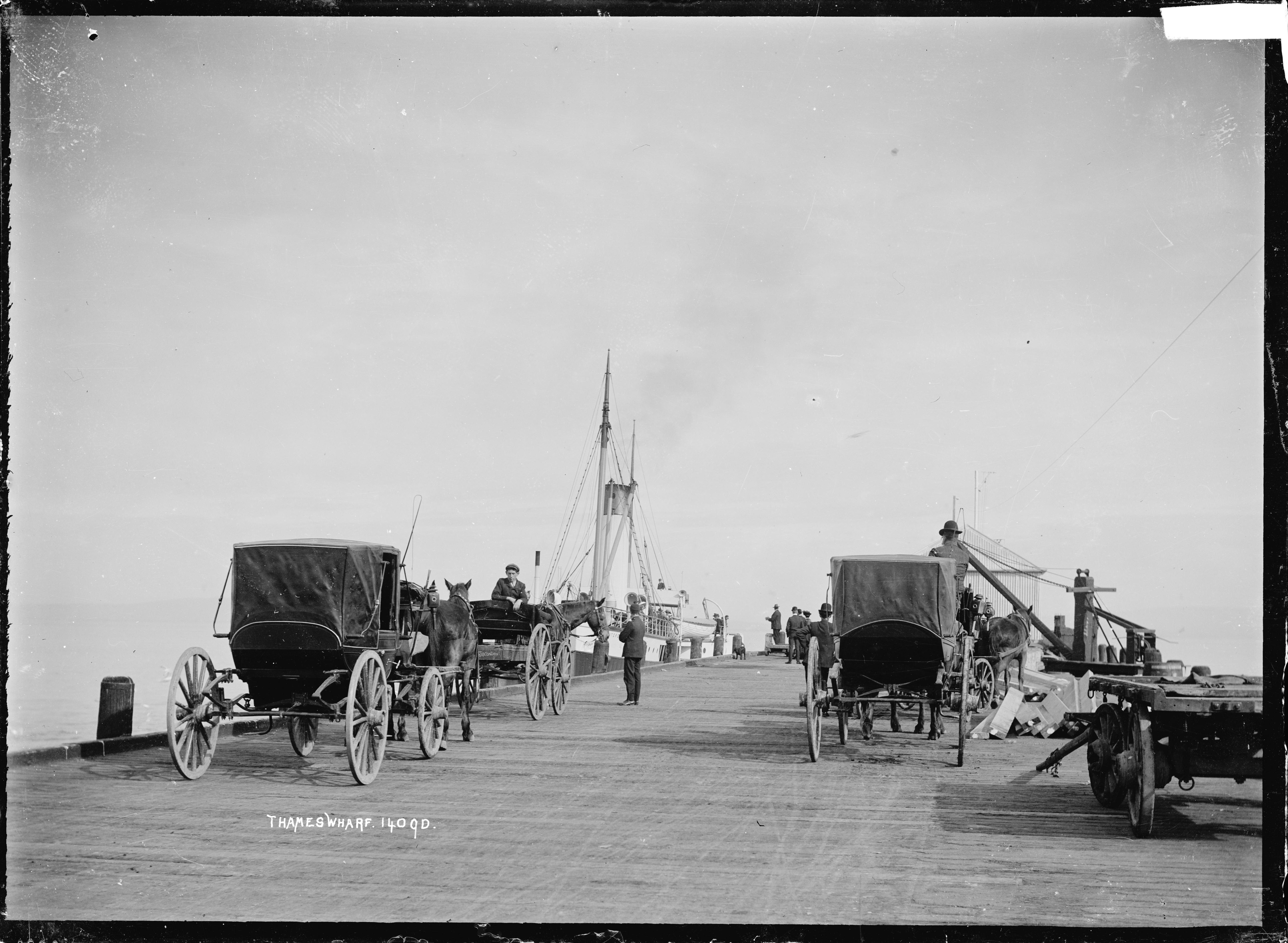
Northern Steamship's PS Terranora at Thames Wharf about 1898

== Transport ==
=== Port ===
Initially the main access to Thames was by sea, with goods and passengers landed on the beach. Shortland Wharf was built in 1868 and remains in use. Thames Harbour Board controlled the port from 1876 until it was merged with the Town Council in 1936. By then competition, following the opening of the railway in 1898 and then the Hauraki (now Kopu) Bridge in 1928, had reduced the profitability of the wharves and a commissioner had been appointed, as the town couldn't meet its debts.

Ships which have served Thames have included SS Go Ahead and Northern Steamship Co's Terranora (1898), Kapui (1911) and Waipu (1928).

=== Railway ===
The Thames branch railway connecting the town with Hamilton was opened in 1898 and was closed in 1991 and the tracks were taken up, though Thames railway station remains. The branch now provides part of the course for the Hauraki Rail Trail.

=== Road ===
SH25 passes though Thames.

==== Bus ====
Thames Connector buses run 5 times a day between Tararu and Parawai. Go Kiwi operate a shuttle bus from the east coast of Coromandel, via Thames, to Auckland. InterCity run twice a day between Auckland and Tauranga via Thames.

== Education ==
Thames High School is a secondary (years 9–13) school with a decile rating of 5 and a roll of 402. The school was established in 1880 and is the second oldest secondary school in the Auckland Province.

Moanataiari School, Parawai and Thames South are full primary (years 1–8) schools with decile ratings of 5, 6 and 3 and rolls of 126, 231 and 60, respectively.

St Francis School is a full primary (years 1–8) school with a decile rating of 7 and a roll of 79. It is a state integrated Catholic school.

All these schools are coeducational. Rolls are as of July 2026.

A former local institution of learning was the Thames School of Mines.

Another former school, Thames North, was at Tararu. It is now Thames Art Gallery.

== Notable people from Thames ==
- Kylie Bax – model and actress
- David Brokenshire – architect and potter
- Paul Dibble – sculptor
- Frances Haselden – headmistress of Kauaeranga Girls' School in Thames
- Charlotte Lawlor – poet, writer and advertising designer
- Sir Graham Liggins - medical/obstetrical researcher
- Thomas Alexander O'Brien – cinema owner and entrepreneur
- Air Chief Marshal Sir Keith Park – WWII Air Commander and AOC 11 Group during Battle of Britain (July – October 1940)
- Rex Percy – NZ rugby league player
- Sonny Parker – Welsh international rugby union player
- Bruce Purchase – British actor
- Sydney Ross – criminal
- Lloyd Stephenson – hockey player
- Eruini Heina Taipari – tribal leader
- Puti Tipene Watene – NZ rugby league player and politician
- Hera Lindsay Bird - Poet

== Climate ==
Climate data for Thames (1991–2020 normals, extremes 1946–present)
Month	Jan	Feb	Mar	Apr	May	Jun	Jul	Aug	Sep	Oct	Nov	Dec	Year
Record high °C (°F)	30.5 (86.9)	30.1 (86.2)	28.2 (82.8)	26.5 (79.7)	24.1 (75.4)	22.2 (72.0)	21.3 (70.3)	20.5 (68.9)	22.6 (72.7)	24.3 (75.7)	27.0 (80.6)	28.0 (82.4)	30.5 (86.9)
Mean maximum °C (°F)	27.7 (81.9)	28.0 (82.4)	26.5 (79.7)	24.5 (76.1)	21.8 (71.2)	19.2 (66.6)	18.2 (64.8)	18.5 (65.3)	20.1 (68.2)	21.8 (71.2)	23.9 (75.0)	26.0 (78.8)	28.5 (83.3)
Mean daily maximum °C (°F)	24.6 (76.3)	24.9 (76.8)	23.3 (73.9)	20.9 (69.6)	18.0 (64.4)	15.5 (59.9)	14.8 (58.6)	15.4 (59.7)	17.1 (62.8)	18.6 (65.5)	20.5 (68.9)	22.7 (72.9)	19.7 (67.4)
Daily mean °C (°F)	19.6 (67.3)	20.0 (68.0)	18.3 (64.9)	16.1 (61.0)	13.6 (56.5)	11.4 (52.5)	10.6 (51.1)	11.3 (52.3)	12.8 (55.0)	14.3 (57.7)	15.9 (60.6)	18.1 (64.6)	15.2 (59.3)
Mean daily minimum °C (°F)	14.6 (58.3)	15.0 (59.0)	13.2 (55.8)	11.4 (52.5)	9.2 (48.6)	7.3 (45.1)	6.5 (43.7)	7.2 (45.0)	8.6 (47.5)	10.0 (50.0)	11.3 (52.3)	13.6 (56.5)	10.7 (51.2)
Mean minimum °C (°F)	8.8 (47.8)	9.3 (48.7)	8.1 (46.6)	5.2 (41.4)	2.4 (36.3)	0.8 (33.4)	0.1 (32.2)	1.3 (34.3)	2.5 (36.5)	3.9 (39.0)	5.4 (41.7)	7.9 (46.2)	−0.4 (31.3)
Record low °C (°F)	1.7 (35.1)	5.1 (41.2)	0.2 (32.4)	1.1 (34.0)	−2.5 (27.5)	−2.5 (27.5)	−2.2 (28.0)	−1.2 (29.8)	−0.8 (30.6)	−0.1 (31.8)	1.4 (34.5)	3.8 (38.8)	−2.5 (27.5)
Average rainfall mm (inches)	66.1 (2.60)	74.0 (2.91)	86.3 (3.40)	104.6 (4.12)	95.4 (3.76)	129.4 (5.09)	150.6 (5.93)	124.7 (4.91)	92.0 (3.62)	80.9 (3.19)	68.3 (2.69)	86.3 (3.40)	1,158.6 (45.62)
Mean monthly sunshine hours	217.2	199.5	195.6	158.3	130.3	104.2	117.8	145.6	149.6	171.8	186.5	198.8	1,975.2
Source: NIWA
