= Eruini Heina Taipari =

Ngāti Maru iwi (tribal) leader

Eruini Heina Taipari (1889–1956) was a New Zealand tribal leader. Of Māori descent, he identified with the following tribes: Ngāti Maru, Ngāti Pāoa, Ngāti Tamaterā and Ngāti Whanaunga iwi. He was born in Thames, Thames/Coromandel, New Zealand in about 1889.
