= Sydney Ross =

New Zealand labourer, criminal, conspirator

Sydney Gordon Ross
- Born: 6 February 1909; Thames
- Died: 29 August 1946 (aged 37)
- Occupations: Labourer, Criminal, Conspirator

Sydney Gordon Ross (6 February 1909 – 29 August 1946) was a New Zealand labourer, criminal and conspirator. He was born in Thames, Coromandel Peninsula, New Zealand in 1909. He is best known for having deceived New Zealand's Security Department into believing that he was obtaining intelligence about Nazi agents who had arrived in the country by submarine.
