= Tom O'Brien (footballer, born 1904) =

Australian rules footballer, born 1904

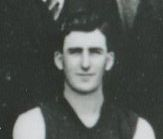

Personal information
- Full name: Thomas Patrick Benedict O'Brien
- Born: 13 April 1904; Glenrowan, Victoria
- Died: 3 March 1983 (aged 78); Warragul, Victoria
- Original team: Bayles

Playing career^{1}
Years	Club	Games (Goals)
1926	Melbourne	4 (0)
- ^{1} Playing statistics correct to the end of 1926.

Thomas Patrick Benedict O'Brien (13 April 1904 – 3 March 1983) was an Australian rules footballer who played with Melbourne in the Victorian Football League (VFL).
