= Thomas Alexander O'Brien =

Thomas Alexander O'Brien (1888–1948) was a New Zealand cinema owner and entrepreneur. He was born in Thames, Coromandel, New Zealand in 1888.
