= Eureka, New Zealand =

Locality in Waikato, New Zealand

Eureka
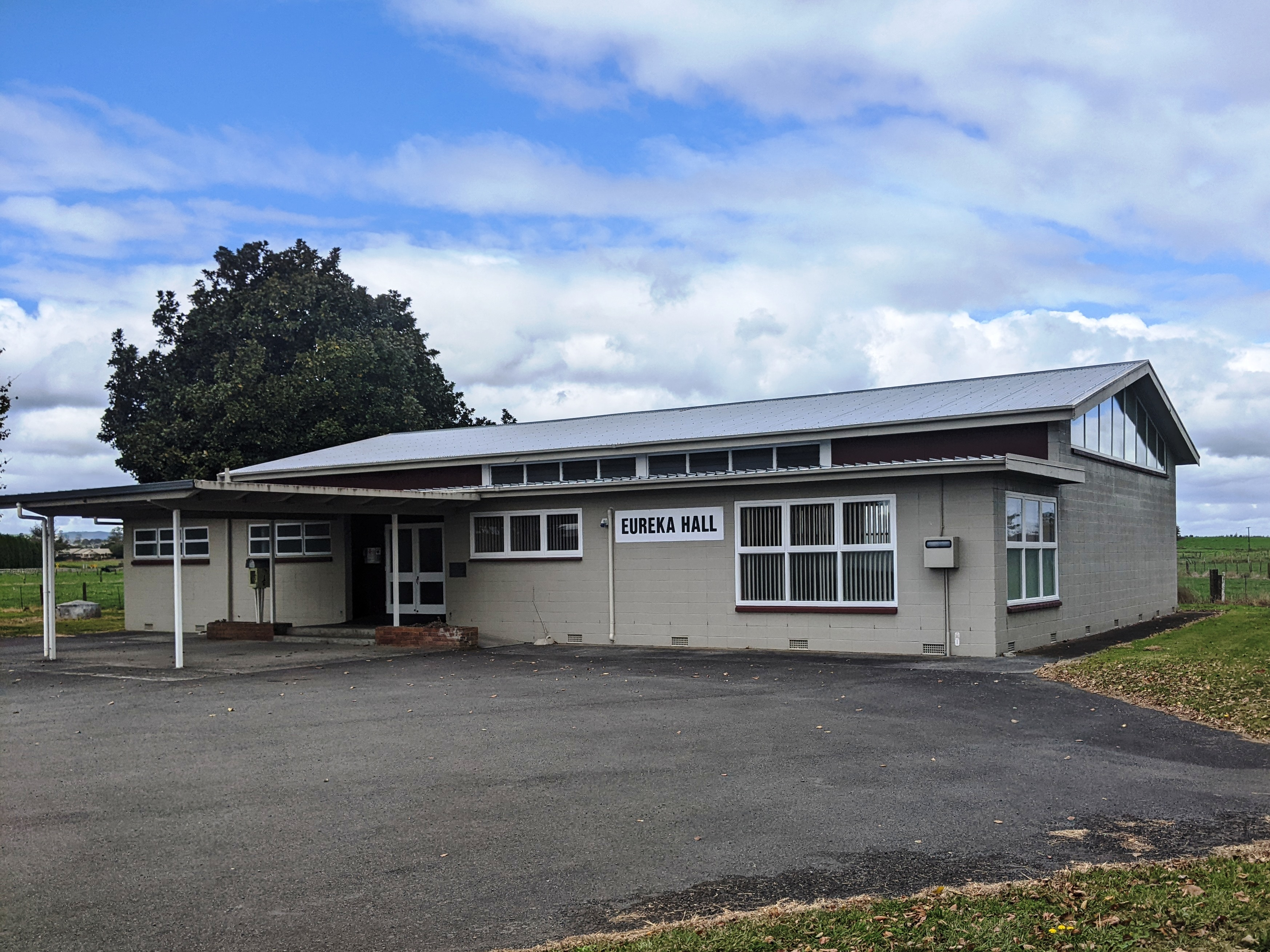
- Eureka Hall
- Interactive map of Eureka
- Coordinates: 37.742341°S 175.426335°E
- Country: New Zealand
- Region: Waikato
- District: Waikato District
- Wards: Tamahere-Woodlands General Ward; Tai Runga Takiwaa Maaori Ward
- Electorates: Waikato; Hauraki-Waikato (Māori)

Government
  - Territorial Authority: Waikato District Council
  - Regional council: Waikato Regional Council
  - Mayor of Waikato: Aksel Bech
  - Waikato MP: Tim van de Molen
  - Hauraki-Waikato MP: Hana-Rawhiti Maipi-Clarke

Area
  - Total: 30.42 km^{2} (11.75 sq mi)

Population (2023 Census)
  - Total: 543
  - Density: 17.9/km^{2} (46.2/sq mi)

Eureka is a rural settlement in the Waikato District and Waikato region of New Zealand's North Island. It is located on State Highway 26, and is surrounded by dairy farmland on a flat plain.

There are various explanations for the name. One story suggests William Steele rode out with a syndicate looking for a headquarters, and exclaimed "Eureka I have found it" when he reached the hilltop. Another story suggests "Eureka" is an abbreviation of the first names of the women in the syndicate.

The settlement has a war memorial, listing local men who died in World War I and World War II.

== History ==
Eureka is on the former Piako Swamp, described in 1876 as deep. Following the invasion of the Waikato, it was part of the area confiscated from Ngāti Hauā in 1864. Captain William Steele, who brought militia-settlers from Sydney to Hamilton in 1864, persuaded Thomas Russell and Frederick Whitaker to form a company to buy land and drain it. In 1874 the government sold the 86,502 acres (350.06 km^{2}) Eureka Estate, extending from Te Hoe to Tauwhare, Tamahere, Gordonton and the 35 km (22 mi) confiscation line, to New Zealand Loan and Mercantile Agency Company Limited. The sale required 25 mi (40 km) of road to be built over the swamp. Drains were dug up to 3.5 m (11 ft) wide and 3 m (9.8 ft) deep. The expense of drainage contributed to bankruptcy and the sale of small parcels in 1902. The population then increased, so that a school was built in May 1904, a dairy factory in 1905, a hall in 1914 (replaced in January 1969), a post office opened in 1915, a store in 1925 and a garage in 1928. However, by 1981 all the early buildings had gone.

== Demographics ==
Eureka covers 30.42 km^{2} (11.75 sq mi). Eureka is part of the larger Eureka-Tauwhare statistical area.

Historical population for Eureka and surrounds
Year	Pop.	±% p.a.
2006	453	—
2013	504	+1.54%
2018	573	+2.60%
2023	543	−1.07%

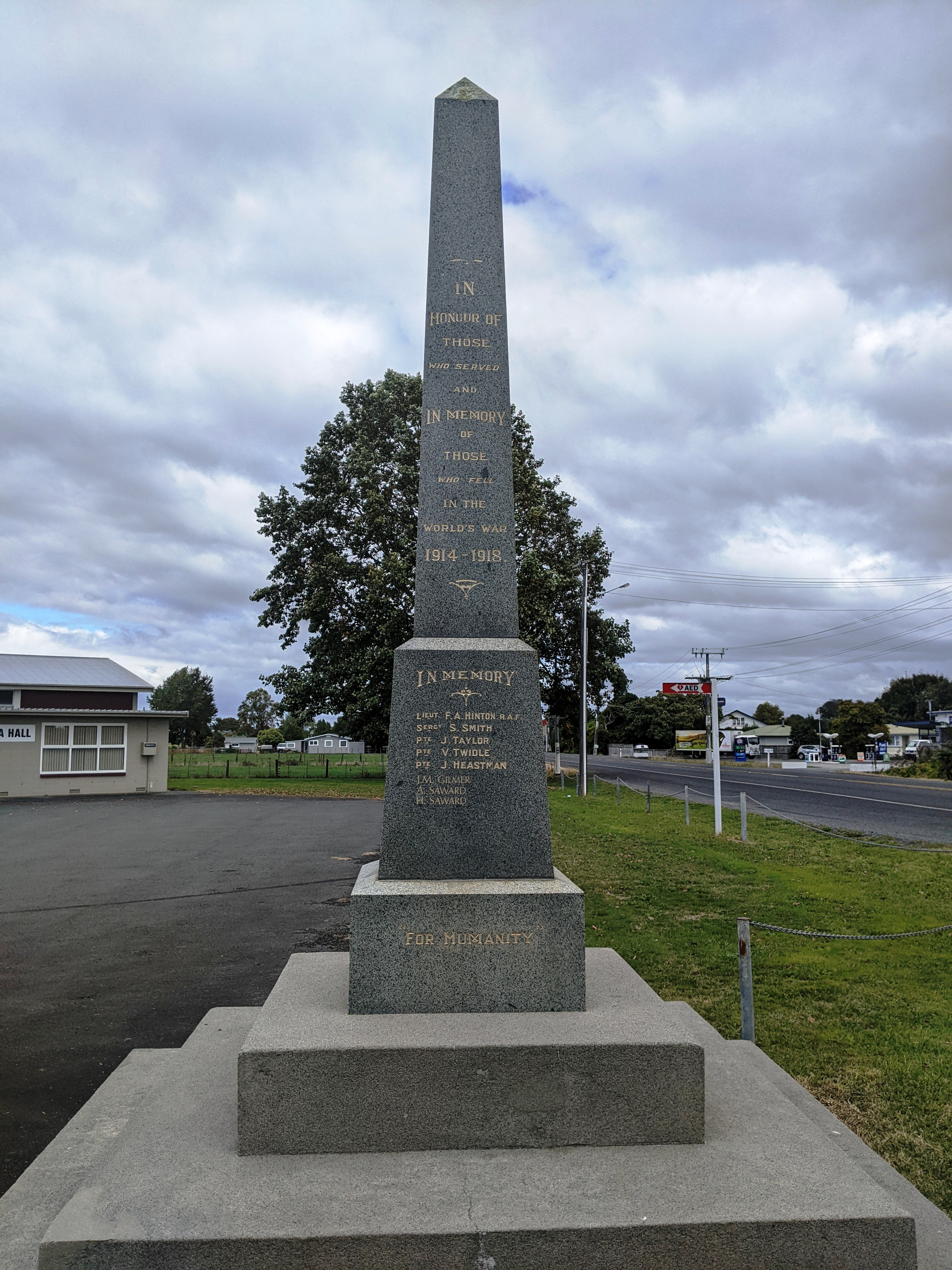
Eureka war memorial

Eureka had a population of 543 in the 2023 New Zealand census, a decrease of 30 people (−5.2%) since the 2018 census, and an increase of 39 people (7.7%) since the 2013 census. There were 264 males and 279 females in 192 dwellings. 2.8% of people identified as LGBTIQ+. There were 111 people (20.4%) aged under 15 years, 96 (17.7%) aged 15 to 29, 270 (49.7%) aged 30 to 64, and 78 (14.4%) aged 65 or older.

People could identify as more than one ethnicity. The results were 91.2% European (Pākehā), 8.3% Māori, 0.6% Pasifika, 6.6% Asian, and 5.5% other, which includes people giving their ethnicity as "New Zealander". English was spoken by 98.3%, Māori language by 2.2%, and other languages by 6.6%. No language could be spoken by 2.2% (e.g. too young to talk). The percentage of people born overseas was 12.7, compared with 28.8% nationally.

Religious affiliations were 23.8% Christian, 1.1% Hindu, 1.1% Māori religious beliefs, 1.7% Buddhist, and 1.1% other religions. People who answered that they had no religion were 61.9%, and 9.9% of people did not answer the census question.

Of those at least 15 years old, 93 (21.5%) people had a bachelor's or higher degree, 264 (61.1%) had a post-high school certificate or diploma, and 78 (18.1%) people exclusively held high school qualifications. 63 people (14.6%) earned over $100,000 compared to 12.1% nationally. The employment status of those at least 15 was that 249 (57.6%) people were employed full-time, 75 (17.4%) were part-time, and 6 (1.4%) were unemployed.

=== Eureka-Tauwhare statistical area ===
The 2001-13 censuses counted a Eureka area of 122.19 km^{2} (47.18 sq mi). In 2018 Eureka lost the area on the Hamilton border to a new area, Hamilton Park, and was grouped in the Eureka-Tauwhare statistical area, which covers 135.57 km^{2} (52.34 sq mi) and also includes Tauwhare. Eureka-Tauwhare had an estimated population of 2,260 as of June 2025, with a population density of 17 people per km^{2}.

Historical population for Eureka-Tauwhare
Year	Pop.	±% p.a.
2006	1,539	—
2013	1,917	+3.19%
2018	2,142	+2.24%
2023	2,154	+0.11%

Eureka-Tauwhare had a population of 2,154 in the 2023 New Zealand census, an increase of 12 people (0.6%) since the 2018 census, and an increase of 237 people (12.4%) since the 2013 census. There were 1,065 males, 1,083 females and 3 people of other genders in 699 dwellings. 2.4% of people identified as LGBTIQ+. The median age was 38.7 years (compared with 38.1 years nationally). There were 486 people (22.6%) aged under 15 years, 375 (17.4%) aged 15 to 29, 1,035 (48.1%) aged 30 to 64, and 261 (12.1%) aged 65 or older.

People could identify as more than one ethnicity. The results were 87.2% European (Pākehā); 13.4% Māori; 1.5% Pasifika; 7.7% Asian; 0.3% Middle Eastern, Latin American and African New Zealanders (MELAA); and 3.1% other, which includes people giving their ethnicity as "New Zealander". English was spoken by 96.9%, Māori language by 3.1%, Samoan by 0.6%, and other languages by 10.0%. No language could be spoken by 1.9% (e.g. too young to talk). New Zealand Sign Language was known by 0.3%. The percentage of people born overseas was 17.5, compared with 28.8% nationally.

Religious affiliations were 28.6% Christian, 1.0% Hindu, 0.6% Islam, 0.7% Māori religious beliefs, 1.0% Buddhist, 0.3% New Age, and 3.1% other religions. People who answered that they had no religion were 57.8%, and 7.4% of people did not answer the census question.

Of those at least 15 years old, 444 (26.6%) people had a bachelor's or higher degree, 924 (55.4%) had a post-high school certificate or diploma, and 297 (17.8%) people exclusively held high school qualifications. The median income was $52,500, compared with $41,500 nationally. 282 people (16.9%) earned over $100,000 compared to 12.1% nationally. The employment status of those at least 15 was that 990 (59.4%) people were employed full-time, 270 (16.2%) were part-time, and 30 (1.8%) were unemployed.

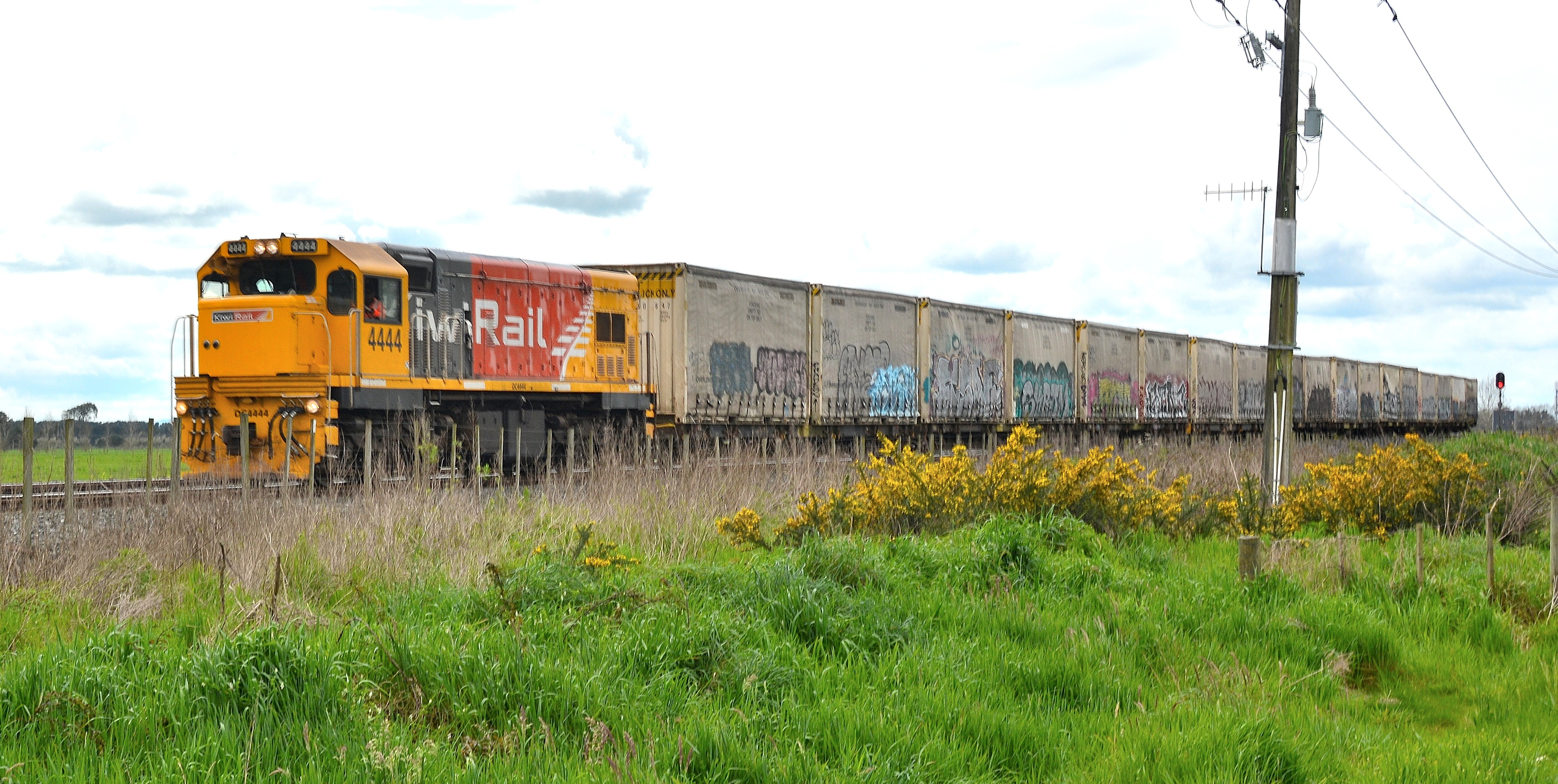
Kiwi Rail DC 4444 near Eureka

== Railway station ==
Eureka railway station was a flag station on the East Coast Main Trunk, about 3 km (1.9 mi) north of the village. It opened on 1 October 1884, when the 16 mi 73 ch (27.2 km) Eureka contract from Hamilton to Morrinsville was completed. The contract had been signed on 5 December 1883.

Eureka had a 4th class station, erected by the Auckland contractors, Price and Malcolm, with a station master's house, 2 cottages, 40 ft (12 m) by 30 ft (9.1 m) goods shed, cattle and sheep pens, loading bank, urinals and a passing loop for 38 wagons (extended to 61 by 1911), for £4,827.

There seems to have been some confusion about the goods shed and station building. In 1885 the Public Works Department reported that they moved the goods shed and 4th class station from Eureka to Hukutaia, yet, in 1886, the Railways Department reported that PWD had, without notification, moved the station building to Te Aroha. In 1896 there was just a shelter shed. In 1907 the Prime Minister was lobbied for a goods shed, which was authorised in 1908 and, by 1911, Eureka had a 30 ft (9.1 m) by 20 ft (6.1 m) shed.

Eureka closed to passengers on 11 September 1967 and to goods on 27 April 1980. A hut, an equipment shed and a passing loop remain at the station site.

Preceding station	Historical railways	Following station
Ruakura; Line open, station closed	East Coast Main Trunk; New Zealand Railways Department	Motumaoho; Line open, station closed
