= Whitikahu =

Locality in Waikato, New Zealand

- Hamlet
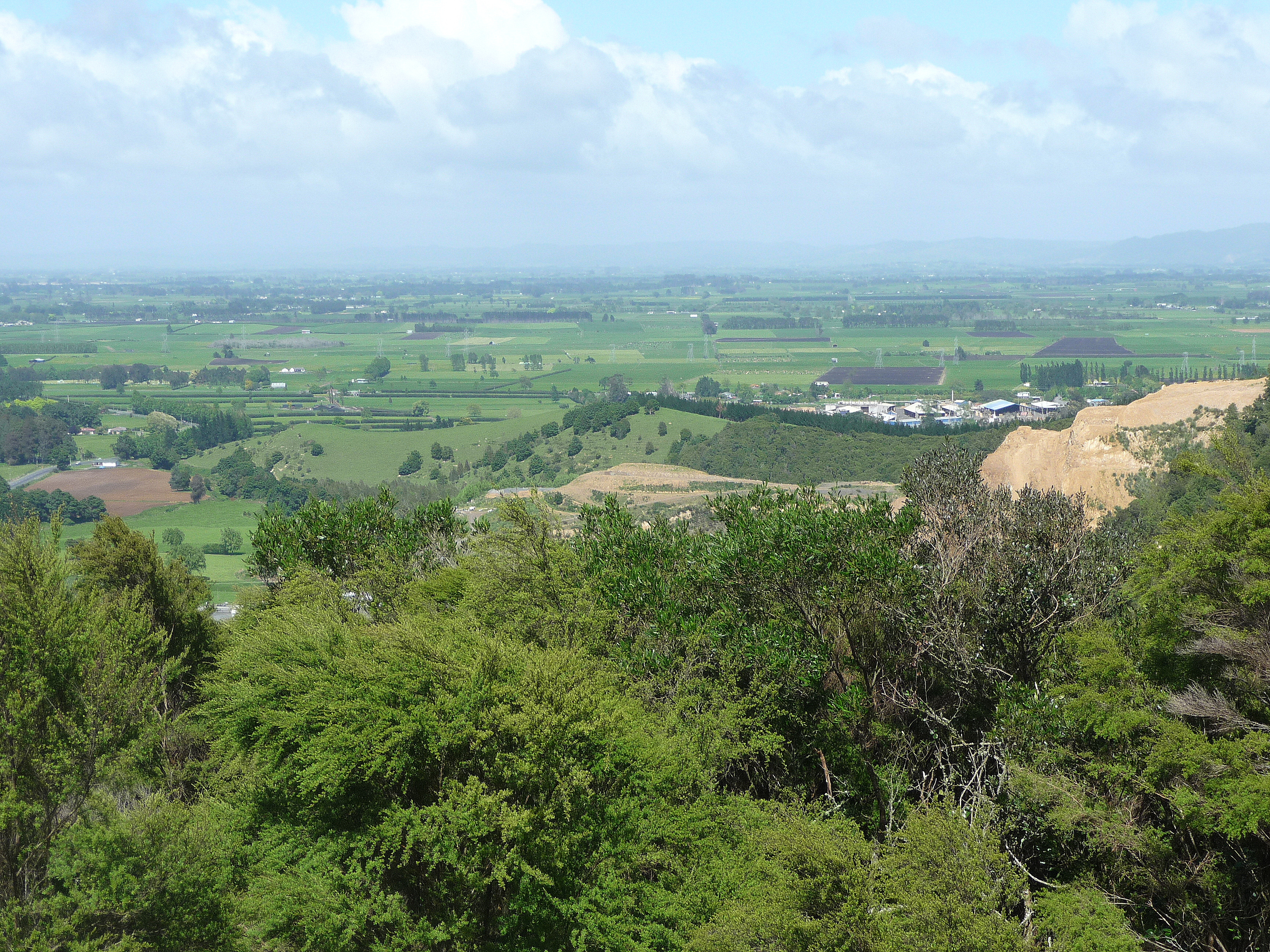
- Whitikahu from Pukemokemoke
- Interactive map of Whitikahu
- Coordinates: 37.61298°S 175.34627°E
- Country: New Zealand
- Region: Waikato
- District: Waikato District
- Wards: Waerenga-Whitikahu General Ward; Tai Runga Takiwaa Maaori Ward
- Electorates: Waikato; Hauraki-Waikato (Māori)

Government
  - Territorial Authority: Waikato District Council
  - Regional council: Waikato Regional Council
  - Mayor of Waikato: Aksel Bech
  - Waikato MP: Tim van de Molen
  - Hauraki-Waikato MP: Hana-Rawhiti Maipi-Clarke

Area
  - Total: 40.32 km^{2} (15.57 sq mi)

Population (2023 Census)
  - Total: 351
  - Density: 8.71/km^{2} (22.5/sq mi)
- Time zone: UTC+12 (NZST)
  - Summer (DST): UTC+13 (NZDT)
- Postcode: 3792
- Area code: 07

Whitikahu is a settlement scattered along Whitikahu Rd in the Waikato District and Waikato region of New Zealand's North Island.

It has a blueberry farm, a winery, the Senton Sawmill, a fire station, a petrol station and a hall.

It is in the Hukanui Waerenga Ward of Waikato District Council.

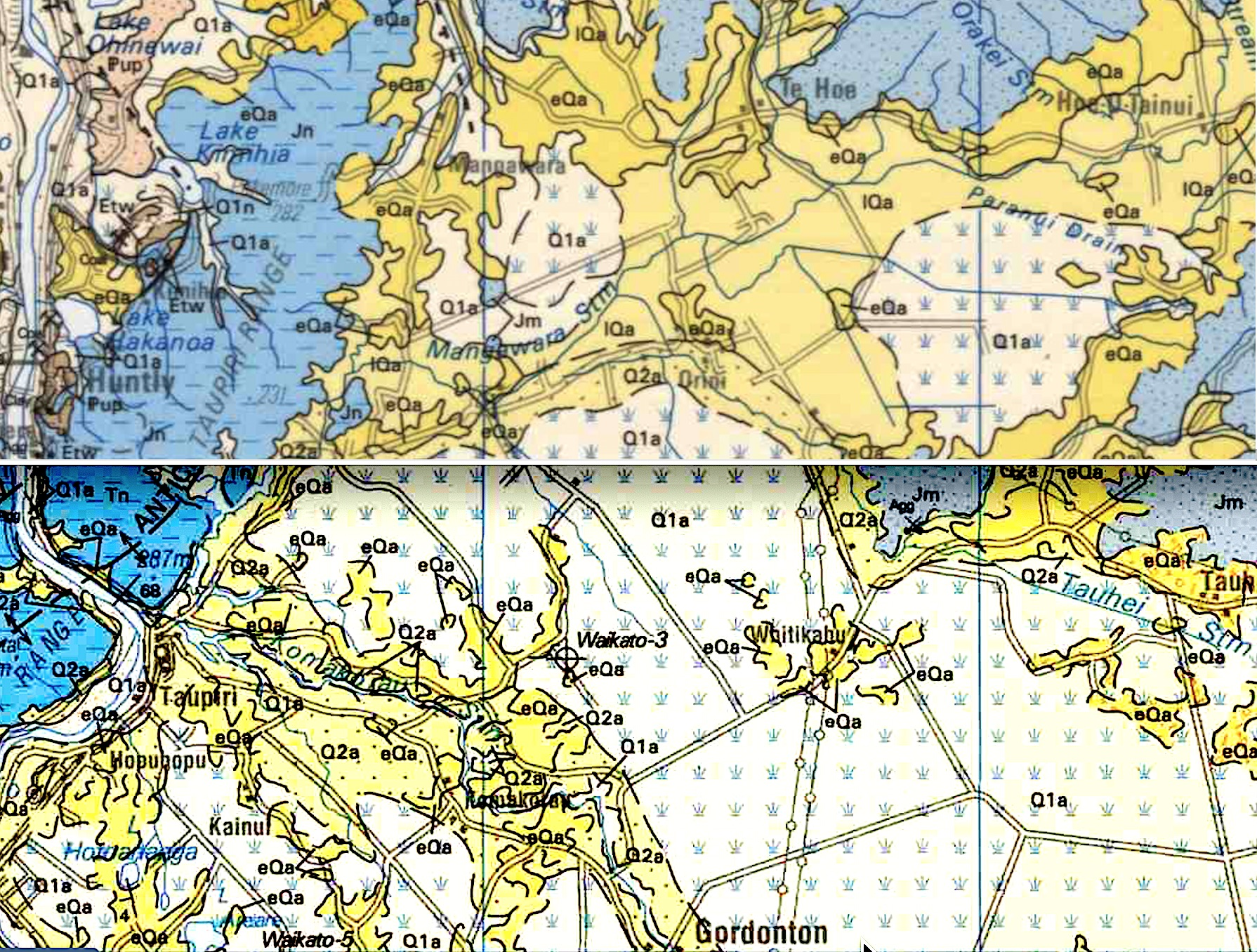
1 to 250,000 geology map

== Geology ==
Pukemokemoke hill is formed of greywacke of the Jurassic Manaia Hill Group (shown as Jm on map). The rest of the Whitikahu area is largely on a drained peat bog, which lies on ash from Lake Taupō.

Taupiri Fault is an inferred fault separating the peat from the Taupiri Range. Seismic testing in 2017 added evidence of the fault's position.

Whitikahu is at the north end of an alluvial fan of the ash, which drops about 60 m (200 ft) from Karapiro.

After the Oruanui eruption, some 26,500 years ago, Lake Taupō was about 145 m (476 ft) above the present lake. Around 22,500 years ago the ash dam eroded rapidly and the lake fell about 75 m (246 ft) in a few weeks, creating a series of massive floods. The ash they carried formed the main Hinuera Surface (Q2a) into the fan.

From then until about 17,600 years ago the Waikato would have been about 25 m (82 ft) higher than at present due to aggradation, resulting from remobilisation of pyroclastic material from Taupō, deposited as well-bedded, creamy-white pumice sands, silts and gravels with charcoal fragments.

One of its channels from that period followed the Mangawara Stream via the present air-gap at Mangawara. This earlier gorge was buried beneath alluvium but has since been partly re-exposed by the Mangawara Stream as the Waikato has deepened Taupiri gorge.

The Waikato eroded its present valley for about 3,500 years, at a time when the sea was around 100 m (330 ft) below its present level. The Walton Sub-Group (eQa) of pumiceous fine- grained sand and silt with interbedded peat, pumiceous gravelly sand, diatomaceous mud, and non-welded ignimbrite and tephra formed low hills, up to 50 m above the Hamilton Basin plain, on and around which younger sediments have been deposited. In this area they are named the Puketoka Formation. It is highly pumiceous, and, due to silica case-hardening, is able to form vertical bluffs, now weathered, eroded, dissected and largely buried by younger sediments.

Taupo Formation (Q1a) was laid down in the trench cut through the Hinuera surface. Taupo Formation alluvium is the top layer on which most of the peat bogs formed.

== History and culture ==
=== Pre-European history ===
From the 1600s: Ngati Koura and Ngati Wairere Waikai occupied the area, mainly for eel fishing. An old waka was discovered in 1937.

=== European settlement ===
After the invasion of the Waikato, the area was confiscated in 1863 and cut up into lots for the military settlers, though deemed too swampy for occupation. In 1873 the 1,604 acres (649 ha) Tauhei Block was returned to the hapū to farm.

Much of the area was in the Eureka Estate, which the New Zealand Loan and Mercantile Agency bought from the government in 1874. It was then owned by the Waikato Land Association, later known as NZ Land Association. Its 86,502 acres (35,006 ha) extended from Te Hoe to Tauwhare and Tamahere. In 1876 Whitikahu was described as a deep swamp, but a condition of the sale was that NZLMA should build drains and roads. Kauri gum was being dug in 1893, when about half the area had been drained. Kauri stumps of up to 6 ft (1.8 m) diameter and 53 ft (16 m) long are thought to have died due to flooding after the Waikato changed its course.

=== 20th century ===
Flax was milled in the area from 1890 until a 1908 fire and again from 1918. A new Orini mill opened in 1936 and flax was still being grown in 1938, when there was another fire. The drained peat has also caught fire from time to time.

By 1912 over 30 voters were recorded, there was a twice-weekly post delivery and there were three sheep farms.

Electricity came in 1923. A hall was built and a bus service to Hamilton, started in 1937 and was still running in 1964 and into the 1970s.

=== Marae ===
The local Tauhei Marae and its Māramatutahi meeting ground are a traditional meeting place of the Waikato Tainui hapū of Ngāti Makirangi and Ngāti Wairere.

In October 2020, the Government committed $95,664 from the Provincial Growth Fund to upgrade the Tauhei Marae, creating an estimated 7 jobs.

== Demographics ==
Whitikahu locality covers 40.32 km^{2} (15.57 sq mi). It is part of the larger Whitikahu statistical area.

Historical population for Whitihaku locality
Year	Pop.	±% p.a.
2006	294	—
2013	351	+2.56%
2018	351	+0.00%
2023	351	+0.00%

Whitikahu had a population of 351 in the 2023 New Zealand census, unchanged since the 2018 census, and unchanged since the 2013 census. There were 192 males, 162 females and 3 people of other genders in 123 dwellings. 1.7% of people identified as LGBTIQ+. There were 75 people (21.4%) aged under 15 years, 66 (18.8%) aged 15 to 29, 162 (46.2%) aged 30 to 64, and 42 (12.0%) aged 65 or older.

People could identify as more than one ethnicity. The results were 84.6% European (Pākehā); 13.7% Māori; 12.8% Asian; 1.7% Middle Eastern, Latin American and African New Zealanders (MELAA); and 1.7% other, which includes people giving their ethnicity as "New Zealander". English was spoken by 97.4%, Māori language by 1.7%, and other languages by 10.3%. No language could be spoken by 2.6% (e.g. too young to talk). New Zealand Sign Language was known by 0.9%. The percentage of people born overseas was 17.9, compared with 28.8% nationally.

Religious affiliations were 27.4% Christian, 1.7% Hindu, 0.9% Buddhist, and 7.7% other religions. People who answered that they had no religion were 51.3%, and 11.1% of people did not answer the census question.

Of those at least 15 years old, 51 (18.5%) people had a bachelor's or higher degree, 168 (60.9%) had a post-high school certificate or diploma, and 54 (19.6%) people exclusively held high school qualifications. 30 people (10.9%) earned over $100,000 compared to 12.1% nationally. The employment status of those at least 15 was that 165 (59.8%) people were employed full-time, 42 (15.2%) were part-time, and 3 (1.1%) were unemployed.

=== Whitikahu statistical area ===
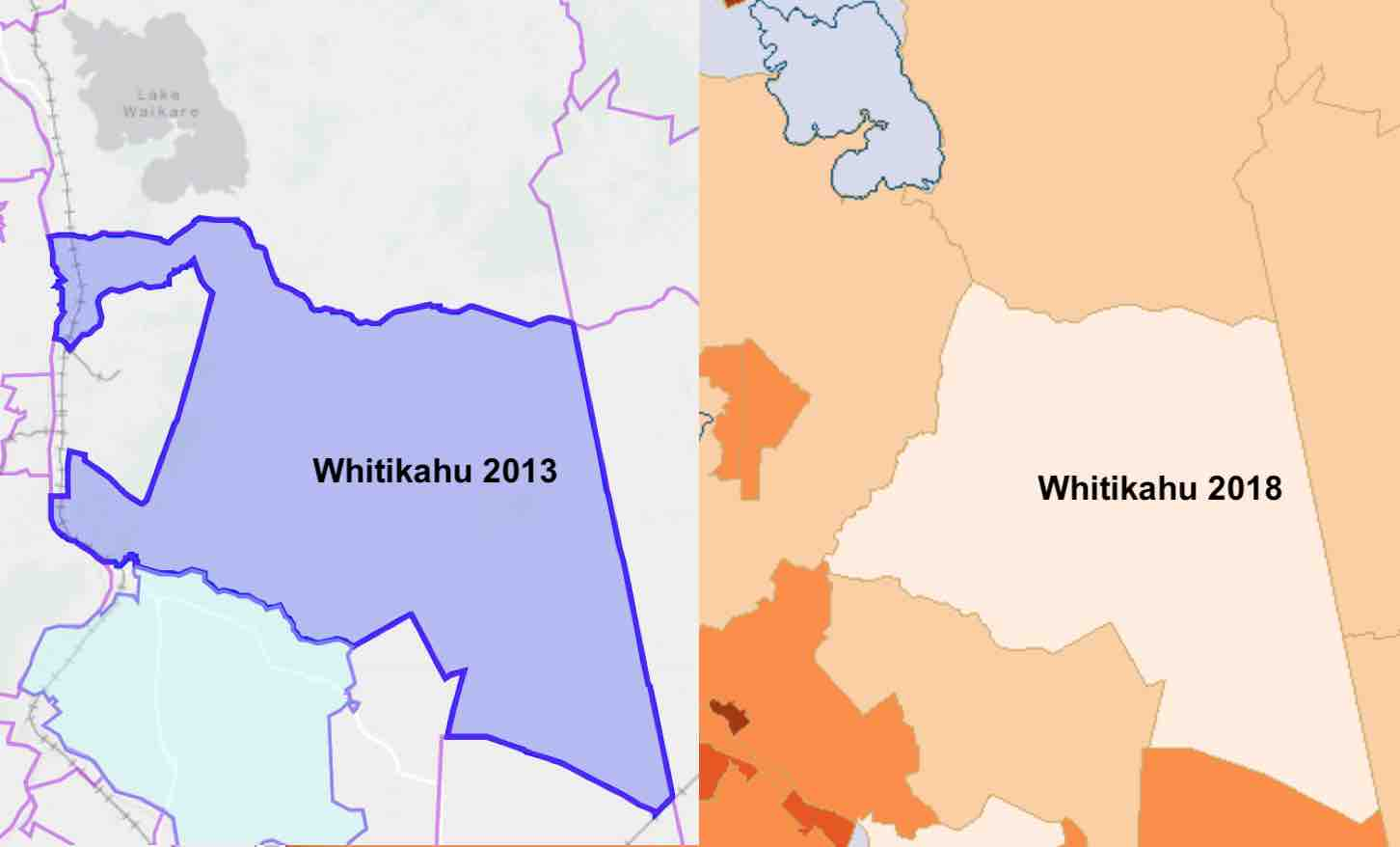
Whitikahu census area was reduced in 2018 by loss of areas to Huntly rural

The statistical area of Whitikahu, which includes Orini and Netherby, covers 253.64 km^{2} (97.93 sq mi) and had an estimated population of 2,110 as of June 2025, with a population density of 8.3 people per km^{2}.

Historical population for Whitikahu statistical area
Year	Pop.	±% p.a.
2006	1,794	—
2013	1,884	+0.70%
2018	1,968	+0.88%
2023	1,977	+0.09%

Whitikahu statistical area had a population of 1,977 in the 2023 New Zealand census, an increase of 9 people (0.5%) since the 2018 census, and an increase of 93 people (4.9%) since the 2013 census. There were 1,047 males, 927 females and 6 people of other genders in 639 dwellings. 2.1% of people identified as LGBTIQ+. The median age was 35.3 years (compared with 38.1 years nationally). There were 459 people (23.2%) aged under 15 years, 381 (19.3%) aged 15 to 29, 933 (47.2%) aged 30 to 64, and 204 (10.3%) aged 65 or older.

People could identify as more than one ethnicity. The results were 83.8% European (Pākehā); 15.2% Māori; 1.4% Pasifika; 11.2% Asian; 1.2% Middle Eastern, Latin American and African New Zealanders (MELAA); and 2.0% other, which includes people giving their ethnicity as "New Zealander". English was spoken by 96.5%, Māori language by 2.3%, and other languages by 9.6%. No language could be spoken by 2.3% (e.g. too young to talk). New Zealand Sign Language was known by 0.6%. The percentage of people born overseas was 14.9, compared with 28.8% nationally.

Religious affiliations were 26.7% Christian, 1.4% Hindu, 0.3% Islam, 0.3% Māori religious beliefs, 0.3% Buddhist, 0.5% New Age, 0.2% Jewish, and 5.5% other religions. People who answered that they had no religion were 57.8%, and 7.1% of people did not answer the census question.

Of those at least 15 years old, 267 (17.6%) people had a bachelor's or higher degree, 915 (60.3%) had a post-high school certificate or diploma, and 339 (22.3%) people exclusively held high school qualifications. The median income was $51,000, compared with $41,500 nationally. 204 people (13.4%) earned over $100,000 compared to 12.1% nationally. The employment status of those at least 15 was that 909 (59.9%) people were employed full-time, 249 (16.4%) were part-time, and 21 (1.4%) were unemployed.

== Education ==
Whitikahu School opened in 1912. It is a primary school for years 1 to 8 with 56 students as of July 2026, and now has a swimming pool, tennis courts, playgrounds, sports fields, 5 classrooms, a library and multi-media suite.

== Drainage ==
The drainage begun by NZLMA was continued by drainage boards set up under the Land Drainage Act 1908 and the Taupiri Drainage and River Board Empowering Act, 1936. By 1926 some of it was described as fine dairying land. In the 1930s the board aimed to drain the whole of the wetland. With government grants, they used unemployed workers to drain an area south of Te Hoe and create roads and farms from 1936 to 1938. However, although drains, floodgates and dams were built, flooding remains a problem.

The Mangatea Catchment Restoration Project, led by Tauhei Marae, aims to reduce pollution of the local streams which run into the Waikato River. 19 km (12 mi) of fencing beside the Mangawara and Tauhei streams will reduce pollutants entering them.

== Pukemokemoke Bush Reserve ==
Since 1990 Pukemokemoke Bush Trust has been restoring the reserve, which rises to 166 m (545 ft) above Whitikahu, which is at about 30 m (98 ft). The greywacke here is of the Jurassic Manaia Hill Group.

The hill was logged by Roose Shipping Co from 1949, into the 1950s, but kauri, mataī, kahikatea, rimu, tōtara, tawa, rewarewa, titoki, pukatea and taraire remain and about 15,000 native trees have replaced privet and other weeds. 110 species were listed in 1962.

The neighbouring Tauhei quarry has been owned by Fulton Hogan since 2016. It was formerly operated by Perry Group for Waikato District Council. Production was increased to supply aggregates for the Waikato Expressway in 2017 and 2018.
