= Leslie Kelly =

Leslie Kelly may refer to:

- Leslie Kelley (born 1944), American football player
- Leslie George Kelly (1906–1959), New Zealand journalist, engine driver and historian
