= Waitakaruru Arboretum =

Arboretum in New Zealand

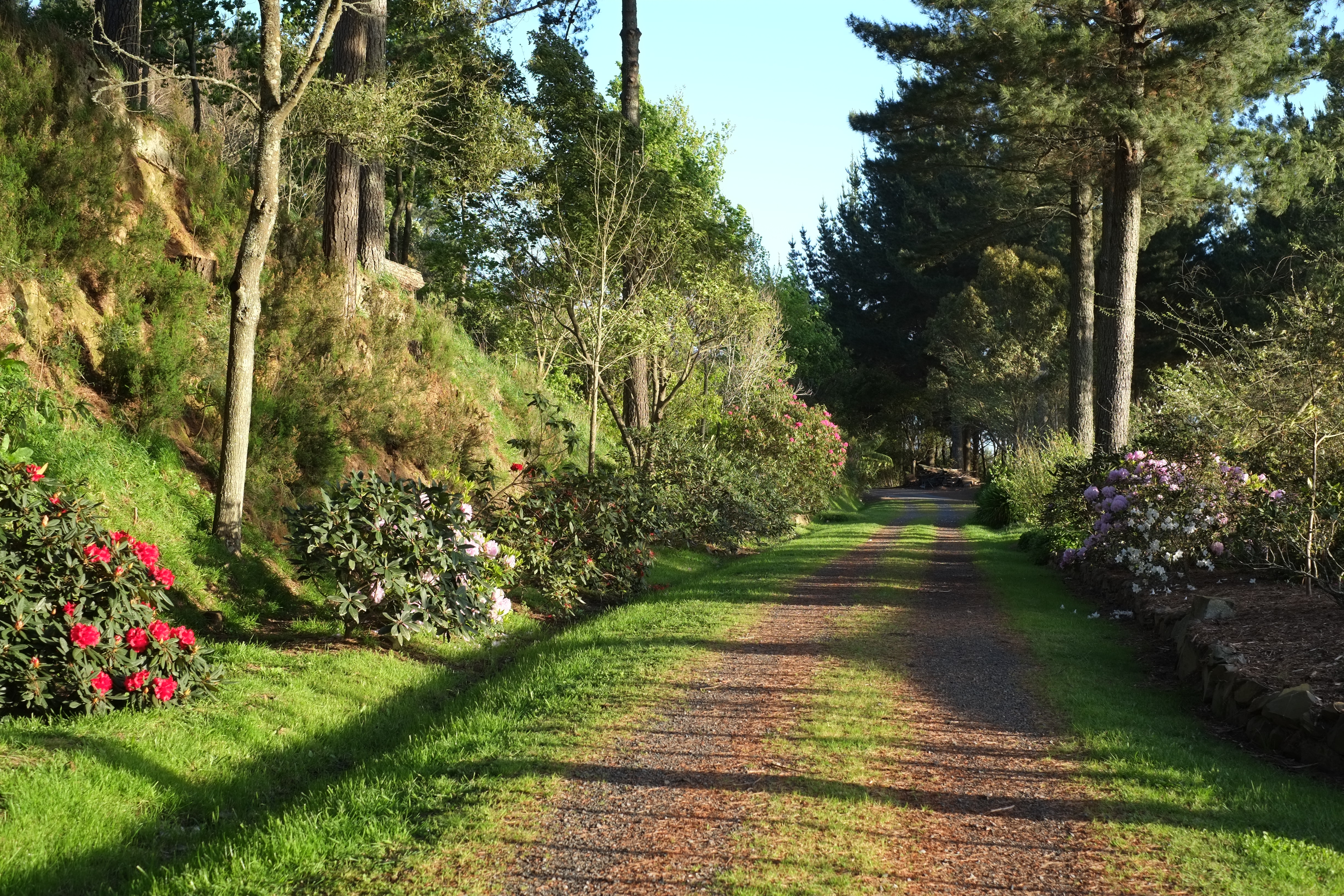
- Path through Waitakururu Arboretum
- Interactive map of Waitakaruru Arboretum
- Location: Waikato region, New Zealand
- Nearest city: Hamilton
- Coordinates: 37.7755°S 175.4691°E
- Area: 17.5 hectares (43 acres)
- Operator: Art-in-Nature Arboretum Trust

The Sculpture Park at Waitakaruru Arboretum is an arboretum in New Zealand. Situated in a disused quarry near the small village of Tauwhare in the Waikato region, the project to rehabilitate the site was initiated in 1991 by the owners, John and Dorothy Wakeling. They have passed the park over to a charitable trust. The park is now run by the Art-in-Nature Arboretum Trust.

The 17.5 ha area contains more than 25,000 trees and shrubs and also houses an outdoor sculpture park, of more than 100 sculptures and installations. The area closer to the quarry cliffs and the enclosed lake has also been used as a site for musical performances.

== Geography ==
The sculpture park and arboretum is set into a hillside that was once used as a quarry. In parts, the lack of a good topsoil layer made the rehabilitation difficult. The sculpture park overlooks the gentle rolling pasture land east of Hamilton. The Waitakaruru Stream runs through the lower part of the arboretum, and several ponds and a small lake are also part of the grounds.
