= Motumaoho =

Village in Waikato, New Zealand

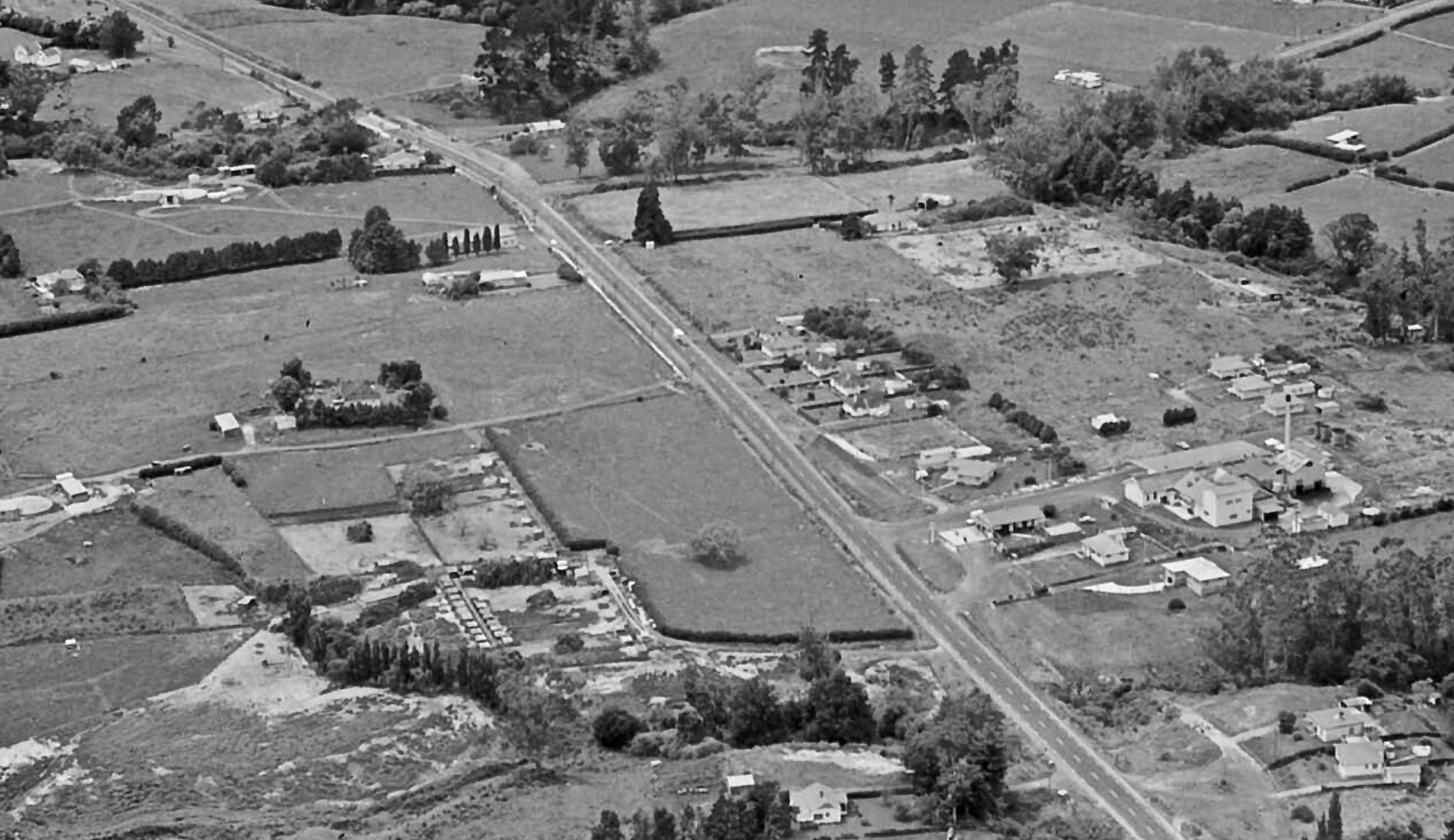
- Motumaoho on 22 Jan 1968
- Interactive map of Motumaoho
- Coordinates: 37.691264°S 175.470972°E
- Country: New Zealand
- Region: Waikato
- District: Matamata-Piako District
- Ward: Morrinsville General Ward
- Electorates: Waikato; Hauraki-Waikato (Māori)

Government
  - Territorial Authority: Matamata-Piako District Council
  - Regional council: Waikato Regional Council
  - Mayor of Matamata-Piako: Ash Tanner
  - Waikato MP: Tim van de Molen
  - Hauraki-Waikato MP: Hana-Rawhiti Maipi-Clarke

Area
  - Total: 27.95 km^{2} (10.79 sq mi)

Population (2023 Census)
  - Total: 366
  - Density: 13.1/km^{2} (33.9/sq mi)
- Time zone: UTC+12 (NZST)
  - Summer (DST): UTC+13 (NZDT)
- Postcode: 3372
- Area code: 07

Motumaoho is a small village in the Waikato region of New Zealand's North Island, just to the west of the Pakaroa Range. It is on SH26, 25 km (16 mi) east of Hamilton and 7 km (4.3 mi) west of Morrinsville. The village is bordered by the Waitakaruru Stream to the east. Motumaoho can be translated as an intruding clump of trees.

It once had a cheese factory, post office, railway station and garage, but now has only greenhouses, a school and houses. A hall was open at least from 1917 to 1928.

== History ==
The area was sparsely occupied by Ngāti Werewere of Ngāti Hauā. The nearest known archaeological site is just over the confiscation line and county boundary, about 5km towards Eureka, where a ringditch pā, Mangao Tupua, is on a small knoll at the foot of the Pakaroa Range.

Some early European traders are believed to have traversed the district prior to 1834, when the missionary, John Morgan, travelled up the Piako River and crossed to Horotiu. The 1860s saw an influx of European settlers to the area and, on 13 December 1873, a settler from Auckland, Thomas Morrin, purchased Kuranui No.1 Block. In May 1874, he bought two further blocks, Motumaoho No.1 and No.2, and hired Irish navvies from the gold fields to dig a network of ditches to drain the land, enabling it to be used for agriculture. In 1873 Motumaoho was described as being near Hangawera, a hill over 10km to the north, there being no other settlements in the area.

The other large holding in the area was Norfolk Downs. That estate was divided into smaller farms about 1911, after which there was some growth in the population.

=== Motumaoho Swamp ===
A 1963 study found much of the vegetation on Motumaoho swamp, to the north of the railway, remained as it had when it built up the peat bogs over about 13,000 years, the two dominant species being giant wire rush and wire rush. However, since then, additional drains have been put in and, by 1998, Valentine Rd had been extended across the area. The study also looked at Moanatuatua swamp, which became a scientific reserve in 1980. Floods still occur.

=== Cheese factory ===
The centre of the village is dominated by the former cheese factory. A New Zealand Dairy Association dairy was built in 1910. The cheese factory was described as new in 1912, saying the Waikato Dairy Association's offer to build and run it was accepted. However, in 1929 the cheese factory had on its wall - Norfolk Coop Dairy Co estd. 1916. The Norfolk Co-operative Dairy Company was formed in 1915, with 22 suppliers. Electric power was connected in 1923, when a new factory was approved. It was working by 1924. Norfolk Co-operative Dairy Company, Limited merged into Morrinsville Co-operative Dairy Company, Limited in 1946. The factory closed in 1983. The derelict building remains and, between 2010 and 2014, a rusting Bedford OB bus was parked beside it.

=== Flax ===
In 1926 Palmerston North-based flax miller, Fred Seifert, formed a company to develop 4,000 acres (1,600 ha) of former dairy and scrubland north of Motumaoho. He hoped to build a mill in 1929, but an old flax mill was demolished in 1928 and a shareholders tour in 1929 failed to raise capital, so no more was heard of the prothe eastect.

=== Soap ===
In 1921 soap was being made from tallow.

== Demographics ==
By 1891 41 people were living in Motumaoho and, though the 1896 census recorded only 7, 215 were in the 1916 census.

Motumaoho and its surrounds cover 27.95 km^{2} (10.79 sq mi). Motumaoho is part of the larger Tahuroa statistical area.

Historical population for Motumaoho and surrounds
Year	Pop.	±% p.a.
2006	330	—
2013	336	+0.26%
2018	345	+0.53%
2023	366	+1.19%

Motumaoho had a population of 366 in the 2023 New Zealand census, an increase of 21 people (6.1%) since the 2018 census, and an increase of 30 people (8.9%) since the 2013 census. There were 186 males and 177 females in 126 dwellings. 2.5% of people identified as LGBTIQ+. There were 78 people (21.3%) aged under 15 years, 69 (18.9%) aged 15 to 29, 168 (45.9%) aged 30 to 64, and 51 (13.9%) aged 65 or older.

People could identify as more than one ethnicity. The results were 93.4% European (Pākehā), 12.3% Māori, 4.9% Pasifika, 4.1% Asian, and 0.8% other, which includes people giving their ethnicity as "New Zealander". English was spoken by 96.7%, Māori language by 1.6%, Samoan by 0.8%, and other languages by 5.7%. No language could be spoken by 3.3% (e.g. too young to talk). The percentage of people born overseas was 12.3, compared with 28.8% nationally.

Religious affiliations were 32.8% Christian, 1.6% Buddhist, 0.8% New Age, and 1.6% other religions. People who answered that they had no religion were 57.4%, and 7.4% of people did not answer the census question.

Of those at least 15 years old, 57 (19.8%) people had a bachelor's or higher degree, 156 (54.2%) had a post-high school certificate or diploma, and 75 (26.0%) people exclusively held high school qualifications. 45 people (15.6%) earned over $100,000 compared to 12.1% nationally. The employment status of those at least 15 was that 171 (59.4%) people were employed full-time, 51 (17.7%) were part-time, and 3 (1.0%) were unemployed.

=== Tahuroa statistical area ===
Tahuroa statistical area, which surrounds Morrinsville on the north, west and south and also includes Kiwitahi, covers 179.33 km^{2} (69.24 sq mi) and had an estimated population of 1,750 as of June 2025, with a population density of 9.8 people per km^{2}.

Historical population for Tahuroa statistical area
Year	Pop.	±% p.a.
2006	1,581	—
2013	1,644	+0.56%
2018	1,659	+0.18%
2023	1,674	+0.18%
The 2006 population is for a larger area of 181.87 km^{2}. Source:

Tahuroa statistical area had a population of 1,674 in the 2023 New Zealand census, an increase of 15 people (0.9%) since the 2018 census, and an increase of 30 people (1.8%) since the 2013 census. There were 852 males, 816 females and 6 people of other genders in 597 dwellings. 1.8% of people identified as LGBTIQ+. The median age was 38.5 years (compared with 38.1 years nationally). There were 342 people (20.4%) aged under 15 years, 291 (17.4%) aged 15 to 29, 813 (48.6%) aged 30 to 64, and 234 (14.0%) aged 65 or older.

People could identify as more than one ethnicity. The results were 85.5% European (Pākehā); 15.9% Māori; 2.0% Pasifika; 4.8% Asian; 1.3% Middle Eastern, Latin American and African New Zealanders (MELAA); and 3.4% other, which includes people giving their ethnicity as "New Zealander". English was spoken by 97.5%, Māori language by 4.5%, Samoan by 0.4%, and other languages by 6.5%. No language could be spoken by 1.8% (e.g. too young to talk). New Zealand Sign Language was known by 0.5%. The percentage of people born overseas was 12.0, compared with 28.8% nationally.

Religious affiliations were 33.7% Christian, 0.4% Hindu, 0.4% Māori religious beliefs, 0.9% Buddhist, 0.4% New Age, and 1.6% other religions. People who answered that they had no religion were 55.4%, and 7.7% of people did not answer the census question.

Of those at least 15 years old, 228 (17.1%) people had a bachelor's or higher degree, 783 (58.8%) had a post-high school certificate or diploma, and 321 (24.1%) people exclusively held high school qualifications. The median income was $51,500, compared with $41,500 nationally. 168 people (12.6%) earned over $100,000 compared to 12.1% nationally. The employment status of those at least 15 was that 807 (60.6%) people were employed full-time, 207 (15.5%) were part-time, and 24 (1.8%) were unemployed.

== Education ==
Motumaoho School is on SH26. It had a roll of 28 as of July 2026, and has 3 teachers. In 1923 it had 70 children.

A request for a school was made in Parliament in 1910 and a one roomed school opened in 1912. In 1969 it was replaced by a school with a small library and a staff-room transported from Ohautira. Later changes added a library, which had been the Post Office, and a front deck.

== Commerce ==
Agriculture, at 56.9%, was the main occupation in 2013 in Tahuroa census area (to the west of Morrinsville, including Motumaoho).

=== Quarry ===
The only other significant remaining occupation is quarrying. At the end of Harbottle Road, on the slopes of the Pakaroa Range, about 4 km (2.5 mi) south of Motumaoho, Winstone Aggregates supplies road stone. The quarry contains the index fossil, minotis, dating from the middle Jurassic, Norian age. The quarry was first developed for road stone by Piako County Council in 1924 on land they leased.

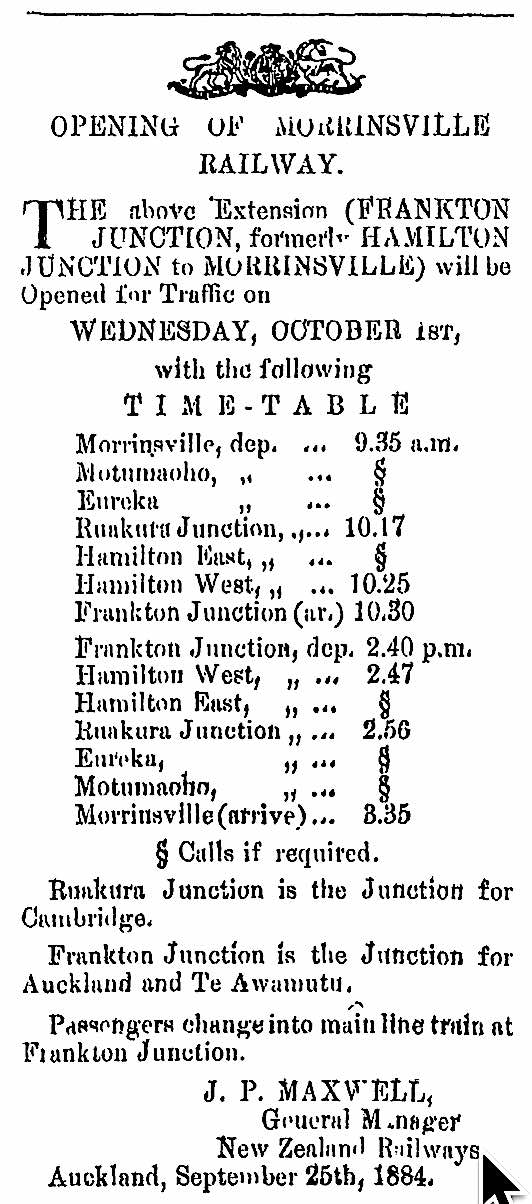
October 1884 opening timetable of Morrinsville Railway

== Transport ==
=== Road ===
SH26 through the village was sealed in about 1929. Traffic volumes have increased from 4,397 in 2008 to 4,812 in 2015.

=== Railway ===
Motumaoho railway station was a flag station on the East Coast Main Trunk line, about 3 km (1.9 mi) north of the village. It opened on 1 October 1884. By 1896 it had a shelter shed, platform and a passing loop for 27 wagons. By 1899 there was also a 4th class station building and urinals and in 1905 the loop was extended for 61 wagons. In 1912 Motumaoho became a tablet station and Railway houses were built in 1920. It had a goods shed and cattle yard, the latter built after 1936. Motumaoho closed to passengers on 31 July 1967 and to goods on 27 May 1973. The line is on a rising gradient from Morrinsville.

Preceding station	Historical railways	Following station
Eureka; Line open, station closed	East Coast Main Trunk; New Zealand Railways Department	Morrinsville; Line open, station closed

==== Incidents ====
On 6 August 1959 Leslie George Kelly, an engine driver and Māori author, was killed in a head-on collision at Motumaoho. A wagon jacknifed onto the train crew after they'd jumped from their east-bound train, which had been waiting to pass the train which ran into it.

=== Buses ===
Local buses run to Morrinsville, Hamilton and, once a day to Paeroa via Te Aroha.

=== Pipeline ===
A First Gas pumping station on Kurunui Rd is at the junction of pipelines linking the Māui pipeline at Te Kowhai with Cambridge and Waitoa.

== Notable people ==
- Joan Hart, sprinter at the 1950 British Empire Games
