= Tauwhare =

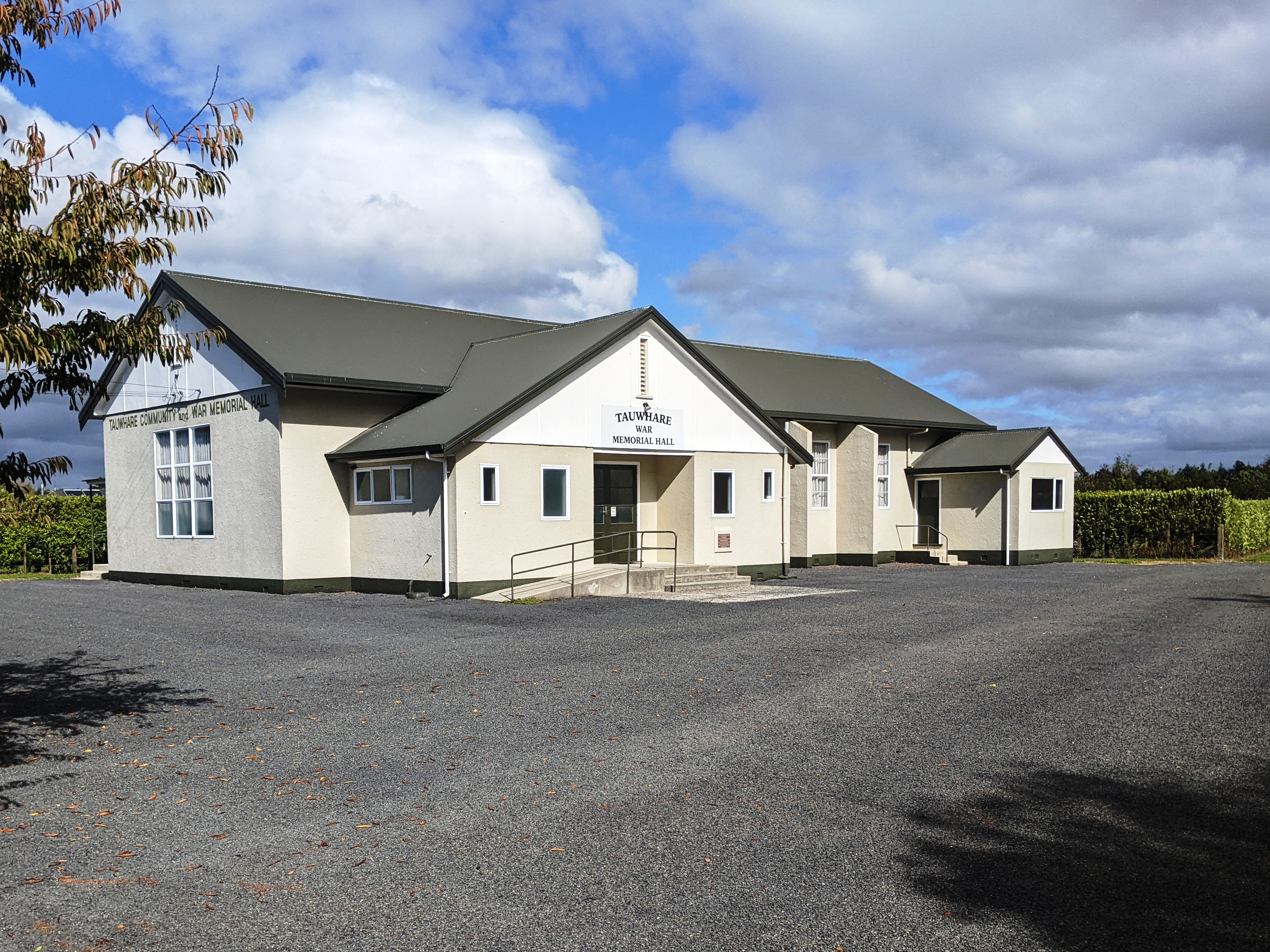
- Tauwhare Community and War Memorial Hall
- Interactive map of Tauwhare
- Coordinates: 37°46′11.4″S 175°27′33.09″E
- Country: New Zealand
- Region: Waikato
- District: Waikato District
- Wards: Tamahere-Woodlands General Ward; Tai Runga Takiwaa Maaori Ward
- Electorates: Waikato; Hauraki-Waikato (Māori)

Government
  - Territorial Authority: Waikato District Council
  - Regional council: Waikato Regional Council
  - Mayor of Waikato: Aksel Bech
  - Waikato MP: Tim van de Molen
  - Hauraki-Waikato MP: Hana-Rawhiti Maipi-Clarke

Area
  - Total: 28.24 km^{2} (10.90 sq mi)

Population (2023 Census)
  - Total: 468
  - Density: 16.6/km^{2} (42.9/sq mi)

Eureka	Morrinsville	Kiwitahi
Tamahere	Tauwhare	Te Miro
Matangi	Pukemoremore	Maungakawa

Tauwhare is a small rural community in the Waikato District on the outskirts of Hamilton, NZ. The Waitakaruru Arboretum and Sculpture Park is located here.

There is a Community Committee and a Memorial Hall. The 1902 Cyclopedia of New Zealand noted that Tauwhare had a scattered population, a school, a cheese factory (owned by the New Zealand Loan and Mercantile Agency Company) and could be reached by coach from Tamahere railway station.

== Demographics ==
The 2006 census counted a Tamahere and Tauwhare area of 130 km^{2} (50 sq mi). In 2018 Tauwhare was grouped in the Eureka Tauwhare statistical area, which covers 135.55 km^{2} (52.34 sq mi).

Historical population for Tauwhare and surrounds
Year	Pop.	±% p.a.
2006	393	—
2013	450	+1.95%
2018	444	−0.27%
2023	468	+1.06%

Tauwhare and its surrounds had a population of 468 in the 2023 New Zealand census, an increase of 24 people (5.4%) since the 2018 census, and an increase of 18 people (4.0%) since the 2013 census. There were 228 males and 240 females in 147 dwellings. 1.3% of people identified as LGBTIQ+. There were 114 people (24.4%) aged under 15 years, 78 (16.7%) aged 15 to 29, 234 (50.0%) aged 30 to 64, and 45 (9.6%) aged 65 or older.

People could identify as more than one ethnicity. The results were 86.5% European (Pākehā); 19.2% Māori; 3.8% Pasifika; 5.1% Asian; 1.3% Middle Eastern, Latin American and African New Zealanders (MELAA); and 5.1% other, which includes people giving their ethnicity as "New Zealander". English was spoken by 96.2%, Māori language by 5.1%, Samoan by 4.5%, and other languages by 10.3%. No language could be spoken by 0.6% (e.g. too young to talk). New Zealand Sign Language was known by 1.3%. The percentage of people born overseas was 17.3, compared with 28.8% nationally.

Religious affiliations were 24.4% Christian, 1.9% Māori religious beliefs, 0.6% Buddhist, 1.3% New Age, and 1.9% other religions. People who answered that they had no religion were 63.5%, and 5.8% of people did not answer the census question.

Of those at least 15 years old, 93 (26.3%) people had a bachelor's or higher degree, 201 (56.8%) had a post-high school certificate or diploma, and 66 (18.6%) people exclusively held high school qualifications. 75 people (21.2%) earned over $100,000 compared to 12.1% nationally. The employment status of those at least 15 was that 237 (66.9%) people were employed full-time and 54 (15.3%) were part-time.

== Marae ==
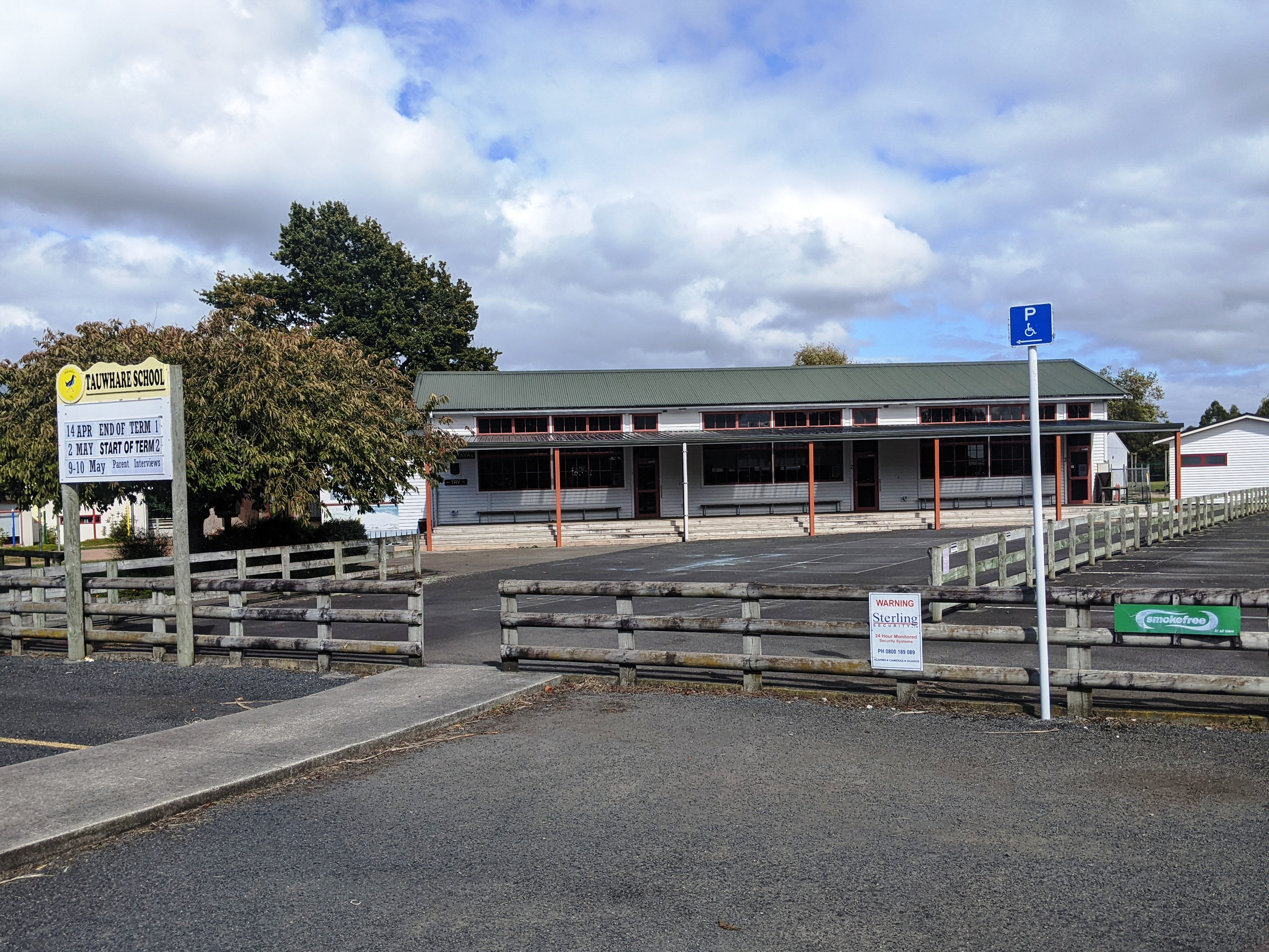
Tauwhare School

Te Iti o Hauā Marae is the mana whenua in Tauwhare of the local sub-tribe of the same name of Ngāti Hauā. The people here belong to the Mangaonua river. Waimakariri Marae and Waenganui meeting house is a meeting place for the Ngāti Hauā hapū of Ngāti Waenganui and Ngāti Waenganui, and the Waikato Tainui hapū of Ngāti Hauā.

In October 2020, the Government committed $734,311 from the Provincial Growth Fund to upgrade the marae and 4 other Ngāti Hauā marae, creating 7 jobs.

== Education ==
Tauwhare School is a co-educational state primary school for Year 1 to 6 students, with a roll of 114 as of July 2026. The school opened in 1884.
