= Henry Goulstone =

New Zealand banker and financier

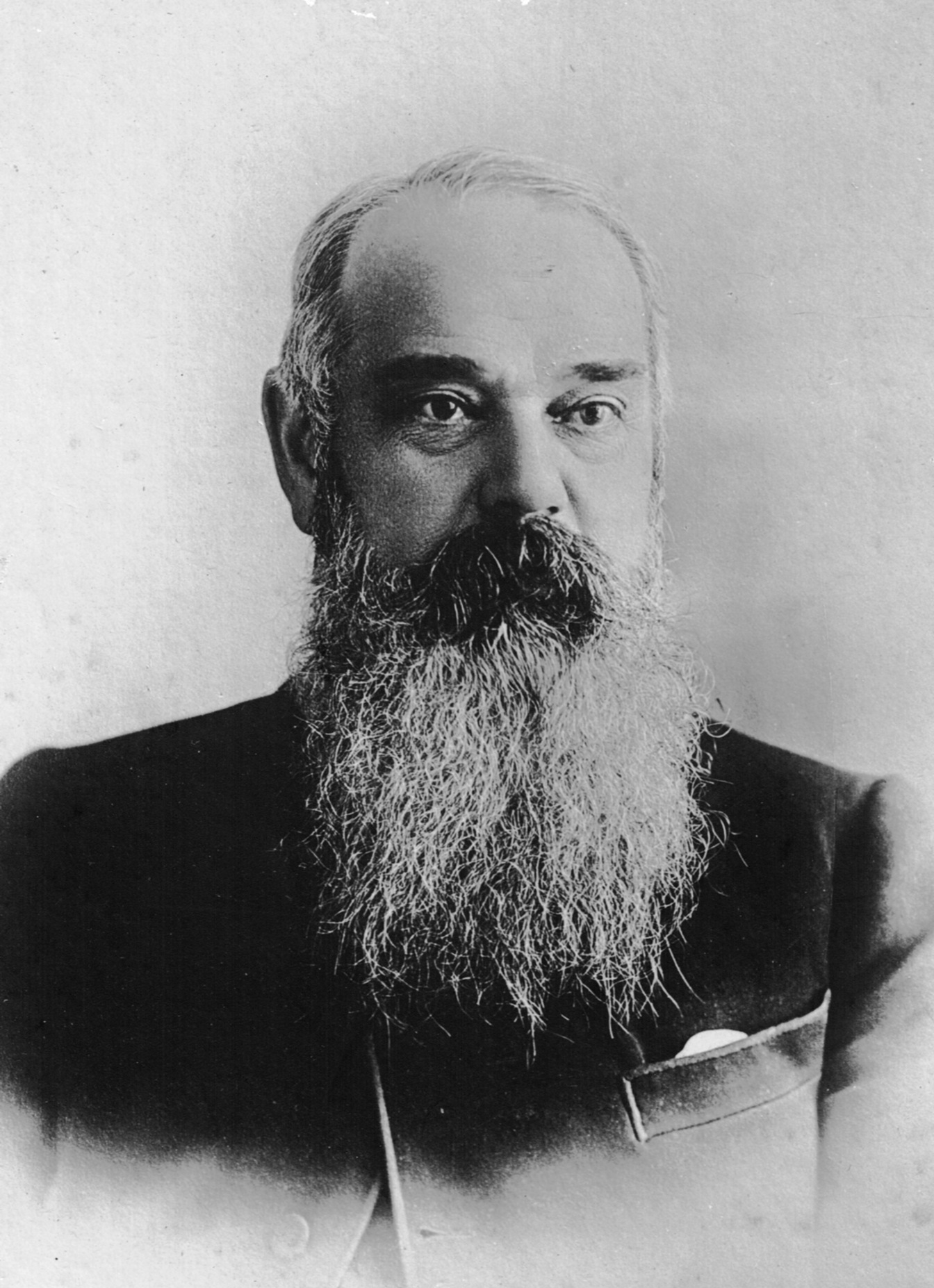
- Henry Goulstone
- Born: Henry Goulstone; 22 October 1836; Long Ashton, England
- Died: 20 March 1914 (aged 77); Auckland, New Zealand
- Occupations: Accountant and Bank Manager

Henry Goulstone (bap. 28 November 1835 – 20 March 1914) was an early British immigrant to New Zealand, where he was a financier and magistrate.

== Biography ==
Goulstone was baptised on 28 November 1835 at St John the Baptist Church, Bedminster, England. He was the ninth child of 12 children. All were baptised in the Church of England faith. His father was school master and proprietor of the Ashton Gate Academy.

In 1841, at the age of five, he was living with his parents and seven of his brothers and sisters in North Street, Bedminster, Bristol.

Goulstone arrived in Melbourne, Australia, on 29 March 1858, having sailed alone from Liverpool on the Tornado.

From Melbourne, Goulstone moved on to Queensland, and lived for about three years in a small place called Darling Downs, where he ran his own business. However, he had to leave the locality on account of his health. On 11 May 1860 Goulstone arrived in Sydney, having sailed from Brisbane on the ship the Telegraph of Sydney. Just over a week later on 19 May he married Mary Sayer Cox, a 25 year old single woman from Yatton, Somerset.

Their first child, Newton Henry, was born on 1 July 1861, at Belgrave Terrace, Sydney. On 5 August 1861 Goulstone started work at the Sydney head office of the Bank of New South Wales.

Sometime between August 1861 and January 1862 the family moved to Auckland, New Zealand and on 4 January 1862, Goulstone was appointed as the Acting Accountant, Bank of New South Wales, Auckland, at a salary of £300 per annum.

Goulstone quickly rose through the ranks of the bank and he moved with his family to Napier where he was made acting bank manager on 30 October 1862. This was to be a short stay as the branch was closed on 7 December 1863, though long enough for Mary to give birth to their second son, William Fitzhugh. While in Napier Goulstone took part in the Anniversary Day Rifle Shooting contest on 16 November 1863.

On 1 April 1863, Goulstone sent a note to Donald McLean, confirming an appointment with him for the following day. Unfortunately no account of the meeting has been uncovered, so it is presently a mystery as to why Goulstone went to see Sir Donald. The letter (at right), is currently the only surviving written document of him.

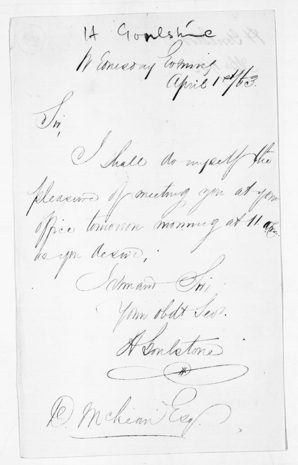
Letter Written by Henry Goulstone

From Napier, Goulstone and his family moved to the South Island, and in 1865, Mary gave birth to their first daughter, Amy Florence, in Lyttelton. This time in Lyttelton could have been a brief holiday or interlude between postings with the bank. It is maybe possible that his wife, Mary, stayed by herself in Lyttelton, with friends or relatives, while he continued with his bank work in Auckland.

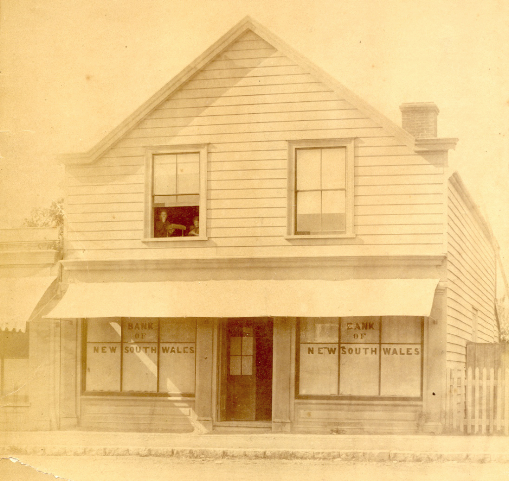
Nelson Branch of the Bank of New South Wales, circa 1865

After much moving around, Goulstone, his wife and their three young children settled in Nelson and on 8 September 1865 Goulstone was made Acting Bank Manager of the Nelson branch of the Bank of New South Wales, at a salary of £500 per annum.

While in Nelson, Goulstone played cricket for the bank, one such annual fixture being reported on in the Nelson Examiner. On 29 March 1869 Goulstone opened the batting for the Banks Eleven vs the College Eleven. He made 15 in the first innings and 1 in the second and took one catch. The bank beat the college by two wickets.

On 18 April 1869, the first Royal visitor to New Zealand, Alfred, Duke of Saxe-Coburg and Gotha and Duke of Edinburgh, arrived in Nelson as captain of HMS Galatea. The Duke was the second son of Queen Victoria and Prince Albert. There was a very large welcome put on for the Duke, with many dignitaries and speakers. Goulstone himself was among the invited guests to personally meet with the Duke.

Two of Goulstone's donations to causes of the day were recorded by the local paper. Firstly, in June 1866, Goulstone donated the sum of two pounds and two shillings to the New Zealand Patriotic Fund. Later that same year in August, there was a very large fire in Nelson that destroyed 18 homes, Goulstone donated two pounds to the fire relief fund.

On 14 June 1873, Goulstone was elected by the ratepayers to the Nelson Education Board. The meeting and election took place at the Nelson Court-house. In this capacity as a board member, Goulstone took the chair at the annual Town Schools prize giving in December 1873, this included the giving of a short speech and the overseeing of the presentation of the prizes.

While in Nelson, Goulstone became a Magistrate, and in such capacity took part in the Annual Licensing meeting held on 20 June 1871. Goulstone and four other magistrates met to hear any new liquor applications and also to oversee the correct behaviour of the 40 Public Houses that were already in operation in the Nelson area. At this meeting one new application was granted to the Mitre Hotel.

Also in his capacity as a Magistrate, Goulstone had had to sit on the jury of the Supreme Court of Nelson on numerous occasions. Three such occasions where Goulstone was a juror were recorded in the local paper as follows:

1. Civil Sitting, Monday 13 July 1868, Trimble vs New Zealand Insurance.
2. Civil Sitting, 9 and 10 August 1871, Pike vs Travers. This was an action to recover the sum of one thousand five hundred pounds, the amount of a promissory note, with interest since September 1864.
3. Criminal Sittings, Monday 20 November 1871. This included the trying of six criminal cases, none of a very serious nature.

In 1866 Goulstone briefly gave evidence in the Maungatapu murders trial, in his capacity as the acting manager of the Bank of New South Wales. This was in relation to whether he saw one of the accused come into his bank and exchange some money.

Goulstone was a founding investor and share holder in the Perseverance Mining Company. The company was formed on 15 January 1870 to mine for gold in the Bedstead Gully and Golden Gully area, in Golden Bay. To this end the company leased 16 1/2 acres of crown land in this area for a period of 15 years. The company went out of business in the late 1870s, with another company taking over the mine site in 1879. Goulstone was also a director of the company from its founding up until 21 November 1870 when he stepped down. However, as of 8 March 1871 he was still a shareholder, attending a special general meeting of the company as such.

=== Children in Nelson ===
Another son was born to them, on 7 November 1867, Harold James Goulstone. On 24 September 1870, Mary gave birth to triplets - two boys (Cyril Thorpe and Alexander) and a girl (Ella Margaret Irene). Sadly, less than three months later, Cyril died of 'debility'. And just a couple of weeks before his second birthday, Alexander died of 'congestion of the lungs' (probably tuberculosis). Agnes Lillias was born on 12 May 1873, and their fourth and last daughter, Rosa Theodora, on 25 September 1875. Goulstone resigned from the bank on 31 October 1875 and they moved back to Auckland.

=== Auckland ===
In Auckland, Goulstone undertook a number of roles and employment. He joined the New Zealand Loan and Mercantile Agency Company as its colonial accountant. In 1902 he was Secretary of the Auckland Fire Underwriters' Association, and also of the Mackelvie Trust. In 1904 he was the Secretary of the Auckland Chamber of Commerce. Goulstone also undertook auditing work. For example, he was the auditor of Sharland and Co. (Limited) from the early 1890s up until December 1907 when he had to resign due to ill health.

Later in 1877, Goulstone returned, by himself, to Sydney, arriving there on 26 November on the Rotorua. He started work back at the head office of the Bank of New South Wales on 3 December. He was put in temporary charge of the Balmain branch on 25 April 1878, returned to head office on 7 June, and resigned on 30 September 1878. Goulstone returned to Auckland on the Hero on 8 October 1878.

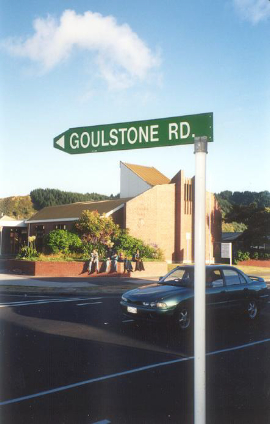
Goulstone Road, Whakatane

Sometime between 1878 and 1881, Goulstone bought a farm in Whakatāne. But by 1885 he was back in Auckland, and the farm was sold in 1913. Goulstone Road in Whakatāne is named after this short farming stint.

== Funerals and marriages ==
Henry and Mary Goulstone now lived in Park Road, Newmarket. During 1883 his wife, Mary, contracted tuberculosis and died two years later. She was buried at the Symonds Street Cemetery.

On 23 December 1887 he married Mabel Anna Louisa Roskruge in St John the Evangelist Chapel, Meadowbank. Mabel came from Cornwall, England. She moved to New Zealand with her family when she was nine years old, in 1863. Henry and Mabel had two children together, both girls – Cecil Mary in 1889 and Lucy Beatrice in 1892. Unfortunately, though, tragedy was again to befall Goulstone, twofold. On 24 March 1891 his second daughter, Ella, died, at just 20 years of age of tuberculosis at the family home in Park Road. Henry's wife, Mabel, also died from tuberculosis on 12 June 1893. She was buried at Purewa Cemetery two days later.

On 25 March 1896 Goulstone married his third wife, Margaret Alice Haslett. This wedding took place at the home of her brother, James Haslett, Eden Street, Auckland. Margaret was born in Belfast, Ireland and came to New Zealand with her family in 1860 at the age of seven. She outlived Henry by man years, dying on 21 June 1945 aged 92 of heart failure.

Henry Goulstone spent the last days of his life with Margaret at Park Road, Newmarket, then Pentland Avenue, Mount Eden.. He died 20 March 1914 at the age of 78 years. The cause of death was listed as 'Senile degeneration and cerebral atrophy'.

Goulstone had amassed quite some wealth at the time of his death, his estate was listed for Stamp Duty at £10,284. Goulstone left a watch, silver salver and other various pieces of crockery to his three daughters – Amy, Agnes and Rosa. The remainder of his estate was left in trust to his wife, Margaret.

Henry Goulstone was buried on 21 March at Purewa Cemetery in Auckland.
