= Kiwitahi =

- Interactive map of Kiwitahi
- Coordinates: 37.739495°S 175.584226°E
- Country: New Zealand
- Region: Waikato
- District: Matamata-Piako District
- Ward: Morrinsville General Ward
- Electorates: Waikato; Hauraki-Waikato (Māori)

Government
  - Territorial Authority: Matamata-Piako District Council
  - Regional council: Waikato Regional Council
  - Mayor of Matamata-Piako: Ash Tanner
  - Waikato MP: Tim van de Molen
  - Hauraki-Waikato MP: Hana-Rawhiti Maipi-Clarke

Area
  - Total: 19.19 km^{2} (7.41 sq mi)

Population (2023 Census)
  - Total: 138
  - Density: 7.19/km^{2} (18.6/sq mi)
- Time zone: UTC+12 (NZST)
  - Summer (DST): UTC+13 (NZDT)
- Postcode: 3371
- Area code: 07

Kiwitahi is a rural community in the Matamata-Piako District and Waikato region of New Zealand's North Island, located directly south of Morrinsville.

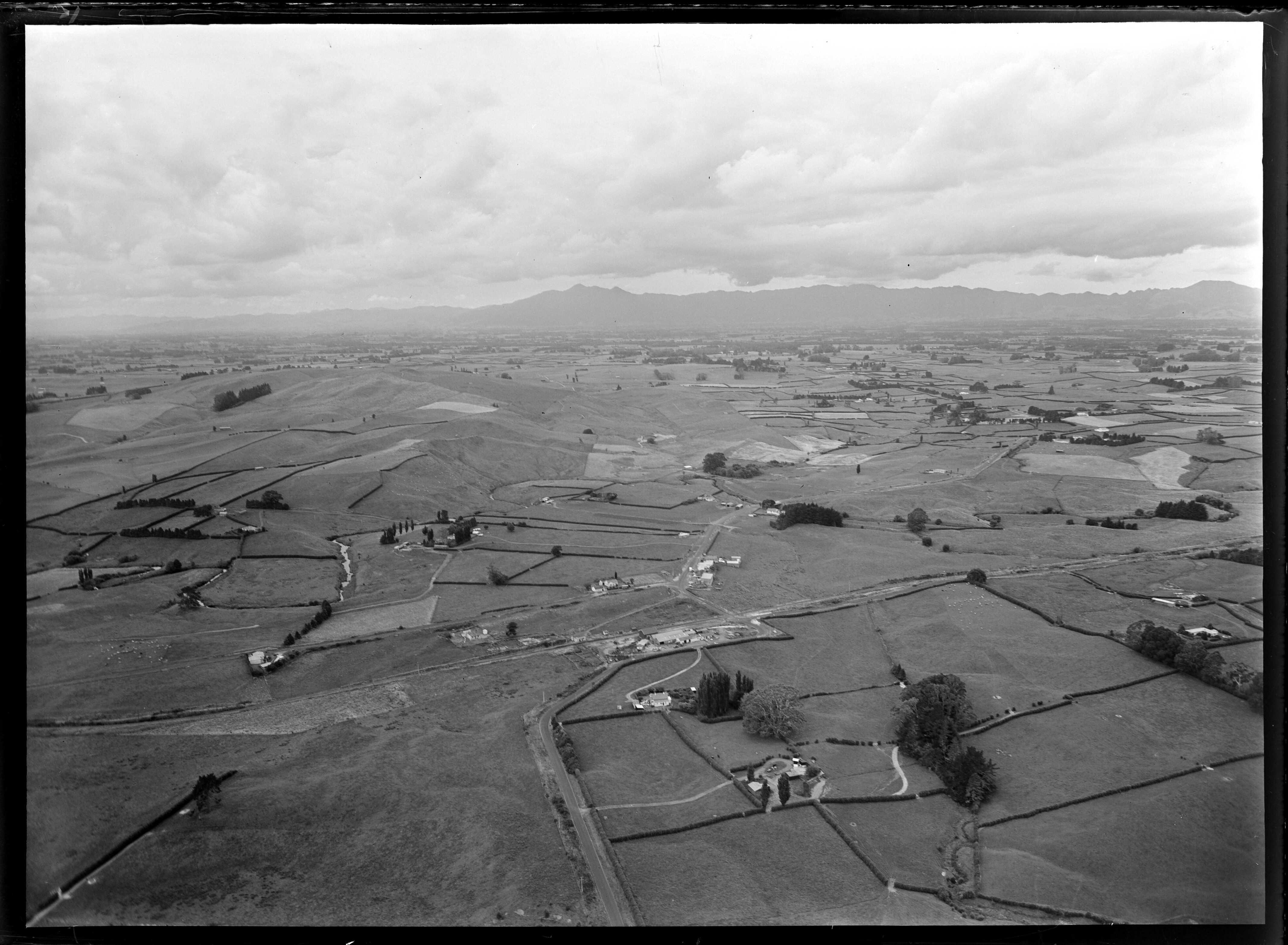
Aerial view of Kiwitahi

The community has a school and a local hall that accommodates up to 120 people.

== Geography ==
The Kiwitahi district originally comprised 30,000 acres (12,000 ha). The district is now smaller with some of the land becoming part of the Tahuroa district.

== History ==
Kiwitahi was occupied by Māori before being converted into farmland by European settlers from the 1870s.

William Chepmell established a 690-acre farm at Kiwitahi in 1871, which he continued operating through the depression of the 1880s and 1890s without having to sell or subdivide. He led a campaign for a road between Morrinsville and Thames and became a politician, serving on the Piako Council and Waitoa Road Board at various times between 1887 and 1914. The remoteness of Kiwitahi meant he would have ridden approximately 56,000 km total to attend council and road board meetings.

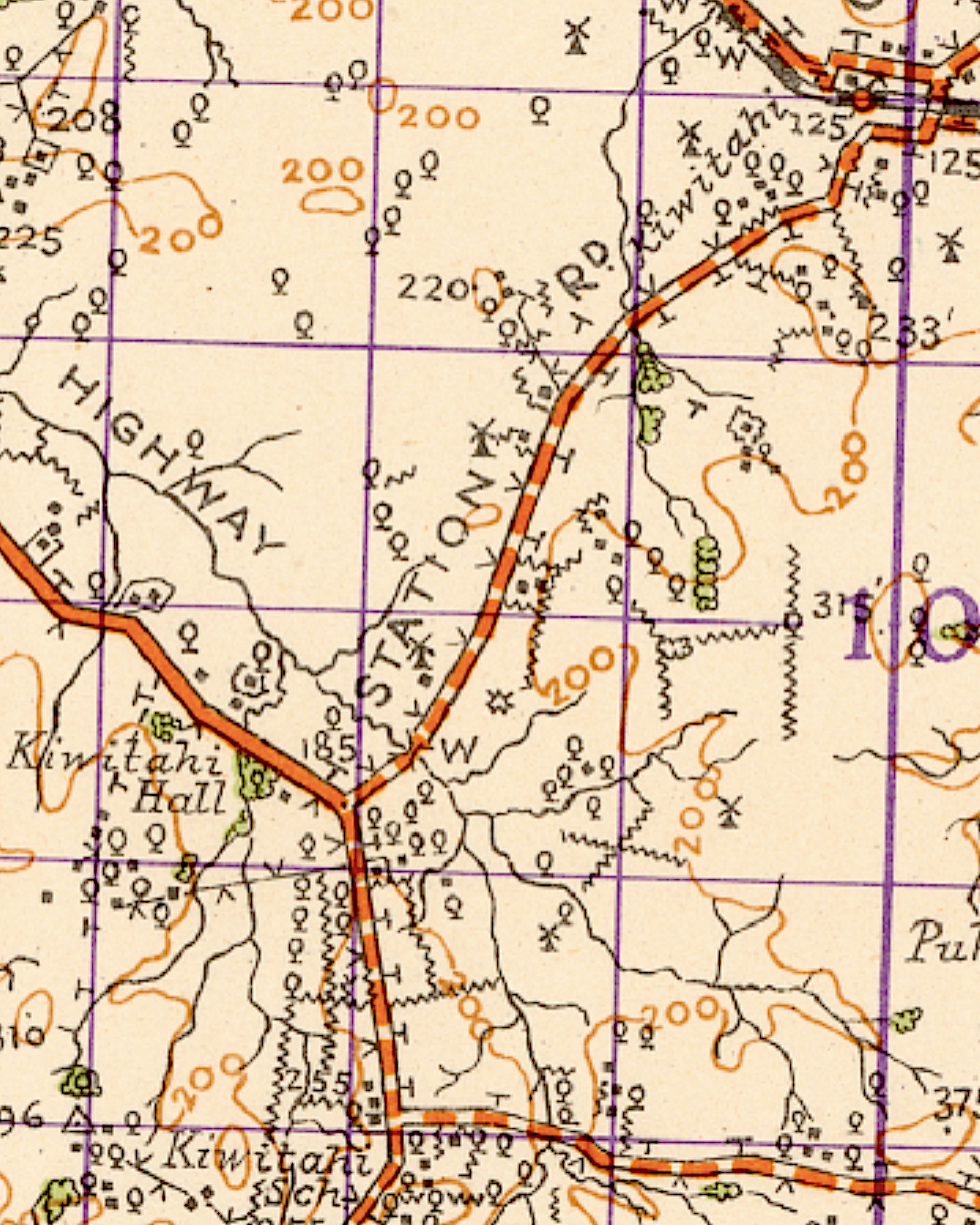
Kiwitahi on 1944 map

In 1985, Chepmell helped fund the construction of an Anglican church. In 1900, he pushed for a school to be built in Kiwitahi despite his own reservations about public education. The school eventually opened thirteen years later.

By 1902 Cyclopedia of New Zealand described Kiwitahi as having "fine grazing farms" and a railway station.

New Zealand Co-operative Dairy Company Ltd had a cheese factory near the railway station, from 1919, until it burnt down on 9 October 1937, by which time it was producing casein.

In 1923 a poll was held to decide on funding road metalling and there were about 40 or 50 settlers.

Chepmell died in 1930. His farm was brought by the Government after World War II, and subdivided for settling returned servicemen back to the land.

During the 1930s the hills around Kiwitahi were infested with rabbits. By the 1960s the pasture in the area was highly sought-after due to extensive eradication efforts by the Kiwitahi Rabbit Board.

In 1960 the Piako County Council established a Māori housing settlement in Kiwitahi to replace earlier homes that were demolished in Waharoa.

=== Railway station ===
Kiwitahi had a flag station about 4 mi (6.4 km) from the village, on the East Coast Main Trunk, opened from Morrinsville to Tīrau (then called Oxford) on Monday 8 March 1886 by the Thames Valley & Rotorua Railway Co. New Zealand Railways Department took over the line on 1 April 1886. By 1896 Kiwitahi had a 14 ft (4.3 m) by 8 ft (2.4 m) shelter shed, platform, cart approach, loading bank, cattle yards, two cottages and a passing loop for 19 wagons, extended to 34 by 1911 and 53 by 1964.

In 1898 there was a petition for a goods shed and, in 1905, there was a record that a new goods shed had been built at Waitakere and the old one re-erected at Kiwitahi. However, a 1924 report said that a 40 ft (12 m) by 30 ft (9.1 m) shed was about to be built. There was a shed opposite the shelter after the station closed. Sheep yards were added between 1887 and 1911. In 1912 it was noted that a tablet porter required. In the 1930s the porter established a garden at the station. In 1937 the stockyards were extended and electric lights replaced the oil lamps. In 1918 the Returned Services Association got a Post Office opened at the station. It closed in 1947. There was also a store and petrol pump next to the station from 1923 to 1934.

Kiwitahi station closed to passengers on 12 November 1968 and to goods on 17 July 1972. There is now only a single track through the station site. There is a passing loop at Kereone, 3.81 km (2.37 mi) to the south.

| | Former adjoining stations | |
| Morrinsville; Line open, station closed 9.01 km (5.60 mi) | East Coast Main Trunk | Walton; Line open, station closed 9.54 km (5.93 mi) |

== Demographics ==
Kiwitahi and its surrounds cover 19.19 km^{2} (7.41 sq mi). Kiwitahi is part of the larger Tahuroa statistical area.

Historical population for Kiwitahi and surrounds
| Year | Pop. | ±% p.a. |
|---|---|---|
| 2006 | 150 | — |
| 2013 | 174 | +2.14% |
| 2018 | 162 | −1.42% |
| 2023 | 138 | −3.16% |

Kiwitahi had a population of 138 in the 2023 New Zealand census, a decrease of 24 people (−14.8%) since the 2018 census, and a decrease of 36 people (−20.7%) since the 2013 census. There were 75 males and 60 females in 54 dwellings. 2.2% of people identified as LGBTIQ+. The median age was 40.9 years (compared with 38.1 years nationally). There were 24 people (17.4%) aged under 15 years, 27 (19.6%) aged 15 to 29, 72 (52.2%) aged 30 to 64, and 15 (10.9%) aged 65 or older.

People could identify as more than one ethnicity. The results were 84.8% European (Pākehā), 6.5% Māori, and 10.9% Asian. English was spoken by 97.8%, Māori language by 2.2%, and other languages by 10.9%. The percentage of people born overseas was 23.9, compared with 28.8% nationally.

Religious affiliations were 41.3% Christian, 2.2% Buddhist, and 2.2% other religions. People who answered that they had no religion were 45.7%, and 6.5% of people did not answer the census question.

Of those at least 15 years old, 24 (21.1%) people had a bachelor's or higher degree, 75 (65.8%) had a post-high school certificate or diploma, and 21 (18.4%) people exclusively held high school qualifications. The median income was $60,800, compared with $41,500 nationally. 15 people (13.2%) earned over $100,000 compared to 12.1% nationally. The employment status of those at least 15 was that 72 (63.2%) people were employed full-time, 21 (18.4%) were part-time, and 6 (5.3%) were unemployed.

== Ecology ==
A water quality, water flow and ecology monitoring station is located at on the Piako River at Kiwitahi. It is open with a one-metre fenced off buffer on either side of the stream and no riparian planting. Macrophytes choke the softy, silty riverbed during the summer, but are often removed during the winter floods.

== Education ==
Kiwitahi School is a co-educational state primary school for Year 1 to 6 students, with a roll of 94 as of July 2026.

The first application for a school in Kiwitahi was in 1900; however, it was unsuccessful due to a lack of children, in 1913 the application was approved and the school was constructed that year. Kiwitahi School held Golden Jubilee celebrations in 1963.
