= Beeville community =

Agricultural colony in Orini, New Zealand

Beeville was a self-sufficient community located in Orini, New Zealand from 1933 to 1975. It was founded by Ray Hansen and his wife Olive, and eventually grew to include his brother Dan Hansen and others.

The community was known as "Beeville" for its high quality honey, which was its primary source of income for the community. Members followed principles of vegetarianism and pacifism.

Beeville was an active and self-sustaining community for more than 40 years.

== History ==
Beeville began in 1933 as an intentional community. The community was founded by Ray Hansen (1910-1985) and his wife Olive. Anne Sanders joined the Hansen household in 1937. Hansen had a total of fourteen children, made up of ten from Olive, and four from Anne Sanders.

Beeville's history began with the philosophy of Theosophy, of which Ray Hansen and his brothers were all followers. By 1959, this had shifted to following the teachings of Jiddu Krishnamurti. This did not interfere with the community's interaction with the Theosophy Society. As late as 1970, the Hansens were showing Krishnamurti films and were still involved with Theosophical community in Orewa and the Theosophical Society convention.

Ray's brother, Dan Hansen (1918-2006), joined the community in 1944 with his wife, Edith. Dan was a parapalegic and unable to have children, so it was arranged for one of Ray's sons to impregnate Edith. Dan and Edith Hansen left Beeville to start the Wilderland community in 1964, which by the 1970s had twenty to thirty members.

In the late 1950s, the Young Theosophist featured an article on the Beeville community, which at the time had a population of 23. The Beeville community closed in 1975 when it had declined to only three members.

== Principles ==
Beeville was a self-sufficient as a community, financing itself primarily through selling high quality honey. Additional community income came from selling produce via a roadside stand. Income was generally distributed through the concept of a common purse. However, there were times when income was distributed on a set basis, with the occasional issues of dealing with members who did not contribute to the community.

Beeville had precepts and principles that typically categorize an anarchist settlement. However, while the community rejected leaders and authority, Ray Hansen was a supporter of capitalistic ideas.

The community followed principles of vegetarianism, which aligned with its interest in Eastern religions.

Members of the Beeville community were pacifists. Founder Ray Hansen was opposed to war and military service, which occasionally led to conflicts with the New Zealand government.
