= Waitākere, New Zealand =

Waitākere Township
- Suburb
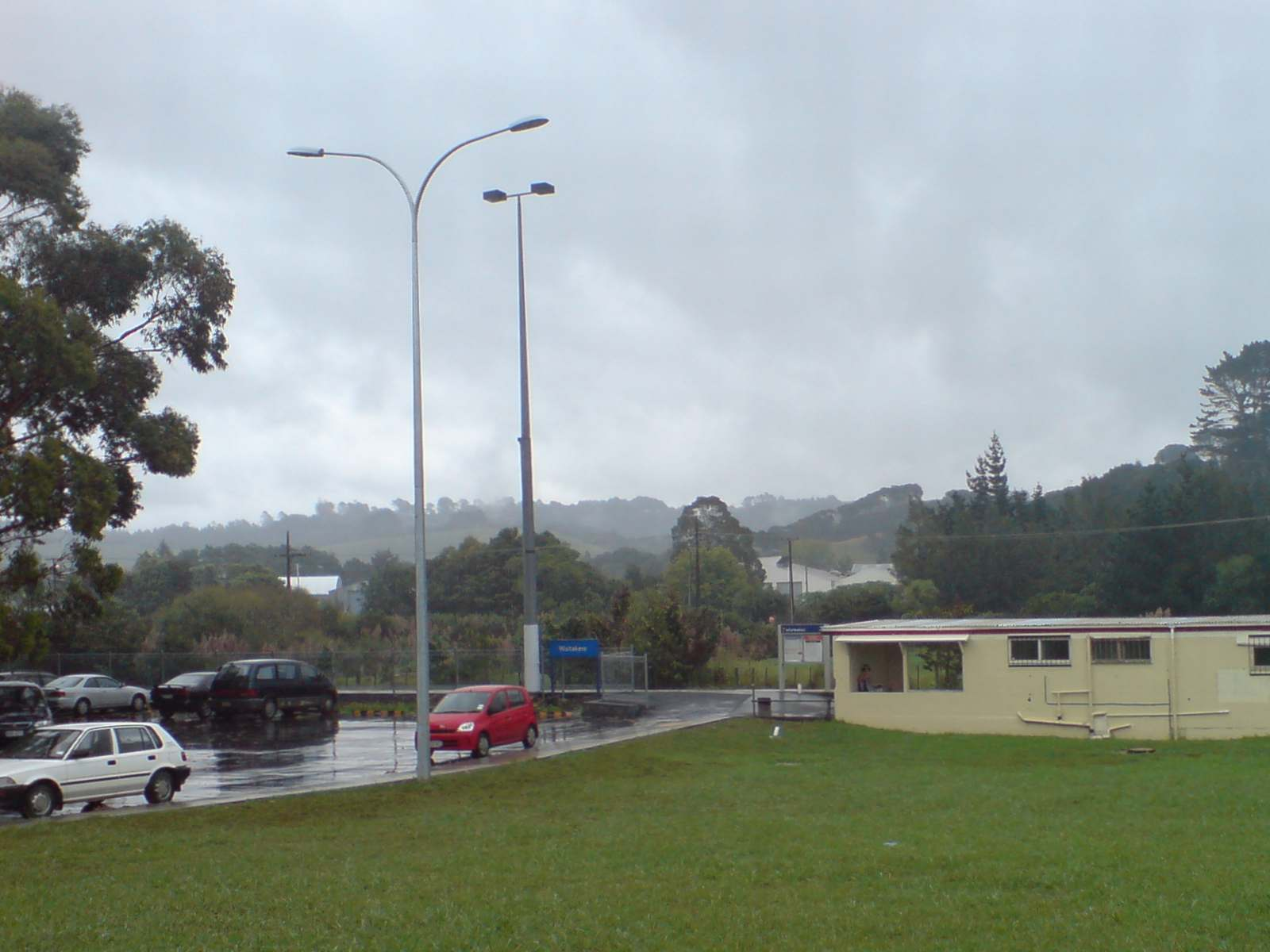
- Interactive map of Waitākere Township
- Coordinates: 36.850°S 174.543°E
- Country: New Zealand
- City: Auckland
- Local authority: Auckland Council
- Electoral ward: Waitākere ward
- Local board: Waitākere Ranges Local Board

Area
  - Land: 1,479 ha (3,650 acres)

Population (June 2025)
  - Total: 1,830
  - Density: 124/km^{2} (320/sq mi)
- Train stations: Waitakere railway station

Waimauku	Taupaki	Massey
Muriwai	Waitākere	Massey
Te Henga / Bethells Beach	(Waitākere Ranges)	Swanson

Waitākere, often called Waitākere Township or Waitākere Town, is a small, mostly rural settlement to the northwest of Auckland, New Zealand.

== History ==
The settlement is in the traditional rohe of Te Kawerau ā Maki. The many hills of the area were known as Ngā Rau Pou ā Maki, referring to the eponymous ancestor of the tribe.

During the latter 19th century, the King brothers established a flax mill at Waitākere. In 1881, the Waitākere railway station was opened, when the North Auckland Line was extended from New Lynn to Helensville.

Waitakere Road had two bridges constructed to bypass the now Township Road making it a dead-end or cul-de-sac.

== Demographics ==
Waitākere covers 14.79 km^{2} (5.71 sq mi) and had an estimated population of 1,830 as of June 2025, with a population density of 124 people per km^{2}.

Historical population
Year	Pop.	±% p.a.
2006	1,755	—
2013	1,674	−0.67%
2018	1,818	+1.66%
2023	1,812	−0.07%
The 2006 population is for a larger area of 15.29 km^{2} Source:

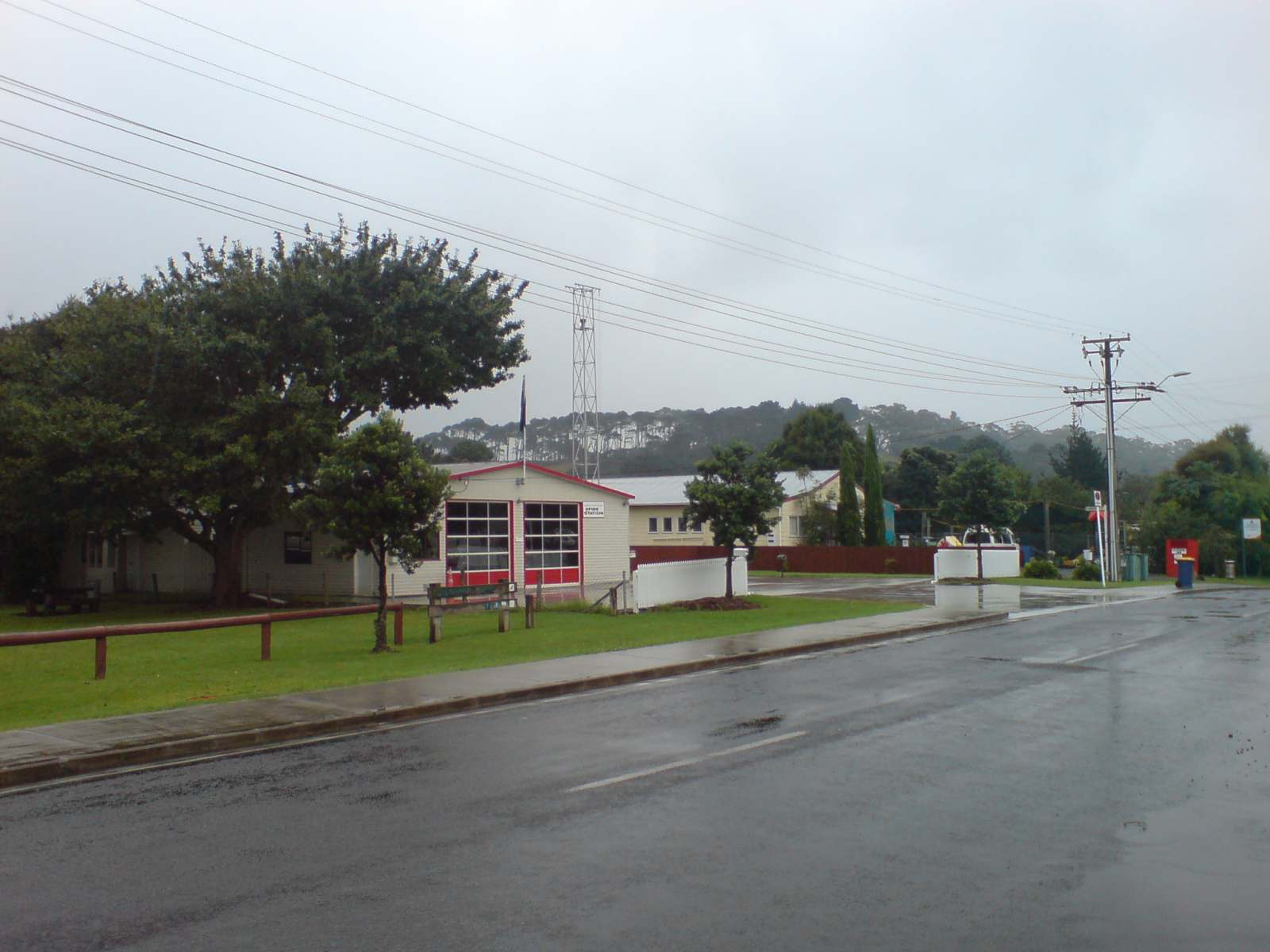
The fire station in Waitakere, near Waitakere railway station.

Waitākere had a population of 1,812 in the 2023 New Zealand census, a decrease of 6 people (−0.3%) since the 2018 census, and an increase of 138 people (8.2%) since the 2013 census. There were 906 males, 900 females and 9 people of other genders in 612 dwellings. 2.8% of people identified as LGBTIQ+. The median age was 41.7 years (compared with 38.1 years nationally). There were 360 people (19.9%) aged under 15 years, 282 (15.6%) aged 15 to 29, 933 (51.5%) aged 30 to 64, and 237 (13.1%) aged 65 or older.

People could identify as more than one ethnicity. The results were 90.7% European (Pākehā); 14.6% Māori; 7.6% Pasifika; 5.5% Asian; 0.8% Middle Eastern, Latin American and African New Zealanders (MELAA); and 3.0% other, which includes people giving their ethnicity as "New Zealander". English was spoken by 98.0%, Māori language by 2.6%, Samoan by 0.5%, and other languages by 7.8%. No language could be spoken by 1.3% (e.g. too young to talk). New Zealand Sign Language was known by 0.2%. The percentage of people born overseas was 20.4, compared with 28.8% nationally.

Religious affiliations were 22.0% Christian, 1.0% Hindu, 0.7% Islam, 0.3% Māori religious beliefs, 0.2% Buddhist, 0.8% New Age, and 1.7% other religions. People who answered that they had no religion were 65.6%, and 7.6% of people did not answer the census question.

Of those at least 15 years old, 249 (17.1%) people had a bachelor's or higher degree, 798 (55.0%) had a post-high school certificate or diploma, and 306 (21.1%) people exclusively held high school qualifications. The median income was $51,100, compared with $41,500 nationally. 234 people (16.1%) earned over $100,000 compared to 12.1% nationally. The employment status of those at least 15 was that 861 (59.3%) people were employed full-time, 216 (14.9%) were part-time, and 33 (2.3%) were unemployed.

== Education ==
Waitakere School is a coeducational full primary (years 1–8) school with a roll of 391 students as at March 2026. It was established in 1921.

== List of places within Waitakere township ==
- Waitakere RSA
- Waitakere Dairy & Postshop there was an armed robbery in 2017.
- Waitakere railway station
- Waitakere Township Hall
- Waitakere War Memorial Park
- Waitakere Fire Station
- Waitakere Kindergarten

== Notable people ==
- Arthur "Artie" Campbell Jonkers Artie was a well known figure on the family farm in Waitakere township where he worked tirelessly farming sheep.

== See also ==
- Waitakere City
