= Waitakaruru Stream =

Coordinates: 37°47′S 175°28′E

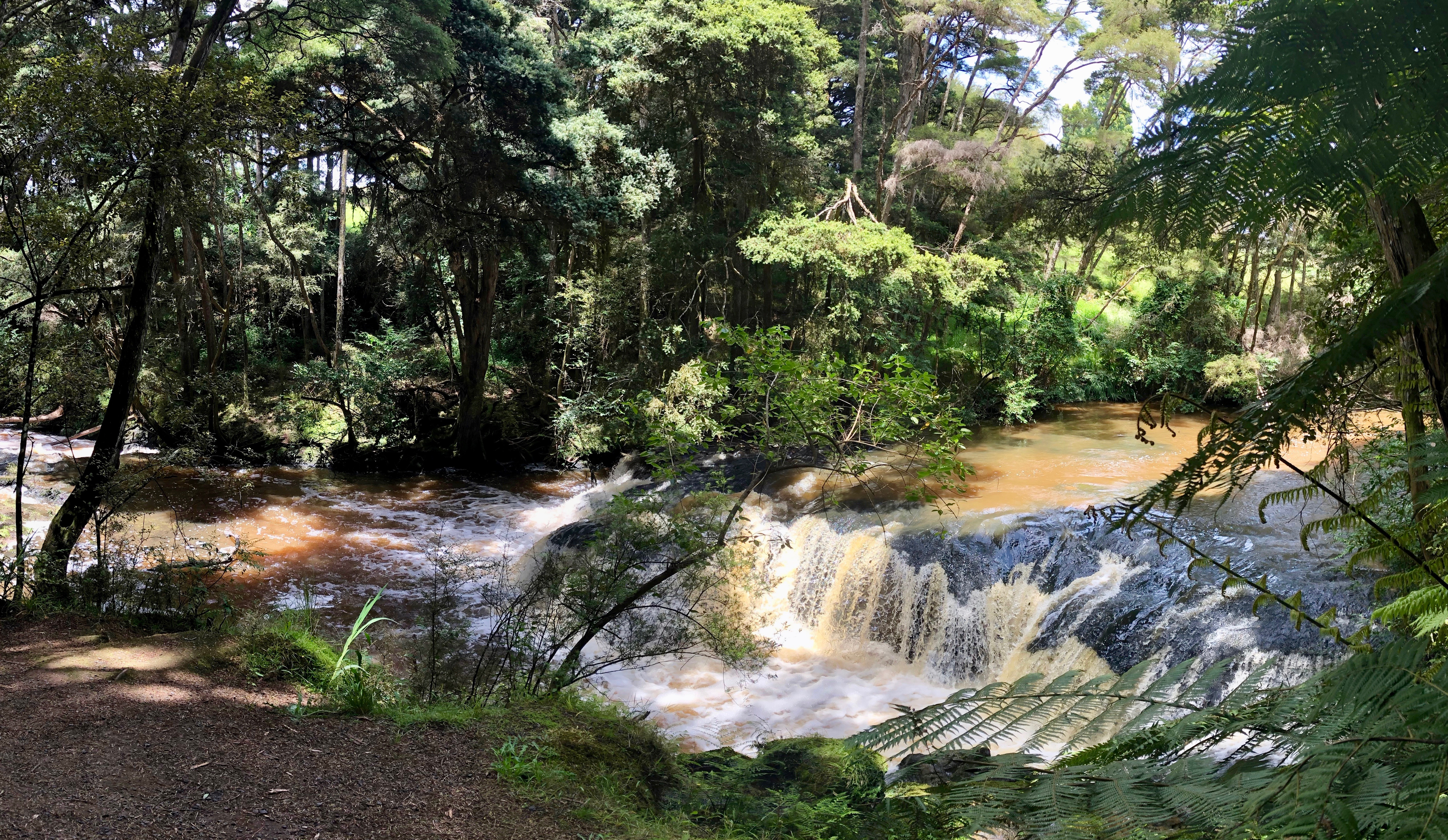
- Waterfall on the Waitakaruru Stream, beside the Morrinsville River Walk

Location
- Country: New Zealand

Physical characteristics
- Source
  - location: Te Miro-Tahuroa Hills
  - elevation: 350 m (1,150 ft)
- Mouth
  - location: Piako River, at Morrinsville
  - elevation: 20 m (66 ft)
- Length: 25 km (16 mi)
- Basin size: 175 km^{2} (68 sq mi)
- Discharge
  - average: 1.5 m^{3}/s (53 cu ft/s)

The Waitakaruru Stream is a major tributary of the Piako River, within the Waikato region of New Zealand's North Island.

The Waitakaruru Stream has its origin in the Te Miro-Tahuroa Hills south of Morrinsville, within the Waikato District. Initially the stream flows south and south-west through Scotsman's Valley before turning northwards at Tauwhare flowing roughly parallel to the Pakaroa Range as it passes the boundary of Eureka before entering the Matamata-Piako District. The stream passes through the settlement of Motumaoho, progressively turning a more easterly direction towards Morrinsville, where it has a 1.8 km (1.1 mi) walkway beside it and converges with the larger Piako River on southern outskirts of the town.

The stream catchment is highly modified by agriculture, ranging from sheep, beef and dairy farming. Parts of the middle catchment are prone to minor flooding due to a natural constriction in the stream channel between Eureka and Motumaoho. The stream is part of the Eureka Drainage Scheme, managed by the Waikato Regional Council.

The Waitakaruru Stream is notable in that it forms part of the catchment boundary between the Piako River catchment and the Waikato River catchment. The Piako River drains into the Firth of Thames, and ultimately the Pacific Ocean, while the Waikato River drains into the Tasman Sea. The bordering sub-catchment which feeds the Waikato River is the Mangaonua Stream. It also has a tributary named Waitakaruru Stream.

Near its source, in the Scotsman Valley area, the stream has short- and long-fin eels, common bully, torrentfish and koura.

== See also ==
- List of rivers of New Zealand
