= Alfred Seifert (flax miller) =

New Zealand businessman

Alfred Seifert (1877–1945) was a notable New Zealand flax-miller and promoter, farm developer. He was born in Loburn North, North Canterbury, New Zealand in 1877.
