= Waitākere railway station =

Defunct railway station in Auckland, New Zealand

Waitākere
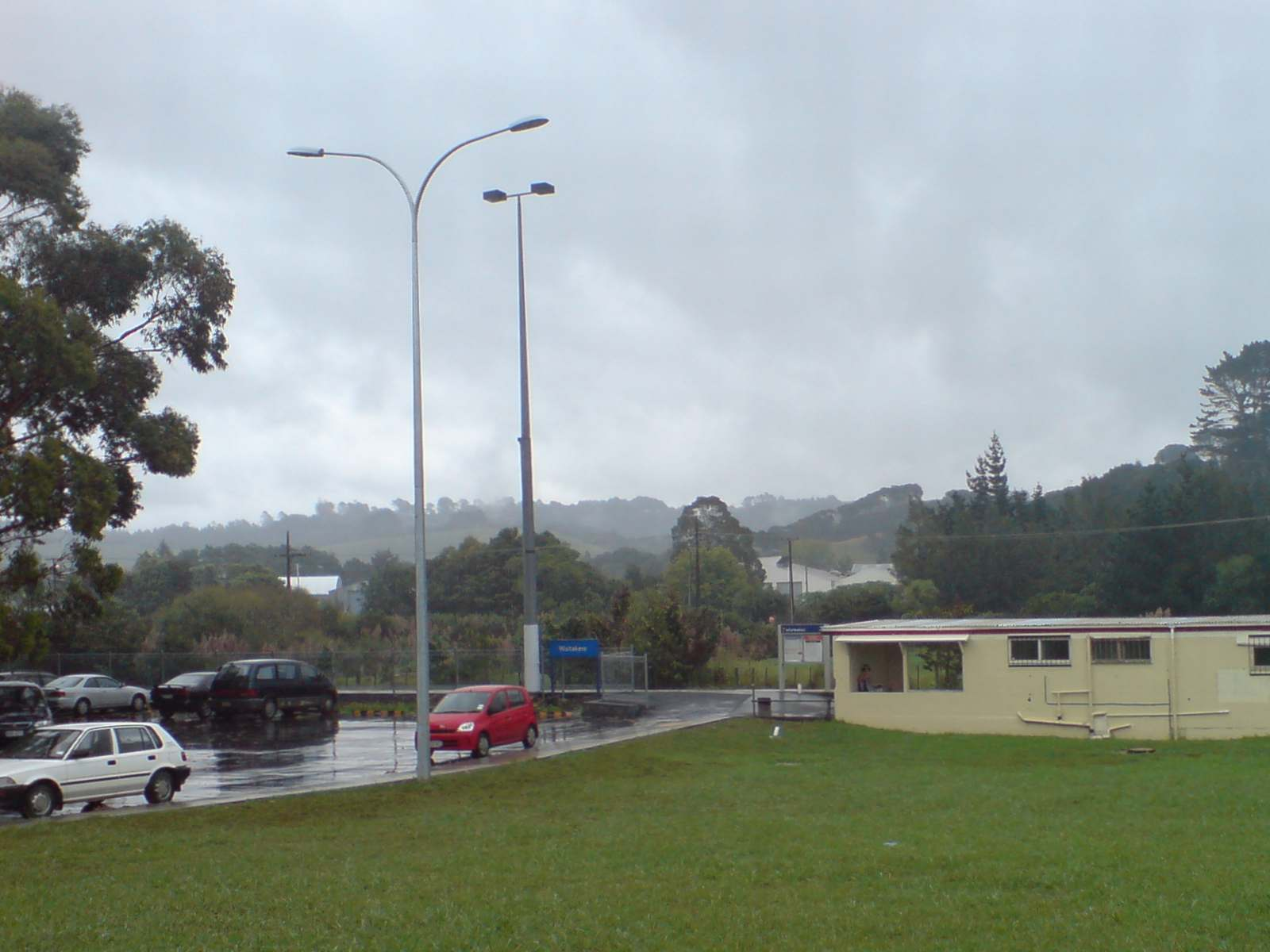
- The station and shelter

General information
- Location: Township Road, Waitākere, Auckland
- Coordinates: 36°50.9′S 174°32.6′E
- System: Auckland Transport urban rail
- Owner: KiwiRail (track and platform); Auckland Transport (buildings)
- Tracks: Mainline (1)

Construction
- Platform levels: 1
- Parking: Yes

Other information
- Station code: WKE

History
- Opened: 18 July 1881
- Closed: 20 July 2015
- Former names: Waitakerei

Passengers
- 2009: 227 passengers/day
Location

Waitākere railway station is a disused station on the North Auckland Line located in the village of Waitākere, to the north-west of Auckland, New Zealand. It served as the western terminus of the Western Line of the Auckland suburban network until 20 July 2015, when services were restricted to Swanson and Waitakere Station was closed.

It has a crossing loop, a turntable and a small station building, which is in a poor state of repair.

== History ==
The station opened on 18 July 1881, an original station on this section of the North Auckland Line, as Waitakerei, and changed to the current spelling in 1909. In 1972 the station building was replaced, the old building being relocated to MOTAT for preservation.

This station was a suburban terminus from the 1930s, despite low patronage. In 1980, after the daily service between Auckland and Helensville was withdrawn, it became the terminus for passenger trains and in railway terms the northernmost passenger station on the national rail network (geographically the former Auckland railway station was further north).

Off-peak Mondays to Fridays every second Western Line train from Britomart continued beyond Swanson to Waitakere until the station's closure in July 2015, when these services ceased with the electrification of the Western Line to Swanson. A bus shuttle service operates between Waitakere and Swanson for this non-electrified section.

=== Tramway ===
Between 1908 and 1925 a tramway operated to the west of the station as the kauri forests were felled. In 1908 Cashmore brothers sublet a contract to Short Bros (Bill and Owen) to fell timber near O’Neill's farm, haul it with bullocks over a skid road to the foot of the hill, up Te Henga Road on wooden rails to the top of the ridge (Steam Hauler Track) with a stationary engine, then by horse-drawn wagon down Bethells Road to Waitakere Station. Smyth's mill was alongside the Waitakere River at the junction of Te Henga and Bethells Roads. The Cashmore contract ended in 1912, after which Smyths took over until 1919, though they cut a block on Long Road until the early 1920s. In November 1919 Kauri Timber Company (KTC) sought tenders to extend the tramway, to send logs to their Freeman's Bay mill. They added 2 steam engines and extensions in the Waitakere Valley, linking to the Short/Smyth incline, and, at the other end, east to Waitakere Station. KTC had up to 600 men working 38,000 acres of Goldie's Bush/Waitakere, Wainamu Valley, Snows Bush and Mokoroa Stream. In the 1920s their driving dams sent logs to a lagoon (now Te Henga Wetland), where a steam launch towed them to the east end of the lake, near Brissenden Stream, then a tramway locomotive went on the north bank of the Waitakere River, crossed the river and continued a short way to the foot of the hill, where the steam hauler on Short Bros tram route, pulled the logs on their bogies, with a long wire rope, up the hill and along the ridge, close to the line of the present Steam Hauler Track. From the top, the hauler lowered the bogie by gravity down a valley south of Bethells Road to the foot of the hill (near the junction of Bethells and Wairere Roads), where the second engine towed the logs along what is now Bethells Road and over the Kumeu River to Waitakere Station. Parts of the tramway embankments remain in farmland in the valley. By the end of 1925 the locomotives were sold, tram rails lifted and the stationary engines moved to Great Barrier Island, after taking 31m super feet of KTC timber and 4m for David Goldie & Sons.

=== Closure ===
Waitākere Station closed in July 2015 as part of the Auckland railway electrification project. The Waitākere Tunnel between Waitākere and Swanson was too low for overhead electrification equipment to be installed, and the cost of enlarging the tunnel was deemed to be unjustifiable as Waitākere was one of the least used stations on the network. The station closed on 20 July 2015 when the rest of the Western Line switched to being operated by the new AM Class electric trains, and the former rail service was replaced with a bus service known as 147 serving Waitakere, Swanson, and beyond.

== See also ==
- List of Auckland railway stations
