= Leslie George Kelly =

Leslie George Kelly (10 May 1906 – 6 August 1959) was a New Zealand journalist, engine driver and historian. Kelly's father, Sidney Mellish Kelly, was descended from Edward Meurant, a trader and interpreter at Kawhia in the 1830s, and his wife, Kenehuru, the daughter of Ngāti Mahuta leader Te Tuhi-o-te-rangi. Leslie Kelly was born in Auckland on 10 May 1906. He married Heera (Sarah) Te Moengaroa Ueke, who was of Ngāi Tawake, a hapū (subtribe) of Ngāpuhi, and Ngāti Mahuta, on 11 February 1929, in Auckland. From the late 1920s, he studied Māori history and wrote articles for the Journal of the Polynesian Society, later writing two books. He died in a train crash at Motumaoho, Morrinsville, on 6 August 1959.

== Bibliography ==
- Marion Dufresne at the Bay of Islands. Wellington: Reed, 1951.
- Tainui: the story of Hoturoa and his descendants. Wellington: Polynesian Society, 1949.
