= Orini =

- Locality
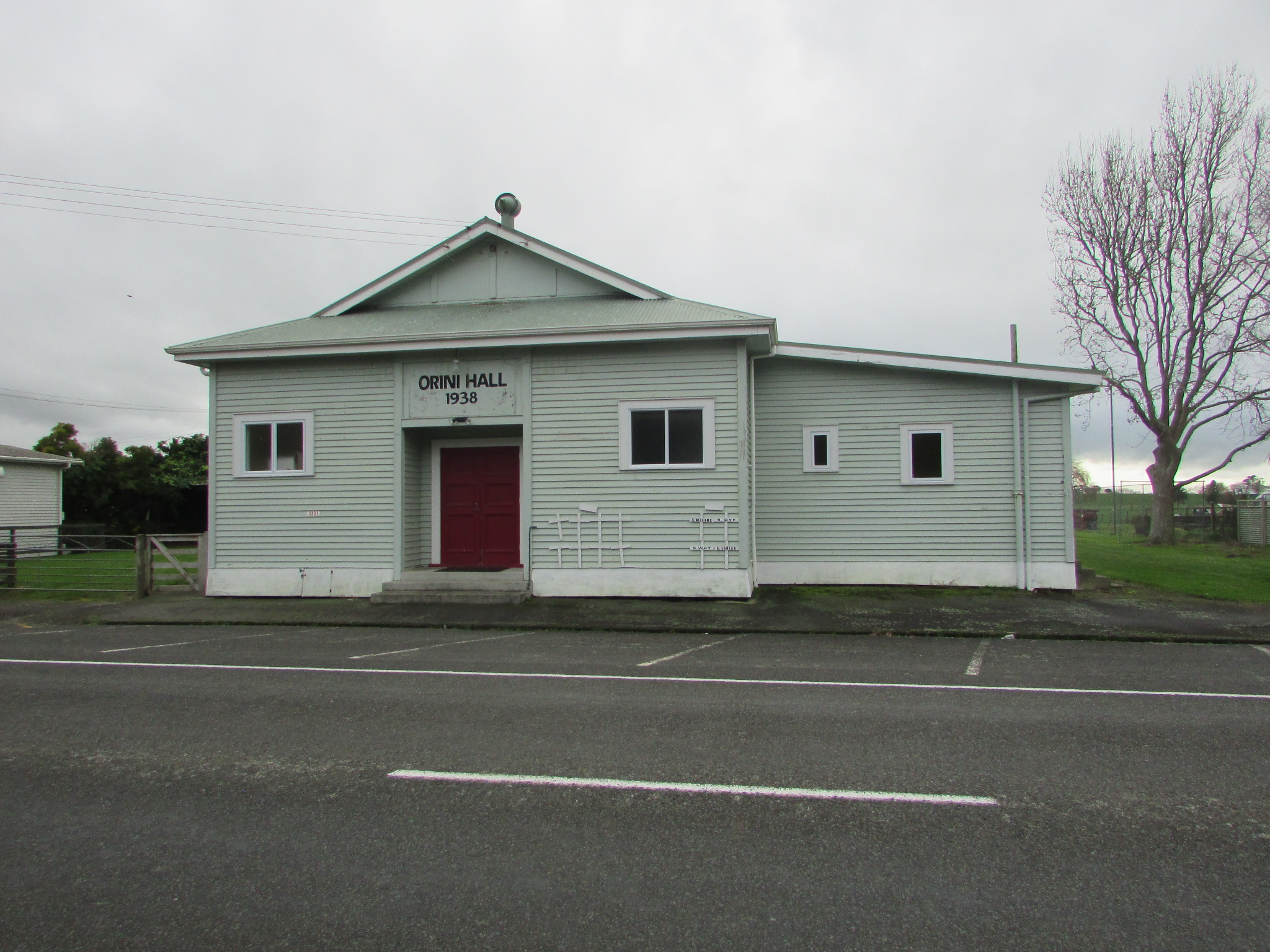
- Orini Hall
- Interactive map of Orini
- Coordinates: 37°33′20″S 175°18′30″E
- Country: New Zealand
- Region: Waikato
- District: Waikato District
- Wards: Waerenga-Whitikahu General Ward; Tai Runga Takiwaa Maaori Ward
- Electorates: Waikato; Hauraki-Waikato (Māori)

Government
  - Territorial Authority: Waikato District Council
  - Regional council: Waikato Regional Council
  - Mayor of Waikato: Aksel Bech
  - Waikato MP: Tim van de Molen
  - Hauraki-Waikato MP: Hana-Rawhiti Maipi-Clarke

Area
  - Total: 31.06 km^{2} (11.99 sq mi)

Population (2023 Census)
  - Total: 315
  - Density: 10.1/km^{2} (26.3/sq mi)
- Time zone: UTC+12 (NZST)
  - Summer (DST): UTC+13 (NZDT)
- Postcode: 3792
- Area code: 07

Orini is a rural village in the Waikato District in the North Island of New Zealand. It is located east of Taupiri

Orini is centred around a community hall which was opened in 1913, and was rebuilt in 1937 following a fire. It also has a school, which had 81 pupils in 1939.

A post office opened in 1907. A creamery was running in 1911. A cheese factory opened in 1915, and was still operating in 1932. The stream bridge between Orini and Whitikahu was built in 1938. By 1950 the Orini telephone exchange had 123 subscribers.

The Mangawara area to the west was a Kauri gum digging area until 1983. It also had a creamery and a post office by 1910.

Te Hoe, to the north, had a school between 1912 and 1995. It had a post office and store and still has a hall, which was built in 1957.

== History ==
From the 1600s: Ngati Koura and Ngati Wairere Waikai occupied the area, mainly for eel fishing. An old waka was discovered in 1937.

After the invasion of the Waikato, the area was confiscated in 1863 and cut up into lots for the military settlers, though deemed too swampy for occupation.

Flax was milled in the area from 1890 until a 1908 fire and again from 1918. A new Orini mill opened in 1936 and flax was still being grown in 1938, when there was another fire. The drained peat has also caught fire from time to time.

Electricity came in 1928. A hall was built and a bus service to Hamilton, started in 1937 and was still running in 1964 and into the 1970s.

During the 1960s and 1970s, Orini was the site of the Beeville community, a self-sufficient agricultural colony founded by Raymond and Dan Hanson.

== Demographics ==
Orini locality covers 31.06 km^{2} (11.99 sq mi). It is part of the larger Whitikahu statistical area.

Historical population
| Year | Pop. | ±% p.a. |
|---|---|---|
| 2006 | 264 | — |
| 2013 | 300 | +1.84% |
| 2018 | 294 | −0.40% |
| 2023 | 315 | +1.39% |

Orini had a population of 315 in the 2023 New Zealand census, an increase of 21 people (7.1%) since the 2018 census, and an increase of 15 people (5.0%) since the 2013 census. There were 162 males and 150 females in 90 dwellings. 1.0% of people identified as LGBTIQ+. There were 84 people (26.7%) aged under 15 years, 60 (19.0%) aged 15 to 29, 138 (43.8%) aged 30 to 64, and 36 (11.4%) aged 65 or older.

People could identify as more than one ethnicity. The results were 88.6% European (Pākehā); 14.3% Māori; 1.9% Pasifika; 4.8% Asian; and 1.9% Middle Eastern, Latin American and African New Zealanders (MELAA). English was spoken by 97.1%, Māori language by 1.0%, and other languages by 5.7%. No language could be spoken by 1.9% (e.g. too young to talk). New Zealand Sign Language was known by 1.9%. The percentage of people born overseas was 12.4, compared with 28.8% nationally.

Religious affiliations were 25.7% Christian, 1.9% Islam, 1.0% Māori religious beliefs, 1.0% Buddhist, and 1.9% other religions. People who answered that they had no religion were 64.8%, and 2.9% of people did not answer the census question.

Of those at least 15 years old, 45 (19.5%) people had a bachelor's or higher degree, 138 (59.7%) had a post-high school certificate or diploma, and 57 (24.7%) people exclusively held high school qualifications. 36 people (15.6%) earned over $100,000 compared to 12.1% nationally. The employment status of those at least 15 was that 135 (58.4%) people were employed full-time, 33 (14.3%) were part-time, and 3 (1.3%) were unemployed.

== Education ==
Orini had a school by 1912. It was replaced with Orini Combined School, formed from a merger of Orini, Te Hoe, Netherby and Mangawara schools.

It is now a co-educational state primary school, with a roll of 90 as of July 2026.
