= New Zealand Loan and Mercantile Agency Company =

New Zealand stock and station agency

- Industry: Mercantile
- Founded: 1865
- Defunct: 1961
- Successor: Dalgety & New Zealand Loan Ltd.
- Headquarters: 1 Queen Victoria Street, London (Bank of New Zealand building)
- Products: Agricultural and pastoral trade and commerce, rural investments

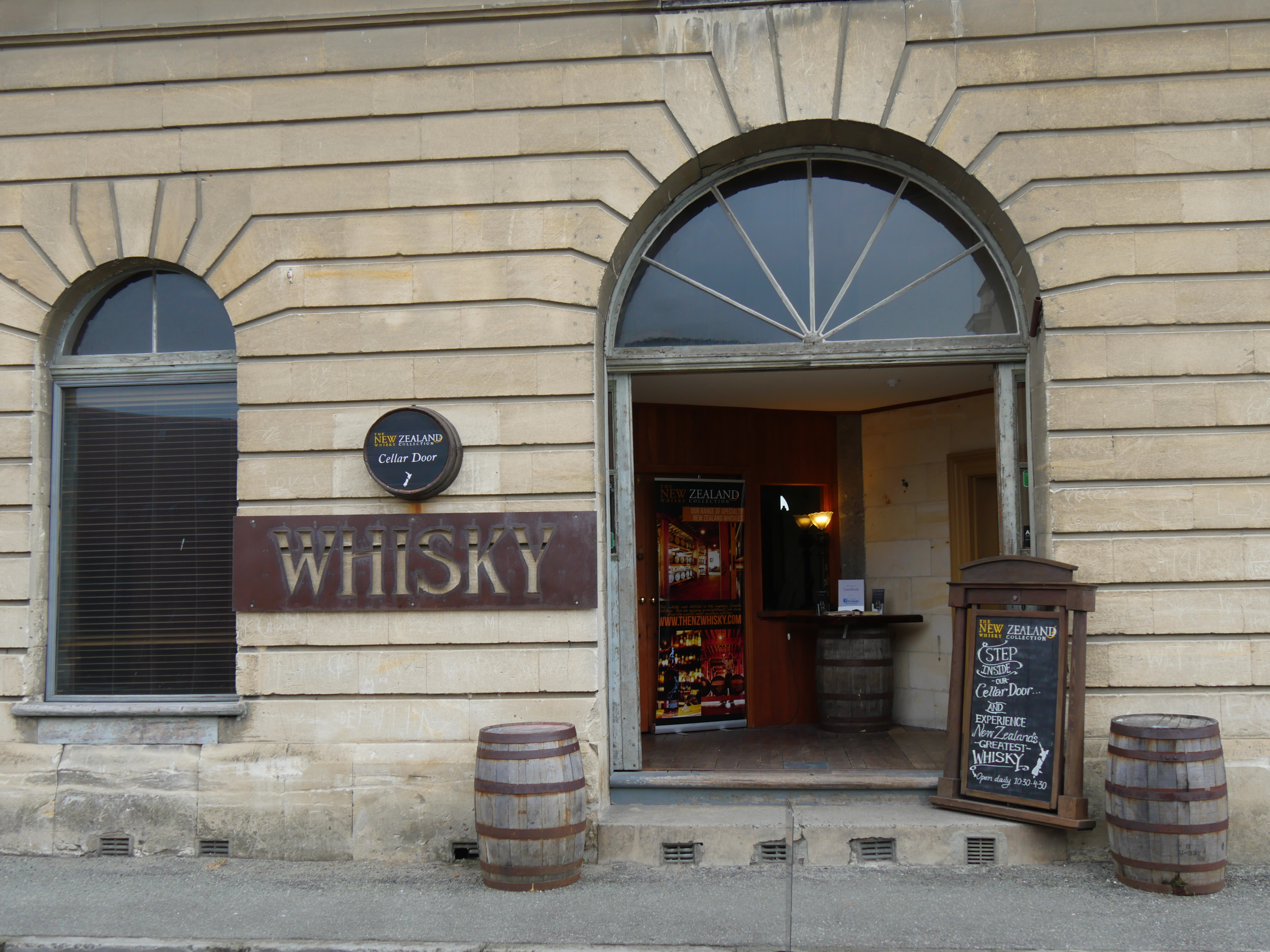
Grain store Oamaru 1882

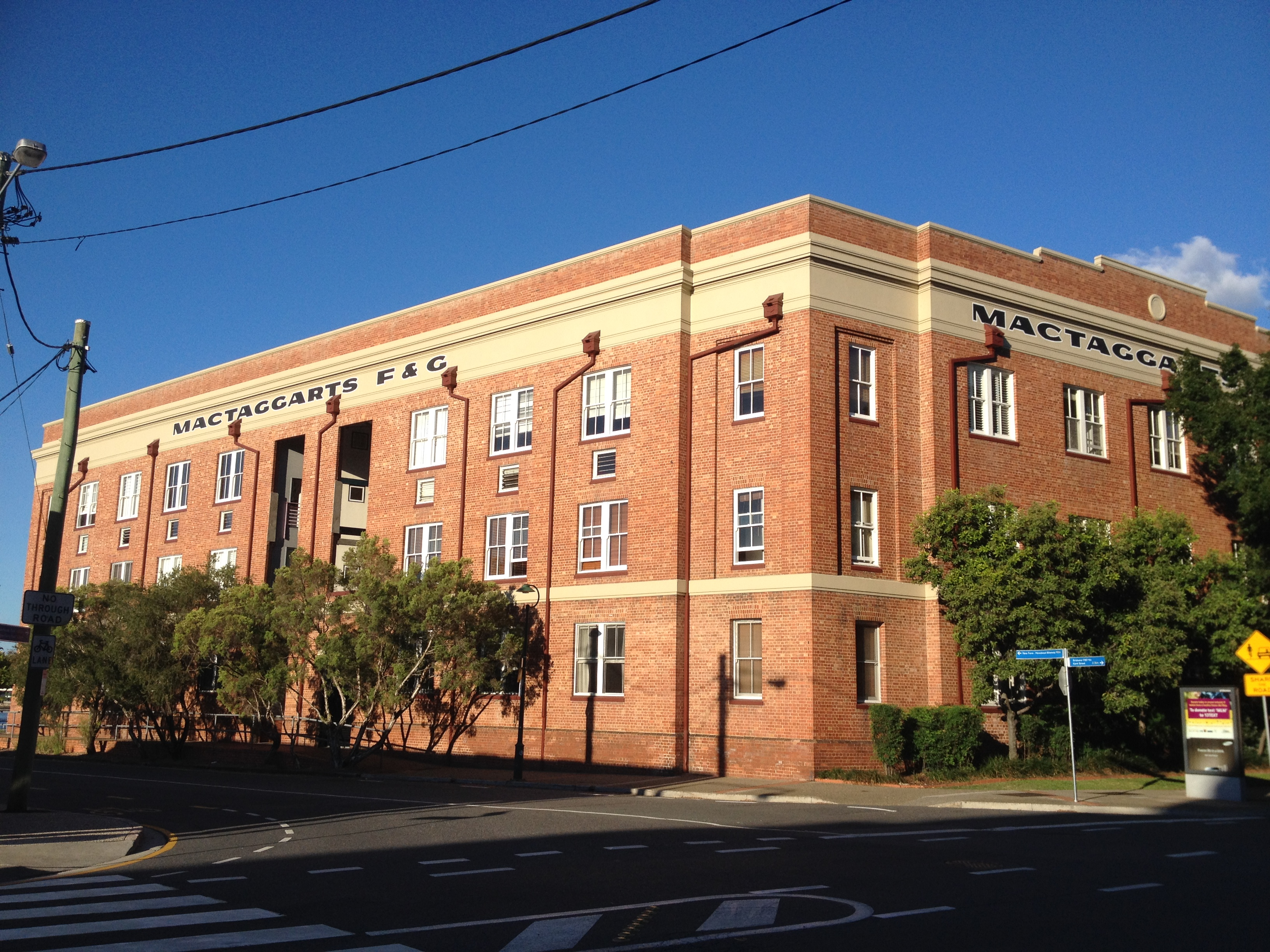
Loan & Mercantile wool store, Mactaggarts Place, Brisbane, Queensland 1926

The New Zealand Loan and Mercantile Agency Company provided investments and loans for trade and commerce in New Zealand and Australia.

== Notable people ==
- James Beard, the 1889 New Zealand Loan and Mercantile Building architect
- John Logan Campbell, director
- Josiah Firth, with Thomas Russell embarked on a series of large banking and company promotions
- Henry Goulstone, colonial accountant
- Thomas Henderson, helped establish the company
- Thomas Russell, company founder and Minister of Colonial Defence
- James Williamson, company founder and director

== Location of former offices ==
England

- 1, Queen Victoria Street, Mansion House, London

Australia

- Eagle Street, Brisbane, Queensland
- Rockhampton, Queensland
- 538 Collins Street (1883) and King Street(1909), Melbourne, Victoria

New Zealand

- Corner of Fryatt and Thomas Burns Streets, Dunedin
- Durham Street, Sydenham, Christchurch

== Timeline ==
- 1865 – Incorporated in England.
- 1874 – Started business in some Australia States
- 1881 – Net Profit £6154
- 1889 – The Australian business formed their own board. Offices in Melbourne, Sydney, Brisbane and Rockhampton
- 1893–95: The Bank of New Zealand, the Colonial Bank of New Zealand and New Zealand Loan and Mercantile Agency Company were involved with a financial crisis causing a national slowdown in private investment.
- 1894 – Company reconstructed.
- 1952 – Became NZL Properties (Australia) Pty Ltd
- 1961 – Merged with Dalgety & New Zealand Loan Ltd

Dalgety went on to be replaced by the contemporary PGG Wrightson

== Gallery ==
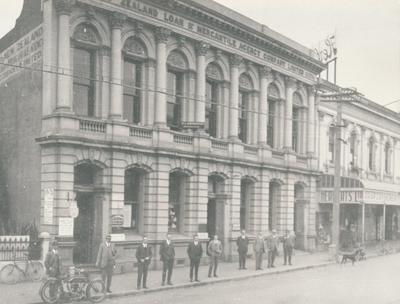
Office in Timaru, Canterbury, 1926

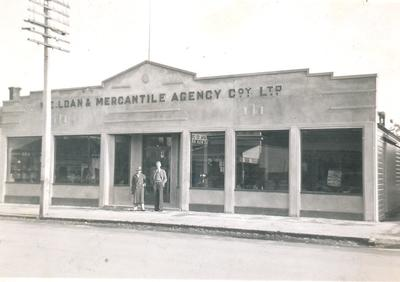
Premises in Milton, Otago, 1940

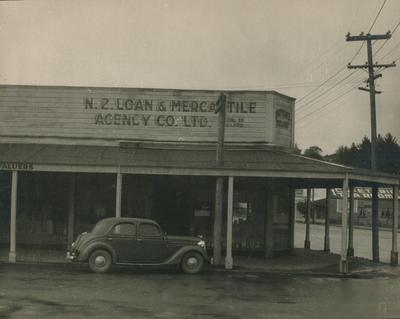
Premise in Hunterville, Rangitikei district, c.1930

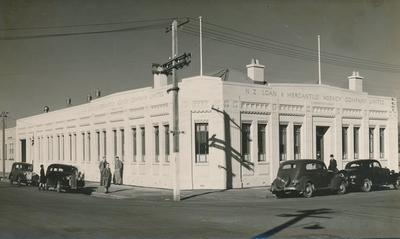
Premise in Hastings, Hawke's Bay (after earthquake), 1931

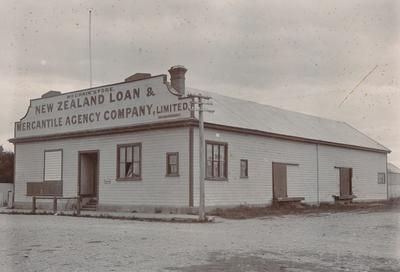
Grain store, Rakaia, Canterbury, 1920
