= List of moths of Australia (Coleophoridae) =

Partial list of Australian moths

This is a list of the Australian species of the family Coleophoridae. It also acts as an index to the species articles and forms part of the full List of moths of Australia.

- Coleophora albiradiata Baldizzone, 1996
- Coleophora alcyonipennella (Kollar, 1832)
- Coleophora consumpta Baldizzone, 1996
- Coleophora crypsineura (Lower, 1900)
- Coleophora horakae Baldizzone, 1996
- Coleophora frustrata Baldizzone, 1996
- Coleophora fuscosquamata Baldizzone, 1996
- Coleophora leucocephala Baldizzone, 1996
- Coleophora nielseni Baldizzone, 1996
- Coleophora rustica Baldizzone, 1996
- Coleophora seminalis Meyrick, 1921
- Coleophora serinipennella Christoph, 1872
- Coleophora tremefacta Meyrick, 1921
- Corythangela fimbriata Baldizzone, 1996
- Corythangela galeata Meyrick, 1897
