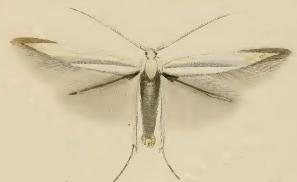

Scientific classification
- Kingdom: Animalia
- Phylum: Arthropoda
- Clade: Pancrustacea
- Class: Insecta
- Order: Lepidoptera
- Family: Coleophoridae
- Genus: Coleophora
- Species: C. ibipennella

Binomial name
- Coleophora ibipennella Zeller, 1849

Synonyms
- List: Coleophora nemorum Heinemann, 1854; Coleophora ardeaepennella Scott, 1861; Coleophora alba Toll, 1952; Coleophora peralba Toll, 1953; Coleophora quercivorella Capuse, 1971

= Coleophora ibipennella =

Species of moth

Coleophora ibipennella is a moth of the case-bearer family (Coleophoridae). It was first described by Philipp Christoph Zeller in 1849 and is found in Asia, Europe and North Africa. The larva feed within a pistol case on oak leaves (Quercus species) and in the past was confused with Coleophora betulella, whose larva feed from a similar looking pistol case on birch leaves (Betula species).

== Taxonomy ==
The moth was first described in 1849 by Phillpp Zeller from a specimen found on oak at Frankfurt on Main, Germany. Four years later the species was mentioned by Henry Stainton as a moth to look for in Britain. Shortly afterwards he found a larval pistol case on birch and called it, firstly C. ibipennella Heyden, and later C. ibipennella Zeller. Stainton believed they were the same species (i.e. conspecific) as Zeller's oak-feeding moth. In 1861 John Scott realised they were separate species and re-named the oak-feeding moth C. ardeaepennella. This left the birch-feeding specimen as C. ibipennella. Maximilian Wocke introduced the name C. betulella, in 1877 for the birch-feeding species. English authors continued to use the name C. ibipennella, but as C. ibipennella Stainton to distinguish it from C. ibipennella Zeller. Following protests by entomologists, Edward Meyrick in 1928 and Kloet and Hincks in 1945, they correctly referred to the birch-feeding species as C. betulella. Unfortunately incorrect British nomenclature continued to be followed by Ian Heslop and Kloet and Hincks in 1961 and 1972 respectively and by subsequent recorders.

== Distribution ==
Owing to the problems of identifying this species and Coleophora betulella, there has been some confusion over the distribution of this species in the past. It is found in Europe from central Scandinavia southwards, as well as in North Africa and in the Near East to Lebanon.

== Diet ==
The larvae feed on oaks (Quercus species).

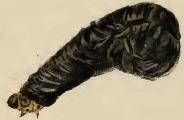
Larval case

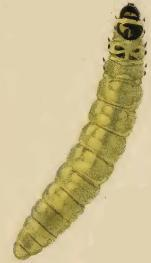
Larva

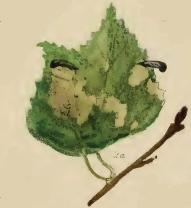
Birch leaves eaten by the larvae, with two cases attached
