= Chedra mimica =

Scientific classification
- Kingdom: Animalia
- Phylum: Arthropoda
- Clade: Pancrustacea
- Class: Insecta
- Order: Lepidoptera
- Family: Batrachedridae
- Genus: Chedra
- Species: C. mimica

Binomial name
- Chedra mimica Zimmerman, 1978

Moth species in family Batrachedridae

Chedra mimica is a tiny moth of the family Batrachedridae known from Hawaii.

== Taxonomy ==
It was first collected by Robert Cyril Layton Perkins in the Waianae Mountains of Oahu together with Chedra microstigma in the beginning of the 20th century. These Lord Walsingham used, both species mixed together, to construct a type series which he used to describe the new Batrachedra microstigma in 1907.

In 1978 Elwood Zimmerman noticed this type series contained two species. He re-described Batrachedra microstigma and placed it the genus Chedra, and described C. mimica based on some of Lord Walsingham's specimens as well as new specimens from Kona District, Hawaii. The holotype was collected in Kona above 2,000 feet (610 m) in altitude.

Zimmerman moved the entire Chedra genus, including this species, to the Momphinae subfamily of the family Gelechiidae in 1978. Ron Hodges classified Chedra in the subfamily Batrachedrinae of the family Coleophoridae in his 1983 Check List of the Lepidoptera of America North of Mexico, but in 1999 he placed in the subfamily Batrachedrinae of the family Batrachedridae.

== Description ==
The wingspan is 6.5–12 mm. It is mostly straw-coloured, but flecked or marked with brown and fuscous.

== Distribution ==
It was described from the Hawaiian islands of Oahu and Hawaii. Zimmerman opines it may be an introduced species. This is due to remarks by Swezey when he collected the types for the taxon Batrachedra cuniculator near Honolulu. According to him it was odd that he had not noticed the species at an earlier date, despite having lived in Hawaii for a few years.

When Zimmerman moved that taxon to his reclassified Chedra microstigma, he further remarked that besides the two species he had classified as Chedra, the genus Chedra was at that point only known from the New World, which meant the presence of the genus on Hawaii could be considered a biogeographic oddity. At present, however, a new species has been discovered in the Philippines, C. fimbristyli, which is certainly native to those islands. Zimmerman further theorised that the mode of invasion may have been the U.S. Army, which posted a large number of horses and mules on Oahu after the USA usurped the native government in 1893, and imported a large amount of hay and silage from the West Coast of North America as provender for this stock, in which stalks the caterpillars may have hitched a ride. Note, however, that this was only around a decade before Lord Walsingham collected his type series in the island interior.

== Ecology ==
The larvae feed on Eragrostis species. They bore in the stems and flower heads of their host plant.
