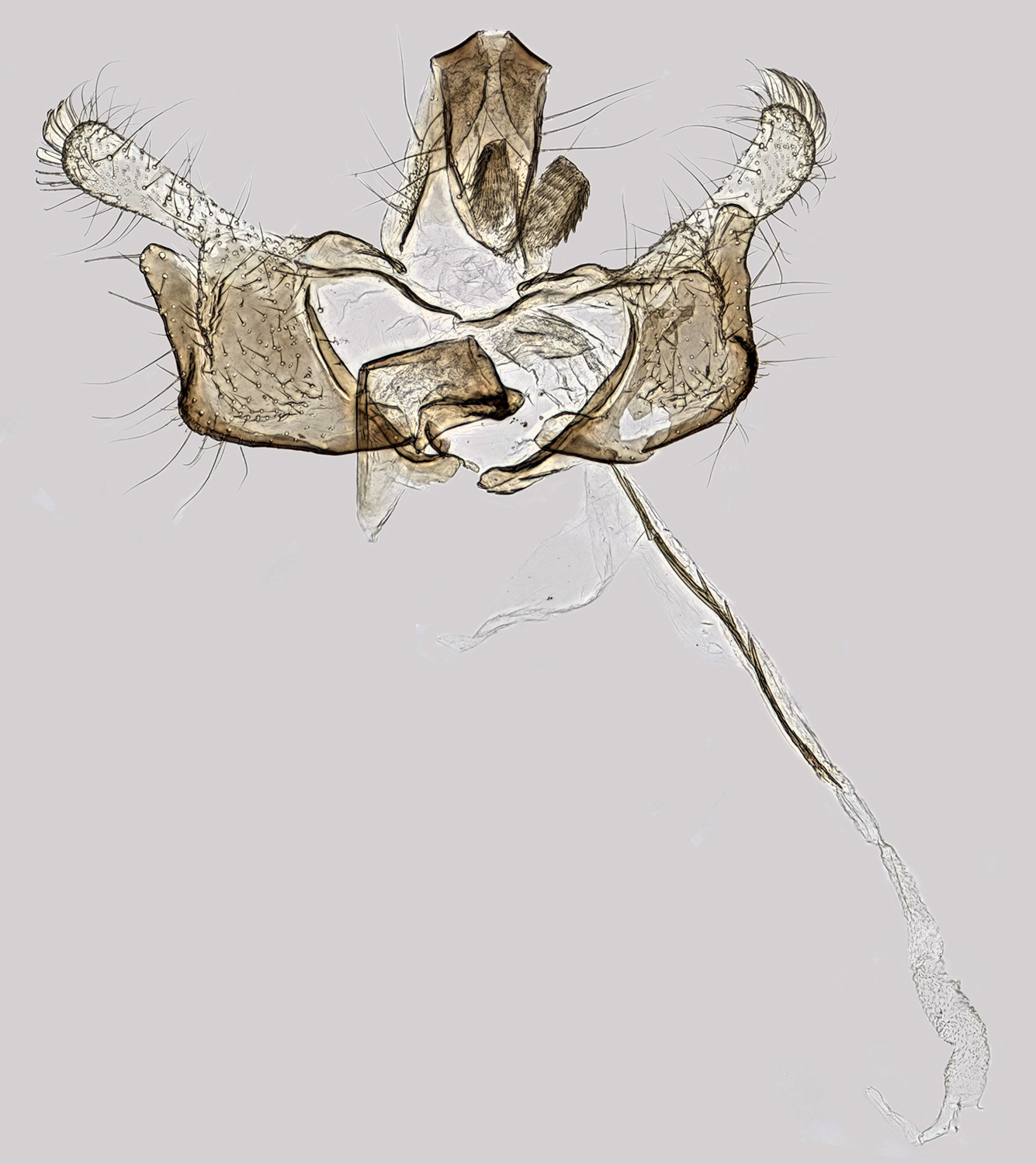
- Genitalia preparation

Scientific classification
- Kingdom: Animalia
- Phylum: Arthropoda
- Clade: Pancrustacea
- Class: Insecta
- Order: Lepidoptera
- Family: Coleophoridae
- Genus: Coleophora
- Species: C. betulella

Binomial name
- Coleophora betulella Heinemann & Wocke, 1876 ("1877")

Synonyms
- Coleophora buettneri Rössler, 1876; Coleophora ibipennella Stainton, 1859 (non Zeller, 1849: preoccupied)

= Coleophora betulella =

Species of moth

Coleophora betulella is a moth of the family Coleophoridae. It is found in all of Europe, except the Balkan Peninsula.

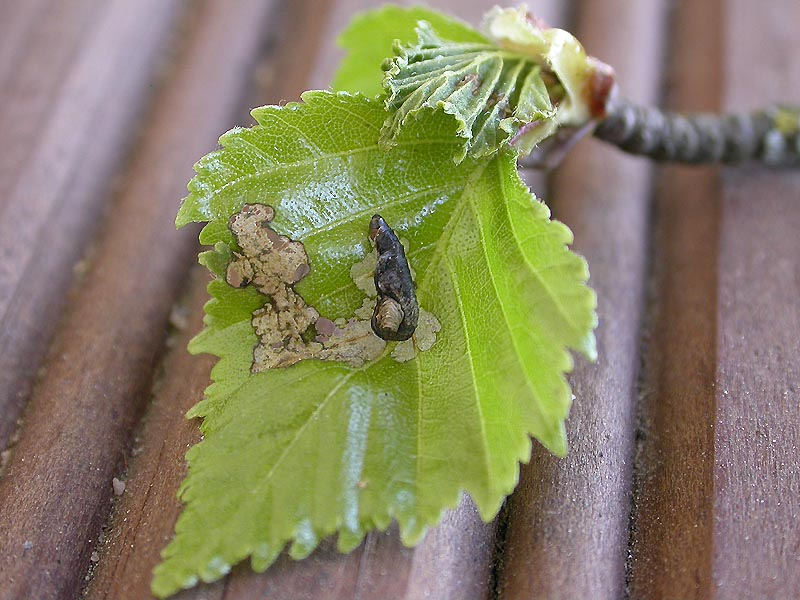

== Description ==
The wingspan is 10–15 mm. The moth's head is white, as are the antennae which are ringed with pale brownish. It has a basal joint with rather short tuft. The labial palps and forewings are also white. The veins are faintly yellowish-tinged, near apex more fuscous; costal edge anteriorly finely dark fuscous, near apex more strongly; costal cilia fuscous or dark fuscous except at base and tips. Hindwings rather dark grey. Keys and description Only reliably identified by dissection and microscopic examination of the genitalia.

Adults are on wing from June to July.
