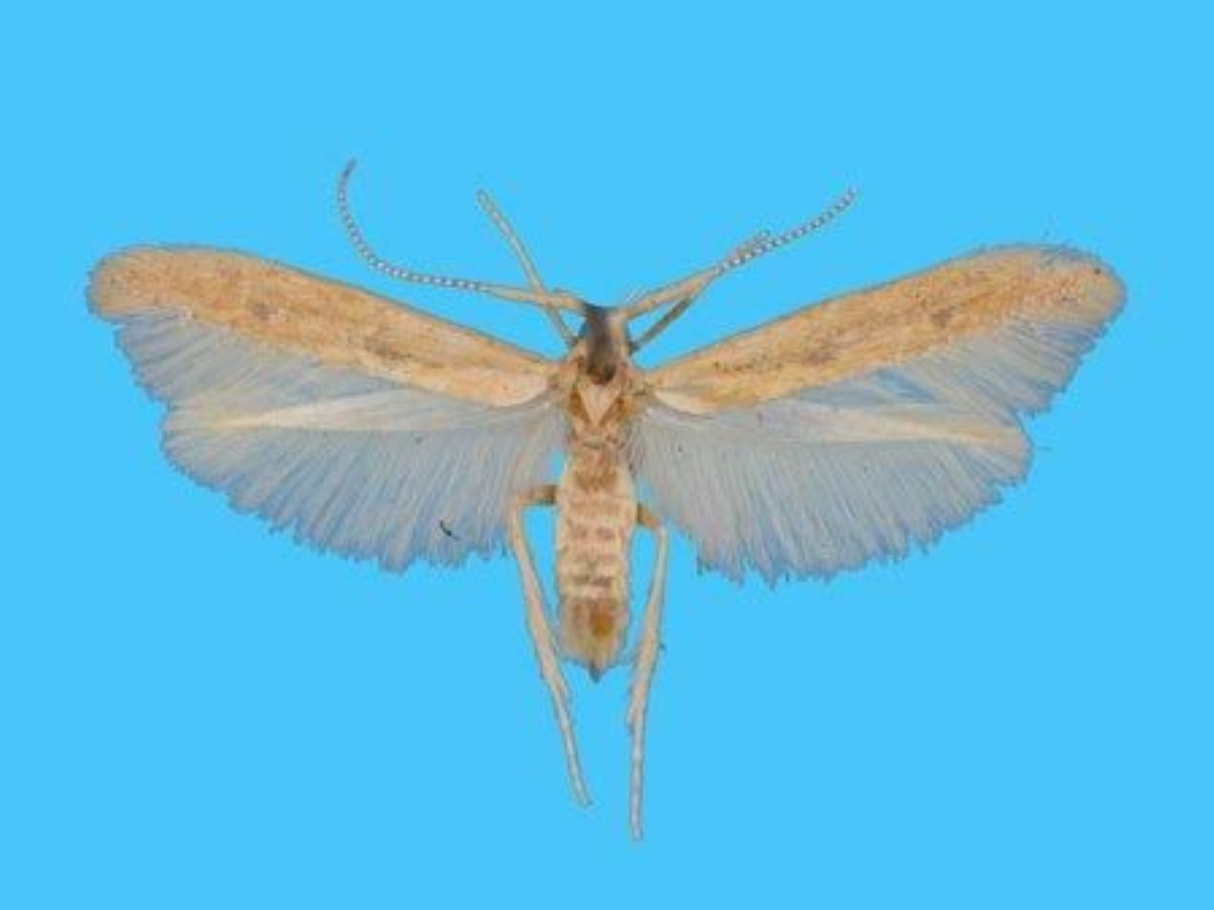

Scientific classification
- Kingdom: Animalia
- Phylum: Arthropoda
- Clade: Pancrustacea
- Class: Insecta
- Order: Lepidoptera
- Family: Coleophoridae
- Genus: Coleophora
- Species: C. salicorniae

Binomial name
- Coleophora salicorniae Heinemann & Wocke, 1877

Synonyms
- Coleophora cypriacella Rebel, 1928

= Coleophora salicorniae =

Species of moth

Coleophora salicorniae is a moth of the family Coleophoridae. It is found in most of Europe, including the Mediterranean islands and Cyprus. It is also known from central Asia, Iran and the Canary Islands. It occurs in desert biotopes and saltmarshes.

The wingspan is 12–14 mm. Coleophora species have narrow blunt to pointed forewings and a weakly defined tornus. The hindwings are narrow-elongate and very long-fringed. The upper surfaces have neither a discal spot nor transverse lines. Each abdomen segment of the abdomen has paired patches of tiny spines which show through the scales. The resting position is horizontal with the front end raised and the cilia give the hind tip a frayed and upturned look if the wings are rolled around the body. C. salicorniae characteristics include head ochreous. Antennae white, ringed with dark fuscous, basally thickened with ochreous scales in male to ½. Forewings ochreous with scattered blackish scales plical and second discal stigmata grey or fuscous. Hindwings pale grey.

Adults are on wing in late July or August. External image
