= Chedra microstigma =

Scientific classification
- Kingdom: Animalia
- Phylum: Arthropoda
- Clade: Pancrustacea
- Class: Insecta
- Order: Lepidoptera
- Family: Batrachedridae
- Genus: Chedra
- Species: C. microstigma

Binomial name
- Chedra microstigma (Walsingham, 1907)

Synonyms
- Batrachedra microstigma Walsingham, 1907; Batrachedra cuniculator Busck, 1914; Batrachedra foliocuniculator (misspelling by Swezey, 1954)

Moth species in family Batrachedridae

Chedra microstigma is a tiny moth of the family Batrachedridae described in 1907. It has only been found on Oahu. It has been found feeding on sedges, plants belonging to the family Cyperaceae, and its larvae host at least three species of parasitoids in Hawaii.

== Taxonomy ==
It was first described by Lord Walsingham in 1907 as Batrachedra microstigma from specimens collected at 2,000 feet (610 m) in altitude in the Waianae Mountains of Oahu by Robert Cyril Layton Perkins, and moved to the genus Chedra by Elwood Zimmerman in 1978. Upon closer examination of the original type series, Zimmerman determined that Walsingham had in fact collected two species, and described the new species Chedra mimica from some of those same specimens. Otto Herman Swezey collected larvae at a coastal marshland near the city of Honolulu known as 'Kewalo', now long lost to development, which he then reared to adult moths. These August Busck then described as Batrachedra cuniculator, which Zimmerman synonymised in 1978.

Zimmerman re-designated a holotype from amongst the original type series. The type for Batrachedra cuniculator is kept at National Museum of Natural History of the Smithsonian Institution.

Zimmerman moved the entire Chedra genus, including this species, to the Momphinae subfamily of the family Gelechiidae in 1978. Ron Hodges classified Chedra in the subfamily Batrachedrinae of the family Coleophoridae in his 1983 Check List of the Lepidoptera of America North of Mexico, but in 1999 he placed in the subfamily Batrachedrinae of the family Batrachedridae.

== Distribution ==
It was described from Oahu, but is seen as possibly an introduced species. This is due to remarks by Swezey when he collected the types for the taxon Batrachedra cuniculator near Honolulu. According to him it was odd that he had not noticed the species at an earlier date, despite having lived in Hawaii for a few years.

When Zimmerman moved that taxon to his reclassified Chedra microstigma, he further remarked that besides the two Chedra species he had just classified as such, the genus Chedra was at that point only known from the New World, which meant the presence of the genus on Hawaii could be considered a biogeographic oddity. At present, however, a new species has been discovered in the Philippines, C. fimbristyli, which is certainly native to those islands. Zimmerman further theorised that the mode of invasion may have been the U.S. Army, which posted a large number of horses and mules on Oahu after the USA usurped the native government in 1893, and imported a large amount of hay and silage from the West Coast of North America as provender for this stock, in which stalks the caterpillars may have hitched a ride. Note, however, that this was only around a decade before Lord Walsingham collected his type series in the island interior.

== Ecology ==
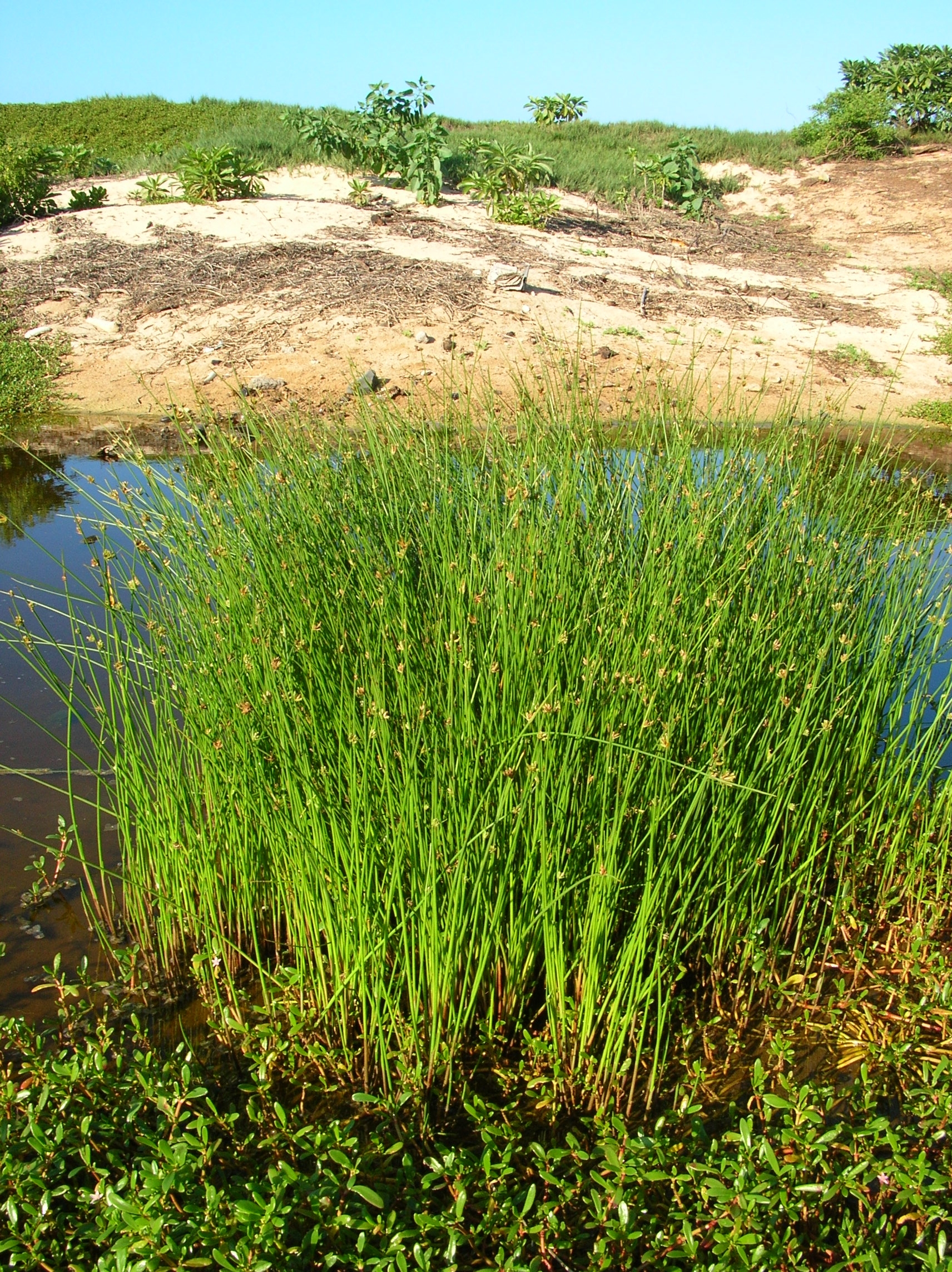
A presumable habitat for the moth is this stand of Cyperus laevigatus, known locally as makaloa, growing in a coastal marsh in Hawaii.

Swezey collected the larvae feeding on Cyperus laevigatus and Scirpus maritimus. They mine the leaves and bore the stems of their host plants.

Zimmerman reported finding the parasitoids Bracon swezeyi, Chelonus blackburni and Trathala flavo-orbitalis infesting this moth species in Hawaii.
