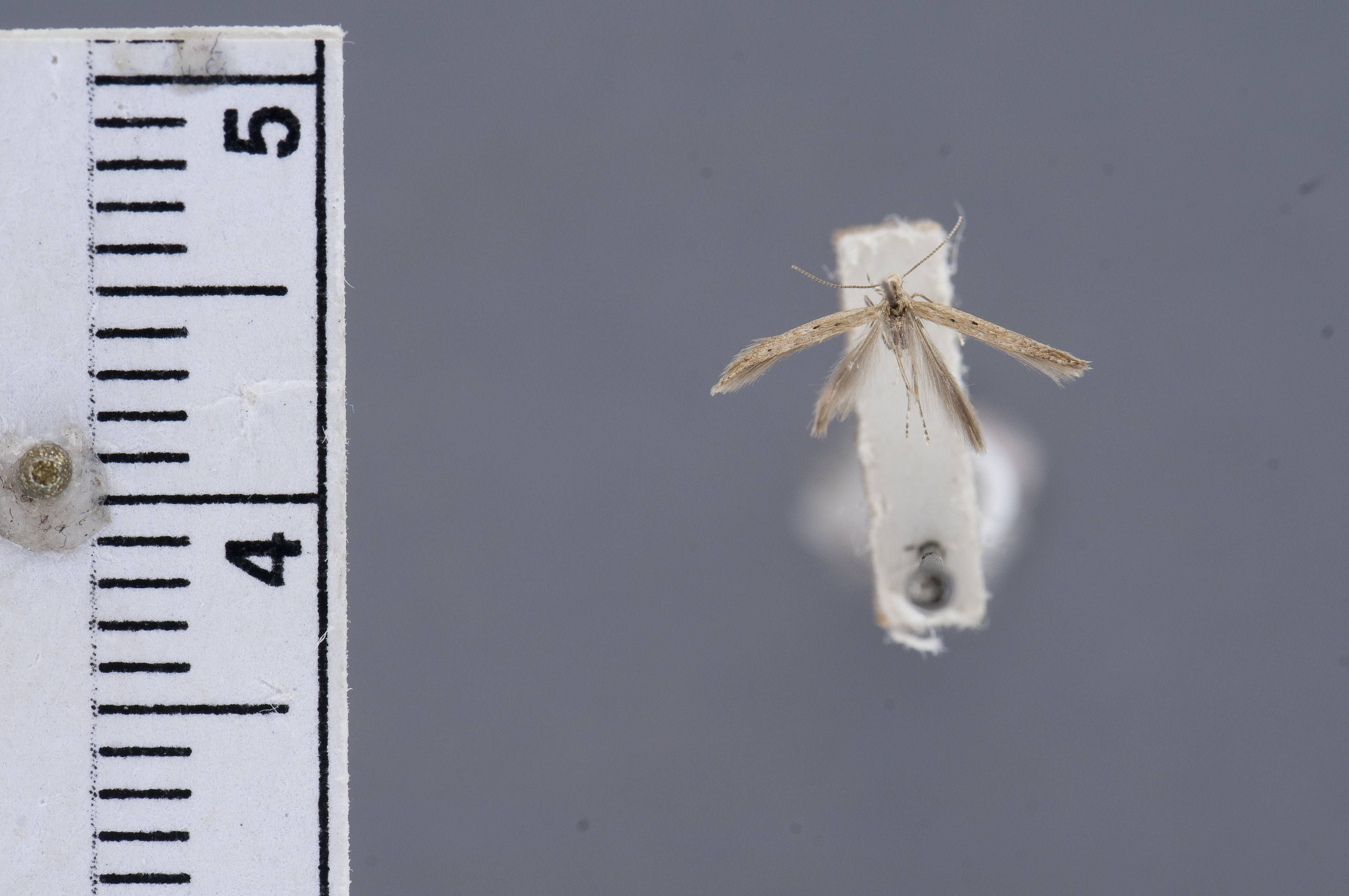
- holotype of Chedra delector from Chile

Scientific classification
- Kingdom: Animalia
- Phylum: Arthropoda
- Clade: Pancrustacea
- Class: Insecta
- Order: Lepidoptera
- Family: Batrachedridae
- Genus: Chedra; Hodges, 1966

= Chedra =

Genus of moths

Chedra is a genus of tiny moths, belonging to the family Batrachedridae.

== Taxonomy ==
Ron Hodges created the genus in 1966 to accommodate three new species: two from North America and one from Chile. These he found very similar to the genus Batrachedra, but distinct on the basis of the adult males possessing a "single, strong, apical spine on the ampulla" (also known as the harpe), the females he distinguished from those of Batrachedra by the "presence of long apophyses" and the "absence of a signum and accessory pouches, and the corpus bursae being poorly set off from the ductus bursae". At the time Hodges initially classified the genus in the family Gelechioidea. Hodges designated as type species Chedra pensor.

Elwood Zimmerman included it in his subfamily Momphinae of the family Gelechiidae in his 1978 treatment of the microlepidoptera of Hawaii. He expanded the genus be adding two more species, the first by moving a species from Batrachedra to Chedra, the second upon discovery of a new species among the already collected specimens of the first species after closer examination of the type series.

Hodges included the genus in the family Batrachedridae in the 1978 The moths of America north of Mexico, he included it in subfamily Batrachedrinae of the family Coleophoridae in his 1983 Check List of the Lepidoptera of America North of Mexico, but in 1999 he re-classified the genus in his newly re-described subfamily Batrachedrinae, with the same name as earlier, but now within the family Batrachedridae.

The Global Lepidoptera Names Index of the Natural History Museum classifies the genus in the family Coleophoridae, although references are not provided to substantiate this placement.

=== Etymology ===
The etymology of the name for the genus Batrachedra is from two words, 'bactrach' is derived from batrachos, a frog, and edra, a seat (which refers to the particular resting position of the imagoes). Hodges created the name Chedra as a derivative of that, but it means nothing, and is thus a "nonsense name" in the sense of Edward Meyrick.

== Species ==
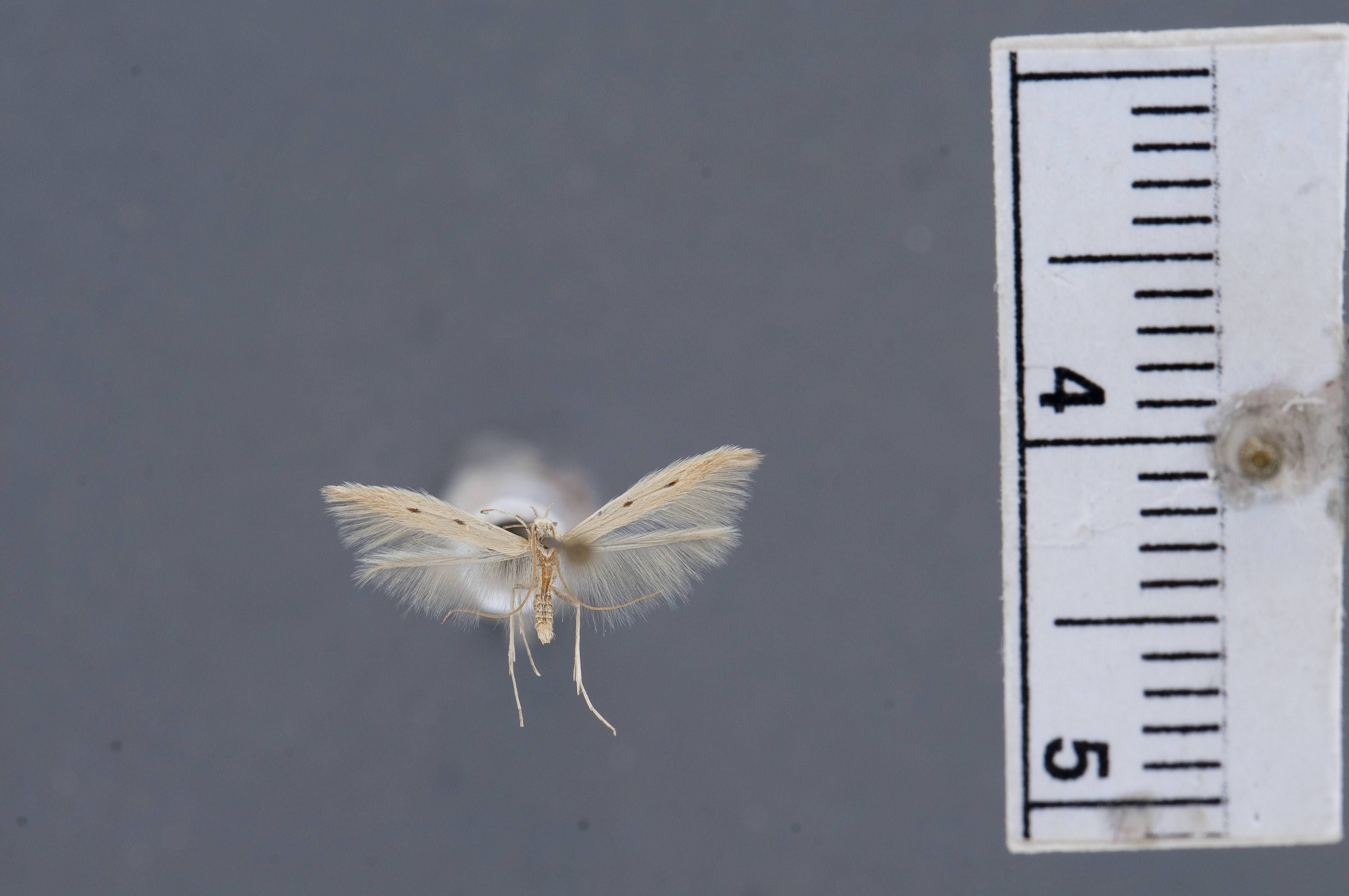
holotype of Chedra pensor from Arizona.

It is unclear how many species exist of this genus, but the following have been named:

- Chedra delector Hodges, 1966 - Chile
- Chedra fimbristyli Mey, 1993 - The Philippines
- Chedra inquisitor Hodges, 1966 - Eastern North America (type specimens were collected in central Illinois)
- Chedra microstigma (Walsingham, 1907) - Hawaii
- Chedra mimica Zimmerman, 1978 - Hawaii
- Chedra pensor Hodges, 1966 - Arizona, specimens have also recently been collected in Illinois

== Ecology ==
In Chedra delector the caterpillars feed upon the seeds of Cyperaceae, those of C. fimbristyli mine within the leaves of a species of Fimbristylis in the family Cyperaceae, and those of C. microstigma have been found mining in the leaves of Cyperus laevigatus and Scirpus maritimus, also plants of the family Cyperaceae.

== Uses ==
Chedra fimbristyli is a nuisance species in a minor traditional fibre plant locally used in the Philippines.
