= Batrachedrodes bedelliella =

Scientific classification
- Domain: Eukaryota
- Kingdom: Animalia
- Phylum: Arthropoda
- Class: Insecta
- Order: Lepidoptera
- Family: Momphidae
- Genus: Batrachedrodes
- Species: B. bedelliella

Binomial name
- Batrachedrodes bedelliella (Walsingham, 1907)

Synonyms
- Batrachedra bedelliella Walsingham, 1907

Moth species in family Momphidae

Batrachedrodes bedelliella is a moth of the family Momphidae. It was first described by Lord Walsingham in 1907. It is endemic to the Hawaiian islands. As of 1978, the distribution is not entirely clear. It is thought to be native to Oahu, Molokai, Maui and Hawaii, however only specimens from Maui and Molokai are certainly collected on those islands. The holotype was collected at Haleakala in Maui at 5,000 feet (1,500 m) elevation.

The larvae live among the sporangia of Asplenium nidus and Elaphoglossum reticulatum, hidden below a sheet of webbing.

Zimmerman found it most resembling Batrachedrodes syrraphella in his key to the genus Batrachedrodes, differing primarily due to its darker coloured wings. Both these species differ from B. ephelus by their larger, H-shaped gnathos (a dorsal flap of the tegumen positioned within the genital ring), with two longer lobes bridged by a distinct bar between them.
