= Enscepastra longirostris =

Scientific classification
- Kingdom: Animalia
- Phylum: Arthropoda
- Class: Insecta
- Order: Lepidoptera
- Family: Batrachedridae
- Genus: Enscepastra
- Species: E. longirostris

Binomial name
- Enscepastra longirostris Meyrick, 1926

Species of moth

Enscepastra longirostris is a species of moth of the family Batrachedridae. It is known from South Africa.
