= Enscepastra lathraea =

Scientific classification
- Kingdom: Animalia
- Phylum: Arthropoda
- Clade: Pancrustacea
- Class: Insecta
- Order: Lepidoptera
- Family: Batrachedridae
- Genus: Enscepastra
- Species: E. lathraea

Binomial name
- Enscepastra lathraea (Meyrick, 1920)

Synonyms
- Sandaloeca lathraea Meyrick, 1920

Species of moth

Enscepastra lathraea is a species of moth of the family Batrachedridae. It is known from South Africa.
