= Moanatuatua Scientific Reserve =

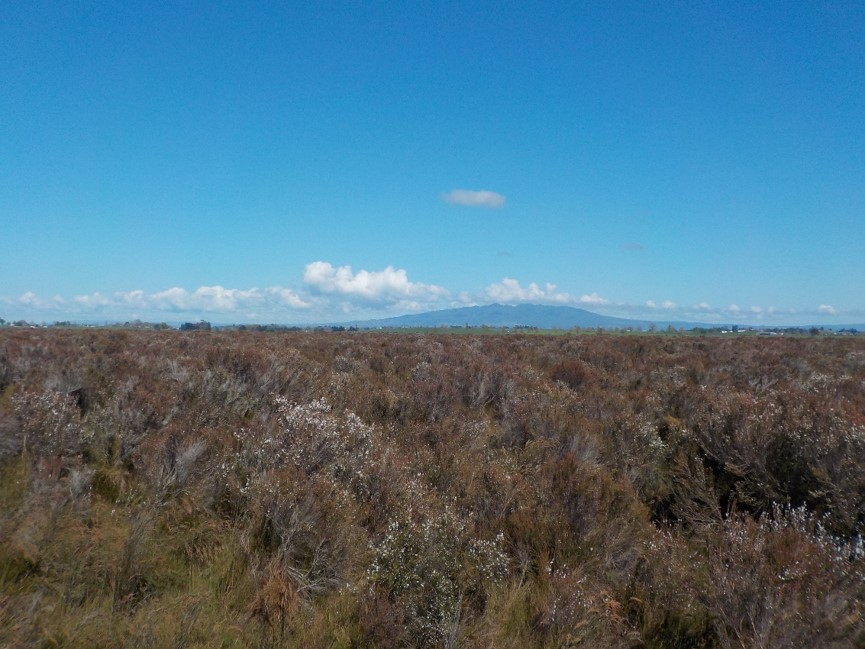
- From the center of the reserve looking out to Pirongia Mountain
- Interactive map of Moanatuatua Scientific Reserve
- Location: North Island, New Zealand
- Nearest city: Hamilton, New Zealand
- Coordinates: 37.925°S 175.369°E
- Area: 140 hectares (350 acres)

Moanatuatua scientific reserve is a 140 ha remnant of restiad (Restionaceae) peatland in the North Island of New Zealand. The bog was formerly ~ 7500 ha in size and was one of several large peatlands surrounding the city of Hamilton. Widespread drainage and conversion to agriculture has left only this small remnant of what was formerly the dominant ecosystem in the area.

Moanatuatua is the best studied peatland in New Zealand, with research commencing in 1917 and at least 40 separate investigations during the next 100 years. The site is of international interest with research being carried out by scientists based in the UK and Canada as well as locally in New Zealand. The peat contains well-preserved pollen grains and plant remains dating back 14,000 years, making the site an important palaeoclimatic record for New Zealand and the south pacific.

== Conservation value ==
Moanatuatua is one of the only three known sites to contain the rare rush-like plant Sporadanthus ferrugineus and the endemic moth Houdinia flexilissima known as 'Fred the thread', claimed to be the thinnest caterpillar in the world. The bog is also an important regional habitat for the native Fernbird and provides habitat for Swamp harriers which may in turn help minimise crop losses from nearby blueberry farms. Other vegetation at the site includes the fern Gleichenia dicarpa and the plant Empodisma robustum.

== History of Moanatuatua bog ==
Moanatuatua bog was taken in 1863 from the traditional Kaitiaki during the New Zealand Wars under the New Zealand settlement act. The bog was surveyed in 1868 by Edwin Davey with the peat depth being measured every 10 feet, though unfortunately the map has since been lost. The land was then sold to James Farmer of Epsom who sold it on to the absentee landowner Thomas Grice of Cumberland. The bog was managed by Barnes Walker and Thomas Douglas, who independently acquired tracts of land surrounding the bog. Walker is believed to have played a prominent part in early attempts to drain the bog and was instrumental in digging the main central drain in the summer of 1869-1870. The drain was commented on by the geologist Laurence Cussen in 1893 as the outflow had recently eroded a gully 70 ft deep where it flowed into the Waikato river. During the time the drain was being dug the settlers came into conflict with local Māori when they attempted to drain land south of the Aukati or confiscation line, a farm worker, Timothy Sullivan was killed in the ensuing conflict. By 1888, 800 ha had been converted to pastoral land and 225 km of drains had been dug, Despite this, the land owners found themselves in financial trouble and sold the eastern part of the bog to the New Zealand government in 1893. The government re-sold 560 ha of the bog to Richard Reynolds who described his approach to converting the bog to pasture in the following terms: “You cannot burn a peat swamp too deep, dry it as fast as possible and burn it as much as possible”.

== Research carried out at Moanatuatua bog ==
During the late 19th century observations of the plants at Moanatuatua were carried out by the botanist Thomas Frederic Cheeseman. However research at Moanatuatua peatland did not begin in earnest until 1917 with the early investigations of the peat by Bernard Cracroft Aston. During the 1930s the peat depth, surface contours and vegetation were studied and the site was described by the botanist Lucy Cranwell. In the 1950s and 1960s further botanical work was carried out by Ella Orr Campbell. In 1946 the Rukuhia Soil Fertility Research Station was set up with the main objective of carrying out practical investigations into farming the surrounding peatland, however some limited research was also performed on the natural peat ecosystem including chemical and nutrient analysis prior to water table lowering. Since 2010 research at Moanatuatua bog has been focused on the effect of lower water tables on plants, nutrient cycling, carbon storage and palaeoclimatic reconstructions.

== See also ==
- Kopuatai Peat Dome
- Wetlands of New Zealand
