= Enscepastra =

Scientific classification
- Kingdom: Animalia
- Phylum: Arthropoda
- Clade: Pancrustacea
- Class: Insecta
- Order: Lepidoptera
- Family: Batrachedridae
- Genus: Enscepastra; Meyrick, 1920

Synonyms
- Sandaloeca Meyrick, 1920

Genus of moths

Enscepastra is a genus of moths, belonging to the family Batrachedridae.

== Species ==
- Enscepastra acutissima Mey, 2011
- Enscepastra curvipalpata Mey, 2011
- Enscepastra cygnica Mey, 2011
- Enscepastra lathraea (Meyrick, 1920)
- Enscepastra longirostris Meyrick, 1926
- Enscepastra plagiopa Meyrick, 1920
- Enscepastra recurvata Mey, 2011
- Enscepastra scolopacina Mey, 2011

== Former species ==
- Enscepastra machimopis Meyrick, 1936
