= Duospina abolitor =

Scientific classification
- Domain: Eukaryota
- Kingdom: Animalia
- Phylum: Arthropoda
- Class: Insecta
- Order: Lepidoptera
- Family: Batrachedridae
- Genus: Duospina
- Species: D. abolitor

Binomial name
- Duospina abolitor Hodges, 1966

Moth species in family Batrachedridae

Duospina abolitor is a moth in the family Batrachedridae. It was described by Ronald W. Hodges in 1966. It is found in North America, where it has been recorded from Arizona.
