= Ifeda perobtusa =

Scientific classification
- Domain: Eukaryota
- Kingdom: Animalia
- Phylum: Arthropoda
- Class: Insecta
- Order: Lepidoptera
- Family: Batrachedridae
- Genus: Ifeda
- Species: I. perobtusa

Binomial name
- Ifeda perobtusa (Meyrick, 1922)

Synonyms
- Batrachedra perobtusa Meyrick, 1922

Moth species in family Batrachedridae

Ifeda perobtusa is a species of moth of the family Batrachedridae. It is found in Brazil, British Guiana and Peru. Its alar expense is 8-10mm.

The larvae feed on the flowers of palm species.
