= Duospina trichella =

Scientific classification
- Domain: Eukaryota
- Kingdom: Animalia
- Phylum: Arthropoda
- Class: Insecta
- Order: Lepidoptera
- Family: Batrachedridae
- Genus: Duospina
- Species: D. trichella

Binomial name
- Duospina trichella (Busck, 1908)

Synonyms
- Batrachedra trichella Busck, 1908; Batrachedra concors Meyrick 1917

Moth species in family Batrachedridae

Duospina trichella is a moth in the family Batrachedridae. It was described by August Busck in 1908. It is found in North America, where it has been recorded from Florida, Illinois, Indiana, Louisiana, Maine, Maryland, Ohio, Quebec and West Virginia.

The wingspan is about 13 mm (about 0,5 inches). Adults have been recorded on wing in March and from June to September.
