= Enscepastra plagiopa =

Scientific classification
- Kingdom: Animalia
- Phylum: Arthropoda
- Class: Insecta
- Order: Lepidoptera
- Family: Batrachedridae
- Genus: Enscepastra
- Species: E. plagiopa

Binomial name
- Enscepastra plagiopa Meyrick, 1920

Species of moth

Enscepastra plagiopa is a species of moth of the family Batrachedridae. It native to South Africa.
