= Polopeustis altensis =

Scientific classification
- Kingdom: Animalia
- Phylum: Arthropoda
- Clade: Pancrustacea
- Class: Insecta
- Order: Lepidoptera
- Family: Pyralidae
- Genus: Polopeustis
- Species: P. altensis

Binomial name
- Polopeustis altensis (Wocke, 1862)

Synonyms
- Myelois altensis Wocke, 1862

Species of moth

Polopeustis altensis is a species of snout moth described by Maximilian Ferdinand Wocke in 1862. It is found in Fennoscandia and northern Russia.

The wingspan is 16–21 mm. Adults are on wing from June to July.

The larvae possibly feed on Dryas species.
