= Enscepastra cygnica =

Scientific classification
- Kingdom: Animalia
- Phylum: Arthropoda
- Clade: Pancrustacea
- Class: Insecta
- Order: Lepidoptera
- Family: Batrachedridae
- Genus: Enscepastra
- Species: E. cygnica

Binomial name
- Enscepastra cygnica Mey, 2011

Species of moth

Enscepastra cygnica is a moth of the family Batrachedridae. It was described by Wolfram Mey in 2011. It is found in South Africa, where it has been recorded from the Western Cape.
