= Kopuatai Peat Dome =

Wetland in New Zealand

Coordinates: 37°26′S 175°33′E

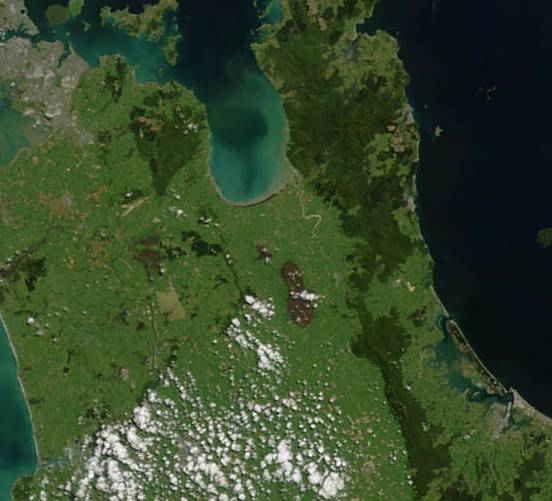
- Kopuatai Peat Dome is the brown footprint-shaped area at centre
- Interactive map of Kopuatai Peat Dome
- Location: North Island, New Zealand
- Area: 10,201 hectares (25,210 acres)

Ramsar Wetland
- Designated: 4 December 1989
- Reference no.: 444

The Kopuatai Peat Dome is a large peatland complex on the Hauraki Plains in the North Island of New Zealand. It consists of two raised domes, one in the north and the other in the south, that are up to three metres higher at the center than at the edge. The 10,201 hectares (25,210 acres) wetland contains the largest intact raised bog in New Zealand and was listed under the Ramsar Convention in 1989 as a Wetland of International Importance. Most of the wetland is ombrotrophic, meaning it receives water and nutrient inputs solely from rain and is hydrologically isolated from the surrounding canals and rivers. Locally, a popular misconception persists that water flows from the nearby Piako River into the bog and that the wetland acts as a significant store for floodwater.

== History of the wetland ==
Kopuatai has survived extensive draining of the wetlands on the Hauraki Plains and was given protection in 1987 when it came under the administration of the newly formed Department of Conservation.

== Scientific and conservation value ==
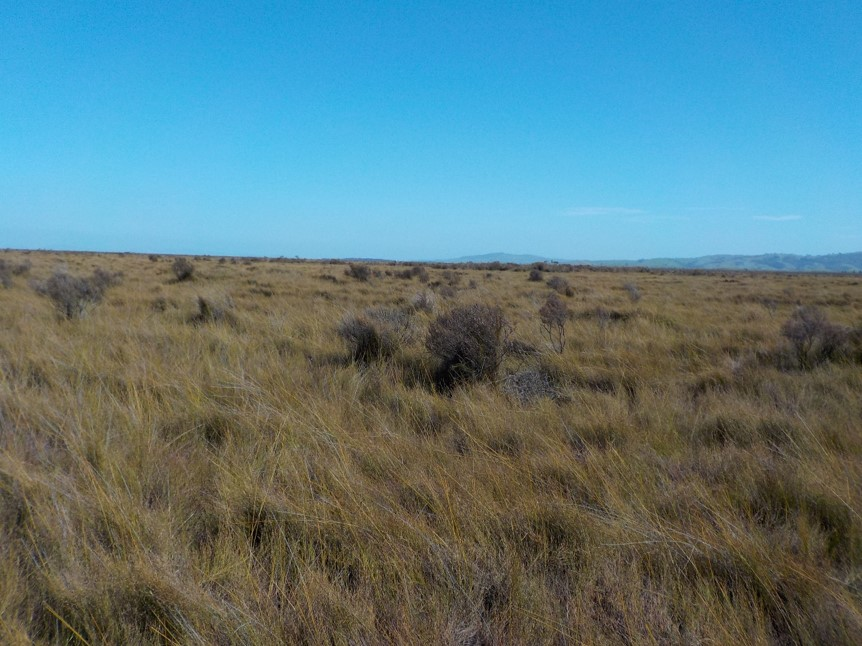
Looking westward from the center of Kopuatai bog towards the Hapuakohe Range.

Kopuatai contains the largest remaining population of Sporadanthus ferrugineus, a peat-forming plant that was once widespread in the upper North Island, but is now found in only a few places, in the Hauraki Plains and Waikato basin. S. ferrugineus in turn provides the only known food source for the rare endemic moth Houdinia flexilissima, also known as 'Fred the thread', described as recently as 2006 and remarkable for being the thinnest caterpillar in the world. A number of other undescribed insect species are thought to inhabit the peat dome. Other plant species found at Kopuatai are the peat-forming plant Empodisma robustum and the fern Gleichenia dicarpa.

Kopuatai is remarkable for being an exceptionally strong sink for carbon dioxide compared to other bogs globally. Carbon dioxide is absorbed from the atmosphere by the peat-forming plants and transformed into peat which can be up to 12 meters thick in parts of the bog.

== See also ==
- Environment of New Zealand
- Moanatuatua Scientific Reserve
- Wetlands of New Zealand
