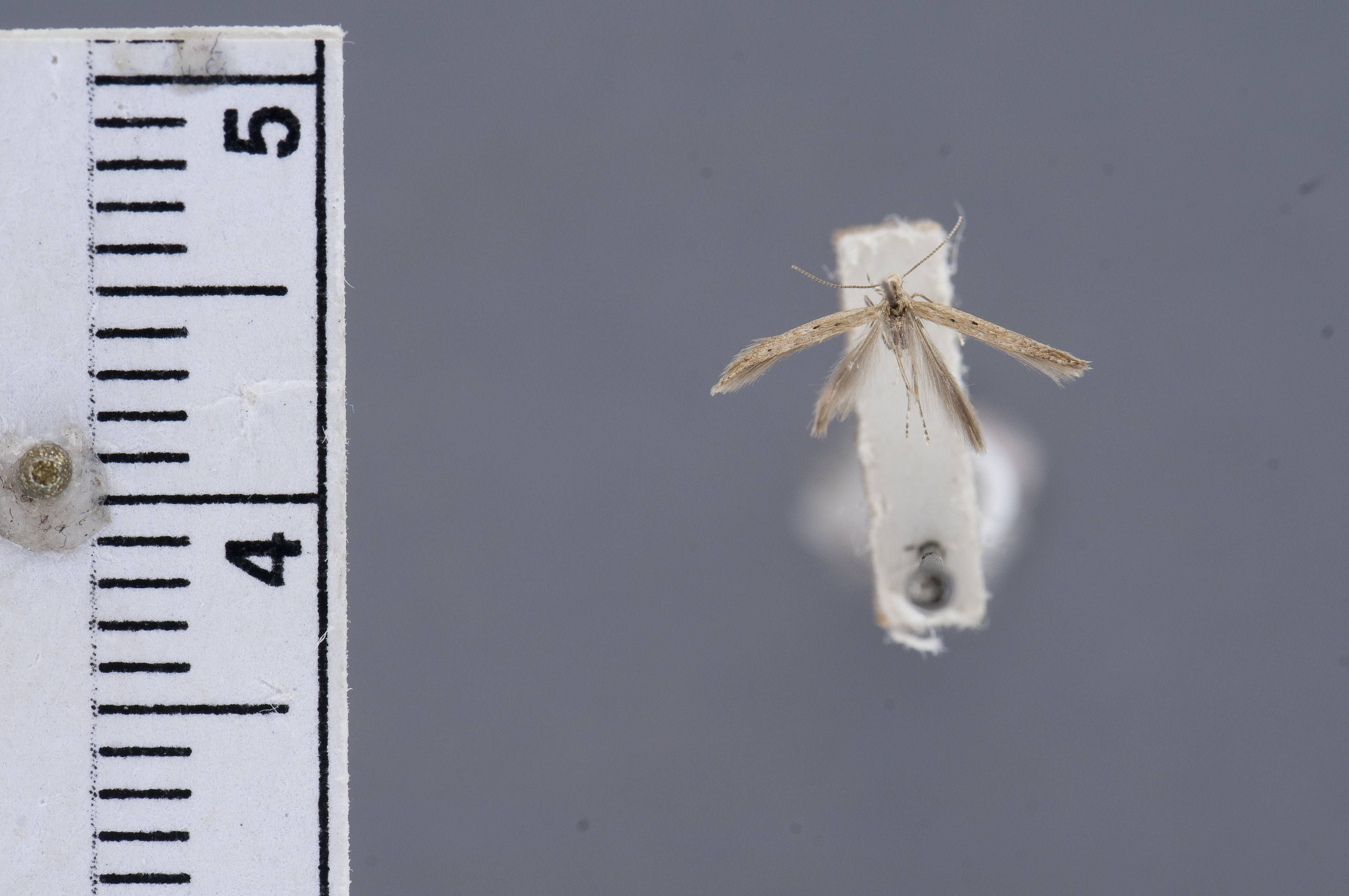
- Holotype

Scientific classification
- Kingdom: Animalia
- Phylum: Arthropoda
- Clade: Pancrustacea
- Class: Insecta
- Order: Lepidoptera
- Family: Batrachedridae
- Genus: Chedra
- Species: C. delector

Binomial name
- Chedra delector Hodges, 1966

= Chedra delector =

Moth species in family Batrachedridae

Chedra delector is a tiny moth placed in the family Batrachedridae. The Global Lepidoptera Names Index of the Natural History Museum in London classifies it in the family Coleophoridae based on the old classification given by Ron Hodges in the 1983 Check List of the Lepidoptera of America North of Mexico. It is found in Chile. The holotype was collected by D. Bullock on 30 January 1941 at Angol, in the Malleco Province, central Chile, and is kept at the Department of Entomology of the National Museum of Natural History of the Smithsonian Institution. The species was described by Ron Hodges in 1966. The caterpillars feed upon the seeds of Cyperaceae.
