= Chedra inquisitor =

Scientific classification
- Domain: Eukaryota
- Kingdom: Animalia
- Phylum: Arthropoda
- Class: Insecta
- Order: Lepidoptera
- Family: Batrachedridae
- Genus: Chedra
- Species: C. inquisitor

Binomial name
- Chedra inquisitor Hodges, 1966

Moth species in family Batrachedridae

Chedra inquisitor is a moth in the family Batrachedridae. It was described by Ronald W. Hodges in 1966 and is endemic to the US state of Illinois.
