= Polopeustis =

Scientific classification
- Kingdom: Animalia
- Phylum: Arthropoda
- Class: Insecta
- Order: Lepidoptera
- Family: Pyralidae
- Tribe: Phycitini
- Genus: Polopeustis; Ragonot, 1893

Genus of moths

Polopeustis is a genus of snout moths described by Émile Louis Ragonot in 1893.

== Species ==
- Polopeustis altensis (Wocke, 1862)
- Polopeustis arctiella (Gibson, 1920)
