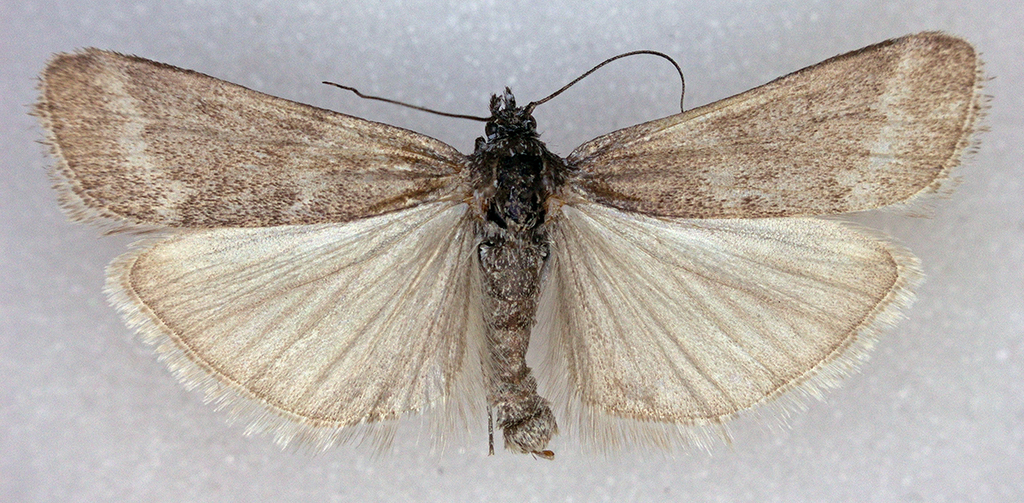

Scientific classification
- Kingdom: Animalia
- Phylum: Arthropoda
- Class: Insecta
- Order: Lepidoptera
- Family: Pyralidae
- Genus: Polopeustis
- Species: P. arctiella

Binomial name
- Polopeustis arctiella (Gibson, 1920)

Synonyms
- Pyla arctiella Gibson, 1920

= Polopeustis arctiella =

Species of moth

Polopeustis arctiella is a species of snout moth. It is found in northern North America, including Alberta, Manitoba and Nunavut.

The wingspan is about 22 mm.
