= Corythangela =

Scientific classification
- Kingdom: Animalia
- Phylum: Arthropoda
- Clade: Pancrustacea
- Class: Insecta
- Order: Lepidoptera
- Family: Batrachedridae
- Genus: Corythangela; Meyrick, 1897

Synonyms
- Corythangella Capuse, 1973 (incorrect subsequent spelling)

Moth genus in family Batrachedridae

Corythangela is a genus of moth, belonging to the family Batrachedridae. It was transferred to this family by Baldizonne in 1996 (it was traditionally grouped in the Coleophoridae).

== Species ==
- Corythangela galeata Meyrick, 1897
- Corythangela fimbriata Baldizzone, 1996
