= Batrachedrodes lomentella =

Scientific classification
- Domain: Eukaryota
- Kingdom: Animalia
- Phylum: Arthropoda
- Class: Insecta
- Order: Lepidoptera
- Family: Momphidae
- Genus: Batrachedrodes
- Species: B. lomentella

Binomial name
- Batrachedrodes lomentella (Walsingham, 1907)

Synonyms
- Batrachedra lomentella Walsingham, 1907

Moth species in family Momphidae

Batrachedrodes lomentella is a moth of the family Momphidae. It was first described by Lord Walsingham in 1907. It is endemic to the Hawaiian islands of Oahu and Hawaii.

The larvae have been found among the dead leaves of an unidentified fern.
