= Duospina =

Scientific classification
- Kingdom: Animalia
- Phylum: Arthropoda
- Clade: Pancrustacea
- Class: Insecta
- Order: Lepidoptera
- Family: Batrachedridae
- Genus: Duospina; Hodges, 1966

Moth genus in family Batrachedridae

Duospina is a genus of moths, belonging to the family Batrachedridae. It was formerly included in the Coleophoridae.

== Species ==
- Duospina abolitor Hodges, 1966
- Duospina europaea Labonne, Nel & Varenne, 2019
- Duospina trichella (Busck, 1908)
