= Batrachedrodes =

Scientific classification
- Kingdom: Animalia
- Phylum: Arthropoda
- Clade: Pancrustacea
- Class: Insecta
- Order: Lepidoptera
- Family: Momphidae
- Genus: Batrachedrodes; Zimmerman, 1978

Moth genus endemic to Hawaii in family Momphidae

Batrachedrodes is a genus of moths of the Momphidae family. All species of this genus are endemic to the Hawaiian Islands.

All six species were collected by Robert Cyril Layton Perkins and then described by Thomas de Grey, 6th Baron Walsingham in 1907. He classified them in the genus Batrachedra, although before publication he questioned if these species were not so distinct that they were better segregated in an independent genus. The genus was eventually split from Batrachedra by Elwood Zimmerman in his 1978 treatment of the microlepidoptera of Hawaii.

The species were first considered to be part of the family Batrachedridae, but were placed in the subfamily Momphinae of the family Gelechiidae with the rest of the Batrachedridae by Zimmerman in 1978.

The caterpillars of all known species feed upon the sporangia found on the undersides of the fronds of various genera of ferns, including, but quite likely not limited to: Asplenium, Elaphoglossum, Aspidium and Dryopteris. They live protected under a silken webbing.

== Species ==
- Batrachedrodes bedelliella (Walsingham, 1907)
- Batrachedrodes ephelus (Walsingham, 1907)
- Batrachedrodes lomentella (Walsingham, 1907)
- Batrachedrodes sophroniella (Walsingham, 1907)
- Batrachedrodes supercincta (Walsingham, 1907)
- Batrachedrodes syrraphella (Walsingham, 1907)
