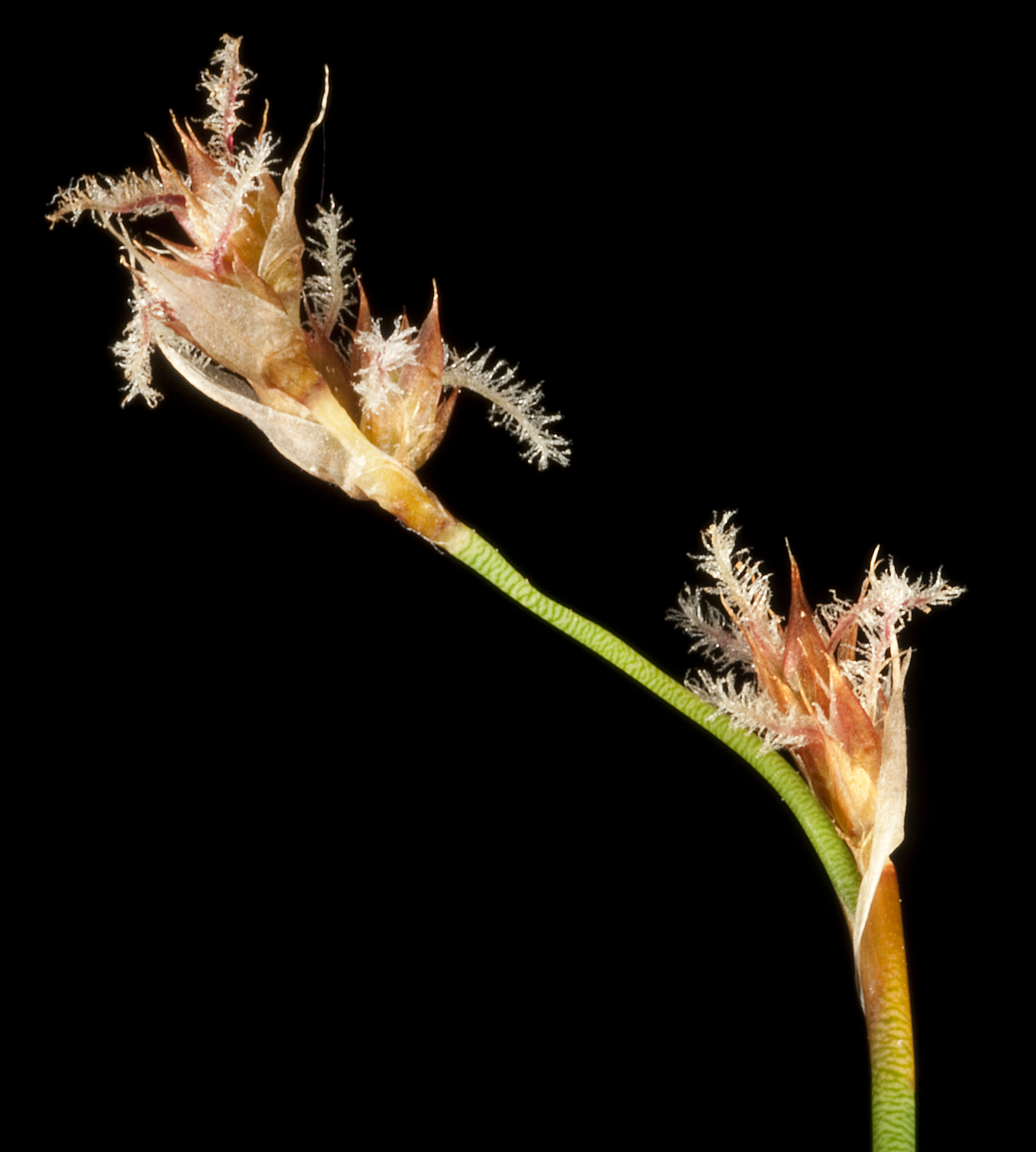
- Female flowers
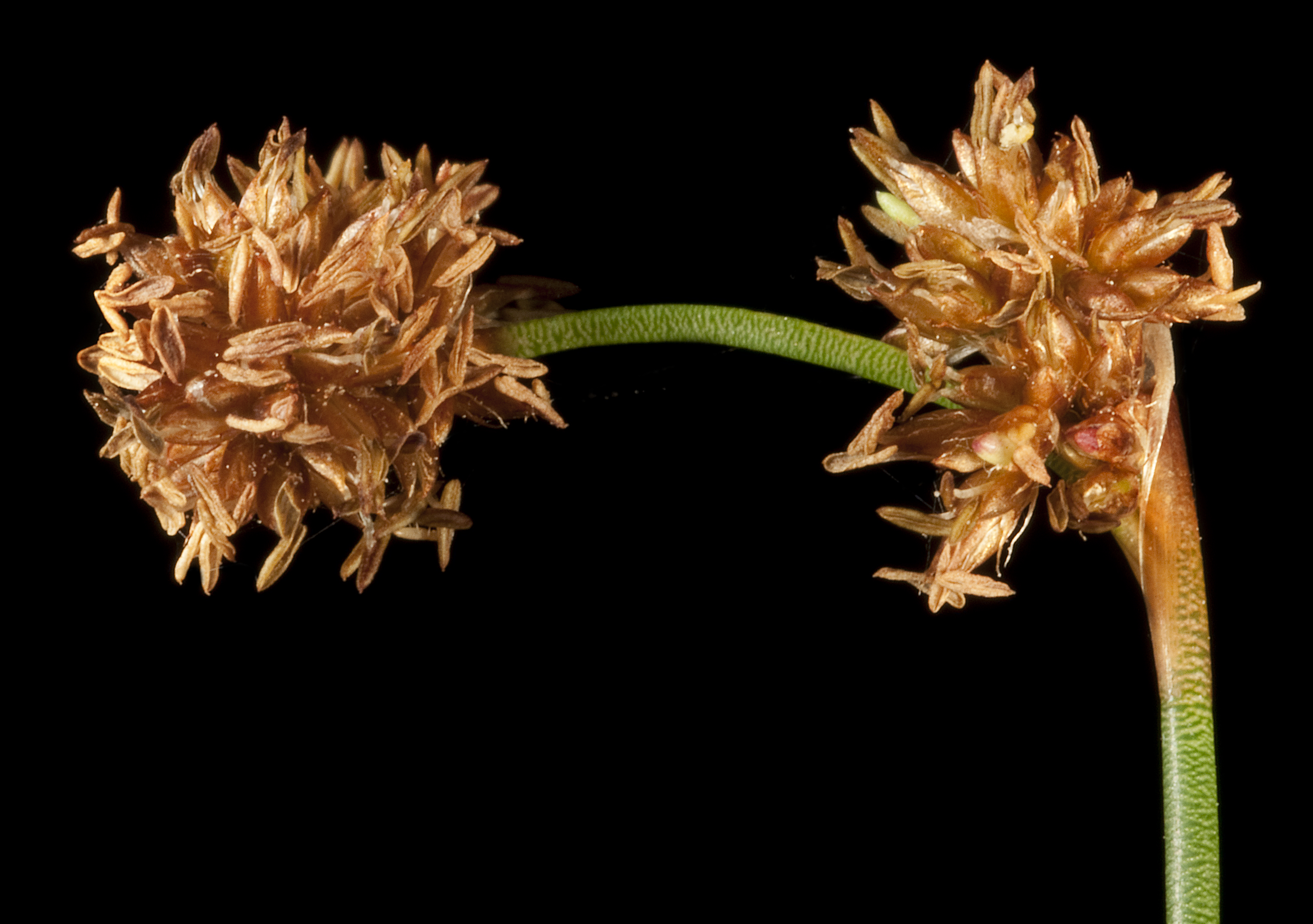
- Male flowers

Scientific classification
- Kingdom: Plantae
- Clade: Tracheophytes
- Clade: Angiosperms
- Clade: Monocots
- Clade: Commelinids
- Order: Poales
- Family: Restionaceae
- Genus: Sporadanthus
- Species: S. rivularis

Binomial name
- Sporadanthus rivularis B.G.Briggs & L.A.S.Johnson

= Sporadanthus rivularis =

Species of herb

Sporadanthus rivularis is a sedge-like herb in the Restionaceae family, native to Western Australia. It is a spreading perennial growing from rhizomes to heights of from 1 to 1.2 m, on black sands and clay along creek edges. It is a dioecious species.

This species was first described by Barbara Briggs and Lawrie Johnson in 2012. The specific epithet, rivularis, derives from Latin and means "of a brook or stream" referring to the species' occurrence near rivers and creeks.

== Distribution ==
It is found in the IBRA Regions of Jarrah Forest, Swan Coastal Plain, and Warren.
