= Corythangela galeata =

Scientific classification
- Domain: Eukaryota
- Kingdom: Animalia
- Phylum: Arthropoda
- Class: Insecta
- Order: Lepidoptera
- Family: Batrachedridae
- Genus: Corythangela
- Species: C. galeata

Binomial name
- Corythangela galeata Meyrick, 1897

Moth species in family Batrachedridae

Corythangela galeata is a moth of the family Batrachedridae. It is known only from localities near Sydney in New South Wales, Australia.

The larvae feed on Casuarina species. They construct a slender, elongate case from small pieces of the branches of their host plant.
