= Corythangela fimbriata =

Scientific classification
- Domain: Eukaryota
- Kingdom: Animalia
- Phylum: Arthropoda
- Class: Insecta
- Order: Lepidoptera
- Family: Batrachedridae
- Genus: Corythangela
- Species: C. fimbriata

Binomial name
- Corythangela fimbriata Baldizzone, 1996

Moth species in family Batrachedridae

Corythangela fimbriata is a moth of the family Batrachedridae. It is found in Western Australia.

The wingspan is about 10 mm.
