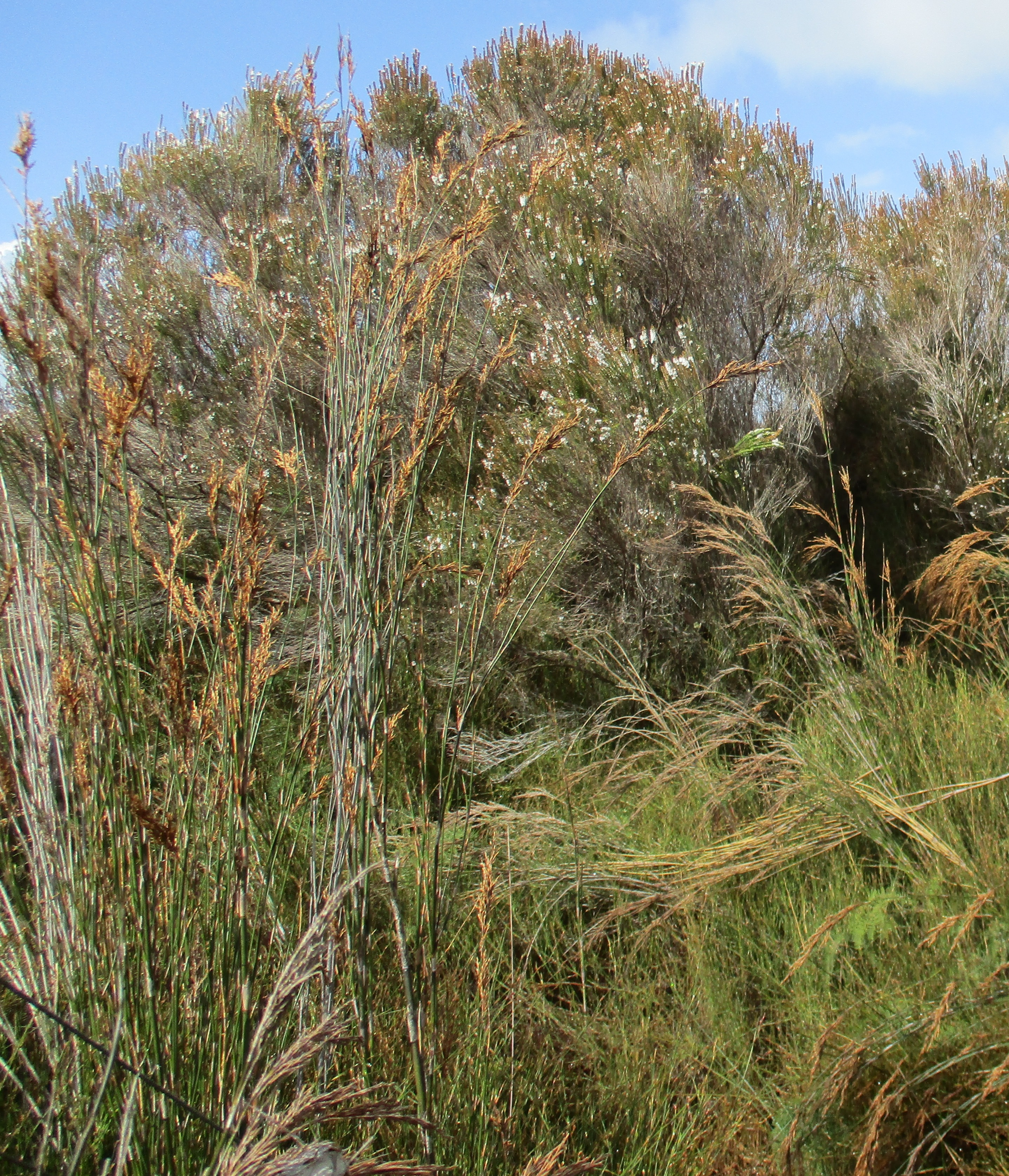
- Sporadanthus ferrugineus growing at the bog of Moanatuatua Scientific Reserve

Conservation status
- Relict (NZ TCS)

Scientific classification
- Kingdom: Plantae
- Clade: Tracheophytes
- Clade: Angiosperms
- Clade: Monocots
- Clade: Commelinids
- Order: Poales
- Family: Restionaceae
- Genus: Sporadanthus
- Species: S. ferrugineus

Binomial name
- Sporadanthus ferrugineus de Lange, Heenan & B.D.Clarkson, 1999

= Sporadanthus ferrugineus =

Species of flowering plant

Sporadanthus ferrugineus, the bamboo rush or giant wire rush, is a restiad plant endemic to the northern North Island of New Zealand.

== Taxonomy ==
It was long considered that Sporadanthus plants in the North Island were the same species as Sporadanthus traversii, which is native to Chatham Island, east of the New Zealand mainland. The North Island plants were described as the separate species S. ferrugineus in 1999, with S. traversii becoming regarded as endemic to Chatham Island.

== Distribution ==
S. ferrugineus grows in acidic, ombrotrophic, restiad-dominated raised bogs. Draining of such bogs for farming in the northern North Island has greatly reduced their extent. S. ferrugineus is now mainly found at the peat domes of Kopuatai and Torehape on the Hauraki Plains and Moanatuatua Swamp in the Waikato basin.

== Biology ==
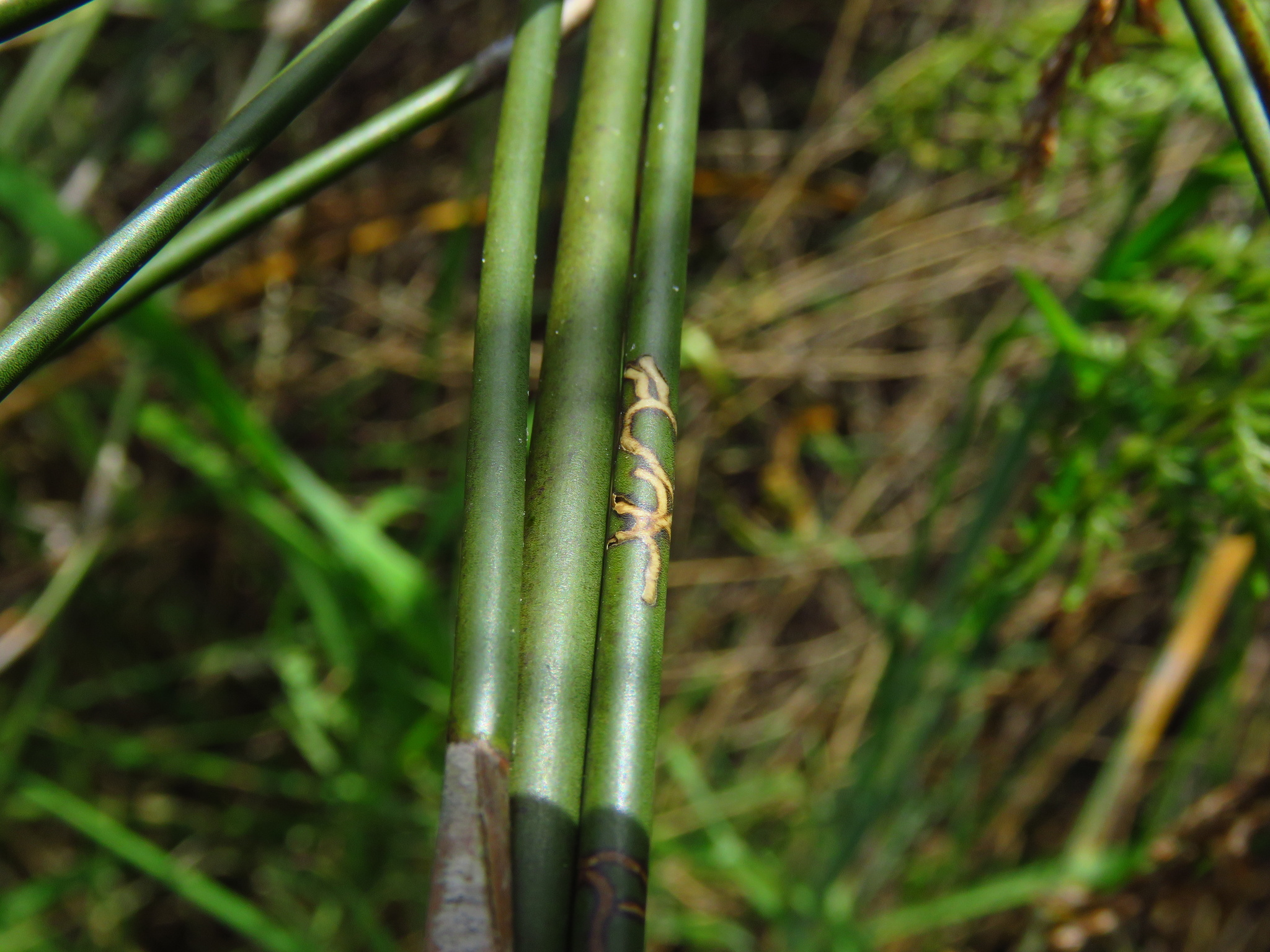
Evidence of feeding by Houdinia flexilissima

S. ferrugineus is the only known food source for the moth Houdinia flexilissima.

== Conservation ==
Under the New Zealand Threat Classification System, it is classified as "At Risk - Relict" (It has both a restricted range, and its documented decline shows it as now occupying less than 10% of its former range, but the population is considered stable.)

In 2011, it was voted "Plant of the Year" in a poll run by the New Zealand Plant Conservation Network.
