= Ifeda =

Scientific classification
- Kingdom: Animalia
- Phylum: Arthropoda
- Clade: Pancrustacea
- Class: Insecta
- Order: Lepidoptera
- Family: Batrachedridae
- Genus: Ifeda; Hodges, 1966

Moth genus in family Batrachedridae

Ifeda is a genus of moths, belonging to the family Batrachedridae.

== Selected species ==
- Ifeda perobtusa (Meyrick, 1922)
