= Rakatu Wetlands =

Wetland restoration project on the South Island of New Zealand

Coordinates: 45.706181°S 167.629395°E

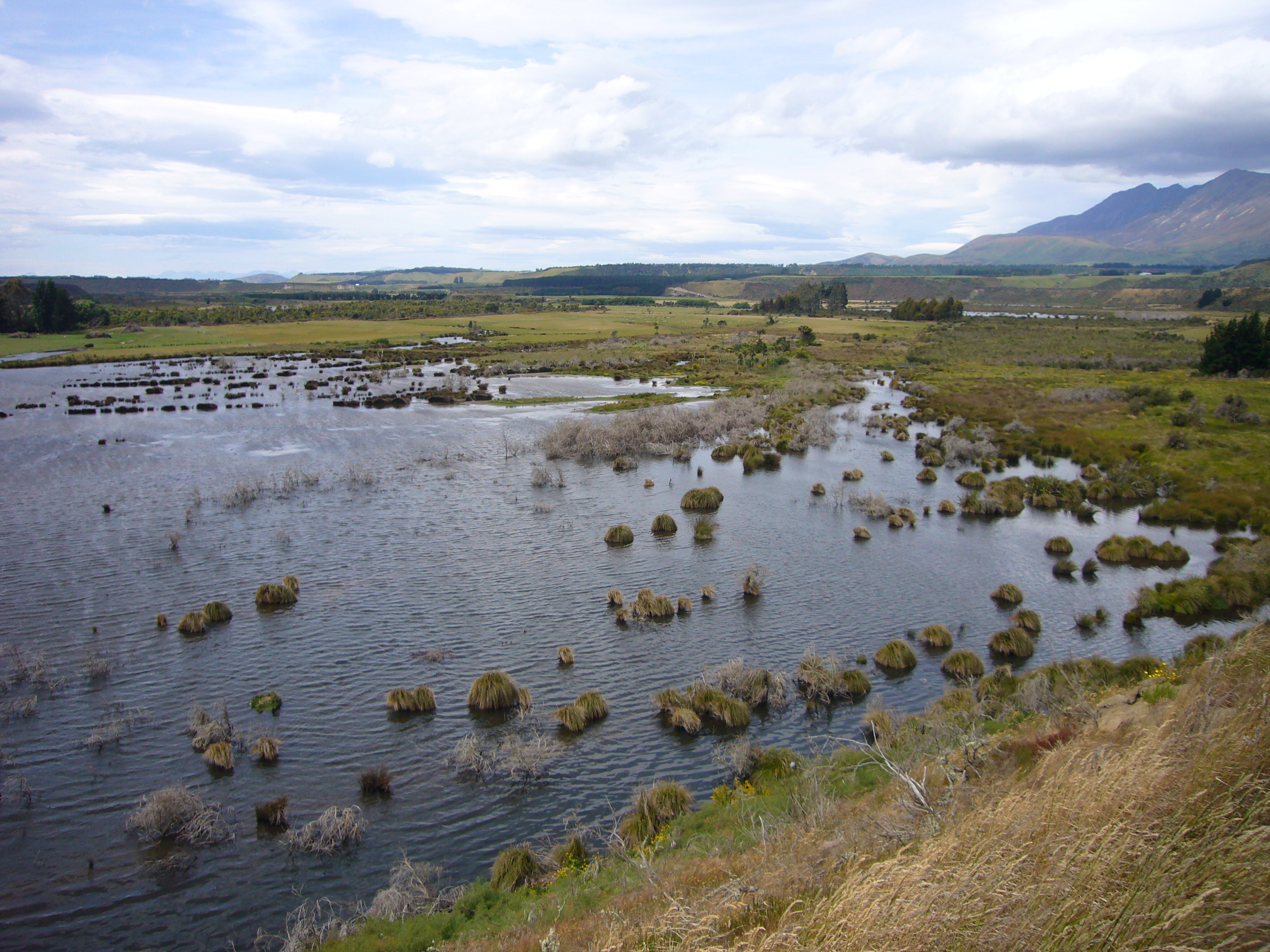
Part of Rakatu Wetlands viewed to the north.

The Rakatu Wetlands is a 278 ha wetland restoration project on the South Island of New Zealand. They officially opened on 18 March 2006.

It is administered by the Waiau Fisheries and Wildlife Habitat Enhancement Trust. The Trust was set up in 1996 to address the environmental effects of the construction of the Manapouri Power Station. Since much of the natural flow of the Waiau River was diverted through the power station and out to sea, the ecological characteristics of the river and the wetlands were changed due to lower river levels.

The Trust has constructed walkways and interpretation panels at the wetland.

== See also ==
- Wetlands of New Zealand
- Conservation in New Zealand
