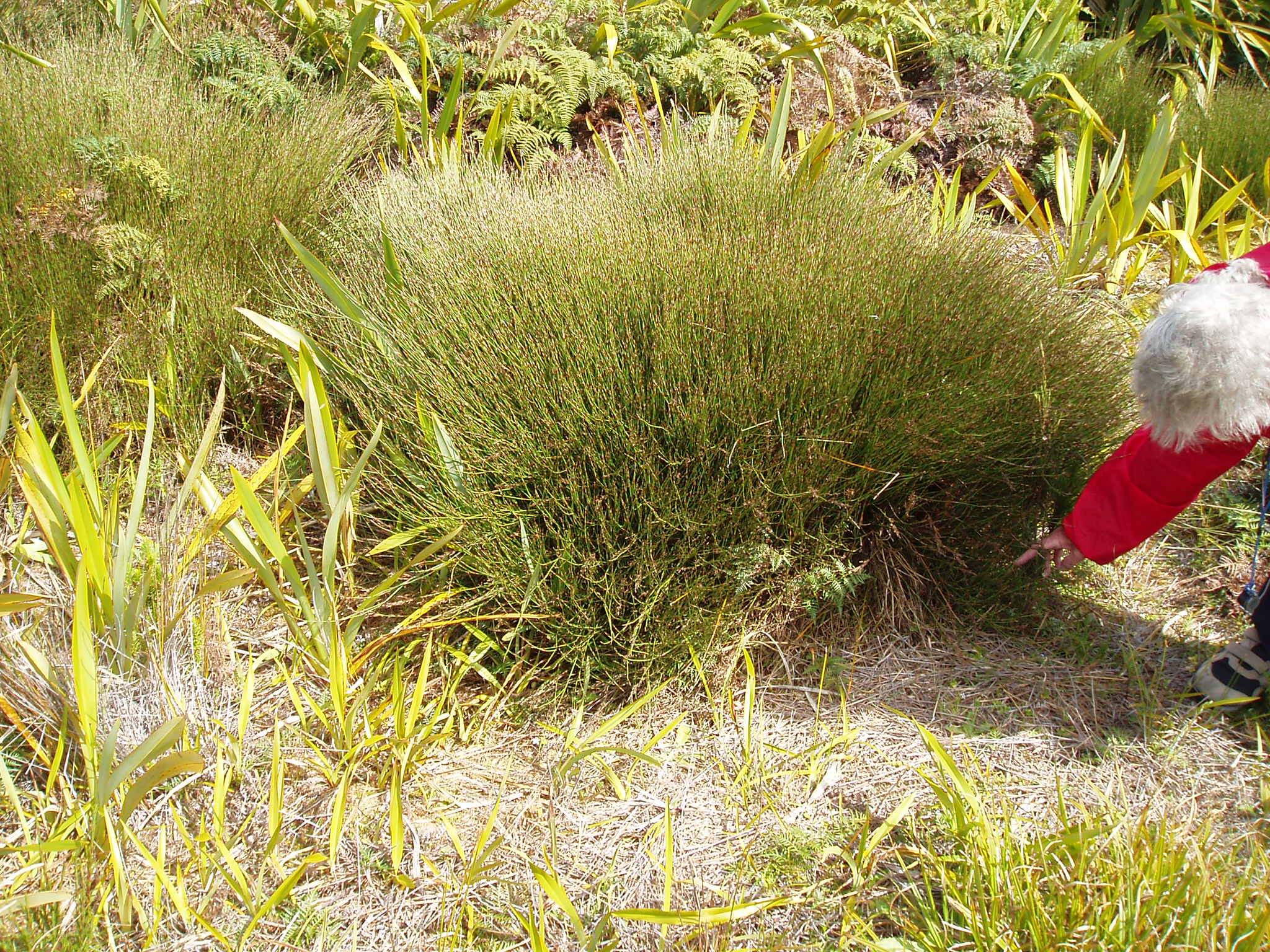
- Sporadanthus traversii

Scientific classification
- Kingdom: Plantae
- Clade: Tracheophytes
- Clade: Angiosperms
- Clade: Monocots
- Clade: Commelinids
- Order: Poales
- Family: Restionaceae
- Genus: Sporadanthus; F.Muell. ex Buchanan

Type species
- Sporadanthus traversii (F. Muell.) F. Muell. ex Kirk.

= Sporadanthus =

Genus of plants

Sporadanthus is a group of plants in the Restionaceae first described as a genus in 1874 by Ferdinand von Mueller. It is native to Australia and New Zealand.

Species

- Sporadanthus caudatus - Qld, NSW
- Sporadanthus ferrugineus - North Island
- Sporadanthus gracilis - NSW
- Sporadanthus interruptus - Qld, NSW
- Sporadanthus strictus - WA
- Sporadanthus rivularis - WA
- Sporadanthus tasmanicus - Tas
- Sporadanthus traversii - North Island, Chatham Is
