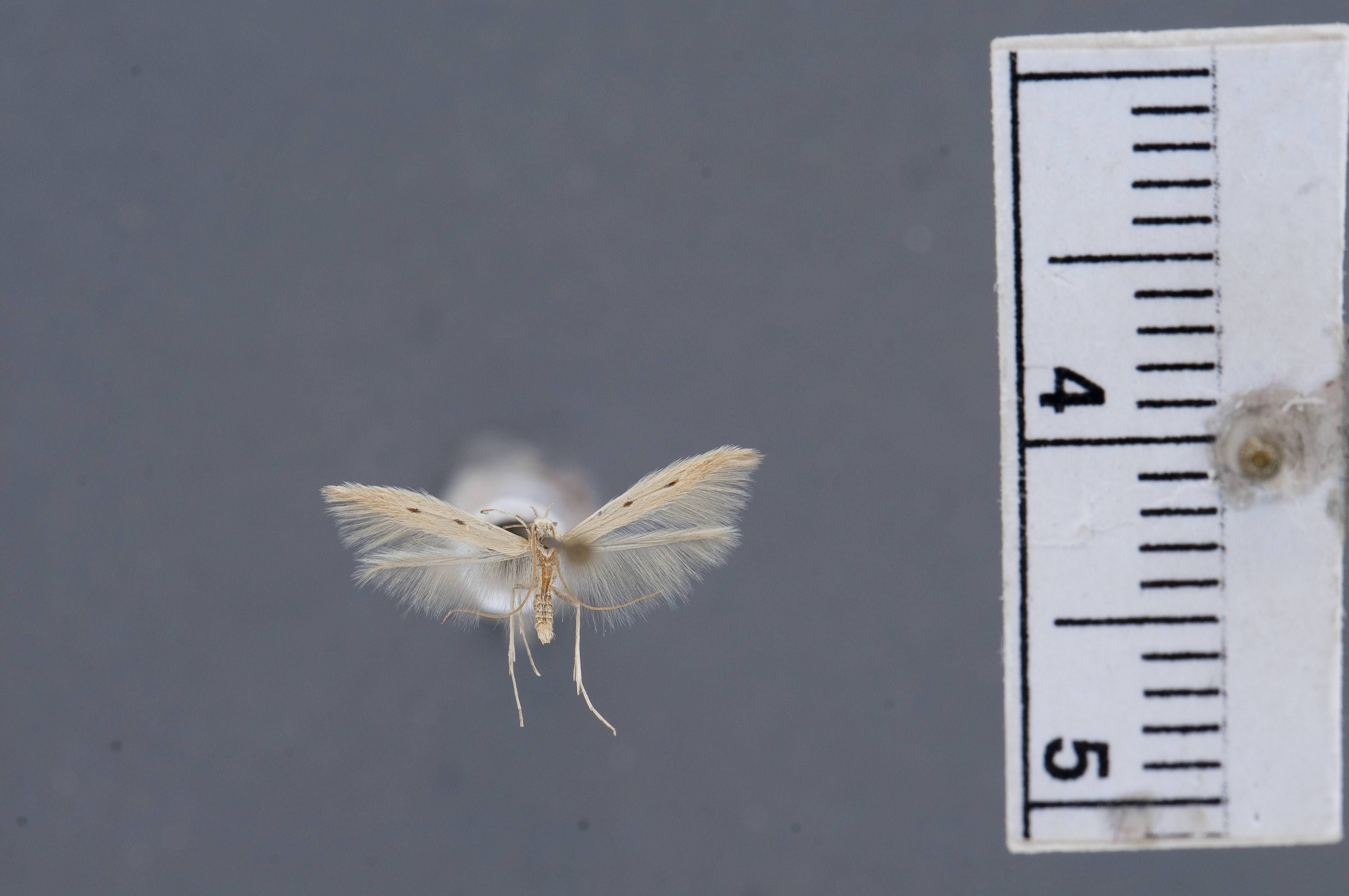
- holotype of Chedra pensor from Arizona

Scientific classification
- Kingdom: Animalia
- Phylum: Arthropoda
- Clade: Pancrustacea
- Class: Insecta
- Order: Lepidoptera
- Family: Batrachedridae
- Genus: Chedra
- Species: C. pensor

Binomial name
- Chedra pensor Hodges, 1966

= Chedra pensor =

Moth species in family Batrachedridae

Chedra pensor is a tiny dwarf moth in the family Batrachedridae. It was collected by Ronald W. Hodges at a place called West Fork, 16 miles (26 km) southwest of Flagstaff, Coconino County, Arizona, in the United States, at 1,981 metres (6,499 ft) in elevation in early July, and subsequently described by him in 1966. It has been found in the US states of California, Arizona and Illinois. The holotype is kept at the Department of Entomology of the National Museum of Natural History, Smithsonian Institution. It is the type species of the genus Chedra.
