= Batrachedrodes supercincta =

Scientific classification
- Domain: Eukaryota
- Kingdom: Animalia
- Phylum: Arthropoda
- Class: Insecta
- Order: Lepidoptera
- Family: Momphidae
- Genus: Batrachedrodes
- Species: B. supercincta

Binomial name
- Batrachedrodes supercincta (Walsingham, 1907)

Synonyms
- Batrachedra supercincta Walsingham, 1907

Moth species in family Momphidae

Batrachedrodes supercincta is a moth of the family Momphidae. It was first described by Lord Walsingham in 1907. It is endemic to the Hawaiian island of Maui.

The larvae probably feed on a fern species.
