= Coleophora fuscosquamata =

Scientific classification
- Kingdom: Animalia
- Phylum: Arthropoda
- Clade: Pancrustacea
- Class: Insecta
- Order: Lepidoptera
- Family: Coleophoridae
- Genus: Coleophora
- Species: C. fuscosquamata

Binomial name
- Coleophora fuscosquamata Baldizzone, 1996

Species of moth

Coleophora fuscosquamata is a moth of the family Coleophoridae. It is found in central Australia near the border between Western Australia and the Northern Territory.

The wingspan is 8–9 mm (0.31–0.35 in).
