= Coleophora machinopis =

Scientific classification
- Kingdom: Animalia
- Phylum: Arthropoda
- Class: Insecta
- Order: Lepidoptera
- Family: Coleophoridae
- Genus: Coleophora
- Species: C. machinopis

Binomial name
- Coleophora machinopis (Meyrick, 1936)

Synonyms
- Enscepastra machinopis Meyrick, 1936; Enscepastra machimopis Meyrick, 1937; Coleophora alhagii Falkovitsh, 1972

Species of moth

Coleophora machinopis is a moth of the family Coleophoridae. It is found in Iraq, Turkestan, Uzbekistan and Turkey.

The larvae feed on Alhagi sparsifolia and possibly other Alhagi species.
