= Coleophora tremefacta =

Scientific classification
- Kingdom: Animalia
- Phylum: Arthropoda
- Class: Insecta
- Order: Lepidoptera
- Family: Coleophoridae
- Genus: Coleophora
- Species: C. tremefacta

Binomial name
- Coleophora tremefacta Meyrick, 1921

Species of moth

Coleophora tremefacta is a moth of the family Coleophoridae. It is found in Australia in the coastal regions of South Australia, north of Adelaide.
