= Coleophora consumpta =

Scientific classification
- Kingdom: Animalia
- Phylum: Arthropoda
- Clade: Pancrustacea
- Class: Insecta
- Order: Lepidoptera
- Family: Coleophoridae
- Genus: Coleophora
- Species: C. consumpta

Binomial name
- Coleophora consumpta Baldizzone, 1996

Species of moth

Coleophora consumpta is a moth of the family Coleophoridae. It is found east of the Nullarbor Plain in Australia.

The wingspan is about 9 mm (0.35 in).
