= Batrachedrodes syrraphella =

Scientific classification
- Domain: Eukaryota
- Kingdom: Animalia
- Phylum: Arthropoda
- Class: Insecta
- Order: Lepidoptera
- Family: Momphidae
- Genus: Batrachedrodes
- Species: B. syrraphella

Binomial name
- Batrachedrodes syrraphella (Walsingham, 1907)

Synonyms
- Batrachedra syrraphella Walsingham, 1907

Moth species in family Momphidae

Batrachedrodes syrraphella is a moth of the family Momphidae. It was first described by Lord Walsingham in 1907. It is endemic to the Hawaiian islands of Oahu and Hawaii.

The larvae feed on Thelypteris parasitica (Thelypteridaceae) and Dryopteris parasitica. They make tubes of white silk among the sporangia upon which they feed.
