= Coleophora leucocephala =

Scientific classification
- Kingdom: Animalia
- Phylum: Arthropoda
- Clade: Pancrustacea
- Class: Insecta
- Order: Lepidoptera
- Family: Coleophoridae
- Genus: Coleophora
- Species: C. leucocephala

Binomial name
- Coleophora leucocephala Baldizzone, 1996

Species of moth

Coleophora leucocephala is a moth of the family Coleophoridae. It is found in the dry areas of South Australia.

The wingspan is 9–10 mm (0.35–0.39 in).
