= Houdinia =

Conservation status
- Relict (NZ TCS)

Scientific classification
- Kingdom: Animalia
- Phylum: Arthropoda
- Clade: Pancrustacea
- Class: Insecta
- Order: Lepidoptera
- Family: Batrachedridae
- Genus: Houdinia; Hoare, Dugdale & Watts, 2006
- Species: H. flexilissima

Binomial name
- Houdinia flexilissima Hoare, Dugdale & Watts, 2006

Monotypic moth genus in family Batrachedridae

Houdinia is a monotypic genus of moths in the family Batrachedridae. Its sole species, Houdinia flexilissima, is endemic to raised bogs in northern New Zealand. It is classified as "At Risk, Relict" by the Department of Conservation. The caterpillars are sometimes referred to as Fred the thread.

== Taxonomy ==
This species was first described by Robert Hoare, John Dugdale and Corinne Watts in 2006 using a specimen collected at Torehape wetland, in Waikato. The holotype specimen is a male collected at the Torehape wetland held in the New Zealand Arthropod Collection.

Two other taxa which were discovered earlier but which have remained undescribed are likely closely related to this moth: a species which tunnels in Machaerina teretifolia in New Zealand, and another in Lomandra longifolia in Australia.

The species appears to be morphologically the most similar to the also recently described Japanese species Epimarptis hiranoi, along with the two undescribed species from New Zealand and Australia. Hoare et al. classified the species in the family Batrachedridae following Ron Hodges' 1998 interpretation, as opposed to the Epimarptidae, because they considered more recent taxonomic developments as yet too immature, but this species might properly be placed in the Epimarptidae, or at least the subfamily Epimarptinae sensu Hodges, depending on the taxonomy used.

=== Etymology ===
Hoare et al. chose "Houdinia", referencing the renowned escape artist Harry Houdini, as generic epithet for humorous reasons – firstly, because the imago must 'escape' from the narrow chamber in which it pupates, and secondly, because it had 'escaped' the attention of entomologists until Watts first noticed it in 2003. The specific epithet "flexilissima", which is Latin for 'very flexible' (the superlative of flexilis), was chosen in reference to the caterpillars.

== Common name ==
Prior to its scientific description, Watts and Hoare took to calling the caterpillar of this species Fred the thread, which has been promoted as a common name by some websites. Dr Robert Hoare has written a poem about it.

== Description ==
Larva of H. flexilissima.

The larvae (caterpillars) of this species are extremely narrow, long and orange in colour. It reaches a length of approximately 2 cm but is only 1mm in width. The adult moth is approximately 0.5 cm in length and has a wingspan of 1.2 cm. It is silver-greyish in colour.

== Distribution ==
The species was first discovered by Watts in 2003 at a small bog called Torehape. As of 2006 it was known from only three peatland localities, and thus endemic to peat bogs in the region of Waikato, in the northern part of the North Island of New Zealand. Samples from areas where the plant once grew in central parts of the region of Northland have not been checked to find evidence of mining to indicate presence of the moth. The plant has been transplanted to three other locations in Waikato in restoration projects done between 2006 and 2008, and a fourth location was naturally colonised and regenerated near the type locality, Torehape, by 2013. The moth appears to be also present at these four areas, and seems to have been translocated along with its hostplant.

== Ecology ==
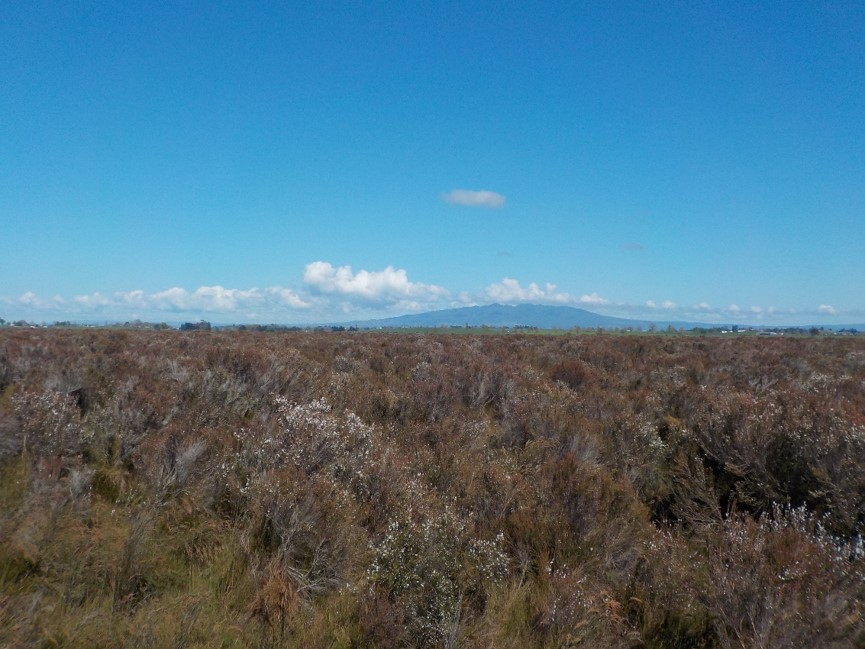
Prime Houdinia flexilissima habitat at the center of the Moanatuatua Scientific Reserve, looking out to Pirongia Mountain

=== Habitat ===
Its caterpillars feed on a plant which is restricted to relict areas of a type of habitat known as raised peat bogs. These once covered vastly more area than present, but have been drained and reduced for agriculture, or mined for fuel, after colonisation of the area. Of the areas where the plant formerly occurred, the moth has only been seen inland at central Waikato localities, not having been found in herbarium specimens of the plant taken from more coastal locations in Waikato and in the neighbouring northwestern Bay of Plenty region.

=== Life cycle ===
Adult moths are only on the wing from late Spring to mid-Summer, which, within the range of this species in the Southern Hemisphere, is late October to mid-December. H. flexilissima apparently has a two-year life cycle, because the moths emerge from their pupae whilst less mature caterpillar instars are still actively tunnelling.

=== Food plant ===
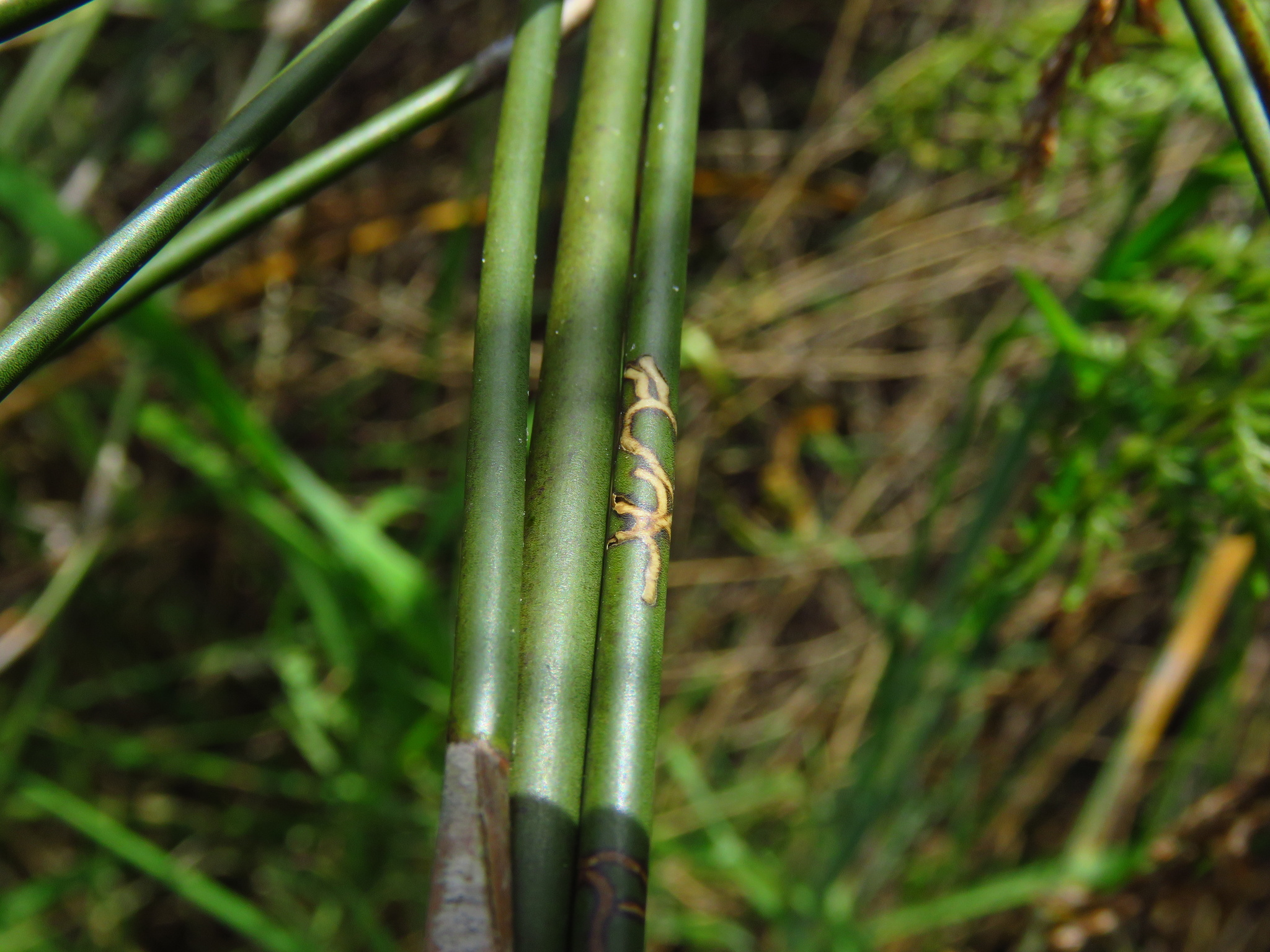
Evidence of feeding on Sporadanthus ferrugineus

This species is only known from a single host plant. The larvae mine and pupate inside the living stems of Sporadanthus ferrugineus, a large endemic New Zealand rush-like marsh plant.

=== Parasitoids ===
Jo A. Berry was able to recover and identify three hymenopteran ectoparasitoids which feed on the caterpillars (or perhaps a parasitoid of the caterpillar in hyperparasitoids): a Sierola species, a Diaulomorpha species and either an Aprostocetus or an Ootetrastichus species.

== Conservation ==
Because of its morphological distinctiveness, as well as threats to the habitat of its very local host plant S. ferrugineus, H. flexilissima is considered a species of high conservation status. In 2017 this moth was classified under the New Zealand Threat Classification system as being "At Risk, Relict".

It has been recorded as present in the protected area Moanatuatua Scientific Reserve, Waikato region, New Zealand.
