= Chedra fimbristyli =

Scientific classification
- Kingdom: Animalia
- Phylum: Arthropoda
- Clade: Pancrustacea
- Class: Insecta
- Order: Lepidoptera
- Family: Batrachedridae
- Genus: Chedra
- Species: C. fimbristyli

Binomial name
- Chedra fimbristyli Mey, 1993

Moth species in family Batrachedridae

Chedra fimbristyli is a moth in the family Batrachedridae. It was described by Wolfram Mey, in a paper published with Maria J. C. Ceniza in 1993. It is found on the Philippines.

The larvae have been recorded mining, with which is meant tunnelling within the tissues of the stems, an unknown Fimbristylis species, a large rush-like plant related to papyrus, known locally as tikog. The tikog has economic importance and is used locally to produce a fibre, and thus this tiny moth can be seen as a nuisance species, because it harms the plant.
