= Coleophora nielseni =

Scientific classification
- Kingdom: Animalia
- Phylum: Arthropoda
- Clade: Pancrustacea
- Class: Insecta
- Order: Lepidoptera
- Family: Coleophoridae
- Genus: Coleophora
- Species: C. nielseni

Binomial name
- Coleophora nielseni Baldizzone, 1996

Species of moth

Coleophora nielseni is a moth of the family Coleophoridae. It is found in southern Queensland, Australia.

The wingspan is about 11 mm (0.43 in).

== Etymology ==
The species is dedicated to Dr. Ebbe Schmidt Nielsen.
