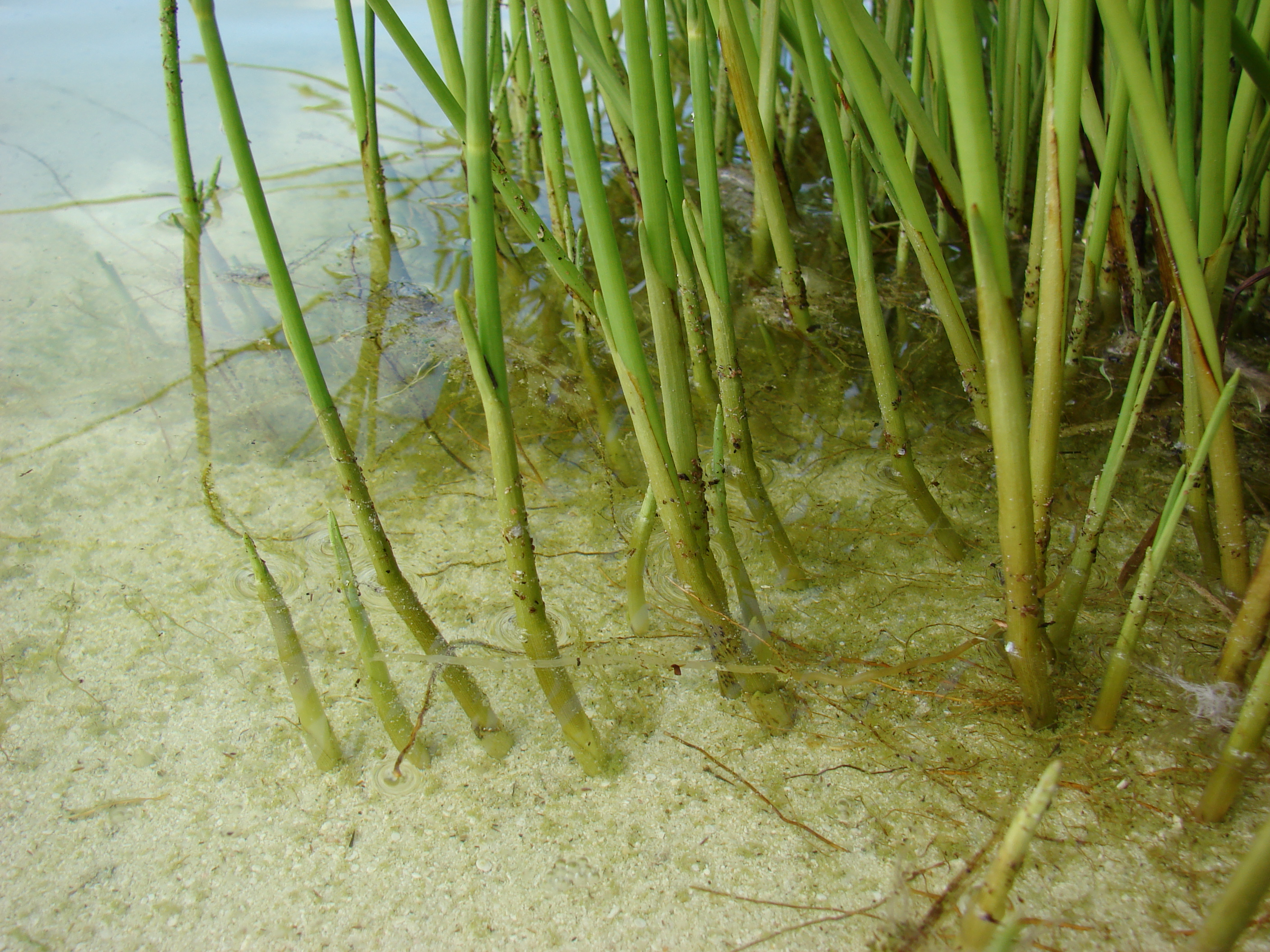

Conservation status
- Least Concern (IUCN 3.1)

Scientific classification
- Kingdom: Plantae
- Clade: Tracheophytes
- Clade: Angiosperms
- Clade: Monocots
- Clade: Commelinids
- Order: Poales
- Family: Cyperaceae
- Genus: Cyperus
- Species: C. laevigatus

Binomial name
- Cyperus laevigatus L.

= Cyperus laevigatus =

Smooth flatsedge

Species of plant

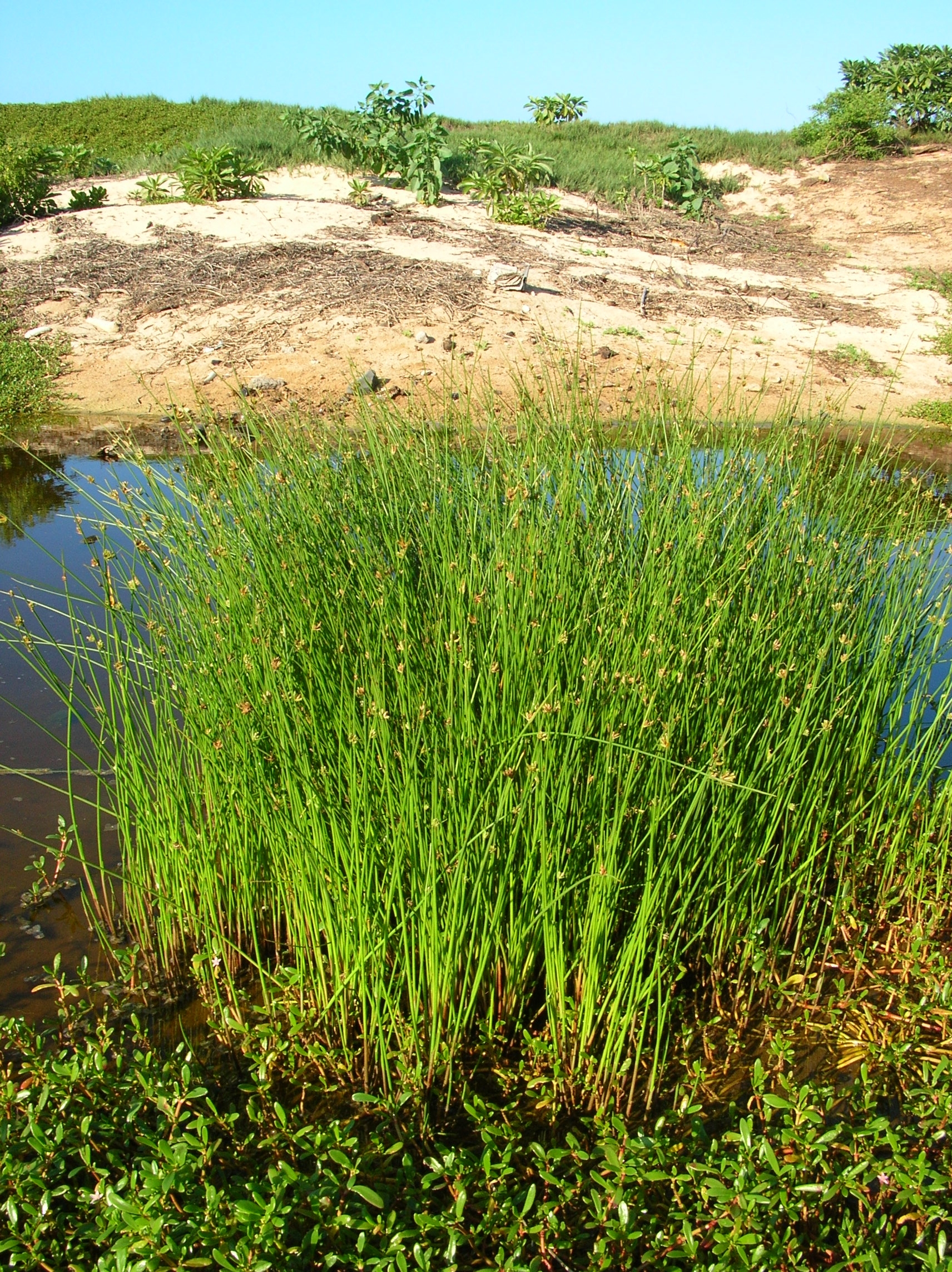
Cyperus laevigatus

Cyperus laevigatus is a species of sedge known by the common name smooth flatsedge.

== Distribution ==
Cyperus laevigatus is grows in wet areas, especially in brackish water, wet alkaline soils, mineral-rich hot springs, and other moist saline and alkaline habitat. It is widespread across tropical and subtropical regions of the Americas, Africa, the Mediterranean Basin, the Middle East, India, Central Asia, Australia and various oceanic islands.

== Description ==
Cyperus laevigatusis a perennial sedge growing up to 60 centimeters tall, sometimes in clumps interconnected on a horizontal rhizome. The inflorescence is a small array of cylindrical spikelets with one to three leaflike bracts at the base. The spikelets vary in color from green to reddish to dark brown.

== History ==
In Hawaiʻi, Cyperus laevigatus is known as makaloa and was used by the people of Ni'ihau to make beautiful plaited mats. Many of the finest examples of plaiting in Hawaiʻi are made from makaloa.

== Ecology ==
The caterpillars of the tiny moth Chedra microstigma have been found to mine within the leaves of this host plant in coastal marsh in Oahu.

== See also ==
- List of Cyperus species
