= Coleophora frustrata =

Scientific classification
- Kingdom: Animalia
- Phylum: Arthropoda
- Clade: Pancrustacea
- Class: Insecta
- Order: Lepidoptera
- Family: Coleophoridae
- Genus: Coleophora
- Species: C. frustrata

Binomial name
- Coleophora frustrata Baldizzone, 1996

Species of moth

Coleophora frustrata is a moth of the family Coleophoridae. It is found in southern tablelands of New South Wales, Australia.

The wingspan is about 8 mm (0.31 in).
