= Batrachedrodes ephelus =

Scientific classification
- Domain: Eukaryota
- Kingdom: Animalia
- Phylum: Arthropoda
- Class: Insecta
- Order: Lepidoptera
- Family: Momphidae
- Genus: Batrachedrodes
- Species: B. ephelus

Binomial name
- Batrachedrodes ephelus (Walsingham, 1907)

Synonyms
- Batrachedra ephelus Walsingham, 1907

Moth species in family Momphidae

Batrachedrodes ephelus is a moth of the family Momphidae. It was first described by Lord Walsingham in 1907 and is endemic to the Hawaiian island of Molokai.

The larvae probably feed on a fern species.
