= Wetlands of New Zealand =

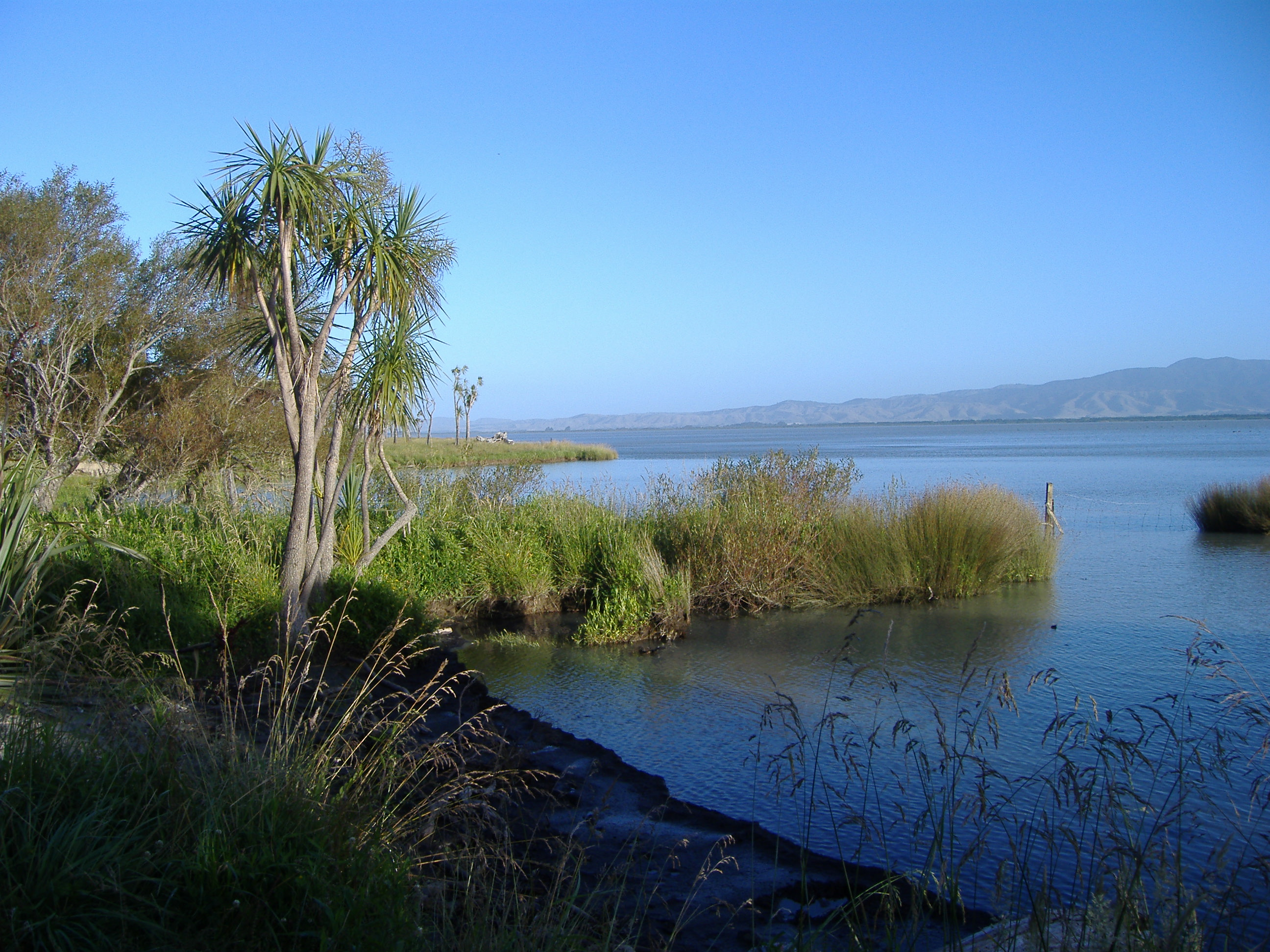
The shoreline of Wairarapa Moana Wetland.

New Zealand has several notable wetlands but 90% of wetland areas have been lost following European settlement.

The Resource Management Act 1991, the major Act of Parliament determining land use, defines wetlands as "permanently or intermittently wet areas, shallow water, and land water margins that support a natural ecosystem of plants and animals that area adapted to wet conditions". The Ramsar Convention, an international conservation agreement for wetlands to which New Zealand signed up to in 1971, has a wider definition of wetland.

Since the mid-19th century, New Zealand has lost about 90% of its wetland areas due to draining for farming. Many remaining wetlands are also degraded due to pollution, grazing, drainage and presence of invasive plants. In the late 20th and early 21st century, efforts have been made towards wetland conservation.

New Zealand wetlands are important for biodiversity and climate regulation. Even degraded wetlands provide essential habitats for threatened species and ecosystem services important for people, such as by reducing risks of flooding and fire events. Wetlands are at risk because of climate change and are also crucial to mitigating the impacts. Wetlands can shelter coastal communities from flooding and droughts as well as store carbon.

== Ramsar sites ==
The Department of Conservation currently administers seven Ramsar sites protected under the Ramsar Convention, covering an area of about 56,000 hectares (140,000 acres).

- Awarua Wetland
- Farewell Spit
- Firth of Thames
- Kopuatai Peat Dome
- Manawatu river mouth and estuary
- Wairarapa Moana Wetland
- Whangamarino Wetland

== Wetland wildlife ==
Plants such as clubmosses, horsetails, ferns, gymnosperms and angiosperms are considered indicators for wetland environments. A quarter of New Zealand birds use wetlands as a place to eat, rest as well as for migration. Some wetland birds, including waders, herons and rails, have morphological adaptations such as webbed feet, lobed toes and long legs suited for standing in water or soft substrate. Birds without these morphological adaptations (such as pigeons and swallows) are seen in wetland habitats as well.

Fish such as eels (Anguilla dieffenbachii and Anguilla australis) and whitebait (Galaxias spp. and Retropinna smelt) are commonly use wetlands to travel between freshwater and marine environments. Mudfish are also known to live in wetlands seasonally.

Various reptiles such as Northland green geckos, barking geckos and Alborn skins rely on wetland ecosystems. Other species such as spiders, crustaceans, water mites and molluscs are also supported by wetlands.

== Other wetlands ==
Other notable wetlands in New Zealand include Ahukawakawa Swamp, Aramoana, the Kepler Mire, Kai Iwi Lakes, the Mangarakau Wetland, the Sinclair Wetlands, and Te Henga, as well as areas around the lower reaches of the Waikato River.

The Rakatu Wetlands in the South Island are part of an ecological restoration project set up address the environmental effects of the construction of the Manapouri Power Station.

Travis Wetland is a restoration project covering 116 hectares (290 acres) of land in urban Christchurch.

== See also ==
- Water in New Zealand
- Environment of New Zealand
