= Ampulla (disambiguation) =

An ampulla (plural "ampullae") was, in Ancient Rome, a "small nearly globular flask or bottle, with two handles" (OED).

Ampulla may also refer to:

== Antique vessels ==
- Monza ampullae, 6th century, metal souvenirs of pilgrimages to the Holy Land.
- Holy Ampulla, glass, part of the French coronation regalia and believed to have divine origins.
- The Ampulla in the British Crown Jewels, a hollow, gold, eagle-shaped vessel from which the anointing oil is poured at the coronation of the British monarch.

== Medicine and science ==
- Any of several anatomical structures:
  - Ampullae of Lorenzini, electroreceptors in fish
  - Ampulla of semicircular canal (osseous ampulla), dilated portion at the end of the semicircular canals in the inner ear) within which the ampullar cristae and cupula can be found
  - Ampulla of uterine tube (ampulla tubae uterinae)
  - Ampulla of vas deferens or ampulla of ductus deferens (ampulla vas deferentis or ampulla ductus deferentis)
  - Cisterna chyli (ampulla chyli), dilated sac at the lower end of the thoracic duct
  - Duodenal ampulla or duodenal cap (ampulla duodeni), the very first part of the duodenum, which is not retroperitoneal
  - Hepatopancreatic ampulla, also called ampulla of Vater
  - Rectal ampulla (ampulla recti)
- Ampullae, bulb-like structures above the tube feet in echinoderms, and part of the valvae in arthropod male genitals
- Ampulla (gastropod), a genus of sea snails
