= Hermann von Heinemann =

German entomologist

Hermann von Heinemann (1 March 1812 in Helmstedt – 18 December 1871 in Braunschweig) was a German entomologist who specialised initially in Coleoptera and later in Lepidoptera.

Heinemann was a customs inspector. He wrote Die Schmetterlinge Deutschlands und der Schweiz (1859–1877) published in Braunschweig. In English the title is "Butterflies of Germany and Switzerland". It was completed by Maximilian Ferdinand Wocke. The second volume on microlepidoptera was especially important.

Heinemann's collection of microlepidoptera is in the Lower Saxony State Museum (Niedersachsisches Landesmuseum) Hannover.
