= Maximilian Ferdinand Wocke =

German entomologist

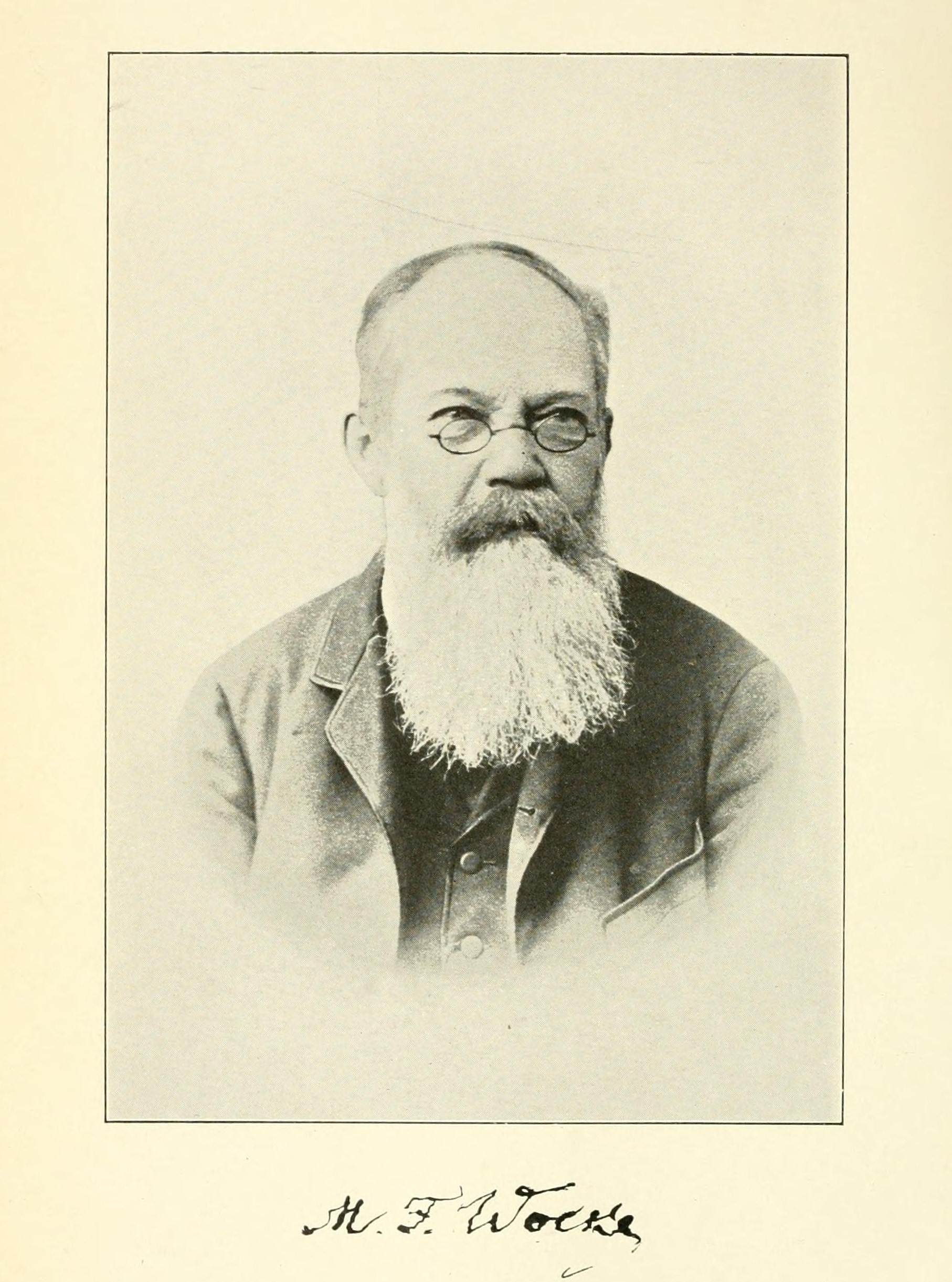
Maximilian Ferdinand Wocke

Maximilian Ferdinand Wocke (27 November 1820, Breslau – 7 November 1906) was a German entomologist, specialising in Lepidoptera. He was an apothecary and physician.

== Selected works ==
- with Otto Staudinger(1861) Catalog der Lepidopteren Europa's und der angrenzenden Länder. Dresden (Staudinger & Burdach). XVI + 192 pp.
- with Otto Staudinger(1871) Catalog der Lepidopteren des Europaeischen Faunengebiets. Dresden (Burdach). XXXVII + 426 pp.online
