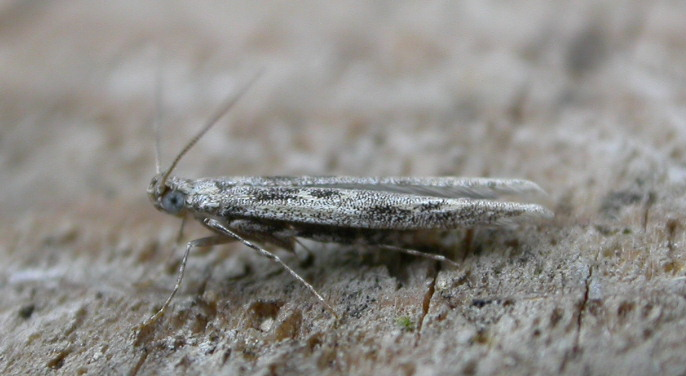

Scientific classification
- Kingdom: Animalia
- Phylum: Arthropoda
- Clade: Pancrustacea
- Class: Insecta
- Order: Lepidoptera
- Infraorder: Heteroneura
- Clade: Eulepidoptera
- Clade: Ditrysia
- Clade: Apoditrysia
- Superfamily: Gelechioidea
- Family: Batrachedridae; Heinemann & Wocke, 1876

Synonyms
- Batrachedrinae

= Batrachedridae =

Family of moths

The Batrachedridae are a small family of tiny moths. These are small, slender moths which rest with their wings wrapped tightly around their bodies.

== Taxonomy ==
The taxonomy of this and related groups is often disputed.

This group was first proposed as a taxonomic rank in 1876 by Hermann von Heinemann and Maximilian Ferdinand Wocke under the name Batrachedrae. Lord Walsingham used the name Batrachedridae in 1890.

Ron Hodges decided to separate a number of new species he was describing in 1966 from Batrachedra in his new genus Chedra, on the basis of the adult males possessing a "single, strong, apical spine on the ampulla" (also known as the harpe). Chedra then accommodated three species: two from North America and one from Chile. Hodges furthermore described two more related genera in this paper: Duospina and Ifeda. These genera he all placed in the family Gelechioidea.

In his 1978 treatment of the microlepidoptera of Hawaii, Elwood Zimmerman classified this group as a new subfamily of the family Gelechiidae, which he coined the Momphinae. Zimmerman split five local species from the genus Batrachedra to a new genus Batrachedrodes on the basis of morphology and the particular habit of feeding among sporangia on the underside of fern fronds.

That same year, however, Hodges classified Batrachedra, Chedra, Duospina and Ifeda in the family Batrachedridae in The moths of America north of Mexico. Hodges changed the classification in his 1983 Check List of the Lepidoptera of America North of Mexico and included the group as the subfamily Batrachedrinae of the family Coleophoridae.

Meanwhile, in Italy, the microlepidopterist Giorgio Baldizzone published an account of the Coleophoridae of Australia in 1996, in which he removed the genus Corythangela from that family to the Batrachedridae sensu Hodges 1978, apparently not having read or not following Hodges 1983 yet, upon examining the genitalia of the two species then known from the territory and finding them more similar to those of other Batrachedridae.

In 1999 Hodges reclassified it again as the family Batrachedridae. He also reclassified the family Epimarptidae as the subfamily Epimarptinae of this family, based on a number of shared synapomorphies. The Batrachedrinae sensu stricto he then reclassified as the subfamily Batrachedrinae. At the time Hodges considered the subfamily Batrachedrinae to include more than 100 species in five genera worldwide.

In Japan Yutaka Arita had been investigating a mysterious moth for a number of decades, but had been unable to identify it. He eventually got in touch with Kazuhiro Sugisima, and together with help of others, they were able to identify it and describe it as a new species of Idioglossa in 2000. Upon closer examination of the genitals of it and other species Sugisima transferred the genus, according to the key in Hodges' 1999 reclassification of the group, in the subfamily Batrachedrinae of the family Batrachedridae. After this, Koster & Sinev's 2003 book "Microlepidoptera of Europe" recognised Hodges' subfamily Batrachedrinae at the rank of family again, but were unclear about Epimarptis (which doesn't occur in Europe, as far as known).

In 2004 Lauri Kaila investigated the phylogeny of the superfamily Gelechioidea, using morphological traits. In the resultant analyses, the family Batrachedridae was paraphyletic as the family Coleophoridae sensu stricto was nested on the Batrachedridae. Kaila used an undescribed species from Australia provisionally called "Batrachedra eustola" in the analyses. This taxon specifically led to the finding of Batrachedridae as paraphyletic. Another issue was concerning the genus Epimarptis. At the time, the few old specimens which existed in London had never been properly examined, and none knowingly collected since. As such, most of the traits used as in the character analyses of Kaila were unknown. The resultant publication proposed classifying the traditional family Coleophoridae along with the subfamilies Batrachedrinae, Stathmopodinae and Coelopoetinae, in a newly circumscribed family Coleophoridae sensu lato. Inclusion of the genus Epimarptis in his analysis showed it belonged within his Coleophoridae sensu lato, but that including it caused a collapse of resolution in the basal clades of this provisional family. Kaila states that he is not formally revising Hodges' classification in this paper, merely suggesting a new classification.

Later in 2004, Sugisima stated that, after examining the specimens of the new Japanese species of Epimarptis he had just recognised, and new photographs of the specimens in London, and filling out some of the numerous until then unknown morphological characteristics of this obscure genus, it was not possible for him to agree with Kaila's analysis wholeheartedly, because in some characteristics Epimarptis fell outside even Coleophoridae sensu lato. Sugisima also mentions he finds the synapomorphies used by Hodges to define this latter family and its subfamilies in 1999 invalid in light of the further morphological observations made by him and Kaila, finding only one synapomorphy verifiable.

In 2006, Batrachedridae was expanded with addition of the monotypic genus Houdinia Hoare, Dugdale & Watts, 2006, with the single species Houdinia flexilissima from New Zealand. In the description, Hoare et al. (2006) state that their new species appears morphologically closest to the then recently described Epimarptis hiranoi Sugisima, 2004 of Japan, and because Kaila does not formally revise the taxonomy in his 2004 paper, they are classifying the species according to the taxonomy published by Hodges in 1999.

In van Nieukerken et al., 2011 (the section on Lepidoptera, part of Zhang's (2011) attempt to summarise all known animals), the authors were aware of Hodges' 1999 work but chose to repudiate it, and re-recognised Epimarptidae as a family again. Four species in the genus Epimarptis were counted as belonging to this family. In their taxonomic interpretation, the family Batrachedridae was circumscribed by Heinemann & Wocke in 1876, and comprised 99 species in 10 genera. Subsequently, a phylogenetic analysis by Heikkilä et al. 2014 repudiated this interpretation and again synonymised Epimarptidae with Batrachedridae. They furthermore removed the genera Homaledra and Houdinia from the family, and moved both to the Pterolonchidae. More recently, a study by Wang & Li, 2020 again proposed restoration of Epimarptidae as a distinct valid family, then comprising Epimarptis Meyrick, 1914, plus a second genus Idioglossa Walsingham, 1881.

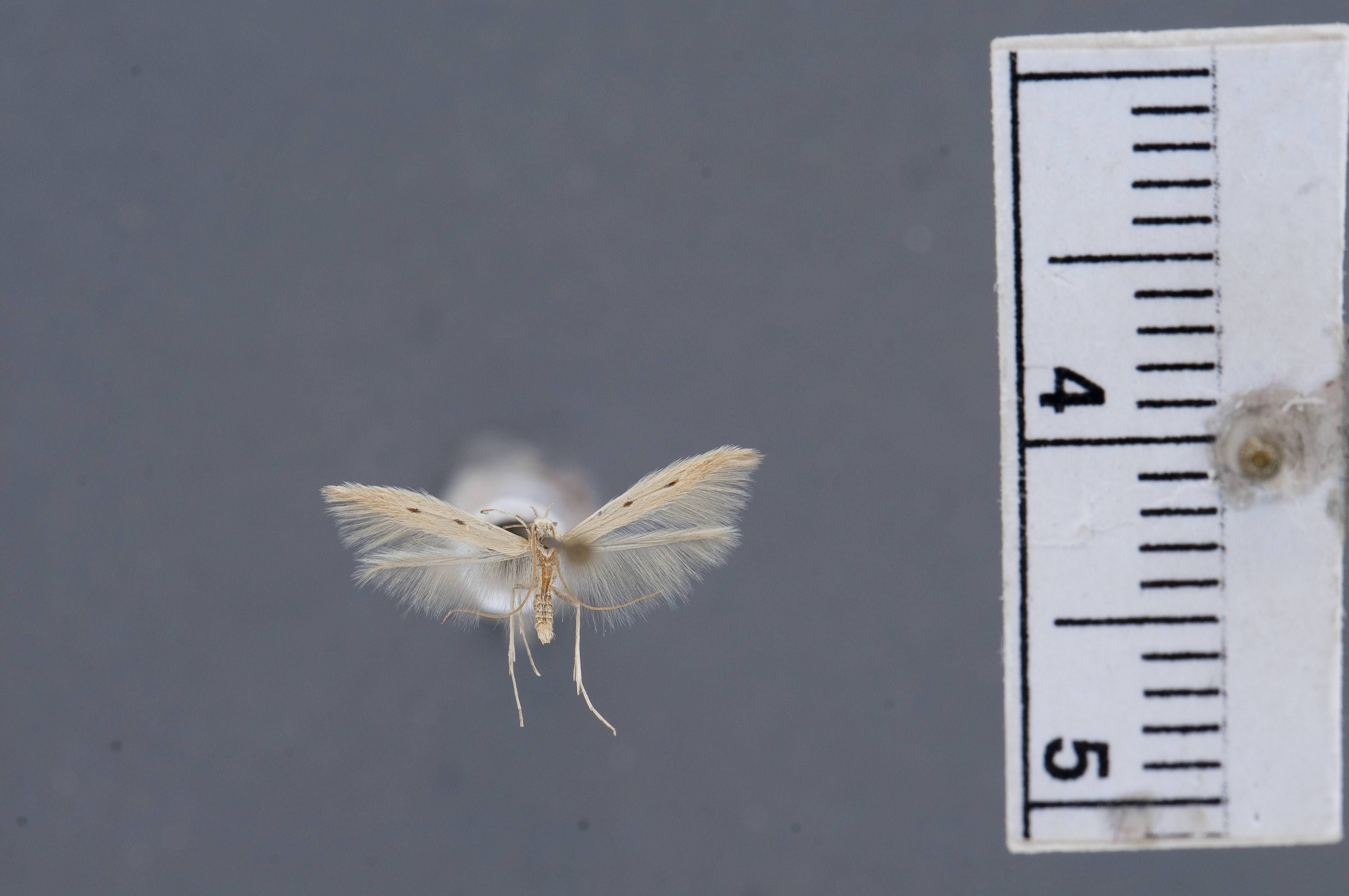
holotype of Chedra pensor from Arizona.

== Subfamilies ==
In 1999, Hodges advocated for two subfamilies:

- Epimarptinae (Meyrick, 1914) - Monotypic, Hodges included only Epimarptis, but subsequently treated as a distinct family Epimarptidae
- Batrachedrinae (Heinemann & Wocke, 1876) - Hodges included five genera: Batrachedra, Chedra, Duospina, Homaledra (but moved out in 2014) and Ifeda. Additionally, Idioglossa was moved to this subfamily in 2000, but subsequently as Epimarptidae. Homaledra

Also: Corythangela and Houdinia were placed in Batrachedridae, but never classified to subfamily. Houdinia was moved out of the family in 2014.

== Genera ==
These genera have at one point been assigned to the family:

- Batrachedra Herrich-Schäffer, 1853
- Batrachedrodes Zimmerman, 1978
- Chedra Hodges, 1966
- Corythangela Meyrick, 1897
- Duospina Hodges, 1966
- Enscepastra Meyrick, 1920
- Homaledra Busck, 1900
- Houdinia Hoare, Dugdale & Watts, 2006
- Ifeda Hodges, 1966

See instead under Epimarptidae for:

- Epimarptis Meyrick, 1914
- Idioglossa Walsingham, 1881

== Distribution and diversity ==
A total of over a hundred species of Batrachedra are found on every continent except Antarctica, including a number of Pacific islands, although there are only three species that occur in Europe. The genus Batrachedrodes, with six species, is endemic to the Hawaiian Islands. Six Chedra species have been found, scattered over the US, Chile, Hawaii and the Philippines. Three species of Epimarptis have been found scattered across the Indian subcontinent, another was found in Japan. Eight Idioglossa species been found, one to two species on each continent, except five species in Asia, and none in Europe, South America and Antarctica.

North America contains at least six genera.

Australia contains three genera, two species of Corythangela and twenty-nine of Batrachedra, as well as a number of undescribed species and one species of Idioglossa.

The Hawaiian Islands contain two genera with eight species, six of Batrachedrodes, and two of Chedra.

Europe only has three species of Batrachedra.
