= List of moths of Australia (Batrachedridae) =

Partial list of Australian moths

This is a list of the Australian species of the family Batrachedridae. It also acts as an index to the species articles and forms part of the full List of moths of Australia.

- Batrachedra arenosella (Walker, 1864)
- Batrachedra astathma Meyrick, 1897
- Batrachedra capnospila Lower, 1899
- Batrachedra diplosema Meyrick, 1897
- Batrachedra ditrota Meyrick, 1897
- Batrachedra epixantha Meyrick, 1897
- Batrachedra eremochtha Meyrick, 1897
- Batrachedra eurema Bradley, 1956
- Batrachedra eustola Meyrick, 1897
- Batrachedra helarcha Meyrick, 1897
- Batrachedra holochlora Meyrick, 1897
- Batrachedra hypachroa Meyrick, 1897
- Batrachedra hypoxutha Meyrick, 1897
- Batrachedra leucophyta Meyrick, 1897
- Batrachedra liopis Meyrick, 1897
- Batrachedra lygropis Herrich-Schäffer, 1853
- Batrachedra megalodoxa Meyrick, 1897
- Batrachedra metaxias Meyrick, 1897
- Batrachedra microdryas Turner, 1923
- Batrachedra microtoma Meyrick, 1897
- Batrachedra mylephata Meyrick, 1897
- Batrachedra notocapna Turner, 1939
- Batrachedra phorcydia Meyrick, 1897
- Batrachedra plagiocentra Meyrick, 1897
- Batrachedra salina Meyrick, 1921
- Batrachedra satirica Meyrick, 1917
- Batrachedra silignea Turner, 1923
- Batrachedra sterilis Meyrick, 1897
- Batrachedra trimeris Meyrick, 1897
- Batrachedra velox Meyrick, 1897
- Batrachedra volucris Meyrick, 1897
- Batrachedra zonochra Lower, 1904
