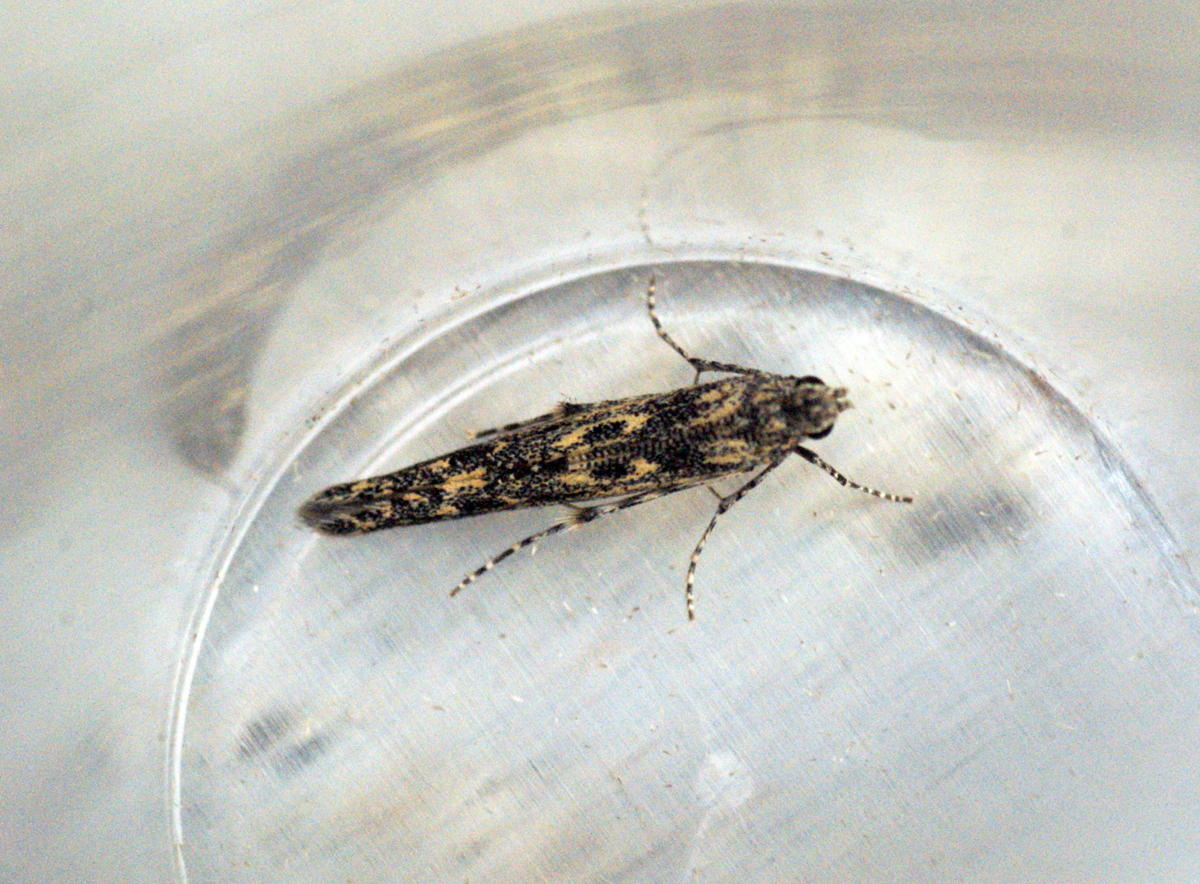
- Batrachedra praeangusta

Scientific classification
- Kingdom: Animalia
- Phylum: Arthropoda
- Clade: Pancrustacea
- Class: Insecta
- Order: Lepidoptera
- Family: Batrachedridae
- Genus: Batrachedra; Herrich-Schäffer, 1853

Species
- See text

Synonyms
- Eustaintonia Spuler, 1910

= Batrachedra =

Moth genus in family Batrachedridae

Batrachedra is the largest genus in the moth family Batrachedridae, with representatives all over the world. The early stages of most species are unknown. The genus name is derived from the Greek words batrachos, 'frog', and edra, 'seat', referring to the frog-like resting posture of the adult moths. As of 2018 at least some 114 species are known to belong to the genus.

The genus was first described in 1853 by Gottlieb August Wilhelm Herrich-Schäffer.

== Distribution ==
There are only three species found in Europe. There is especially high biodiversity in the Indomalayan realm.

== Ecology ==
Little is known about the ecology for most species, but for those for which it is known, the caterpillars across the genus use a large variety of host plants. At least two mine within pine or spruce needles, one is found respectively on Cyperaceae, Juncaceae, Salix and Populus, one is a pest of pineapples, another a pest of Agave, one feeds on the fruit of Smilax china and another on types of palms from Brazil.

== Species ==
The genus contains the following species:

- Batrachedra acrodeta Meyrick, 1927 (from Samoa)
- Batrachedra agaura Meyrick, 1901 (from New Zealand)
- Batrachedra albicapitella Sinev, 1986 (from the Koreas, Japan, south of far eastern Siberia)
- Batrachedra amydraula Meyrick, 1916 (from India, UAE)
- Batrachedra angusta Turati, 1930 (from northernmost Africa)
- Batrachedra aphypnota (Meyrick, 1917) (from Sri Lanka)
- Batrachedra arenosella (Walker, 1864) (widespread, New Zealand, Australia, etc.)
- Batrachedra astathma Meyrick, 1897 (from Australia)
- Batrachedra astricta Philpott, 1930 (from New Zealand)
- Batrachedra atomosella Walsingham, 1900 (from Socotra)
- Batrachedra atriloqua Meyrick, 1931 (from Fiji)
- Batrachedra auricomella Sinev, 1993 (from Primorsky Krai)
- Batrachedra busiris Hodges, 1966 (from Florida in the USA)
- Batrachedra calator Hodges, 1966 (from Mexico)
- Batrachedra capnospila Lower, 1899 (from New South Wales in Australia)
- Batrachedra chasanella Sinev, 1993 (from Primorsky Krai)
- Batrachedra comosae Hodges, 1966 (from Puerto Rico)
- Batrachedra concitata Meyrick, 1928 (from Texas, New Mexico)
- Batrachedra conspersa Meyrick, 1916 (from Ecuador)
- Batrachedra copia Clarke, 1957 (from Mexico)
- Batrachedra daduchus Hodges, 1966 (from Jamaica)
- Batrachedra decoctor Hodges, 1966 (from Florida and Bermuda)
- Batrachedra diplosema Meyrick, 1897 (from Queensland in Australia)
- Batrachedra ditrota Meyrick, 1897 (from Australia)
- Batrachedra dolichoscia Meyrick, 1928 (Neotropical)
- Batrachedra elucus Hodges, 1966 (Arizona)
- Batrachedra enormis Meyrick, 1928 (Neotropical)
- Batrachedra epimyxa Meyrick, 1916 (India)
- Batrachedra epixantha Meyrick, 1917 (from Australia)
- Batrachedra epombra Meyrick, 1914 (from Africa)
- Batrachedra eremochtha (from Australia)
- Batrachedra eucola Meyrick, 1889 (New Zealand)
- Batrachedra eurema Bradley, 1956 (from Guadalcanal, Lord Howe Island)
- Batrachedra eustola Meyrick, 1889 (Australia)
- Batrachedra filicicola Meyrick, 1917 (New Zealand)
- Batrachedra folia Hodges, 1966 (Arizona)
- Batrachedra garritor Hodges, 1966 (Arizona)
- Batrachedra granosa Meyrick, 1911 (from Namibia, South Africa)
- Batrachedra hageter Hodges, 1966 (California)
- Batrachedra helarcha (from Australia)
- Batrachedra heliota Meyrick, 1913 (from South Africa)
- Batrachedra holochlora (from Australia)
- Batrachedra hypachroa (from Australia)
- Batrachedra hypoleuca
- Batrachedra hypoxutha
- Batrachedra illusor
- Batrachedra isochtha Meyrick, 1914 (from Congo, Uganda, South Africa)
- Batrachedra knabi (Walsingham, 1909) (Neotropical)
- Batrachedra leucophyta (from Australia)
- Batrachedra libator
- Batrachedra linaria
- Batrachedra liopsis (from Australia)
- Batrachedra litterata
- Batrachedra lygropis (from Australia)
- Batrachedra macroloncha
- Batrachedra mathesoni
- Batrachedra meator Hodges, 1966 (Neotropical)
- Batrachedra megalodoxa (from Australia)
- Batrachedra metaxias (from Australia)
- Batrachedra microbias Meyrick, 1914 (from South Africa)
- Batrachedra microdryas (from Australia)
- Batrachedra microtoma (from Australia)
- Batrachedra mictopsamma
- Batrachedra monophthalma
- Batrachedra mylephata (from Australia)
- Batrachedra myrmecophila
- Batrachedra notocapna (from Australia)
- Batrachedra nuciferae Hodges, 1966 (Neotropical)
- Batrachedra ochricomella Sinev, 1993 (Russia)
- Batrachedra oemias Meyrick, 1909 (from South Africa)
- Batrachedra orinarcha Meyrick, 1917 (India)
- Batrachedra pacabilis Meyrick, 1922
- Batrachedra pachybela Meyrick, 1934 (from Sudan)
- Batrachedra paritor Hodges, 1966 (Neotropical)
- Batrachedra parvulipunctella Chrétien, 1915 (from Europe)
- Batrachedra pastor Meyrick, 1936 (Taiwan)
- Batrachedra peroptusa Meyrick, 1922 (Neotropical)
- Batrachedra phaneropa Meyrick, 1914 (from Malawi)
- Batrachedra phorcydia (from Australia)
- Batrachedra pinicolella (Zeller, 1839) (from Europe, Palearctic)
- Batrachedra plagiocentra (from Australia)
- Batrachedra praeangusta (Haworth, 1828) (from Europe, Palearctic)
- Batrachedra promylaea Meyrick, 1917 (India)
- Batrachedra psithyra Meyrick, 1922 (New Zealand)
- Batrachedra rainha Bippus, 2020
- Batrachedra repertor Hodges, 1966 (Neotropical)
- Batrachedra rhysodes
- Batrachedra rixator Hodges, 1966 (Neotropical)
- Batrachedra sacrata Meyrick, 1921 (India)
- Batrachedra salicipomenella
- Batrachedra salina Meyrick, 1921 (from Australia)
- Batrachedra satirica Meyrick, 1917 (from Australia)
- Batrachedra saurota Meyrick, 1911 (from South Africa)
- Batrachedra scapulata Meyrick, 1917 (Sri Lanka)
- Batrachedra scitator
- Batrachedra siliginea (from Australia)
- Batrachedra smilacis Sugisima, 2006
- Batrachedra stenosema Lower, 1904
- Batrachedra sterilis Meyrick, 1897 (from Australia)
- Batrachedra striolata
- Batrachedra subglauca Sinev, 1979 (Russia)
- Batrachedra substrata Meyrick, 1916 (Sri Lanka)
- Batrachedra tarsimaculata Walsingham, 1897 (West Indies)
- Batrachedra testor Hodges, 1966 (Florida)
- Batrachedra theca Clarke, 1957 (Neotropical)
- Batrachedra trimeris Meyrick, 1897 (from Australia)
- Batrachedra tristicta Meyrick, 1901 (New Zealand)
- Batrachedra velox Meyrick, 1897 (from Australia)
- Batrachedra verax Meyrick, 1917 (Sri Lanka)
- Batrachedra volucris (from Australia)
- Batrachedra xanthocrena Meyrick, 1917 (India)
- Batrachedra zenochroa Lower, 1904 (from Australia)

== Selected former species ==
- Batrachedra albanica
- Batrachedra albistrigella
- Batrachedra bedelliella
- Batrachedra bermudensis
- Batrachedra clemensella
- Batrachedra concors
- Batrachedra crypsineura
- Batrachedra cuniculata
- Batrachedra curvilineella
- Batrachedra ephelus
- Batrachedra halans
- Batrachedra hologramma
- Batrachedra kabulella
- Batrachedra ledereriella (Zeller, 1850) (from southern Europe, Canary Islands, Morocco)
- Batrachedra lomentella
- Batrachedra microstigma
- Batrachedra peroptusa Meyrick, 1922 (Neotropical)
- Batrachedra phragmitidella
- Batrachedra praeangustella
- Batrachedra psilopa
- Batrachedra pulvella
- Batrachedra ruficiliata
- Batrachedra silvatica
- Batrachedra sophroniella
- Batrachedra stegodyphobius
- Batrachedra supercincta
- Batrachedra turdipennella
- Batrachedra unifasciella
