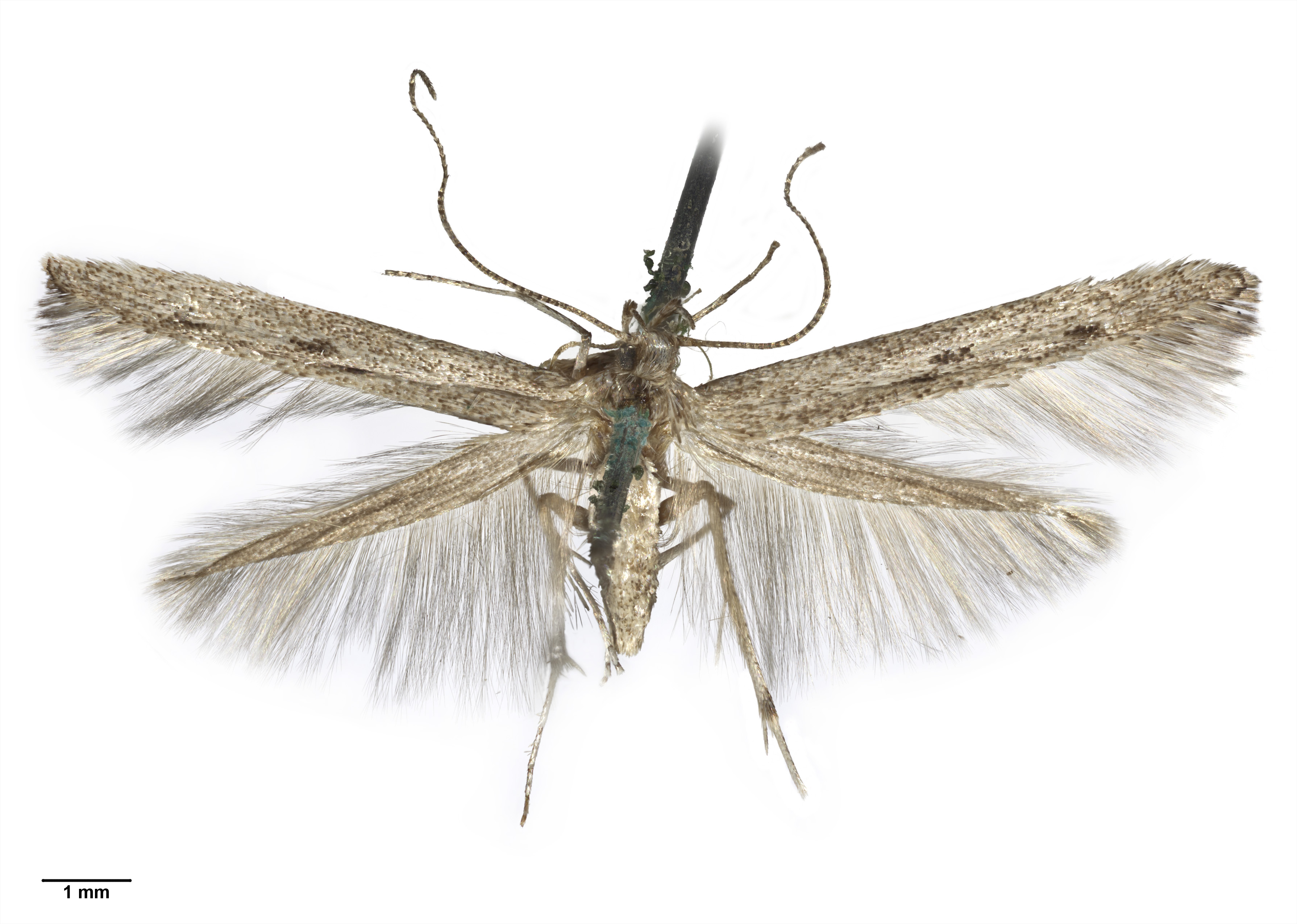
- Male holotype specimen

Scientific classification
- Kingdom: Animalia
- Phylum: Arthropoda
- Clade: Pancrustacea
- Class: Insecta
- Order: Lepidoptera
- Family: Batrachedridae
- Genus: Batrachedra
- Species: B. astricta

Binomial name
- Batrachedra astricta Philpott, 1930

= Batrachedra astricta =

Moth species in family Batrachedridae

Batrachedra astricta is a species of moth in the family Batrachedridae. It is endemic to New Zealand. It is found in the north of the North Island and also Opoho in Otago. This species is on the wing in December. B. astricta has been found in wetland habitat. It has been shown to be associated with the threatened plant Sporadanthus ferrugineus.

== Taxonomy ==
This species was first described by Alfred Philpott in 1930. George Hudson discussed and illustrated this species in his 1939 book A supplement to the butterflies and moths of New Zealand. The holotype specimen of this species was collected by Charles E. Clarke on 17 December 1921 at Opoho in Otago. The holotype specimen is held at the Auckland War Memorial Museum.

== Description ==
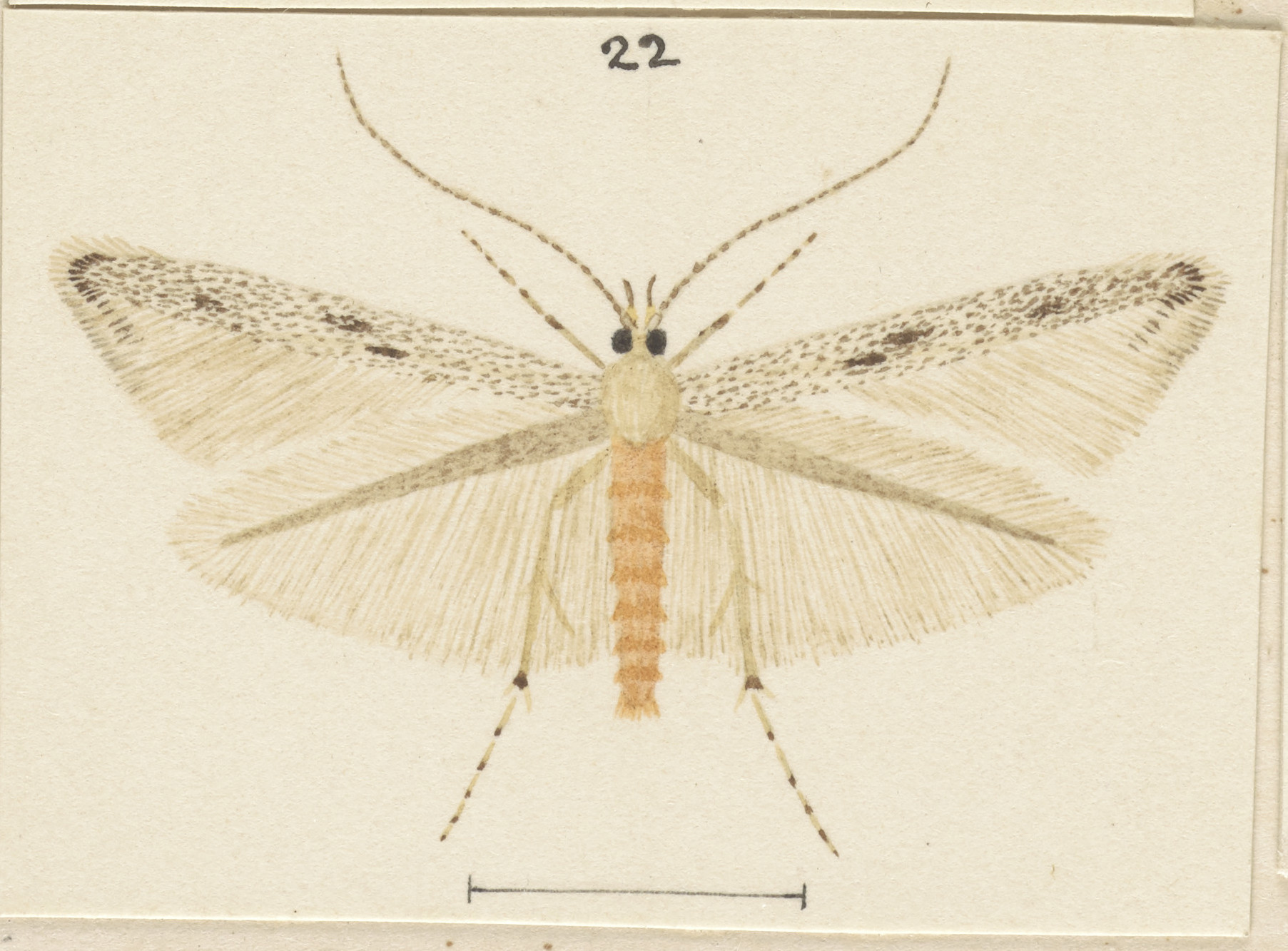
B. astricta illustrated by George Hudson

Philpott described B. astricta as follows:

♂♀. 13-15mm Head and thorax whitish grey. Palpi whitish grey mixed with fuscous, second segment with small apical scale-projection. Antennae ochreous annulated with fuscous. Abdomen greyish brown. Legs whitish ochreous mixed with fuscous. Forewings long, narrow, parallel-sided, apex round-pointed; white, densely sprinkled with blackish fuscous scales, aggregations of which form the stigmata; first discal at about 1/2, obliquely beyond pical; second discal at 3/4, rather below middle : fringes pale fuscous grey with a blackish fuscous line round apex. Hindwings and fringes page greyish fuscous.

This species can be distinguished from its close relative B. tristicata as B. astricta lacks the round black apical spot found on the forewings of that species as well as lacking the elongated stigmata.

== Distribution ==
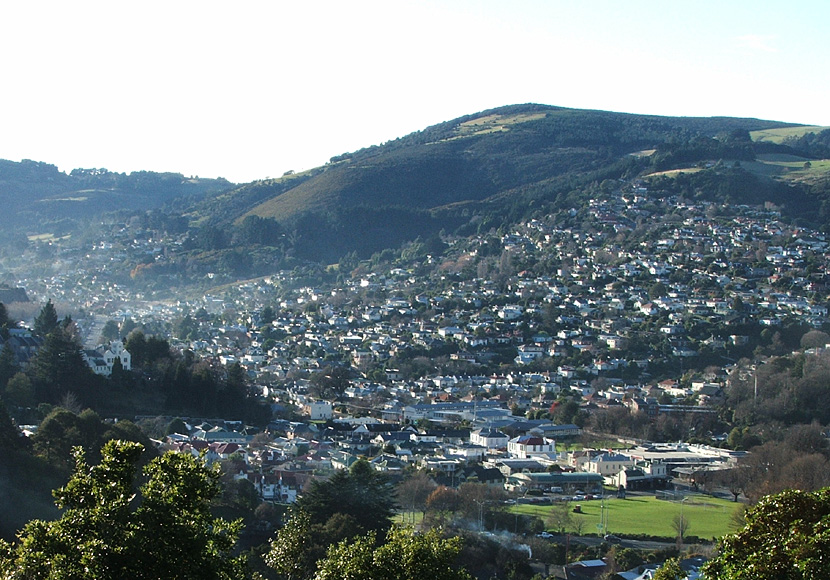
Image showing Opoho in the background.

This species is endemic to New Zealand. Other than the type locality of Opoho, this species has also been collected in the northern part of the North Island.

== Biology and behaviour ==
Sporadanthus ferrugineus.

This species is on the wing in December. It has been shown to be associated with the threatened plant Sporadanthus ferrugineus. B. astricta has been found in wetland habitat.
