= Batrachedra parvulipunctella =

Scientific classification
- Kingdom: Animalia
- Phylum: Arthropoda
- Class: Insecta
- Order: Lepidoptera
- Family: Batrachedridae
- Genus: Batrachedra
- Species: B. parvulipunctella

Binomial name
- Batrachedra parvulipunctella Chrétien, 1915

Synonyms
- Eustaintonia phragmitidella Mariani, 1936

Species of moth

Batrachedra parvulipunctella is a species of moth of the family Batrachedridae. It is found in southern Europe and North Africa.

Adults are on wing from May to June and again from July to September in two generations per year.
