= Batrachedra enormis =

Scientific classification
- Kingdom: Animalia
- Phylum: Arthropoda
- Class: Insecta
- Order: Lepidoptera
- Family: Batrachedridae
- Genus: Batrachedra
- Species: B. enormis

Binomial name
- Batrachedra enormis Meyrick, 1928

Moth species in family Batrachedridae

Batrachedra enormis, the large batrachedra moth, is a moth in the family Batrachedridae. It is found in Mexico and the southern United States, where it has been recorded from Alabama, Arizona, California, Louisiana, New Mexico and South Carolina.

The wingspan is 28 mm. Adults have been recorded on wing in April, June and from August to October.
