= Batrachedra hypoleuca =

Scientific classification
- Kingdom: Animalia
- Phylum: Arthropoda
- Class: Insecta
- Order: Lepidoptera
- Family: Batrachedridae
- Genus: Batrachedra
- Species: B. hypoleuca

Binomial name
- Batrachedra hypoleuca Lower, 1904

Moth species in family Batrachedridae

Batrachedra hypoleuca is a moth in the family Batrachedridae. It is found in Australia (including New South Wales).
