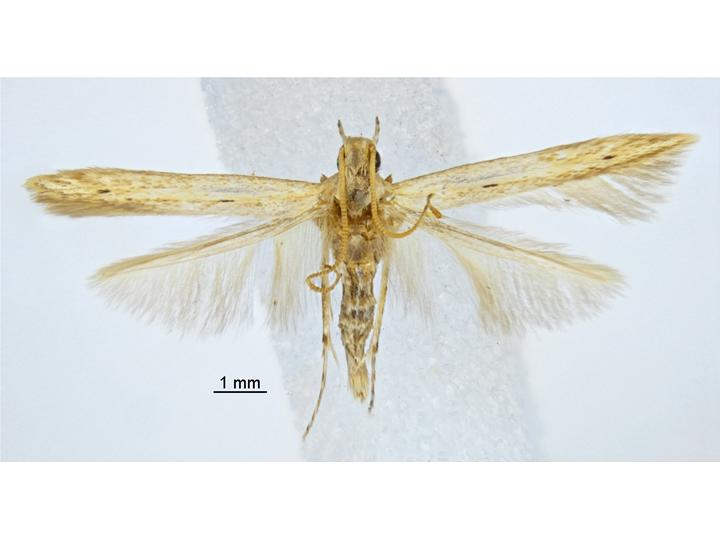

Scientific classification
- Kingdom: Animalia
- Phylum: Arthropoda
- Class: Insecta
- Order: Lepidoptera
- Family: Batrachedridae
- Genus: Batrachedra
- Species: B. monophthalma

Binomial name
- Batrachedra monophthalma Clarke, 1971

= Batrachedra monophthalma =

Moth species in family Batrachedridae

Batrachedra monophthalma is a moth in the family Batrachedridae. It is found on Rapa Island.
