= Batrachedra pachybela =

Scientific classification
- Kingdom: Animalia
- Phylum: Arthropoda
- Class: Insecta
- Order: Lepidoptera
- Family: Batrachedridae
- Genus: Batrachedra
- Species: B. pachybela

Binomial name
- Batrachedra pachybela Meyrick, 1934

Moth species in family Batrachedridae

Batrachedra pachybela is a moth in the family Batrachedridae. It is found in Sudan.
