= Batrachedra atriloqua =

Scientific classification
- Kingdom: Animalia
- Phylum: Arthropoda
- Class: Insecta
- Order: Lepidoptera
- Family: Batrachedridae
- Genus: Batrachedra
- Species: B. atriloqua

Binomial name
- Batrachedra atriloqua Meyrick, 1931

Moth species in family Batrachedridae

Batrachedra atriloqua is a moth in the family Batrachedridae. It is found on Fiji. The larvae have been recorded feeding on Cocos nucifera.
