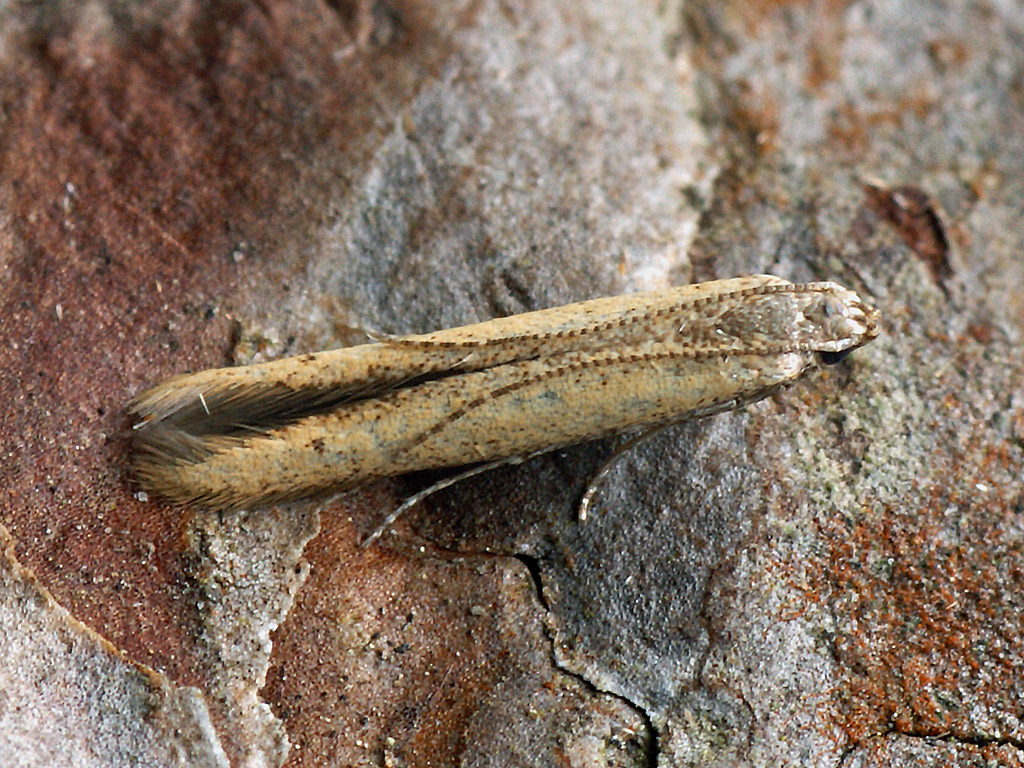

Scientific classification
- Kingdom: Animalia
- Phylum: Arthropoda
- Clade: Pancrustacea
- Class: Insecta
- Order: Lepidoptera
- Family: Batrachedridae
- Genus: Batrachedra
- Species: B. pinicolella

Binomial name
- Batrachedra pinicolella (Zeller, 1839)

Synonyms
- Cosmopteryx pinicolella Zeller, 1839

= Batrachedra pinicolella =

Species of moth

Batrachedra parvulipunctella is a species of moth of the family Batrachedridae. It is found from most of Europe (except most of the Balkan Peninsula) east through the Caucasus and southern Siberia to the Russian Far East.

The wingspan is 9–13 mm. Adults are on wing from mid June to August or September in one generation per year.

The larvae feed on Abies, Picea and Pinus species. Young larvae mine the needles of their host plant. Larvae can be found from September to May.
