= Batrachedra acrodeta =

Scientific classification
- Kingdom: Animalia
- Phylum: Arthropoda
- Class: Insecta
- Order: Lepidoptera
- Family: Batrachedridae
- Genus: Batrachedra
- Species: B. acrodeta

Binomial name
- Batrachedra acrodeta Meyrick, 1927

Moth species in family Batrachedridae

Batrachedra acrodeta is a moth in the family Batrachedridae. It is found on Samoa.
