= Batrachedra salicipomenella =

Scientific classification
- Kingdom: Animalia
- Phylum: Arthropoda
- Class: Insecta
- Order: Lepidoptera
- Family: Batrachedridae
- Genus: Batrachedra
- Species: B. salicipomenella

Binomial name
- Batrachedra salicipomenella Clemens, 1865

Moth species in family Batrachedridae

Batrachedra salicipomenella is a moth in the family Batrachedridae. It is found in North America, where it has been recorded from Illinois, Maine and New Hampshire. The larvae have been recorded feeding on Salix.
