= Batrachedra busiris =

Scientific classification
- Kingdom: Animalia
- Phylum: Arthropoda
- Clade: Pancrustacea
- Class: Insecta
- Order: Lepidoptera
- Family: Batrachedridae
- Genus: Batrachedra
- Species: B. busiris

Binomial name
- Batrachedra busiris Hodges, 1966

Moth species in family Batrachedridae

Batrachedra busiris is a moth in the family Batrachedridae. It is found in Florida, United States.
