= Batrachedra illusor =

Scientific classification
- Kingdom: Animalia
- Phylum: Arthropoda
- Clade: Pancrustacea
- Class: Insecta
- Order: Lepidoptera
- Family: Batrachedridae
- Genus: Batrachedra
- Species: B. illusor

Binomial name
- Batrachedra illusor Hodges, 1966

Moth species in family Batrachedridae

Batrachedra illusor is a moth in the family Batrachedridae. It is found in North America, where it has been recorded from California, Illinois, Indiana and Ohio.

The wingspan is about 8 mm. Adults have been recorded on wing in March and from May to July.
