= Batrachedra conspersa =

Scientific classification
- Kingdom: Animalia
- Phylum: Arthropoda
- Class: Insecta
- Order: Lepidoptera
- Family: Batrachedridae
- Genus: Batrachedra
- Species: B. conspersa

Binomial name
- Batrachedra conspersa Meyrick, 1916

Moth species in family Batrachedridae

Batrachedra conspersa is a moth in the family Batrachedridae. It is found in Ecuador.
