= Batrachedra dolichoscia =

Scientific classification
- Kingdom: Animalia
- Phylum: Arthropoda
- Class: Insecta
- Order: Lepidoptera
- Family: Batrachedridae
- Genus: Batrachedra
- Species: B. dolichoscia

Binomial name
- Batrachedra dolichoscia Meyrick, 1928

Moth species in family Batrachedridae

Batrachedra dolichoscia is a moth in the family Batrachedridae. It is found in Colombia. It is part of the genus Batrachedra.
