= Batrachedra chasanella =

Scientific classification
- Kingdom: Animalia
- Phylum: Arthropoda
- Clade: Pancrustacea
- Class: Insecta
- Order: Lepidoptera
- Family: Batrachedridae
- Genus: Batrachedra
- Species: B. chasanella

Binomial name
- Batrachedra chasanella Sinev, 1993

Moth species in family Batrachedridae

Batrachedra chasanella is a species of moth of the family Batrachedridae. It is found in Russia.
