= Batrachedra stenosema =

Scientific classification
- Kingdom: Animalia
- Phylum: Arthropoda
- Class: Insecta
- Order: Lepidoptera
- Family: Batrachedridae
- Genus: Batrachedra
- Species: B. stenosema

Binomial name
- Batrachedra stenosema Lower, 1904

Moth species in family Batrachedridae

Batrachedra stenosema is a moth in the family Batrachedridae. It is found in Australia (including New South Wales).
