= Batrachedra macroloncha =

Scientific classification
- Kingdom: Animalia
- Phylum: Arthropoda
- Class: Insecta
- Order: Lepidoptera
- Family: Batrachedridae
- Genus: Batrachedra
- Species: B. macroloncha

Binomial name
- Batrachedra macroloncha Meyrick, 1916

Species of moth

Batrachedra macroloncha is a moth in the family Batrachedridae. It was described in 1916 by Edward Meyrick and is found in Sri Lanka.
