= Batrachedra albicapitella =

Scientific classification
- Kingdom: Animalia
- Phylum: Arthropoda
- Class: Insecta
- Order: Lepidoptera
- Family: Batrachedridae
- Genus: Batrachedra
- Species: B. albicapitella

Binomial name
- Batrachedra albicapitella Sinev, 1986

Moth species in family Batrachedridae

Batrachedra albicapitella is a moth in the family Batrachedridae. It is found in Russia, Korea and Japan.

This moth was first described in 1986 by Sergej Yurjevitsch Sinev.
