= Batrachedra saurota =

Scientific classification
- Kingdom: Animalia
- Phylum: Arthropoda
- Class: Insecta
- Order: Lepidoptera
- Family: Batrachedridae
- Genus: Batrachedra
- Species: B. saurota

Binomial name
- Batrachedra saurota Meyrick, 1911

Moth species in family Batrachedridae

Batrachedra saurota is a species of moth of the family Batrachedridae. It is known from South Africa.
