= Batrachedra testor =

Scientific classification
- Kingdom: Animalia
- Phylum: Arthropoda
- Clade: Pancrustacea
- Class: Insecta
- Order: Lepidoptera
- Family: Batrachedridae
- Genus: Batrachedra
- Species: B. testor

Binomial name
- Batrachedra testor Hodges, 1966

Moth species in family Batrachedridae

Batrachedra testor is a moth in the family Batrachedridae. It is found in North America, where it has been recorded from Florida.

The wingspan is about 9 mm. Adults have been recorded on wing from January to May.
