= Batrachedra decoctor =

Scientific classification
- Kingdom: Animalia
- Phylum: Arthropoda
- Class: Insecta
- Order: Lepidoptera
- Family: Batrachedridae
- Genus: Batrachedra
- Species: B. decoctor

Binomial name
- Batrachedra decoctor Hodges, (1966)

Moth species in family Batrachedridae

Batrachedra decoctor is a species of moth of the family Batrachedridae. It is native to the southeastern United States, especially northern Florida.

== Ecology ==
In its larval state it feeds exclusively on saw palmetto (Serenoa repens).

== Subspecies ==
- Batrachedra decoctor decoctor
- Batrachedra decoctor bermudensis Hodges, 1966 (Bermuda)
