= Batrachedra concitata =

Scientific classification
- Kingdom: Animalia
- Phylum: Arthropoda
- Class: Insecta
- Order: Lepidoptera
- Family: Batrachedridae
- Genus: Batrachedra
- Species: B. concitata

Binomial name
- Batrachedra concitata Meyrick, 1928

Moth species in family Batrachedridae

Batrachedra concitata is a moth in the family Batrachedridae. It is found in North America, where it has been recorded from Arizona, New Mexico and Texas.

The wingspan is about 16 mm. Adults have been recorded on wing from September to November.
