= Batrachedra psithyra =

Scientific classification
- Kingdom: Animalia
- Phylum: Arthropoda
- Clade: Pancrustacea
- Class: Insecta
- Order: Lepidoptera
- Family: Batrachedridae
- Genus: Batrachedra
- Species: B. psithyra

Binomial name
- Batrachedra psithyra Meyrick, 1889

Synonyms
- Batrachedra psathyra (Meyrick, 1889)

Moth species in family Batrachedridae

Batrachedra psithyra, the spleenwort spore-eater, is a species of moth of the family Batrachedridae. It is endemic to New Zealand. This species has been observed in the North, South and Matiu / Somes Islands. This species inhabits overgrown grasslands or fern glades and have also been observed in gumland heath. The larvae of this species feed on fern sori including those on Histiopteris incisa. Adults are on the wing from November to January and tends to fly at sunset. At rest this species raises the front part of its body and when moving waves alternate antennae.

== Taxonomy ==
Batrachedra psithyra was described in 1889 by Edward Meyrick using material he collected in Hamilton. George Hudson discussed and illustrated this species in his 1928 publication The Butterflies and Moths of New Zealand under the name Batrachedra psathyra. The lectotype specimen is held by the Natural History Museum, London.

== Description ==
The larva of this species is small and pale. When mature it is between 5 and 6 mm long with a head that is light brown.

B. psithyra.

Meyrick described the species as follows:

♂︎. 7-10mm. Head, thorax, and abdomen pearly white. Palpi white, second joint with a blackish sub-apical ring, scales slightly projecting, terminal joint with a blackish basal ring. Antennae white, indistinctly ringed with pale fuscous. Legs white, indistinctly banded with fuscous. Forewings elongate, very narrow, long-pointed; veins 6 and 7 stalked; white, more or less sprinkled with fuscous; a dark fuscous elongate dot in disc before middle, a second very obliquely before it on fold, and a third in disc beyond 2/3; a sharply-marked black apical dot : cilia whitish, with a black line opposite apex only. Hindwings with veins 2, 3, and 5 absent; whitish; cilia whitish.

The small dark dot and line of scales right at the end tip of the wing is characteristic of this species.

== Distribution ==
This species is endemic to New Zealand. Specimens have been collected in Kaeo, Auckland, Hamilton, Wellington, Nelson, Christchurch, Queenstown and Invercargill. It has also been found in Fiordland, and on Somes Island.

== Biology and behaviour ==
The larvae of this species lives under its host fern fronds feeding on spores. It creates an H-shaped silken cocoon and pupates within the cross bar that cocoon. The adult moths of this species is on the wing from November to January. It flies freely at sunset. Hudson stated it was common in the upper parts of the Wellington Reservoir Reserve, an area now known as Zealandia. At rest, this species raises the forepart of its body and when about to move has a habit of waving alternate antennae.

== Habitat and host species ==
The species prefers rough overgrown habitat of grasslands or fern glades near forest. This species has also been found in gumland heath habitat. The larvae of this species feed on fern sori and hosts include species in the genus Asplenium as well as the species Histiopteris incisa.
