= Batrachedra meator =

Scientific classification
- Kingdom: Animalia
- Phylum: Arthropoda
- Clade: Pancrustacea
- Class: Insecta
- Order: Lepidoptera
- Family: Batrachedridae
- Genus: Batrachedra
- Species: B. meator

Binomial name
- Batrachedra meator Hodges, 1966

Moth species in family Batrachedridae

Batrachedra meator is a moth in the family Batrachedridae. It is found on St. Lucia.

This species was described by Ronald W. Hodges in 1966.
