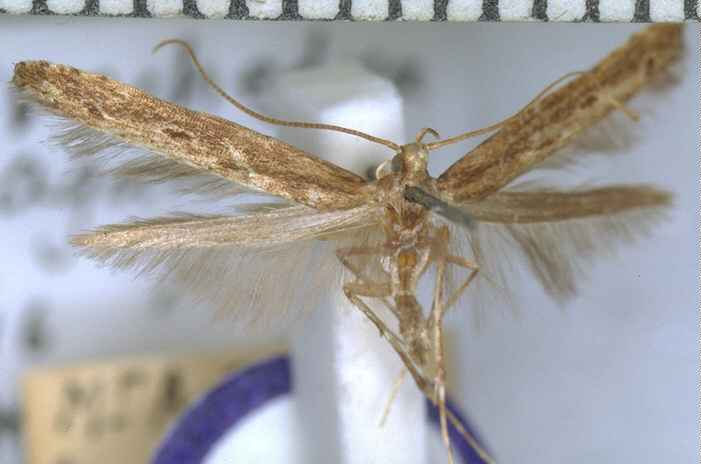
- Lectotype

Scientific classification
- Kingdom: Animalia
- Phylum: Arthropoda
- Clade: Pancrustacea
- Class: Insecta
- Order: Lepidoptera
- Family: Batrachedridae
- Genus: Batrachedra
- Species: B. agaura

Binomial name
- Batrachedra agaura Meyrick, 1901

= Batrachedra agaura =

Moth species in family Batrachedridae

Batrachedra agaura is a species of moth in the family Batrachedridae. It is endemic to New Zealand. This species is distributed throughout the country. The species inhabits native forests, especially beech and kanuka forests or manuka scrubland. The larvae of this species are associated with sooty mold and sooty beech scale. It has been hypothesized that the larvae feed on sooty beech scale. However, they may also feed on the sooty mold itself. The adult female is lighter in appearance than the male, and the species shows considerable variation in patterns on the forewing. Adults are on the wing from October to February. They are nocturnal and occasionally attracted to light.

== Taxonomy ==
This species was described in 1901 by Edward Meyrick. George Hudson discussed and illustrated this species both in his 1928 publication The Butterflies and Moths of New Zealand, and in his 1950 book Fragments of New Zealand Entomology. John S. Dugdale criticised the quality of Hudson's illustrations, arguing that the images were not as brown as specimens of the moth. The lectotype was collected by Meyrick at Mount Arthur below Flora Saddle in the Nelson district. This specimen is held at the Natural History Museum, London.

== Description ==
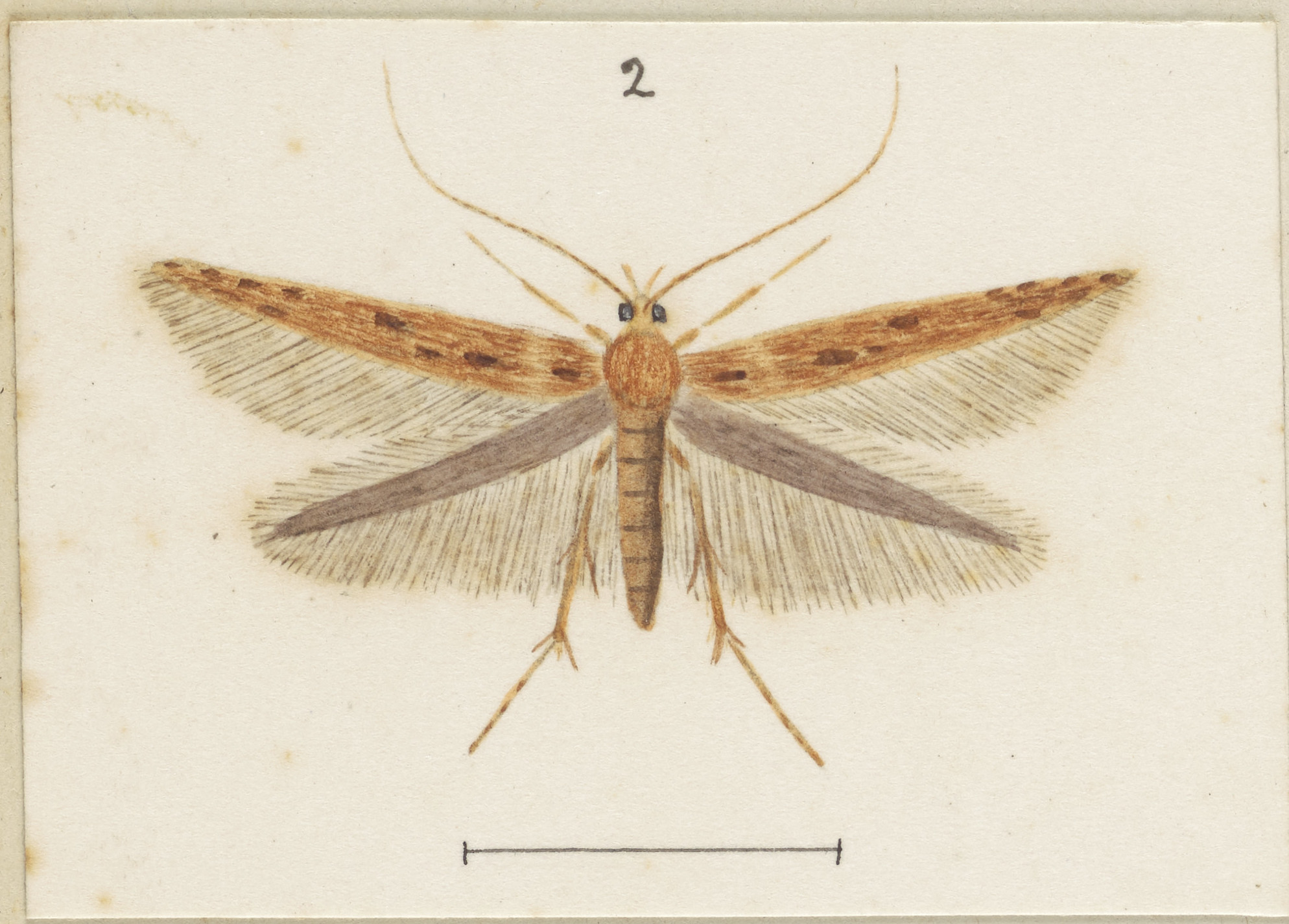
Female B. agaura by Hudson.

Meyrick described the species as follows:

♂♀. 13-17 m.m. Head pale whitish-ochreous. Palpi whitish, second joint dark fuscous towards apex, scale-projection slight, terminal joint more or less suffused with dark fuscous except base and apex. Antennae and thorax whitish-ochreous, reddish-tinged. Abdomen ochreous-whitish. Legs dark fuscous, suffusedly ringed with ochreous-whitish. Forewings whitish-ochreous or pale reddish-ochreous, more or less suffused with dark fuscous or dark reddish-fuscous irroration; plical and first and second discal stigmata large, dark fuscous, plical at 2/5, first discal slightly beyond middle : cilia pale fuscous, on costa ochreous-whitish dotted with dark fuscous, round apex with a black basal line. Hindwings rather dark fuscous; cilia light fuscous or pale ochreous.

Alfred Philpott described the proboscis of the adult of this species as being long and well-developed. The female of the species is lighter in appearance than the male. The color and markings of this species show considerable variation.

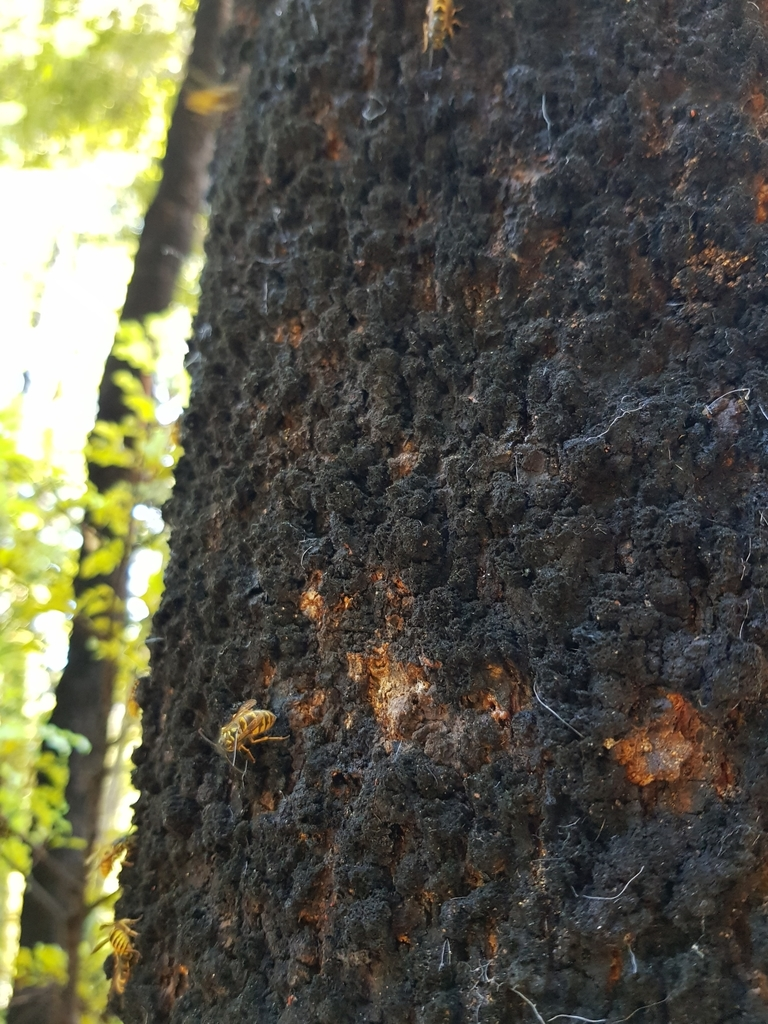
Sooty beech scale

== Distribution ==
This species is endemic to New Zealand. Specimens have been collected from Kaeo in the North Island to Invercargill in the South Island and it is regarded as being generally distributed throughout the country. This species has also been recorded at Pitt Island in the Chatham Islands.

== Biology and behaviour ==
Adults are on the wing from October to February. They are nocturnal and are occasionally attracted to light. The larvae form a cocoon in their feeding place and pupate there.

== Habitat and host species ==
This moth prefers native forest habitats, especially beech forest and manuka scrubland. It is also known to inhabit kanuka forest. The larvae of this species are associated with sooty mold and sooty beech scale. It has been hypothesised that B. agaura larvae feed on sooty beech scale. However, they may also feed on the sooty mold itself. If B. agaura are found to consume scale insects this species will be one of the few that have larvae that are predatory.

== Gallery showing colour variation ==
Male

Darker form
