= Batrachedra ochricomella =

Scientific classification
- Kingdom: Animalia
- Phylum: Arthropoda
- Clade: Pancrustacea
- Class: Insecta
- Order: Lepidoptera
- Family: Batrachedridae
- Genus: Batrachedra
- Species: B. ochricomella

Binomial name
- Batrachedra ochricomella Sinev, 1993

Moth species in family Batrachedridae

Batrachedra ochricomella is a moth in the family Batrachedridae. It is found in Russia.
