= Batrachedra microbias =

Scientific classification
- Kingdom: Animalia
- Phylum: Arthropoda
- Class: Insecta
- Order: Lepidoptera
- Family: Batrachedridae
- Genus: Batrachedra
- Species: B. microbias

Binomial name
- Batrachedra microbias Meyrick, 1914

Moth species in family Batrachedridae

Batrachedra microbias is a species of moth of the family Batrachedridae. It is known from South Africa.
