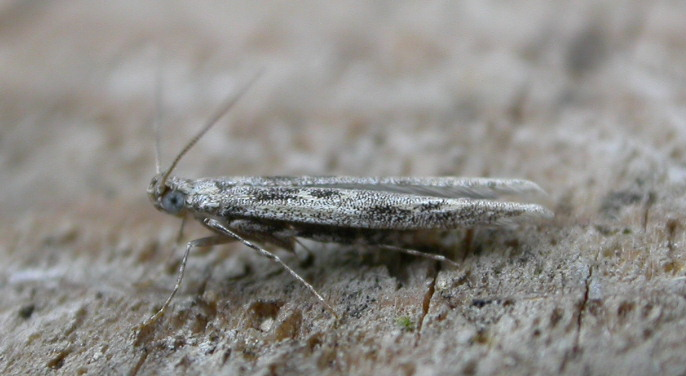

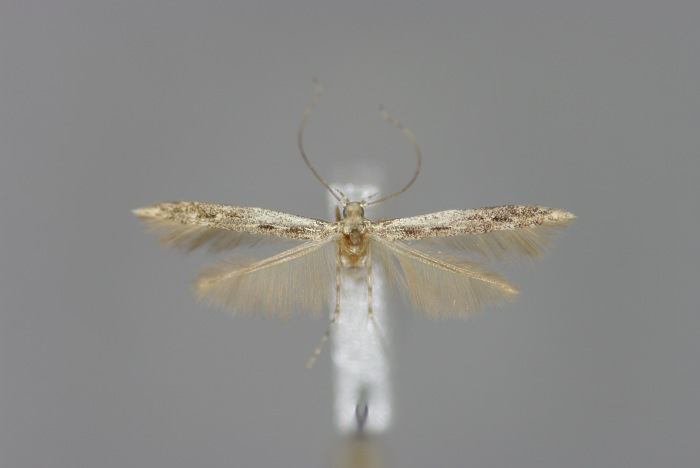

Scientific classification
- Kingdom: Animalia
- Phylum: Arthropoda
- Clade: Pancrustacea
- Class: Insecta
- Order: Lepidoptera
- Family: Batrachedridae
- Genus: Batrachedra
- Species: B. praeangusta

Binomial name
- Batrachedra praeangusta (Haworth, 1828)

Synonyms
- Gracillaria praeangusta Haworth, 1828; Cosmopteryx praeangustella Doubleday, 1859; Ornix turdipennella Kollar, 1832

= Batrachedra praeangusta =

Species of moth

Batrachedra praeangusta is a moth of the family Batrachedridae which is native to Europe. It is also found in North America. It was first described by Adrian Haworth in 1828 from the type specimen found in England. The foodplants of the larvae are poplars (Populus species) and willows (Salix species).

== Life cycle ==
The moths have elongated narrow forewings with a wingspan of 14–15 mm. The forewings have a white background, with a mix of sooty black and paler colour and the hindwings are shining grey, becoming lighter towards the end.

The moth is univoltine (i.e. one generation a year) flying from mid-June to early-September, and can be found on tree trunks and comes to light.

=== Ovum ===
Eggs are laid on various species of poplar including aspen (Populus tremula), white poplar (Populus alba) and willows, such as goat willow (Salix caprea) and white willow (Salix alba). Probably on a twig.

=== Larva ===
The head of the larva is brown, lighter in front, while the colour of the body is from yellow-brown to darker brown with pale yellow spots and a broad white line. The prothoracic plate is dark brown and the anal plate is bright yellow. The larva take twenty days to develop and can be found from April to June. The larvae live in female catkins, at first in a mine in the flowers and seeds. Later it feeds from a tough web, retreating when disturbed. The catkins are partly or completely destroyed by the larva. If it runs out of catkins the larva bore into the base of a bud, hollowing it out and ejecting the frass which can be seen in a small pile on the bud.

=== Pupa ===
The larva leaves it web and forms a bright-brown slender pupa, in a narrow felt-like cocoon covered in lichen. Often in a crack in the bark of the foodplant. Pupa development takes 10–14 days in June and July.

== Distribution ==
This moth is found in Europe and North America.
