= Batrachedra scitator =

Scientific classification
- Kingdom: Animalia
- Phylum: Arthropoda
- Clade: Pancrustacea
- Class: Insecta
- Order: Lepidoptera
- Family: Batrachedridae
- Genus: Batrachedra
- Species: B. scitator

Binomial name
- Batrachedra scitator Hodges, 1966

Moth species in family Batrachedridae

Batrachedra scitator is a moth in the family Batrachedridae. It is found in North America, where it has been recorded from Arizona.
