= Batrachedra verax =

Scientific classification
- Kingdom: Animalia
- Phylum: Arthropoda
- Class: Insecta
- Order: Lepidoptera
- Family: Batrachedridae
- Genus: Batrachedra
- Species: B. verax

Binomial name
- Batrachedra verax Meyrick, 1917

Moth species in family Batrachedridae

Batrachedra verax is a species of moth in the family Batrachedridae. It was first described by Edward Meyrick in 1917 and is found in Sri Lanka.
