= Batrachedra angusta =

Scientific classification
- Kingdom: Animalia
- Phylum: Arthropoda
- Class: Insecta
- Order: Lepidoptera
- Family: Batrachedridae
- Genus: Batrachedra
- Species: B. angusta

Binomial name
- Batrachedra angusta Turati, 1930

Moth species in family Batrachedridae

Batrachedra angusta is a moth in the family Batrachedridae. It is found in Libya.
