= Batrachedra epimyxa =

Scientific classification
- Kingdom: Animalia
- Phylum: Arthropoda
- Class: Insecta
- Order: Lepidoptera
- Family: Batrachedridae
- Genus: Batrachedra
- Species: B. epimyxa

Binomial name
- Batrachedra epimyxa Meyrick, 1916

Moth species in family Batrachedridae

Batrachedra epimyxa is a moth in the family Batrachedridae. It is found in India.
