= Batrachedra amydraula =

Scientific classification
- Kingdom: Animalia
- Phylum: Arthropoda
- Class: Insecta
- Order: Lepidoptera
- Family: Batrachedridae
- Genus: Batrachedra
- Species: B. amydraula

Binomial name
- Batrachedra amydraula Meyrick, 1916

Moth species in family Batrachedridae

Batrachedra amydraula, the lesser date moth, is a species of moth of the family Batrachedridae found from Bangladesh to western Saudi Arabia, Yemen, Israel, Iraq, and Iran, as well as most of North Africa.

The wingspan is 10–14 mm.

The larvae feed on Derris trifoliata and Phoenix dactylifera.
