= Batrachedra isochtha =

Scientific classification
- Kingdom: Animalia
- Phylum: Arthropoda
- Clade: Pancrustacea
- Class: Insecta
- Order: Lepidoptera
- Family: Batrachedridae
- Genus: Batrachedra
- Species: B. isochtha

Binomial name
- Batrachedra isochtha Meyrick, 1914

Moth species in family Batrachedridae

Batrachedra isochtha is a species of moth of the family Batrachedridae. It was described by Edward Meyrick and is known from South Africa.

The larvae feed on Phoenix species.
