= Batrachedra subglauca =

Scientific classification
- Kingdom: Animalia
- Phylum: Arthropoda
- Clade: Pancrustacea
- Class: Insecta
- Order: Lepidoptera
- Family: Batrachedridae
- Genus: Batrachedra
- Species: B. subglauca

Binomial name
- Batrachedra subglauca Sinev, 1979

Moth species in family Batrachedridae

Batrachedra subglauca is a moth in the family Batrachedridae. It is found in Mongolia.
