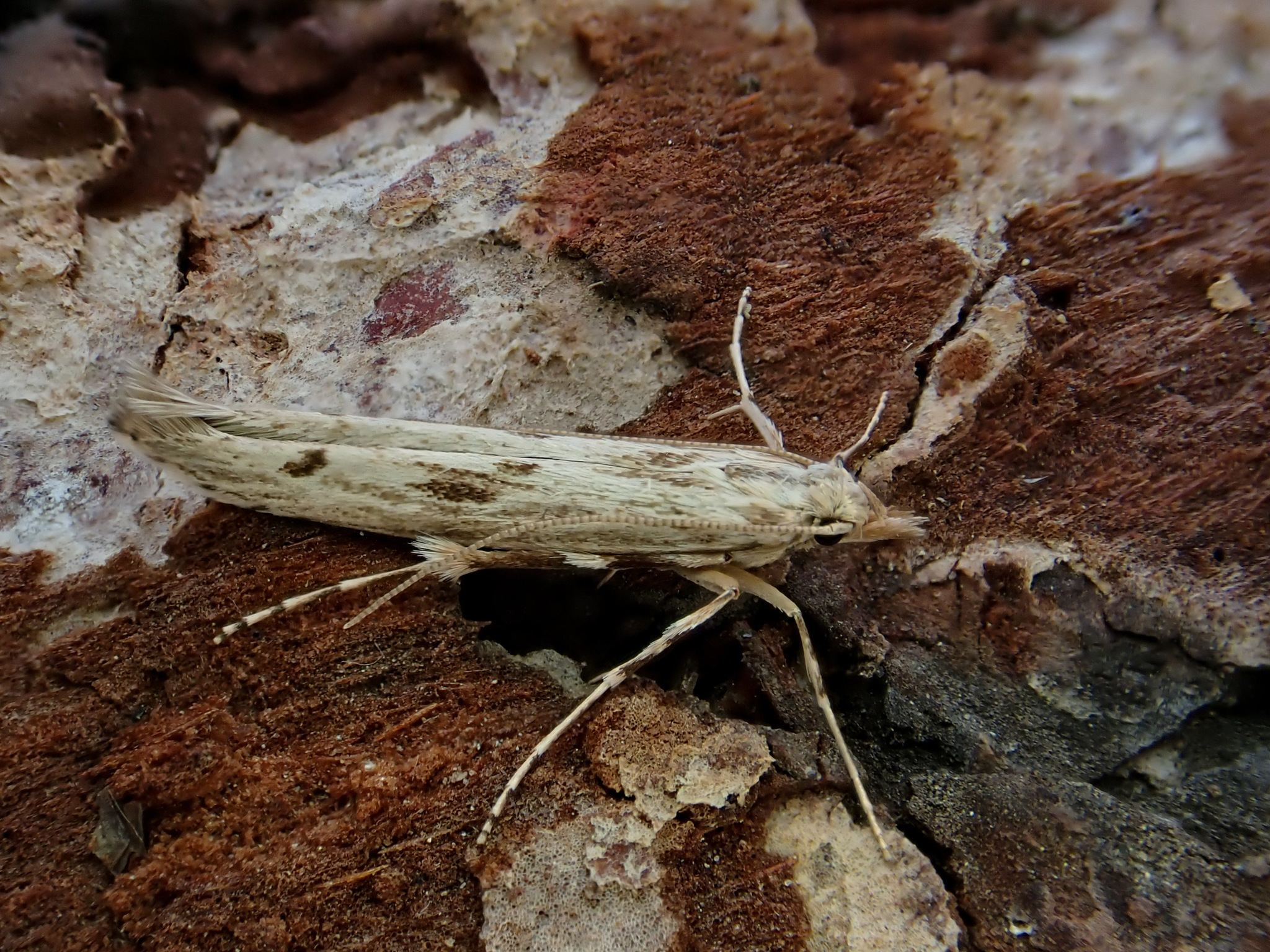

Scientific classification
- Kingdom: Animalia
- Phylum: Arthropoda
- Clade: Pancrustacea
- Class: Insecta
- Order: Lepidoptera
- Family: Batrachedridae
- Genus: Batrachedra
- Species: B. eucola

Binomial name
- Batrachedra eucola Meyrick, 1889

= Batrachedra eucola =

Moth species in family Batrachedridae

Batrachedra eucola is a species of moth in the family Batrachedridae. It is endemic to New Zealand and found both the North and South Islands. This species frequents scrubland habitat and is on the wing in January and February. B. eucola can be easily distinguished from its close relatives as it larger in size, has a pronounced palpi tuft and has full neuration of its hindwings.

== Taxonomy ==
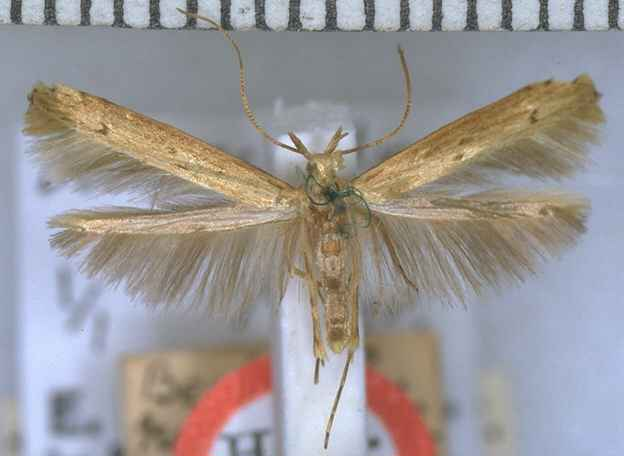
Batrachedra eucola holotype

This species was first described by Edward Meyrick in 1889. George Hudson discussed and illustrated this species in his 1928 publication The Butterflies and Moths of New Zealand. The holotype specimen of this species was collected near the Bealey River in North Canterbury. This specimen is held at the Natural History Museum, London.

== Description ==
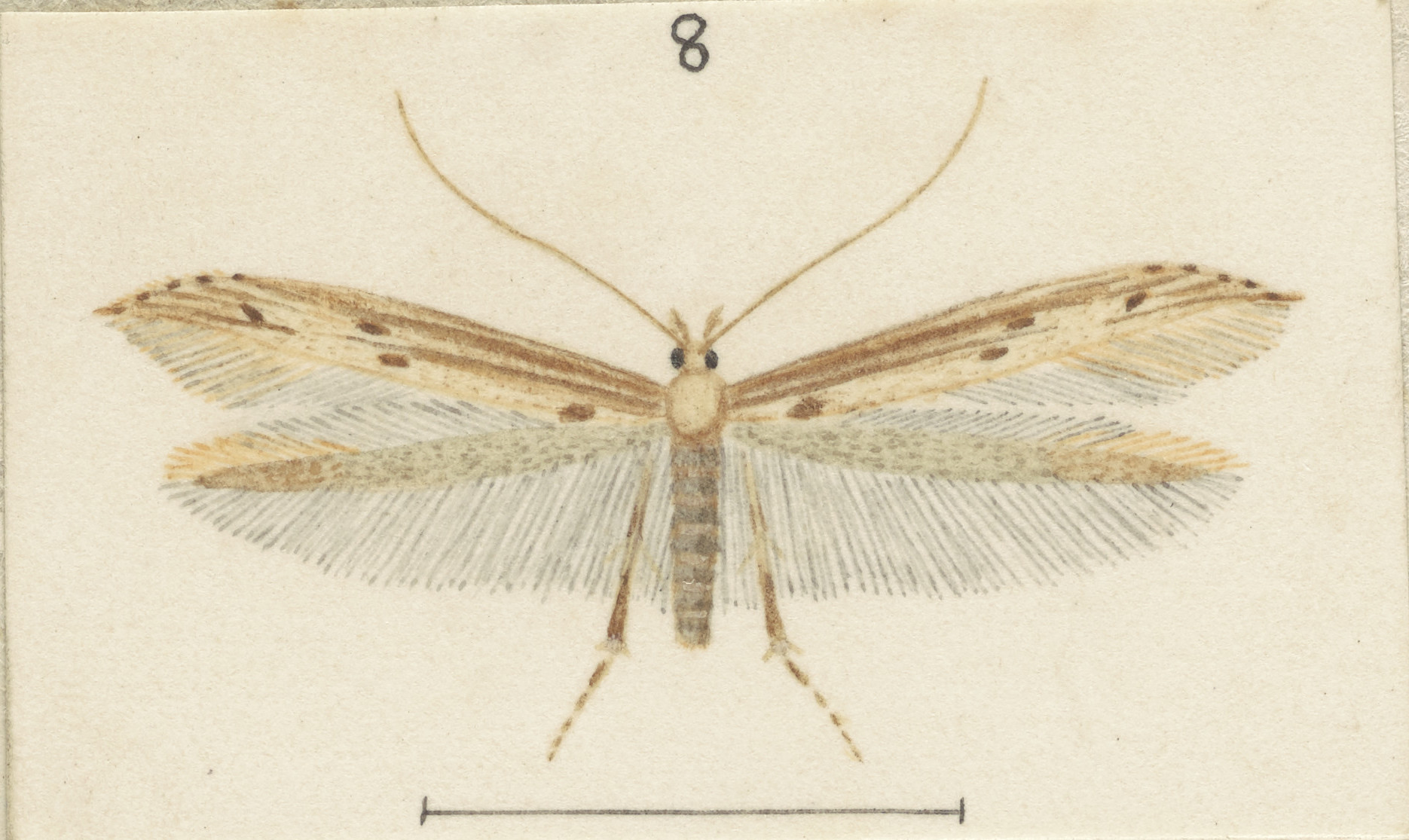
Batrachedra eucola illustrated by George Hudson

Meyrick described the species as follows:

♂︎. 19mm. Head and antennae whitish-ochreous. Palpi whitish-ochreous, terminal joint and apex of second more brownish, second joint with scales projecting in front into an angular tuft. Thorax pale brownish-ochreous. Abdomen whitish-ochreous. Legs dark fuscous, apex of joints whitish-ochreous. Forewings elongate, very narrow, parallel-sided, long-pointed; veins 6 and 7 stalked; whitish-ochreous, somewhat sprinkled with brownish-ochreous, towards costa broadly suffused with brownish-ochreous, costal edge fuscous towards base; a dark fuscous dot in disc before middle, a second on fold obliquely before first, and a third, larger and somewhat transverse, in disc before 3/4 : cilia whitish-ochreous, beneath anal angle greyish-tinged, on costa marked with three dark fuscous dots, with indications of two dark fuscous lines at apex only. Hindwings with all veins present; grey, slightly ochreous-tinged; cilia light grey, slightly ochreous-tinged, on costa whitish-ochreous.

B. eucola can be easily distinguished from its close relatives as it is larger in size, has a pronounced palpi tuft and has full neuration of its hindwings.

== Distribution ==
This species is endemic to New Zealand. Along with northern Canterbury, this species has also been collected at Whangārei, National Park, Wellington, Aorere River near Nelson, and Hope Arm, in Fiordland.

== Biology and behaviour ==
This species is on the wing in January and February. This species frequents scrubland habitat.
