= Batrachedra epombra =

Scientific classification
- Kingdom: Animalia
- Phylum: Arthropoda
- Class: Insecta
- Order: Lepidoptera
- Family: Batrachedridae
- Genus: Batrachedra
- Species: B. epombra

Binomial name
- Batrachedra epombra Meyrick, 1914

Moth species in family Batrachedridae

Batrachedra epombra is a species of moth of the family Batrachedridae. It is known to reside in South Africa.
