= Batrachedra substrata =

Scientific classification
- Kingdom: Animalia
- Phylum: Arthropoda
- Class: Insecta
- Order: Lepidoptera
- Family: Batrachedridae
- Genus: Batrachedra
- Species: B. substrata

Binomial name
- Batrachedra substrata Meyrick, 1916

Moth species in family Batrachedridae

Batrachedra substrata is a species of moth in the family Batrachedridae. It was described by Edward Meyrick in 1916 and is found in Sri Lanka.
