= Batrachedra scapulata =

Scientific classification
- Kingdom: Animalia
- Phylum: Arthropoda
- Class: Insecta
- Order: Lepidoptera
- Family: Batrachedridae
- Genus: Batrachedra
- Species: B. scapulata

Binomial name
- Batrachedra scapulata Meyrick, 1917

Moth species in family Batrachedridae

Batrachedra scapulata is a species of moth in the family Batrachedridae. It was described by Edward Meyrick in 1917 and is found in Sri Lanka.
