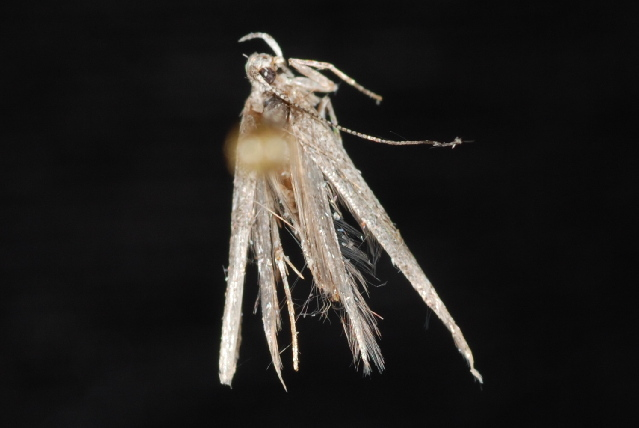

Scientific classification
- Kingdom: Animalia
- Phylum: Arthropoda
- Class: Insecta
- Order: Lepidoptera
- Family: Batrachedridae
- Genus: Batrachedra
- Species: B. striolata

Binomial name
- Batrachedra striolata Zeller, 1875

Synonyms
- Batrachedra clemensella Chambers, 1877; Batrachedra pulvella Chambers, 1876

= Batrachedra striolata =

Moth species in family Batrachedridae

Batrachedra striolata is a moth in the family Batrachedridae. It is found in North America, where it has been recorded from British Columbia to California. The larvae have been recorded feeding on Agave shawii, and Salix lasiolepis.
