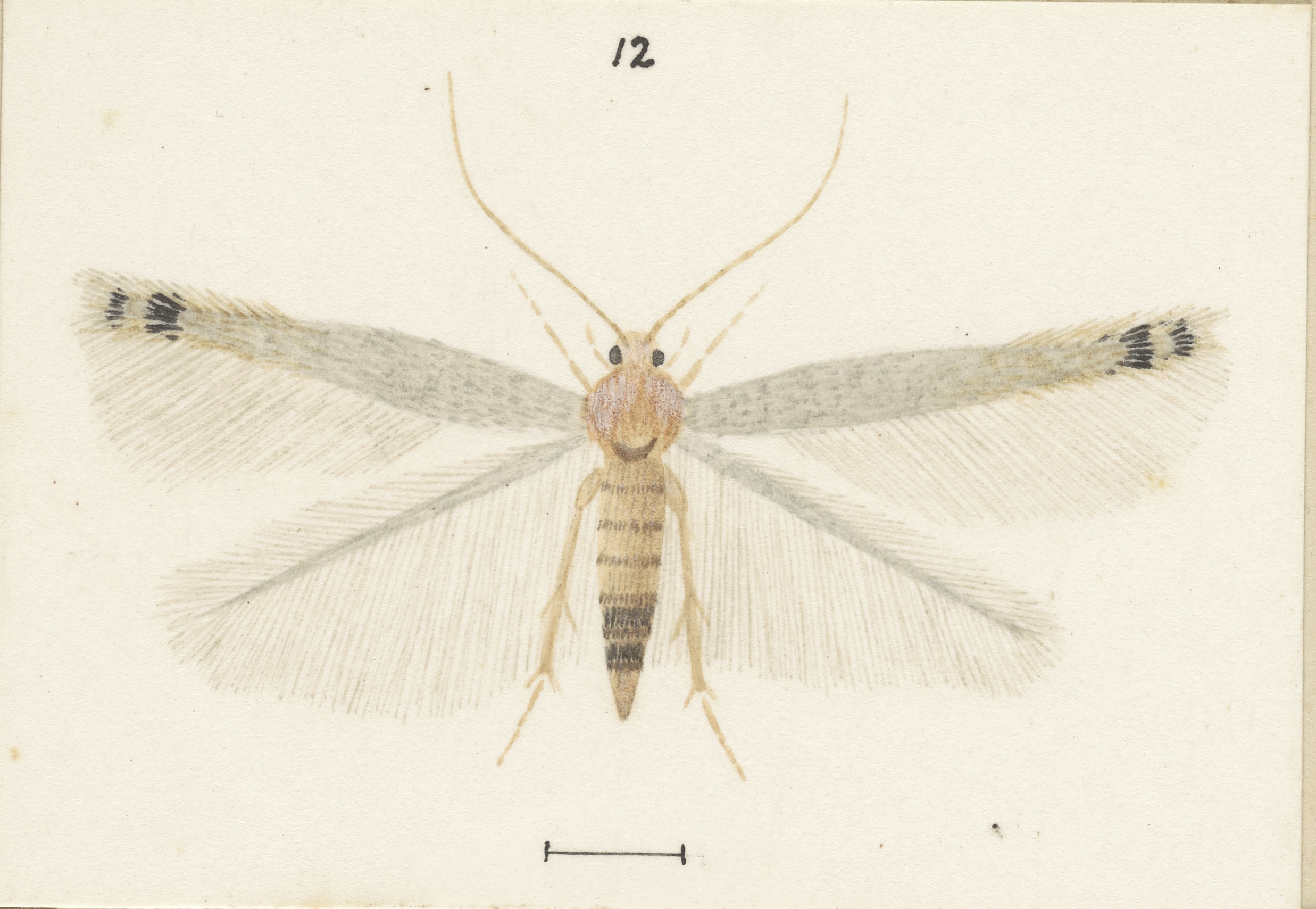
- Female
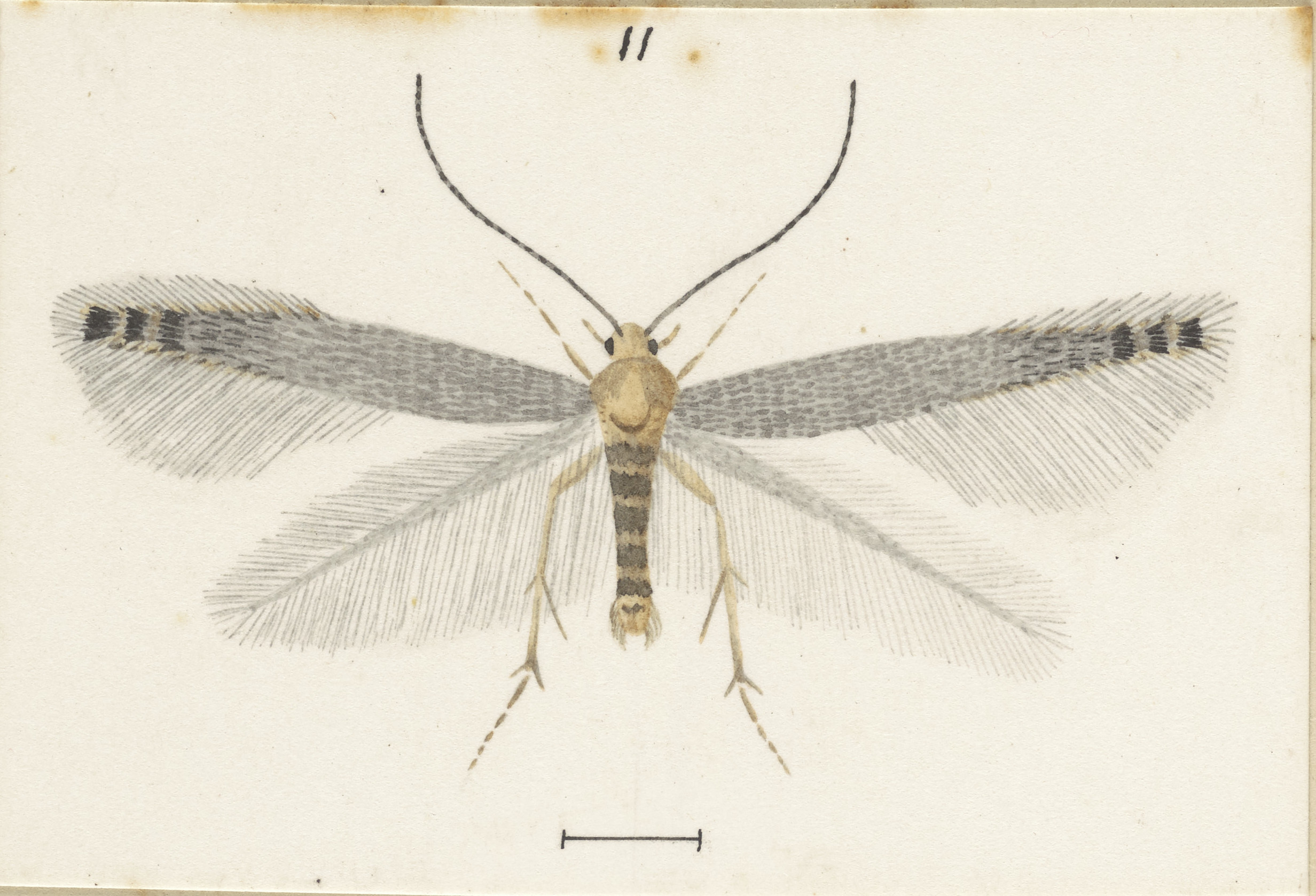
- Male

Scientific classification
- Kingdom: Animalia
- Phylum: Arthropoda
- Clade: Pancrustacea
- Class: Insecta
- Order: Lepidoptera
- Family: Batrachedridae
- Genus: Batrachedra
- Species: B. filicicola

Binomial name
- Batrachedra filicicola Meyrick, 1917

= Batrachedra filicicola =

Moth species in family Batrachedridae

Batrachedra filicicola, also known as the ring fern spore-eater, is a species of moth of the family Batrachedridae. It is endemic to New Zealand and has been collected in the North Island. The larvae of this species feed on the spores of the silver fern. Adults are on the wing in November and December. This species is attracted to light and has also been collected in the day by sweeping silver fern fonds.

== Taxonomy ==
This species was first described by Edward Meyrick in 1917 using material collected by George Hudson at Karori on tree-ferns in November. George Hudson discussed and illustrated this species in his 1928 book The Butterflies and Moths of New Zealand. The lectotype specimen is held at the Natural History Museum, London.

== Description ==
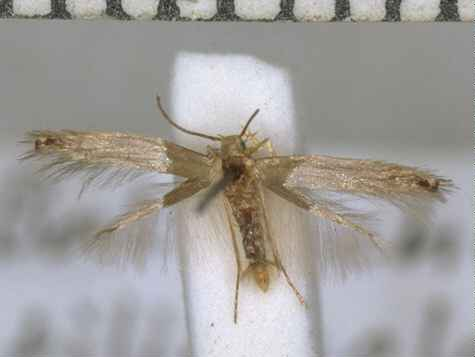
Lectotype specimen

The mature larva of this species is small and white coloured and grows up to 5 mm long.

Meyrick described the male adult of this species as follows:

♂︎. 8 mm. Head and thorax bronzy-whitish. Palpi with appressed scales, whitish, with faint greyish marks at apex of second joint, and base and apex of terminal joint. Abdomen grey. Forewings narrow-lanceolate, apex narrowly produced; violet-grey, becoming darker posteriorly, produced apex blackish : cilia grey, base round apical third of wing paler and sprinkled with blackish, sometimes forming indistinct dots, at apex with a short black subbasal bar. Hindwings violet-grey; cilia grey.

== Distribution ==
B. filicicola is endemic to New Zealand. It has been collected in Wellington and in the Hawkes Bay.

== Biology and behaviour ==
This species is on the wing in November and December. This species is attracted to light. Adults have been collected in sunshine by sweeping the fonds of its larval hosts. It is a fast runner and makes short, rapid flights.

== Host species ==
The larva of this moth feed on the spores of Cyathea dealbata and has been said to feed on Paesia scaberula. This latter species being a larval host is likely to be mistaken.
