= Batrachedra smilacis =

Scientific classification
- Kingdom: Animalia
- Phylum: Arthropoda
- Class: Insecta
- Order: Lepidoptera
- Family: Batrachedridae
- Genus: Batrachedra
- Species: B. smilacis

Binomial name
- Batrachedra smilacis Sugisima, 2006

Moth species in family Batrachedridae

Batrachedra smilacis is a moth in the family Batrachedridae. It is found in China and Korea.

The length of the forewings is 4.4 mm for males and 4.7 mm for females.

The larvae bore the fruit of Smilax china.
