= Batrachedra copia =

Scientific classification
- Kingdom: Animalia
- Phylum: Arthropoda
- Class: Insecta
- Order: Lepidoptera
- Family: Batrachedridae
- Genus: Batrachedra
- Species: B. copia

Binomial name
- Batrachedra copia Clarke, 1957

Moth species in family Batrachedridae

Batrachedra copia is a moth in the family Batrachedridae. It is found in Mexico.
