= Batrachedra aphypnota =

Scientific classification
- Kingdom: Animalia
- Phylum: Arthropoda
- Class: Insecta
- Order: Lepidoptera
- Family: Batrachedridae
- Genus: Batrachedra
- Species: B. aphypnota

Binomial name
- Batrachedra aphypnota (Meyrick, 1917)

Synonyms
- Coleophora aphypnota Meyrick, 1917

Moth species in family Batrachedridae

Batrachedra aphypnota is a moth of the family Batrachedridae. It is found in Sri Lanka (western region, Puttalam).
