= Batrachedra tarsimaculata =

Scientific classification
- Kingdom: Animalia
- Phylum: Arthropoda
- Class: Insecta
- Order: Lepidoptera
- Family: Batrachedridae
- Genus: Batrachedra
- Species: B. tarsimaculata

Binomial name
- Batrachedra tarsimaculata Walsingham, 1897

Moth species in family Batrachedridae

Batrachedra tarsimaculata is a moth in the family Batrachedridae. It is found in the West Indies.
