= Batrachedra comosae =

Scientific classification
- Kingdom: Animalia
- Phylum: Arthropoda
- Clade: Pancrustacea
- Class: Insecta
- Order: Lepidoptera
- Family: Batrachedridae
- Genus: Batrachedra
- Species: B. comosae

Binomial name
- Batrachedra comosae Hodges, 1966

Moth species in family Batrachedridae

Batrachedra comosae is a moth in the family Batrachedridae. It is found on Puerto Rico. The larvae have been recorded feeding on Ananas comosus.
