= Batrachedra nuciferae =

Scientific classification
- Kingdom: Animalia
- Phylum: Arthropoda
- Clade: Pancrustacea
- Class: Insecta
- Order: Lepidoptera
- Family: Batrachedridae
- Genus: Batrachedra
- Species: B. nuciferae

Binomial name
- Batrachedra nuciferae Hodges, 1966

Moth species in family Batrachedridae

Batrachedra nuciferae is a moth in the family Batrachedridae. It is found in Brazil. The larvae have been recorded feeding on Attalea, Cocos nucifera, and Syagrus coronae.
