= Batrachedra atomosella =

Scientific classification
- Kingdom: Animalia
- Phylum: Arthropoda
- Class: Insecta
- Order: Lepidoptera
- Family: Batrachedridae
- Genus: Batrachedra
- Species: B. atomosella

Binomial name
- Batrachedra atomosella Walsingham, 1900

Moth species in family Batrachedridae

Batrachedra atomosella is a moth in the family Batrachedridae. It is found in Yemen.
