= Batrachedra knabi =

Scientific classification
- Kingdom: Animalia
- Phylum: Arthropoda
- Class: Insecta
- Order: Lepidoptera
- Family: Batrachedridae
- Genus: Batrachedra
- Species: B. knabi

Binomial name
- Batrachedra knabi (Walsingham, 1909)

Synonyms
- Homaledra knabi Walsingham, 1909

Moth species in family Batrachedridae

Batrachedra knabi is a moth in the family Batrachedridae. It is found in Mexico.
