= Batrachedra mictopsamma =

Scientific classification
- Kingdom: Animalia
- Phylum: Arthropoda
- Class: Insecta
- Order: Lepidoptera
- Family: Batrachedridae
- Genus: Batrachedra
- Species: B. mictopsamma

Binomial name
- Batrachedra mictopsamma Meyrick, 1932

Moth species in family Batrachedridae

Batrachedra mictopsamma is a moth in the family Batrachedridae. It is found in India.
