= Batrachedra libator =

Scientific classification
- Kingdom: Animalia
- Phylum: Arthropoda
- Clade: Pancrustacea
- Class: Insecta
- Order: Lepidoptera
- Family: Batrachedridae
- Genus: Batrachedra
- Species: B. libator

Binomial name
- Batrachedra libator Hodges, 1966

Moth species in family Batrachedridae

Batrachedra libator is a moth in the family Batrachedridae. It is found in Florida.
