= Batrachedra mathesoni =

Scientific classification
- Kingdom: Animalia
- Phylum: Arthropoda
- Class: Insecta
- Order: Lepidoptera
- Family: Batrachedridae
- Genus: Batrachedra
- Species: B. mathesoni

Binomial name
- Batrachedra mathesoni Busck, 1916

Moth species in family Batrachedridae

Batrachedra mathesoni is a moth in the family Batrachedridae. It is found in Florida. The larvae have been recorded feeding on Cocos nucifera.
