= Batrachedra myrmecophila =

Scientific classification
- Kingdom: Animalia
- Phylum: Arthropoda
- Class: Insecta
- Order: Lepidoptera
- Family: Batrachedridae
- Genus: Batrachedra
- Species: B. myrmecophila

Binomial name
- Batrachedra myrmecophila Snellen, 1908

Moth species in family Batrachedridae

Batrachedra myrmecophila is a moth in the family Batrachedridae. It is found on Java.
