= Batrachedra pastor =

Scientific classification
- Kingdom: Animalia
- Phylum: Arthropoda
- Class: Insecta
- Order: Lepidoptera
- Family: Batrachedridae
- Genus: Batrachedra
- Species: B. pastor

Binomial name
- Batrachedra pastor Meyrick, 1936

Moth species in family Batrachedridae

Batrachedra pastor is a moth in the family Batrachedridae. It is found in Taiwan.
