= Batrachedra pacabilis =

Scientific classification
- Kingdom: Animalia
- Phylum: Arthropoda
- Class: Insecta
- Order: Lepidoptera
- Family: Batrachedridae
- Genus: Batrachedra
- Species: B. pacabilis

Binomial name
- Batrachedra pacabilis Meyrick, 1922

Moth species in family Batrachedridae

Batrachedra pacabilis is a moth in the family Batrachedridae. It is found in Pakistan.
