= Batrachedra hypachroa =

Scientific classification
- Kingdom: Animalia
- Phylum: Arthropoda
- Class: Insecta
- Order: Lepidoptera
- Family: Batrachedridae
- Genus: Batrachedra
- Species: B. hypachroa

Binomial name
- Batrachedra hypachroa Meyrick, 1897

Moth species in family Batrachedridae

Batrachedra hypachroa is a species of moth of the family Batrachedridae. It is found in Australia.

== Original description ==
Male, Female 11-12 mm. Head whitish-ochreous. Palpi whitish, median and subapical rings of second joint, and submedian and apical rings of terminal black, scale-projection slight. Antennae ochreous-whitish, ringed with dark fuscous Thorax pale ochreous, sprinkled with black. Abdomen grey-whitish. Legs whitish, ringed with dark fuscous. Forewings pale ochreous, rather thickly sprinkled with black; plical and first and second discal stigmata elongate, black; cilia on costa whitish-ochreous sprinkled with black, rest ochreous-whitish. Hindwings and cilia grey-whitish. Glen Innes (3000 feet), New South Wales; Mount Gambler, South Australia; in November and December, two specimens.

— Original description by Edward Meyrick
