= Batrachedra velox =

Scientific classification
- Kingdom: Animalia
- Phylum: Arthropoda
- Class: Insecta
- Order: Lepidoptera
- Family: Batrachedridae
- Genus: Batrachedra
- Species: B. velox

Binomial name
- Batrachedra velox Meyrick, 1897

Moth species in family Batrachedridae

Batrachedra velox is a species of moth of the family Batrachedridae. It was described by Edward Meyrick in 1897 and is found in Australia.
