= Batrachedrodes sophroniella =

Scientific classification
- Domain: Eukaryota
- Kingdom: Animalia
- Phylum: Arthropoda
- Class: Insecta
- Order: Lepidoptera
- Family: Momphidae
- Genus: Batrachedrodes
- Species: B. sophroniella

Binomial name
- Batrachedrodes sophroniella (Walsingham, 1907)

Synonyms
- Batrachedra sophroniella Walsingham, 1907; Batrachedra ruficiliata Walsingham, 1907

Moth species in family Momphidae

Batrachedrodes sophroniella is a moth of the family Momphidae. It was first described by Lord Walsingham in 1907. It is endemic to the Hawaiian islands of Oahu, Maui and Hawaii.

The larvae feed at times abundantly on the sporangia of Dryopteris cyatheoides.
