= Batrachedra zonochra =

Scientific classification
- Kingdom: Animalia
- Phylum: Arthropoda
- Class: Insecta
- Order: Lepidoptera
- Family: Batrachedridae
- Genus: Batrachedra
- Species: B. zonochra

Binomial name
- Batrachedra zonochra Lower, 1904

Moth species in family Batrachedridae

Batrachedra zonochra is a species of moth of the family Batrachedridae. It is found in Australia.
