= Batrachedra eurema =

Scientific classification
- Kingdom: Animalia
- Phylum: Arthropoda
- Class: Insecta
- Order: Lepidoptera
- Family: Batrachedridae
- Genus: Batrachedra
- Species: B. eurema

Binomial name
- Batrachedra eurema Bradley, 1956

Moth species in family Batrachedridae

Batrachedra eurema is a species of moth of the family Batrachedridae. It is found on Lord Howe Island between Australia and New Zealand and Guadalcanal north east of Australia.
