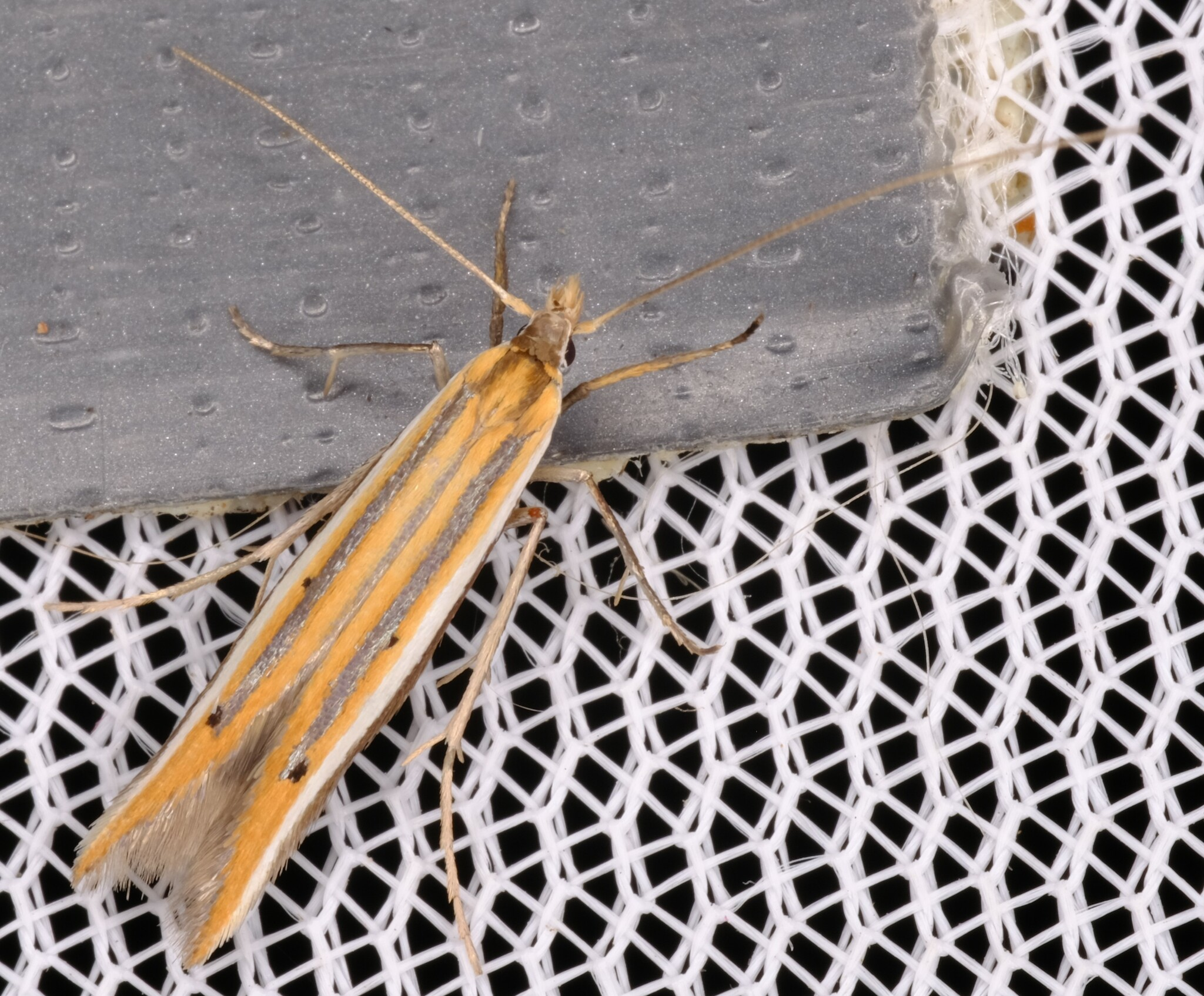

Scientific classification
- Kingdom: Animalia
- Phylum: Arthropoda
- Class: Insecta
- Order: Lepidoptera
- Family: Batrachedridae
- Genus: Batrachedra
- Species: B. trimeris

Binomial name
- Batrachedra trimeris Meyrick, 1897

= Batrachedra trimeris =

Moth species in family Batrachedridae

Batrachedra trimeris is a species of moth in the family Batrachedridae. It is found in Australia.

== Original description ==
Female 9-12 mm. Head white, crown partly ochreous-tinged. Palpi with second joint fuscous, apex white, terminal joint white, apex black, scale-projection short. Antennae pale grey. Thorax ochreous, with two white stripes. Abdomen whitish grey. Legs dark fuscous, posterior pair whitish. Forewings golden-yellow-ochreous; a broad shining white costal streak from base to apex, costal edge dark fuscous; sometimes an ill-defined whitish submedian longitudinal streak; first and second discal stigmata black: cilia light grey, on costa dark grey; Hindwings dark grey; cilia light grey. Perth, West Australia; in October, two specimens.

— Edward Meyrick
