= Coleophora crypsineura =

Scientific classification
- Kingdom: Animalia
- Phylum: Arthropoda
- Class: Insecta
- Order: Lepidoptera
- Family: Coleophoridae
- Genus: Coleophora
- Species: C. crypsineura

Binomial name
- Coleophora crypsineura (Lower, 1900)

Synonyms
- Batrachedra crypsineura Lower, 1900

Species of moth

Coleophora crypsineura is a moth of the family Coleophoridae, first described by Oswald Bertram Lower in 1900 as Batrachedra crypsineura.

It is found in dry and semidry southern Australia from Coonabarabran, New South Wales to Caiguna in Western Australia.

The wingspan is 9–10 mm (0.35–0.39 in).
