= Batrachedra eremochtha =

Scientific classification
- Kingdom: Animalia
- Phylum: Arthropoda
- Class: Insecta
- Order: Lepidoptera
- Family: Batrachedridae
- Genus: Batrachedra
- Species: B. eremochtha

Binomial name
- Batrachedra eremochtha Meyrick, 1897

Moth species in family Batrachedridae

Batrachedra eremochtha is a species of moth of the family Batrachedridae. It is found in Australia.

== Original description ==
Male, 9 mm. Head whitish, crown greyish-tinged. Palpi white, subbasal and subapical rings of second joint, and basal and apical rings of terminal black, scale-projection very slight. Antennae whitish, fuscous-ringed, towards apex with three darker bands. Thorax and abdomen light grey, whitish-sprinkled. Legs dark grey, tarsi whitish-ringed. Forewings grey; an ill-defined whitish longitudinal streak in disc from about middle to near apex; plical stigma minute, black: cilia on costa grey, at apex ochreous-white with a black subbasal mark, beneath whitish-fuscous. Hindwings grey; cilia whitish-fuscous. Albany, West Australia; in October, one specimen.

— Original description by Edward Meyrick
