= Batrachedra leucophyta =

Scientific classification
- Kingdom: Animalia
- Phylum: Arthropoda
- Class: Insecta
- Order: Lepidoptera
- Family: Batrachedridae
- Genus: Batrachedra
- Species: B. leucophyta

Binomial name
- Batrachedra leucophyta Meyrick, 1897

Moth species in family Batrachedridae

Batrachedra leucophyta is a species of moth of the family Batrachedridae. It was described by Edward Meyrick in 1897 and is found in Australia.

== Original description ==
Male, 9 mm. Head, thorax, and abdomen grey-whitish. Palpi dark fuscous, beneath whitish, scale-projection very slight. Antennae whitish, rimmed with dark fuscous. Legs white, banded with dark fuscous. Forewings white, coarsely irrorated with dark grey; cilia white. Hindwings whitish-grey; cilia white. Carnarvon, West Australia; in October, one specimen.

— Edward Meyrick
