= Batrachedra microtoma =

Scientific classification
- Kingdom: Animalia
- Phylum: Arthropoda
- Class: Insecta
- Order: Lepidoptera
- Family: Batrachedridae
- Genus: Batrachedra
- Species: B. microtoma

Binomial name
- Batrachedra microtoma Meyrick, 1897

Moth species in family Batrachedridae

Batrachedra microtoma is a species of moth of the family Batrachedridae. It is found in Australia from southern Queensland to central New South Wales.

Adults are small and grey. They have a few fine dark sports or markings on their forewings.
