= Batrachedra astathma =

Scientific classification
- Kingdom: Animalia
- Phylum: Arthropoda
- Class: Insecta
- Order: Lepidoptera
- Family: Batrachedridae
- Genus: Batrachedra
- Species: B. astathma

Binomial name
- Batrachedra astathma Meyrick, 1897

Moth species in family Batrachedridae

Batrachedra astathma is a species of moth of the family Batrachedridae. It is found in Australia.

== Original description ==
Male, Female 7-9 mm. Head, thorax, and abdomen white. Palpi white, submedian and subapical rings of second joint, and basal and subapical rings of terminal black, scale-projection slight. Antennae whitish, suffused with fuscous above. Legs whitish, ringed with fuscous. Forewings fuscous, suffusedly irrorated with white, with scattered black scales; a suffused white costal streak from base to 2/3 plical and first and second discal stigmata rather large, black; a black apical dot; cilia fuscous-whitish. Hindwings and cilia grey-whitish. Sydney, New South Wales; in September, February, and March, five specimens.

— Original description by Edward Meyrick
