= Batrachedra eustola =

Scientific classification
- Kingdom: Animalia
- Phylum: Arthropoda
- Class: Insecta
- Order: Lepidoptera
- Family: Batrachedridae
- Genus: Batrachedra
- Species: B. eustola

Binomial name
- Batrachedra eustola Meyrick, 1897

Moth species in family Batrachedridae

Batrachedra eustola is a species of moth of the family Batrachedridae. It is found in Australia.

== Original description ==
Male 11 mm. Head white. Palpi with second joint fuscous, apex white, terminal joint short, dark fuscous, apex white, scale projection rather short, loose. Antennae whitish. Thorax ochreous-yellowish, with two white stripes. Abdomen grey-whitish. Legs dark fuscous, posterior pair whitish. Forewings deep yellow; costal, submedian, and dorsal streaks silvery-white; first and second discal stigmata black: cilia whitish. Hindwings pale grey; cilia whitish. Sydney, New South Wales; in September, one specimen.

— Original description by Edward Meyrick
