= Batrachedra diplosema =

Scientific classification
- Kingdom: Animalia
- Phylum: Arthropoda
- Class: Insecta
- Order: Lepidoptera
- Family: Batrachedridae
- Genus: Batrachedra
- Species: B. diplosema

Binomial name
- Batrachedra diplosema Meyrick, 1897

Moth species in family Batrachedridae

Batrachedra diplosema is a species of moth of the family Batrachedridae. It is found in Australia.

== Original description ==
Male, Female 7-8 mm. Head and thorax ochreous, face whitish. Palpi whitish, subapical and apical rings of second joint and median band of terminal black, scale-projection very slight. Antennae whitish, suffusedly ringed with dark fuscous. Abdomen grey, sides white. Legs fuscous, sprinkled with white and ringed with black. Forewings brownish-ochreous, irrorated with dark fuscous; first and second discal stigmata round, black; cilia light fuscous. Hindwings grey; cilia light fuscous. Brisbane, Queensland; in September, two specimens.

— Original description by Edward Meyrick
