= Batrachedra plagiocentra =

Scientific classification
- Kingdom: Animalia
- Phylum: Arthropoda
- Class: Insecta
- Order: Lepidoptera
- Family: Batrachedridae
- Genus: Batrachedra
- Species: B. plagiocentra

Binomial name
- Batrachedra plagiocentra Meyrick, 1897

Moth species in family Batrachedridae

Batrachedra plagiocentra is a species of moth of the family Batrachedridae. It is found in Australia.

== Original description ==
Male, Female 11-15 mm. Head ochreous-white. Palpi fuscous irrorated with black, terminal joint and apex of second white, scale-projection short, Antennae grey. Thorax ochreous-whitish, sides pale brownish. Abdomen grey-whitish. Legs dark fuscous, suffusedly whitish-ringed, middle and posterior tibias suffused with white. Forewings rather dark fuscous, irrorated or much suffused with ochreous-whitish; plical, first and second discal stigmata, and an apical dot black; a white costal spot at ¾; cilia light fuscous, darker and sometimes spotted with white on costa, round apex with a dark fuscous line at tips. Hindwings grey; cilia light fuscous. Sydney, New South Wales; Georges Bay, Tasmania; Geraldton, West Australia; in September, November, and January, four specimens.

— Edward Meyrick
