= Batrachedra megalodoxa =

Scientific classification
- Kingdom: Animalia
- Phylum: Arthropoda
- Class: Insecta
- Order: Lepidoptera
- Family: Batrachedridae
- Genus: Batrachedra
- Species: B. megalodoxa

Binomial name
- Batrachedra megalodoxa Meyrick, 1897

Moth species in family Batrachedridae

Batrachedra megalodoxa is a species of moth of the family Batrachedridae. It is found in Australia.

== Original description ==
Male, Female 16-17 mm. Head whitish-ochreous. Palpi dark fuscous, irrorated with whitish-ochreous, terminal joint with pale basal band, scale-projection slight. Antennae whitish-ochreous, indistinctly ringed with dark fuscous. Thorax whitish-ochreous irrorated with fuscous. Abdomen whitish-ochreous. Legs dark fuscous, irrorated with whitish-ochreous. Forewings whitish-ochreous irrorated with fuscous or dark fuscous, posterior third of costa and termen spotted with pale and dark; plical and second discal stigmata elongate, black; cilia pale fuscous. Hindwings pale grey irrorated with dark grey; cilia pale fuscous. Rosewood, Queensland; in September, two specimens.

— Edward Meyrick
