= Batrachedra helarcha =

Scientific classification
- Kingdom: Animalia
- Phylum: Arthropoda
- Class: Insecta
- Order: Lepidoptera
- Family: Batrachedridae
- Genus: Batrachedra
- Species: B. helarcha

Binomial name
- Batrachedra helarcha Meyrick, 1897

Moth species in family Batrachedridae

Batrachedra helarcha is a species of moth of the family Batrachedridae. It is found in Australia.

== Original description ==
Male, Female 8–12 mm. Head white, crown usually pale greyish-ochreous posteriorly. Palpi whitish, subbasal and subapical rings of second and terminal joints blackish, scale-projection very slight. Antennae whitish, obscurely ringed and sometimes suffused with fuscous. Thorax and abdomen white, sprinkled with pale grey. Legs whitish, ringed with pale fuscous. Forewings pale greyish-ochreous, sprinkled with fuscous; veins more or less obscurely and variably streaked with whitish and sprinkled with black; first and second discal stigmata linear, black; a black apical dot; cilia on costa ochreous-whitish, at apex fuscous, beneath whitish-fuscous. Hindwings grey; cilia whitish-fuscous. Brisbane, Queensland; Sydney, New South Wales; Deloraine and Georges Bay, Tasmania; from September to January, amongst Juncus in swampy places, fourteen specimens.

— Original description by Edward Meyrick
