= Batrachedra volucris =

Scientific classification
- Kingdom: Animalia
- Phylum: Arthropoda
- Class: Insecta
- Order: Lepidoptera
- Family: Batrachedridae
- Genus: Batrachedra
- Species: B. volucris

Binomial name
- Batrachedra volucris Meyrick, 1897

Moth species in family Batrachedridae

Batrachedra volucris is a species of moth of the family Batrachedridae. It is found in Australia.

== Original description ==
Male, Female 14-15 mm. Head, thorax, and abdomen whitish-fuscous. Palpi whitish-fuscous, irrorated with dark fuscous, scale-projection distinct. Antennae whitish-fuscous, indistinctly darker-ringed. Legs dark fuscous, irrorated and ringed with whitish-fuscous. Forewings light fuscous, sprinkled with dark fuscous, and with a few whitish scales; plical and first and second discal stigmata small, blackish; a blackish apical dot; cilia whitish-fuscous. Hindwings light grey; cilia whitish fuscous. Sydney, New South Wales; in October and March, two specimens.

— Edward Meyrick
