= Batrachedra sterilis =

Scientific classification
- Kingdom: Animalia
- Phylum: Arthropoda
- Class: Insecta
- Order: Lepidoptera
- Family: Batrachedridae
- Genus: Batrachedra
- Species: B. sterilis

Binomial name
- Batrachedra sterilis Meyrick, 1897

Moth species in family Batrachedridae

Batrachedra sterilis is a species of moth of the family Batrachedridae. It is found in Australia.

== Original description ==
Male, Female 10-14 mm. Head ochreous-white. Palpi white, median and subapical bands on second joint and sometimes a median ring on terminal black, scale-projection distinct. Antennae whitish-ochreous, ringed with dark fuscous Thorax ochreous-whitish, sprinkled with dark fuscous. Abdomen grey-whitish. Legs ochreous-whitish, banded with dark fuscous. Forewings whitish, irrorated with dark fuscous, more densely toward dorsum; plical stigma linear, first discal seldom defined, second dot-like, sometimes connected with first by a slender streak, and two oblique costal striguae before apex blackish, all sometimes partially obsolete or obscured by the dark irroration; cilia above apex whitish with a blackish median line, beneath whitish-fuscous. Hindwings grey; cilia whitish-fuscous. Sydney, New South Wales; Mount Macedon, Victoria; Launceston and Hobart, Tasmania; September to February, twenty-two specimens.

— Edward Meyrick
