= Batrachedra lygropis =

Scientific classification
- Kingdom: Animalia
- Phylum: Arthropoda
- Class: Insecta
- Order: Lepidoptera
- Family: Batrachedridae
- Genus: Batrachedra
- Species: B. lygropis

Binomial name
- Batrachedra lygropis Herrich-Schäffer, 1853

Moth species in family Batrachedridae

Batrachedra lygropis is a species of moth of the family Batrachedridae. It was described by Gottlieb August Wilhelm Herrich-Schäffer in 1853 and is found in Australia.
