= Batrachedra satirica =

Scientific classification
- Kingdom: Animalia
- Phylum: Arthropoda
- Class: Insecta
- Order: Lepidoptera
- Family: Batrachedridae
- Genus: Batrachedra
- Species: B. satirica

Binomial name
- Batrachedra satirica Meyrick, 1917

Moth species in family Batrachedridae

Batrachedra satirica is a species of moth of the family Batrachedridae. It is found in Australia.

== Original description ==
Male 10-11 mm. Head and palpi ochreous-whitish. Antennae greyish. Thorax fuscous. Abdomen grey, anal tuft grey-whitish. Forewings very narrow, obtuse-pointed; fuscous, irrorated with darker; cilia light grey, on costa and at apex whitish, on costa with four black dots, at apex with a dark fuscous subbasal line. Hindwings grey; cilia light grey. Queensland, Cairns, in October and November (Dodd); two specimens.

— Edward Meyrick
