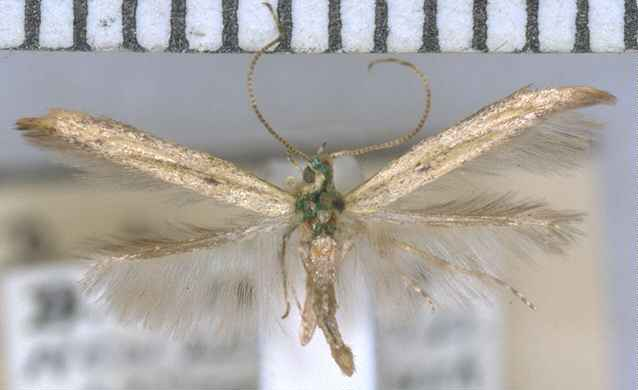

Scientific classification
- Kingdom: Animalia
- Phylum: Arthropoda
- Clade: Pancrustacea
- Class: Insecta
- Order: Lepidoptera
- Family: Batrachedridae
- Genus: Batrachedra
- Species: B. arenosella

Binomial name
- Batrachedra arenosella (Walker, 1864)

Synonyms
- Gracilaria arenosella Walker, 1864; Batrachedra psilopa Meyrick, 1907

= Batrachedra arenosella =

Moth species in family Batrachedridae

Batrachedra arenosella, the armoured scale eating caterpillar or the coconut moth, is a species of moth of the family Batrachedridae. It was first described by Francis Walker using specimens collected in Auckland, New Zealand. It has been hypothesised that the New Zealand moth may contain two distinct species. As well as the moth species in New Zealand, this name has been applied, perhaps incorrectly, to moths found in India, Indonesia, the Malay Peninsula, and Réunion, as well as in Australia, from the Northern Territory and northern Queensland to New South Wales and South Australia.

== Taxonomy ==
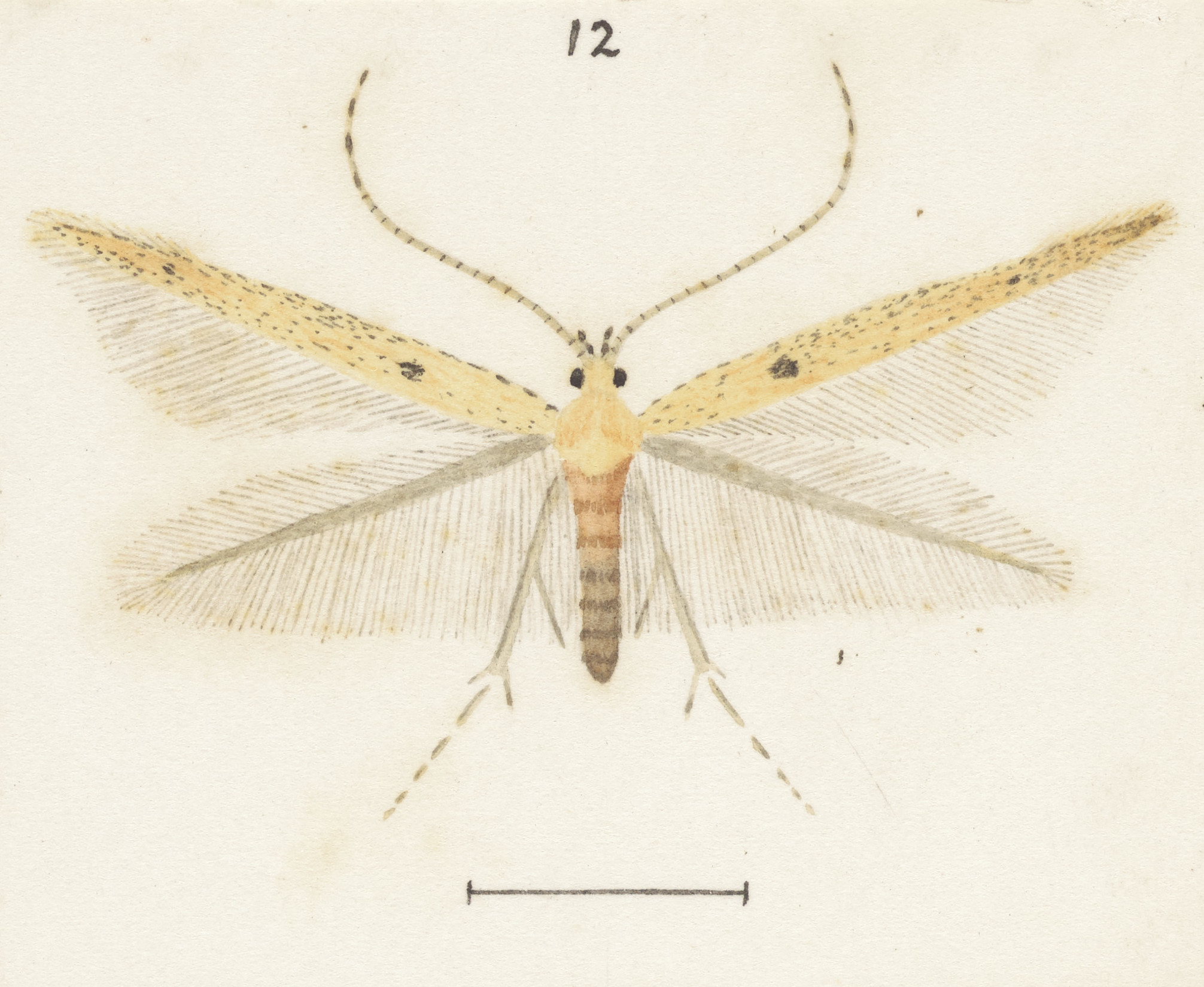
Illustration of female.

B. arenosella was first described by Francis Walker in 1864 using specimens collected in Auckland, New Zealand by Daniel Bolton. From 1924 this species name was also applied to moth species found in south east asian countries as well as in Australasia that are known to ingest the flowers of coconut trees. The application of this name to these moths has been argued to be incorrect as the New Zealand species is known to feed on scale insects. However the New Zealand moth species itself may well contain two separate species as larvae have been recorded as feeding not just on scale insects but have also been reared on the seed heads of Cyperus ustulatus.

The syntype series of specimens upon which Walker based his description can no longer be found in the Natural History Museum, London and none of the specimens held by that museum are from the original type locality. Having investigated the specimens that are held by the Natural History Museum, John S. Dugdale was of the opinion that the genitalia of the New Zealand female specimens differ from the female Queensland specimen held by that institution.

== Description ==
Walker originally described this species as follows:

Female. Pale cinereous fawn-colour, very slender. Antennae long, shorter than the fore wings. Abdomen extending for its whole length beyond the hind wings. Legs long, slender. Wings with a very long fringe. Fore wings narrow, acute, thinly and very minutely brown-speckled; a small brown dot in the disk at one-third of the length. Hind wings cinereous, extremely narrow. Length of the body 3 lines; of the wings 8 lines.

== Hosts ==
In New Zealand Dr J. G. Myers reported the larvae of this species feeding on a species of scale insect, Poliaspis media. Whereas Edward Meyrick reported the larvae of this species feeding amongst the seeds of species in the genus Juncus in August. The larvae were observed forming a web like shelter from which they fed. The larvae of the south east asian moths have been reported damaging flowers of coconut trees.
