= Batrachedra ditrota =

Scientific classification
- Kingdom: Animalia
- Phylum: Arthropoda
- Class: Insecta
- Order: Lepidoptera
- Family: Batrachedridae
- Genus: Batrachedra
- Species: B. ditrota

Binomial name
- Batrachedra ditrota Meyrick, 1897

Moth species in family Batrachedridae

Batrachedra ditrota is a species of moth of the family Batrachedridae. It is found in Australia.

== Original description ==
Male, Female 13-15 mm. Head, antennae, thorax, and abdomen fuscous Palpi whitish fuscous, apical ring of second joint and five rings of terminal black, scale-projection very slight. Legs dark fuscous, sprinkled with ochreous-whitish. Forewings fuscous, irrorated with dark fuscous; first and sometimes second discal stigma round, black; a black apical dot; cilia fuscous. Hindwings and cilia fuscous. Launceston and Deloraine, Tasmania; in November and December, three specimens.

— Original description by Edward Meyrick
