= Batrachedra phorcydia =

Scientific classification
- Kingdom: Animalia
- Phylum: Arthropoda
- Class: Insecta
- Order: Lepidoptera
- Family: Batrachedridae
- Genus: Batrachedra
- Species: B. phorcydia

Binomial name
- Batrachedra phorcydia Meyrick, 1897

Moth species in family Batrachedridae

Batrachedra phorcydia is a species of moth of the family Batrachedridae. It is found in Australia.

== Original description ==
Male, 11 mm. Head, palpi, antennae, thorax, abdomen, and legs dark grey, finely irrorated with white; scale-projection of palpi very slight. Forewings dark grey, finely irrorated with white; a black median basal dot; first discal stigma elongate, blackish; cilia light grey, irrorated with whitish. Hindwings grey; cilia light grey. Geraldton, West Australia; in November, one specimen.

— Edward Meyrick
