= Batrachedra liopis =

Scientific classification
- Kingdom: Animalia
- Phylum: Arthropoda
- Class: Insecta
- Order: Lepidoptera
- Family: Batrachedridae
- Genus: Batrachedra
- Species: B. liopis

Binomial name
- Batrachedra liopis Meyrick, 1897

Moth species in family Batrachedridae

Batrachedra liopis is a species of moth of the family Batrachedridae. It is found in Australia.

== Original description ==
Female 15-17 mm. Head, palpi, antennae, thorax, abdomen, and legs whitish-ochreous, brownish-tinged; scale-projection of palpi forming a short tuft. Fore wings whitish-ochreous suffused with pale brownish, more strongly towards apex; costal edge suffused with white from middle to 3/4 plical and first and second discal stigmata small, black; cilia on costa white, round apex and beneath pale fuscous. Hindwings and cilia light grey. Sydney, New South Wales, in March; Campbelltown, Tasmania; in December, two specimens.

— Edward Meyrick
