= Batrachedra epixantha =

Scientific classification
- Kingdom: Animalia
- Phylum: Arthropoda
- Class: Insecta
- Order: Lepidoptera
- Family: Batrachedridae
- Genus: Batrachedra
- Species: B. epixantha

Binomial name
- Batrachedra epixantha Meyrick, 1897

Moth species in family Batrachedridae

Batrachedra epixantha is a species of moth of the family Batrachedridae. It is found in Australia.

== Original description ==
Male, Female 9-11 mm. Head ochreous-yellow. Palpi yellowish, terminal joint dark fuscous, scale-projection very slight. Antennae grey, ringed with black. Thorax ochreous-yellow, sometimes suffused with fuscous. Abdomen grey. Legs dark fuscous, posterior pair ochreous-whitish. Forewings deep ochreous-yellow, costal half suffused with rather dark fuscous except towards costa posteriorly; plical and second discal stigmata black; cilia fuscous, darker round apex. Hindwings dark grey; cilia grey. Sydney, New South Wales; Albany, West Australia; in September, October, and March, five specimens.

— Original description by Edward Meyrick
