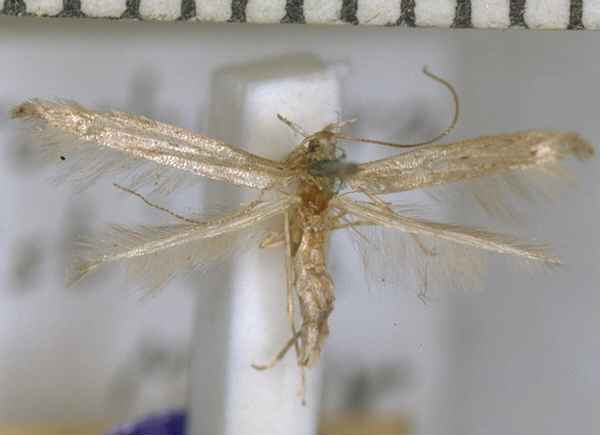
- Female lectotype

Scientific classification
- Kingdom: Animalia
- Phylum: Arthropoda
- Clade: Pancrustacea
- Class: Insecta
- Order: Lepidoptera
- Family: Batrachedridae
- Genus: Batrachedra
- Species: B. tristicta

Binomial name
- Batrachedra tristicta Meyrick, 1901

Synonyms
- Batrachedra tristictica (Meyrick, 1901)

= Batrachedra tristicta =

Moth species in family Batrachedridae

Batrachedra tristicta is a species of moth in the family Batrachedridae. It is endemic to New Zealand and has been found in both the North and South Islands. The larvae feel on the flowers and seed heads of rushes in the genus Juncus. The adults of this species are on the wing in March.

== Taxonomy ==
This species was first described by Edward Meyrick in 1901 using material collected at Makatoku, in the Hawkes Bay, in March. George Hudson discussed and illustrated this species both in his 1928 publication The Butterflies and Moths of New Zealand and his 1939 supplement to that work. The lectotype specimen is held at the Natural History Museum, London.

== Description ==
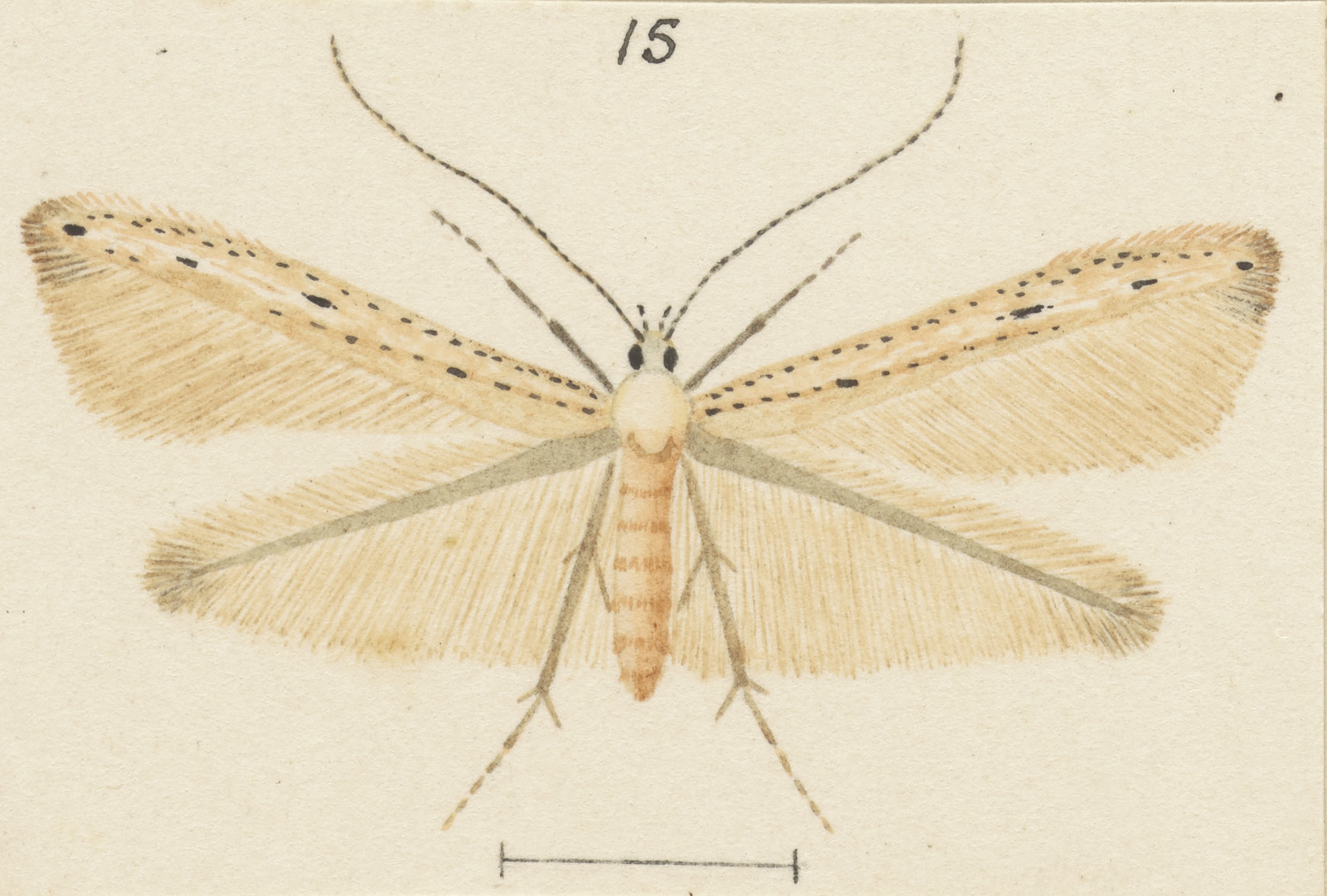
B. tristicta illustrated by George Hudson.

Meyrick described B. tristicta as follows:

♂︎♀︎. 10-11 m.m. Head, antennae, thorax, abdomen, and legs fuscous-whitish. Palpi whitish, second joint with short scale-projection, subbasal and subapical spots of second joint, and basal and subapical spots of terminal dark fuscous. Fore wings whitish, irrorated with fuscous and sprinkled with dark fuscous; first and second discal stigmata elongate, black, first somewhat before middle; a round black apical dot : cilia very pale whitish-fuscous. Hind-wings grey; cilia pale whitish-fuscous.

== Distribution ==
This species is endemic to New Zealand. Along with the type locality in the Hawkes Bay, this species has also been collected in Fiordland.

== Biology and behaviour ==
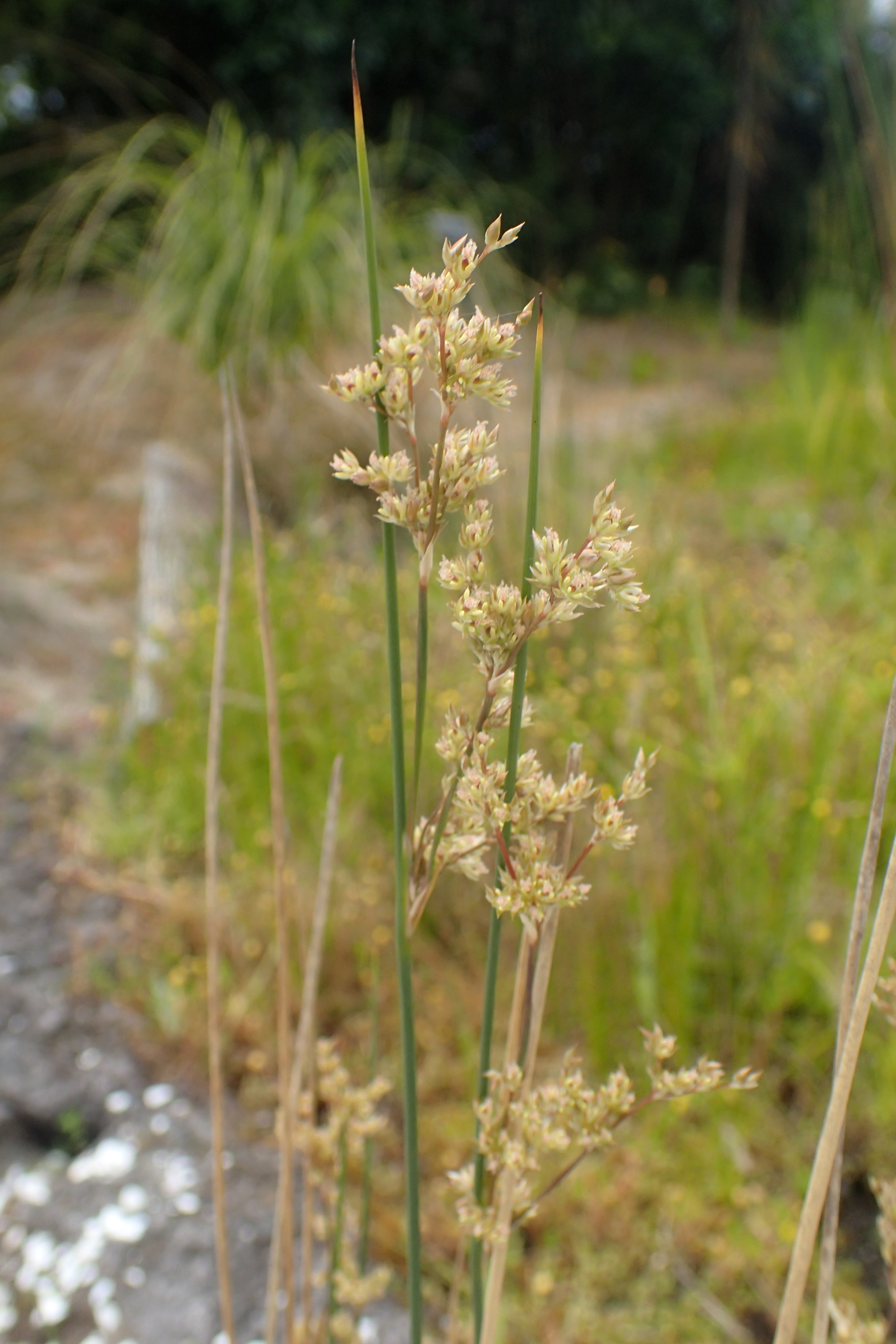
Juncus edgariae

The adults of this species are on the wing in March.

== Host species ==
The larvae feed on the flowers and seed heads of rushes, including wīwī (Juncus edgariae) and the introduced soft rush (Juncus effusus).
