= Batrachedra silignea =

Scientific classification
- Kingdom: Animalia
- Phylum: Arthropoda
- Class: Insecta
- Order: Lepidoptera
- Family: Batrachedridae
- Genus: Batrachedra
- Species: B. silignea

Binomial name
- Batrachedra silignea Turner, 1923

Moth species in family Batrachedridae

Batrachedra silignea is a species of moth of the family Batrachedridae. It is found in Australia.
