= Batrachedra hypoxutha =

Scientific classification
- Kingdom: Animalia
- Phylum: Arthropoda
- Clade: Pancrustacea
- Class: Insecta
- Order: Lepidoptera
- Family: Batrachedridae
- Genus: Batrachedra
- Species: B. hypoxutha

Binomial name
- Batrachedra hypoxutha Meyrick, 1897

Moth species in family Batrachedridae

Batrachedra hypoxutha is a species of moth of the family Batrachedridae. It is found in Australia.

== Original description ==
Female 11–12 mm. Head, thorax, and abdomen whitish-ochreous. Palpi white, second joint with very oblique ochreous or fuscous subapical band, scale-projection slight. Antennae white, ringed with brown. Legs dark fuscous, suffusedly banded with whitish. Forewings yellow-brown; costal edge suffusedly white; cilia light brownish. Hindwings grey; cilia light brownish. Brisbane and Rosewood, Queensland; Sydney, New South Wales; in September and December, three specimens.

— Original description by Edward Meyrick
