= Batrachedra mylephata =

Scientific classification
- Kingdom: Animalia
- Phylum: Arthropoda
- Class: Insecta
- Order: Lepidoptera
- Family: Batrachedridae
- Genus: Batrachedra
- Species: B. mylephata

Binomial name
- Batrachedra mylephata Meyrick, 1897

Moth species in family Batrachedridae

Batrachedra mylephata is a species of moth of the family Batrachedridae. It is found in Australia.

== Original description ==
Male, 13-14 mm. Head white. Palpi white, basal, median, and subapical bands of second joint, and median ring of terminal blackish, scale-projection tuft-like, nearly as long as terminal joint. Antennae white, fuscous-ringed. Thorax white, sometimes fuscous-sprinkled. Abdomen whitish. Legs whitish, spotted with dark fuscous. Forewings white, irrorated with fuscous and dark fuscous; plical stigma linear, first and second discal rather elongate or dot-like, blackish; cilia above apex whitish with a dark fuscous median line, beneath whitish-fuscous. Hindwings grey; cilia whitish-fuscous. Brisbane, Queensland; in September, two specimens.

— Edward Meyrick
