= Batrachedra holochlora =

Scientific classification
- Kingdom: Animalia
- Phylum: Arthropoda
- Class: Insecta
- Order: Lepidoptera
- Family: Batrachedridae
- Genus: Batrachedra
- Species: B. holochlora

Binomial name
- Batrachedra holochlora Meyrick, 1897

Moth species in family Batrachedridae

Batrachedra holochlora is a species of moth of the family Batrachedridae. It is found in Australia.

== Original description ==
Female 16 mm. Head, palpi, antennne, thorax, abdomen, and legs ochreous-white; scale-projection of palpi very slight. Forewings ochreous-whitish, somewhat sprinkled suffusedly with ochreous; first and second discal stigmata round, dark fuscous; a minute dark fuscous apical dot; cilia whitish. Hindwings grey-whitish; cilia ochreous-whitish. Sydney, New South Wales; in December, one specimen.

— Original description by Edward Meyrick
