= Batrachedra notocapna =

Scientific classification
- Kingdom: Animalia
- Phylum: Arthropoda
- Class: Insecta
- Order: Lepidoptera
- Family: Batrachedridae
- Genus: Batrachedra
- Species: B. notocapna

Binomial name
- Batrachedra notocapna Turner, 1939

Moth species in family Batrachedridae

Batrachedra notocapna is a species of moth of the family Batrachedridae. It is found in Australia.
