= Scythris hologramma =

Scientific classification
- Kingdom: Animalia
- Phylum: Arthropoda
- Class: Insecta
- Order: Lepidoptera
- Family: Scythrididae
- Genus: Scythris
- Species: S. hologramma

Binomial name
- Scythris hologramma (Lower, 1899)

Synonyms
- Batrachedra hologramma Lower, 1899

Species of moth

Scythris hologramma is a moth in the family Scythrididae. It is found in Australia (including New South Wales).
