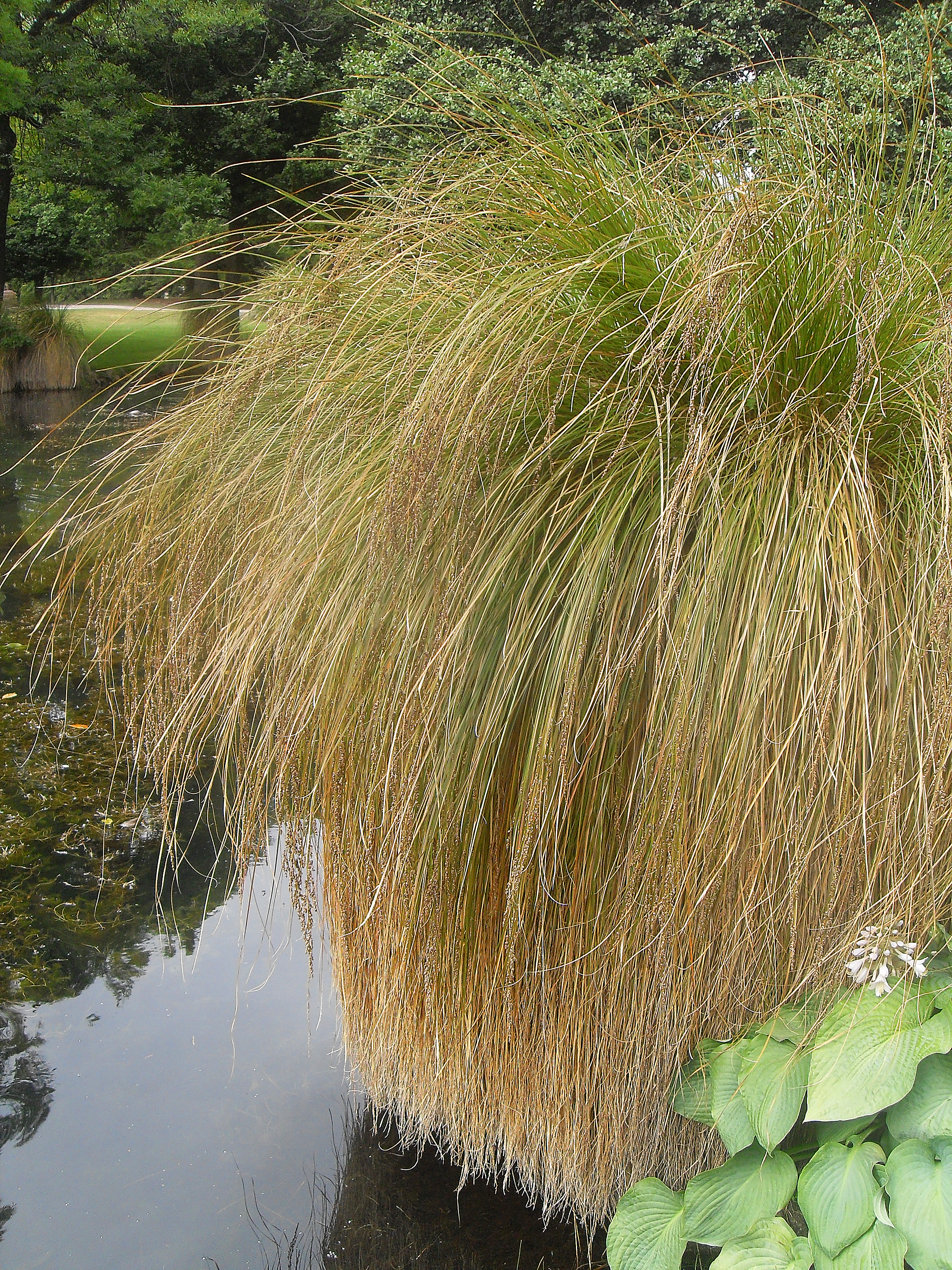
- C. Secta in Queenstown Gardens

Scientific classification
- Kingdom: Plantae
- Clade: Tracheophytes
- Clade: Angiosperms
- Clade: Monocots
- Clade: Commelinids
- Order: Poales
- Family: Cyperaceae
- Genus: Carex
- Species: C. secta

Binomial name
- Carex secta Boott

= Carex secta =

Species of grass-like plant

Carex secta is a sedge from the Cyperaceae family that is endemic to New Zealand. It grows in wetlands. Its Māori names include pūrei, pukio and makura.

== Description ==
The genus Carex is Latin for sedge and the species secta means cut or divided, which refers to the divided flower head. Sedges are visually similar to grasses and rushes but botanically different. Carex secta is a perennial monocotyledon.

Carex secta plants can grow up to 3 meters tall. The base of the plant can form a clumpy trunk-like structure, measuring up to 1 meter in height and 50 cm in diameter. This structure is made up of matted rhizomes, old culms, which are a structure made of older aerial stems, old rhizomes and roots. These clumps are usually pale to dark brown in colour.

Other identifying features include plant leaves that are triangular in shape. The leaves are very narrow, being 1.5–7 mm wide. They have a simple leaf margin and are rough to the touch at the edges. The leaves are usually longer than or equal in length to the flowers, and are pale to light green to yellow green in colour. The leaf is channeled (grooved running along the leaf) and very scabrid (having a rough surface).

Flower stems, much like the leaves, are drooping, triangular in appearance and abrasive to the touch. These drooping culms (stems that hold the fruit) are 0.25-1m tall. Flowers are formed on a loosely branching panicle that measures up to 45 centimetres long. The panicle has numerous pale brown spikes that are mostly grouped at the tips of slender branchlets. These small spikelets at the branchlet ends contain both male and female flowers, with the male flowers positioned closer to the tips of each spike and the female flowers sitting further down the panicle, containing two stigmas. The fruit is a triangular or lens-shaped nut with a short beak that is 2.5–3 mm in length and 1.5 mm wide. The utricle (a sac that surrounds the fruit) is 2-5mm, dark brown with minor winged margins, and contains two stigmas.

== Range ==
Up to 2000 varieties of Carex can be found in cold and temperate climates as well as on tropical mountain ranges worldwide. Within New Zealand, there are 100 species and of those 79 are endemic species. Carex secta is one of those endemic species.

Carex secta can tolerate a wide variety of living conditions. This species can be found all over New Zealand, in both the North and South Islands as well as Stewart Island. Within this area, Carex secta can be found from coastal to mountainous areas usually up to 400 meters above sea level. Carex secta can also be found on mainland Chatham Island, although is relatively rare there.

== Habitat ==
In New Zealand, sedges are a very common type of swamp plant, and the Carex family includes the largest sedges. Carex secta plants thrive in open water environments, which can include swamps, rivers, lakes, ponds, and streams. Carex secta growth is not inhibited when its roots are saturated, and it can tolerate being waterlogged year-round. Carex secta much prefers water depths between 10 and 30 cm which provide the optimal conditions for growth. When naturally dispersed seeds germinate in water depths greater than 30 cm, there is an increase in shoot height of the plant but a decrease in the shoot density. Due to the ability of Carex secta to flourish with saturated roots, they are frequently found in riparian planting margins across the country. Although Carex secta typically grows well in wetlands, it can also do well in drier environments. Carex secta are best suited in moist to wet soils. These soils which typically occur in wetlands are generally organic soils or organic peaty soils. Wetlands on the West Coast with a pH between 5.7 and 6.0 provide ideal growth conditions for Carex secta. In these areas, it can succeed in much deeper water, up to 0.6 metres deep and form colonies with Carex coriacea.

At the head of the Gorge River in South Westland, which is about 700 metres above sea level, Carex secta is found above its typical altitude range. It occupies a much shallower habitat in peat soils at this higher elevation. In the Copland Valley, also in South Westland, Carex secta can be found growing at 450 meters above sea level in swamps where geothermal activity occurs nearby.

== Ecology ==
=== Life cycle/phenology ===
Carex secta flowers from late September to early December; this can slightly vary depending on environmental conditions. It will typically fruit between October and March, ripening in the later months before being dispersed. The seeds are dispersed via multiple methods: granivory (dispersal via seed predators’ consumption), anemochory (dispersal of seeds via wind), and hydrochory (dispersal via water).

Germination of the seeds is dependent on the temperature, taking 3–4 weeks in summer (warmer conditions) and slower in colder conditions. The seeds remain viable in the soil for a long time. Because of this, when vegetation is cleared in wetlands, allowing light to reach ground level, the seeds will germinate in mass. Although there have been no specific studies investigating the longevity of Carex secta seeds, studies conducted on the Carex genus in the seed bank suggest that some species of Carex seeds are viable for up to 130 years.

=== Predators, parasites and diseases ===
Carex secta has multiple endemic species of Lepidoptera (moths) and endemic Hemiptera (true bugs) that feed on it. The Lepidoptera species (in their larval (caterpillar) stage) feed on the flowers/stems/blades of Carex secta. These species include Diplopseustis perieresalis, Orocrambus angustipennis, Tmetolophota sulcana, Sagephora exsanguis, Megacraspedus sp.. The Hemiptera species that feed on the leaves and seeds of the Carex secta include Rhopalimorpha obscura and Rhopalimorpha lineolaris.

It is likely that Moa were a herbivore of Carex species in New Zealand as there has been evidence of Carex, Phormium, and Teucridium seed found in Moa gizzard remains. Where soil and environmental conditions allow, wilding pines (e.g., Pinus radiata), Scotch broom (Cytisus scoparius), Willow species (Salix spp.) and blackberry (Rubus fruticosus) species frequently outcompete native plants, such as Carex secta. willows are a particular threat to the habitat of Carex secta. The spread of invasive willows, with their large canopies, prevents light from reaching the ground level which limits the opportunities for the growth of Carex secta in what would otherwise be their ideal habitat.

== Similar species ==
Carex sectoides, which is another species of Carex endemic to New Zealand, had previously been synonymised with Carex secta. This species resides on two of New Zealand's offshore islands, the Chatham Islands and the Antipodes, a cluster of volcanic islands that are 860 km to the southeast of Stewart Island. The two species were separated in 1970 by Elizabeth Edgar. Carex sectoides is far less common than Carex secta, which is widespread on both the North and South Islands as well as Stewart Island.

Carex secta has also often been confused with Carex virgata because C. virgata can grow raised trunks formed by matted rhizomes and old culms, very similar to the form of Carex secta. The distinguishing characteristics of C. virgata is that plants can only reach a maximum height of 1.2 meters, which is significantly less than C. secta. The Carex virgata inflorescences are clearly branched and never droop, as the panicle remains rigid and with the basal branchlets often further apart.

Whilst many native and endemic plants to New Zealand are in various states of decline, as of 2012 Carex secta is not a threatened plant species. However, Carex tenuiculmis, a close relative of the Carex secta that also grows in wetlands, is considered to be more vulnerable. This species can be distinguished from Carex secta by its red leaves and shorter inflorescence. It is far less abundant than Carex secta and is considered to be at risk – declining.

== Cultural uses ==
The leaves of Carex secta were used as thatch for the roofing of structures. Māori had a proverb that described Carex secta: "He pūreirei whakamatuatanga. A faithful fatherly tuft of rushes.". The proverb referred to Carex secta as a trustworthy and reliable place where you could stop to rest during your journey across the swampy lands.

Other uses for Carex secta include ornamental gardening, with it often being included in home gardens and landscape architecture.

== Sustainability ==
Carex secta is a highly important species in the sustainable management of waterways in New Zealand. It provides multiple benefits to these highly crucial areas that flow across the landscape. One of the key benefits Carex secta provides is the stabilization of banks alongside streams; its extensive root system holds the soil together which prevents the banks from continuously eroding. Another benefit stemming from the presence of Carex secta in waterways is the enhancement of water quality due to the reduction in sediment runoff from agriculture practices. The drooping form of the leaves of Carex secta provides an additional benefit of shading over the water, helping to reduce eutrophication (which can be a major issue in some waterways).

The tussock form of Carex secta, raised above the water, provides excellent shelter and nesting sites for ground birds. Zapornia pusilla (Baillon's crake) is one of the bird species that nests within the plant. Another species that has been recorded nesting in Carex secta is Botaurus poiciloptilus (Australasian bittern).

Carex secta plants provide refuge for lizards from predators as well as offering them shade. Insects have also been found to use Carex secta as camouflage to avoid predation.

== Gallery ==
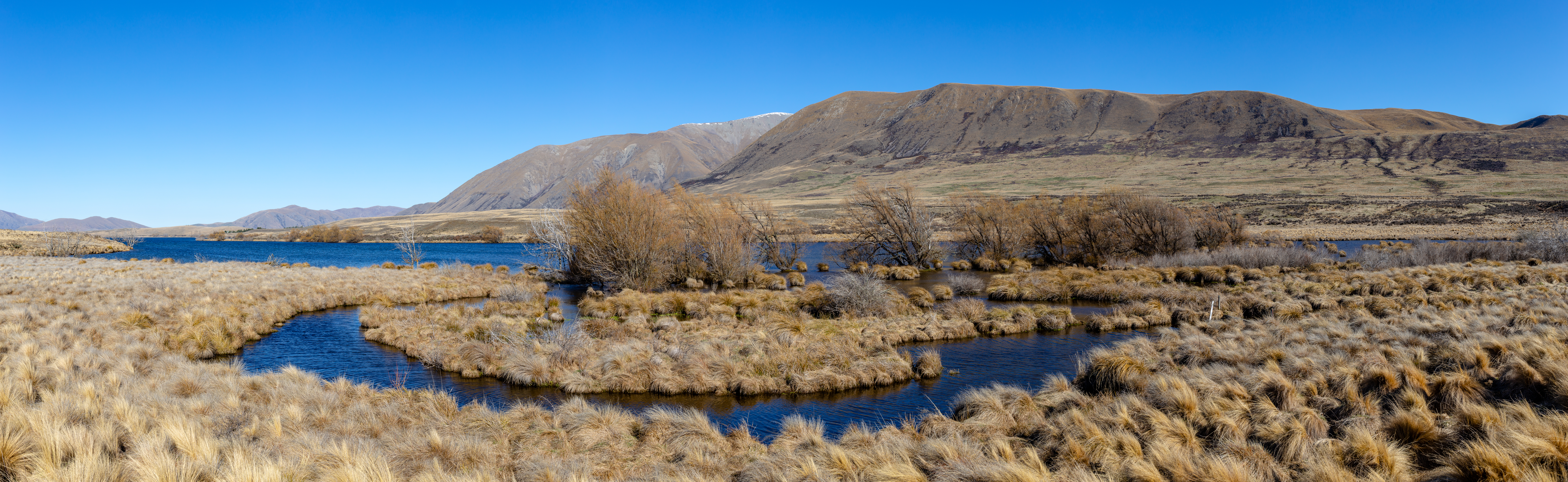
Carex secta growing at the western end of Lake Clearwater in Canterbury, New Zealand
