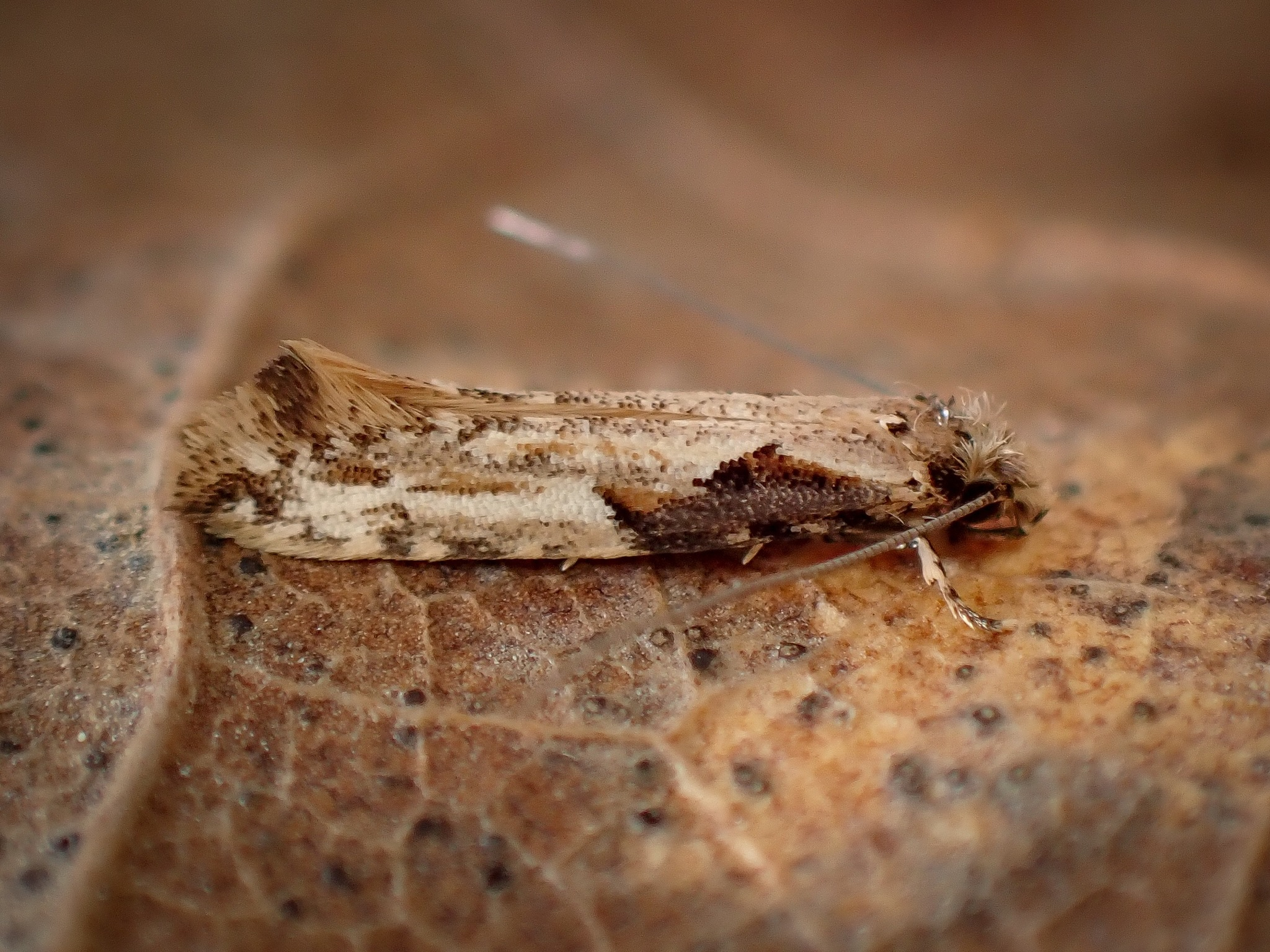

Scientific classification
- Kingdom: Animalia
- Phylum: Arthropoda
- Clade: Pancrustacea
- Class: Insecta
- Order: Lepidoptera
- Family: Tineidae
- Genus: Crypsitricha
- Species: C. pharotoma

Binomial name
- Crypsitricha pharotoma (Meyrick, 1888)

Synonyms
- Endophthora pharotoma Meyrick, 1888

= Crypsitricha pharotoma =

Species of moth endemic to New Zealand

Crypsitricha pharotoma is a species of moth in the family Tineidae. It was first described by Edward Meyrick in 1888. This species is endemic to New Zealand and is found in the North and South Islands. Adults are on the wing from September until March. They are attracted to light and can be observed on tree trunks.

== Taxonomy ==
This species was first described by Edward Meyrick in 1888 and originally named Endophthora pharotoma. Meyrick placed this species in the genus Crypsitricha in 1915. George Hudson discussed and illustrated this species under the name Crypsitricha pharotoma in his 1924 book The butterflies and moths of New Zealand. Alfred Philpott studied the male genitalia of this species in 1927. The male lectotype, collected by Whangārei Heads by Meyrick, is held at the Natural History Museum, London.

== Dscription ==
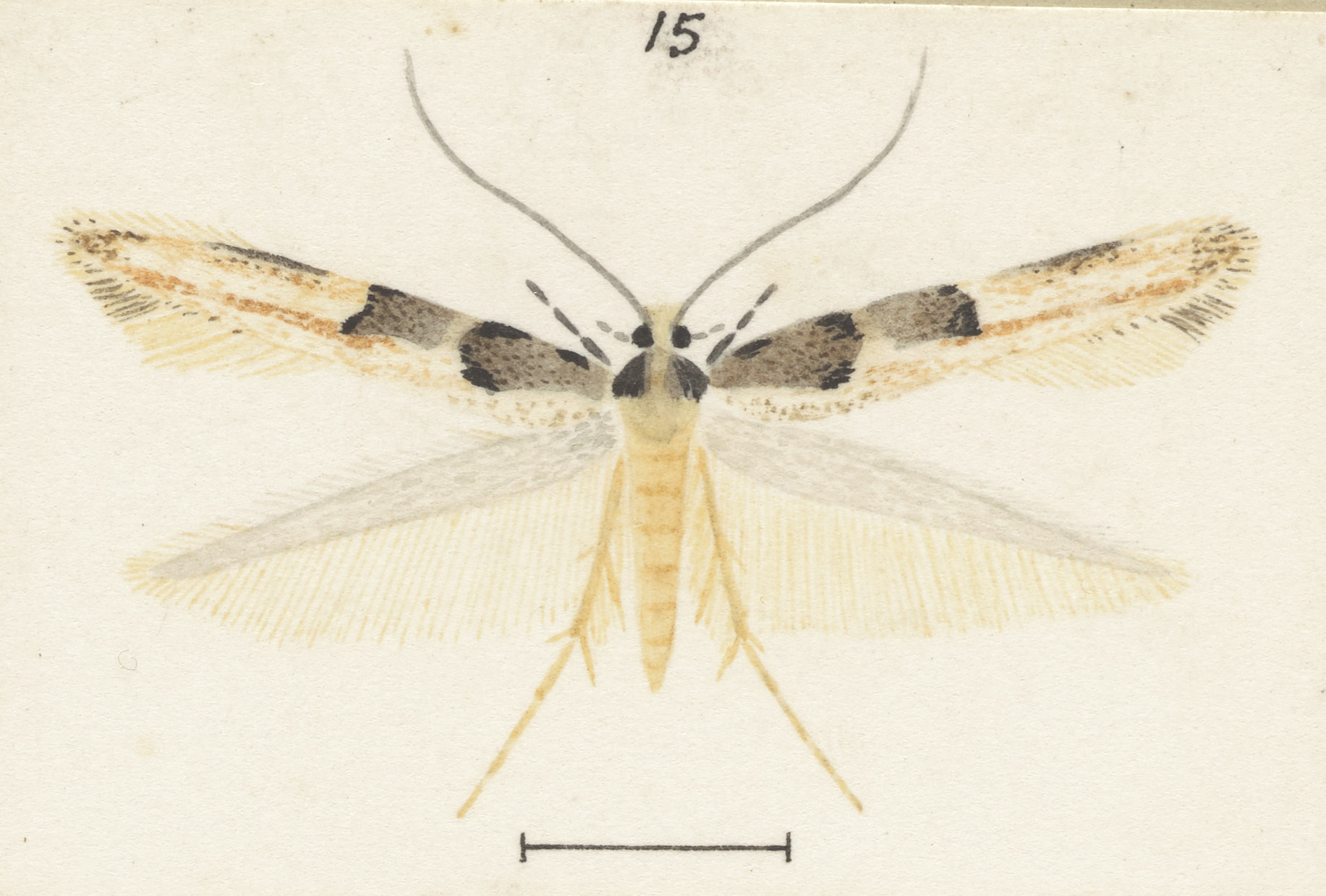
Illustration of female.

The wingspan is 8–10 mm. The forewings are light brownish-ochreous, more or less suffused with whitish-ochreous, and with a few dark fuscous scales, as well as a rather dark fuscous elongate-triangular blotch extending along the costa from the base to before the middle, reaching about half across the wing, marked with a black spot at the apex and three black spots on the costa. There is a blackish mark in the disc before the middle, connected with this beneath the costa, followed by an obscure ochreous-whitish bar. There is sometimes a blackish mark in the disc beyond the middle. The posterior half of the costa is obscurely dotted with whitish and dark fuscous and some dark fuscous and black scales form obscure spots on the hindmargin. The hindwings are whitish-grey.

This species has been confused with Sagephora phortegella.

== Distribution ==
This species is endemic to New Zealand and is found in the North and South Islands.

== Behaviour ==
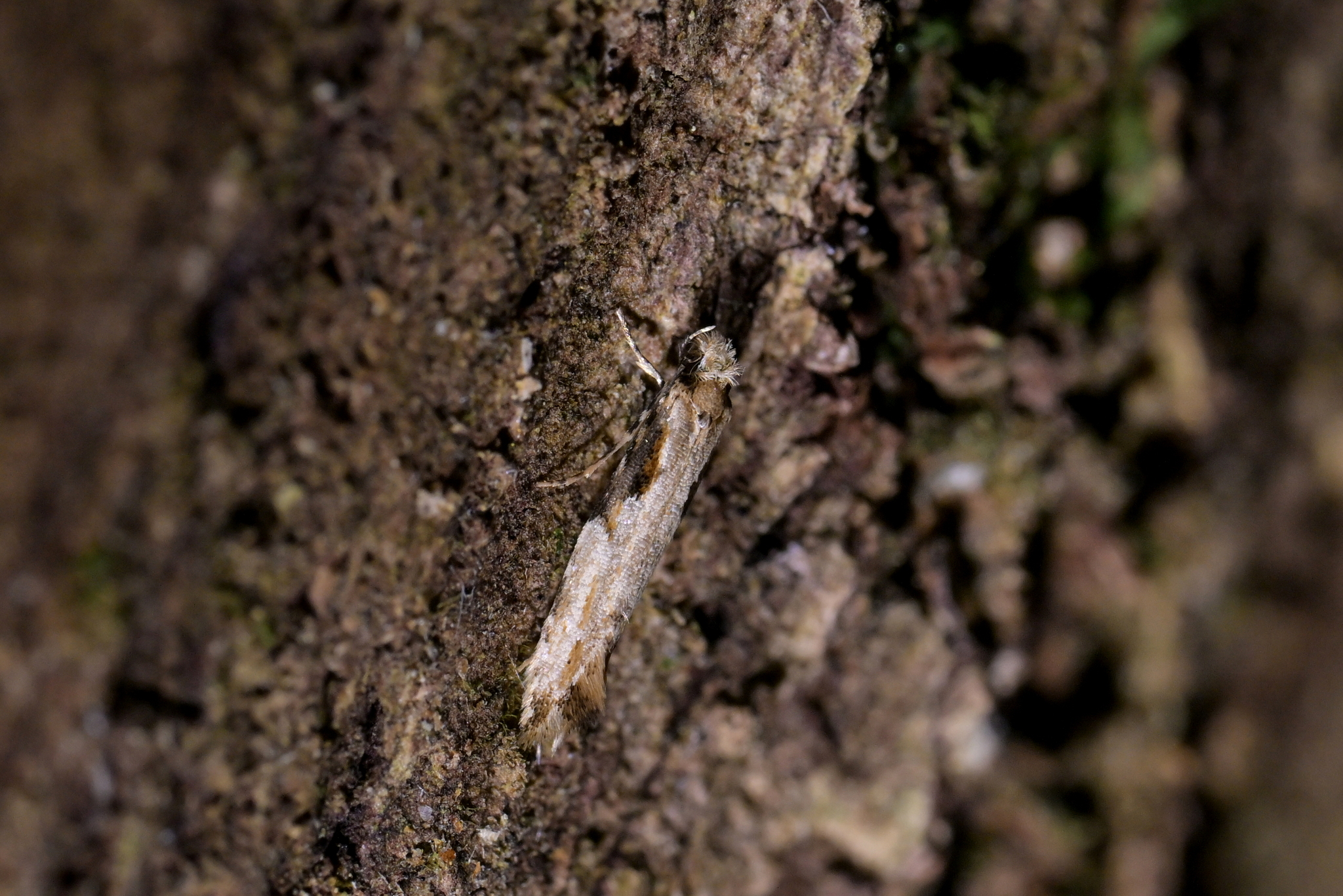
C. pharotoma on a tree trunk.

Adults are on the wing from September until March. Adult moths are attracted to light and can be observed resting on tree trunks.
