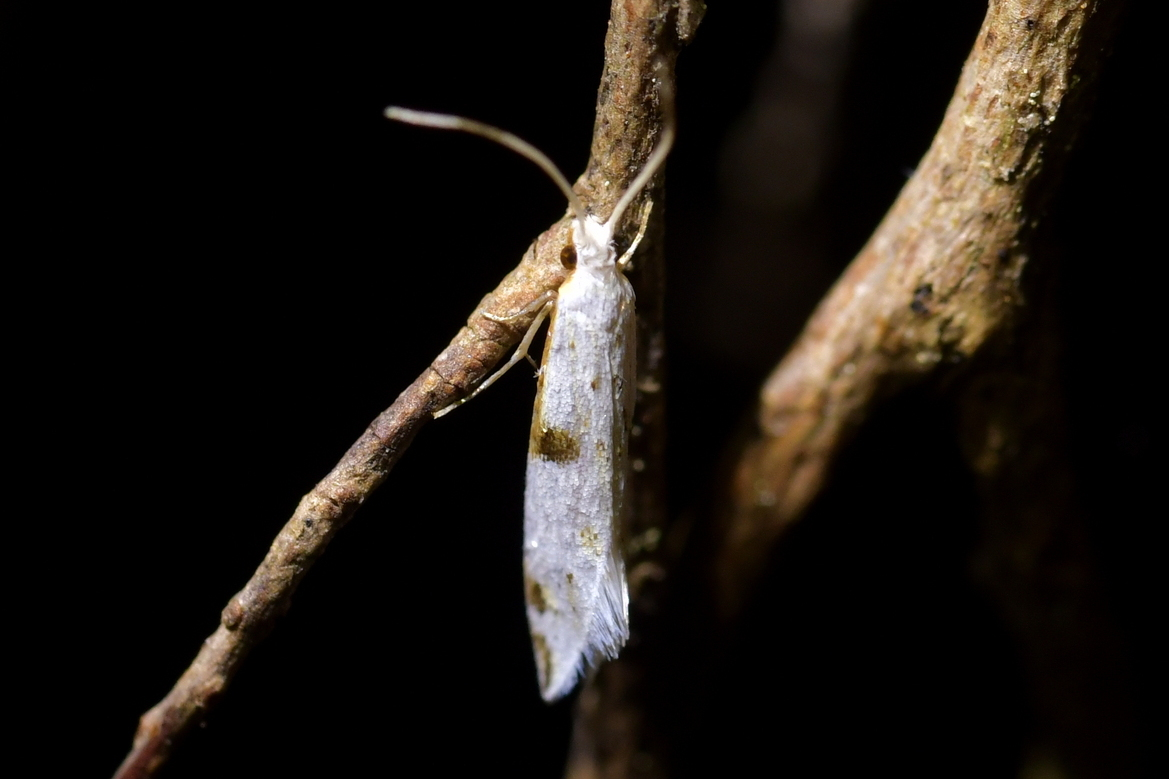

Scientific classification
- Kingdom: Animalia
- Phylum: Arthropoda
- Class: Insecta
- Order: Lepidoptera
- Family: Tineidae
- Genus: Sagephora
- Species: S. felix

Binomial name
- Sagephora felix Meyrick, 1914

= Sagephora felix =

Species of moth endemic to New Zealand

Sagephora felix is a species of moth in the family Tineidae. It was described by Edward Meyrick in 1914. This species is endemic to New Zealand and can be found in the north half of the North Island. It inhabits native forest and adults of the species are on the wing from December to May, in July and November.

== Taxonomy ==
This species was first described by Edward Meyrick in 1914, using a specimen collected by George Hudson at Kaeo in January, and named Sagephora felix. In 1928 George Hudson discussed and illustrated this species using that name. The male holotype specimen is held in the Natural History Museum, London.

== Description ==
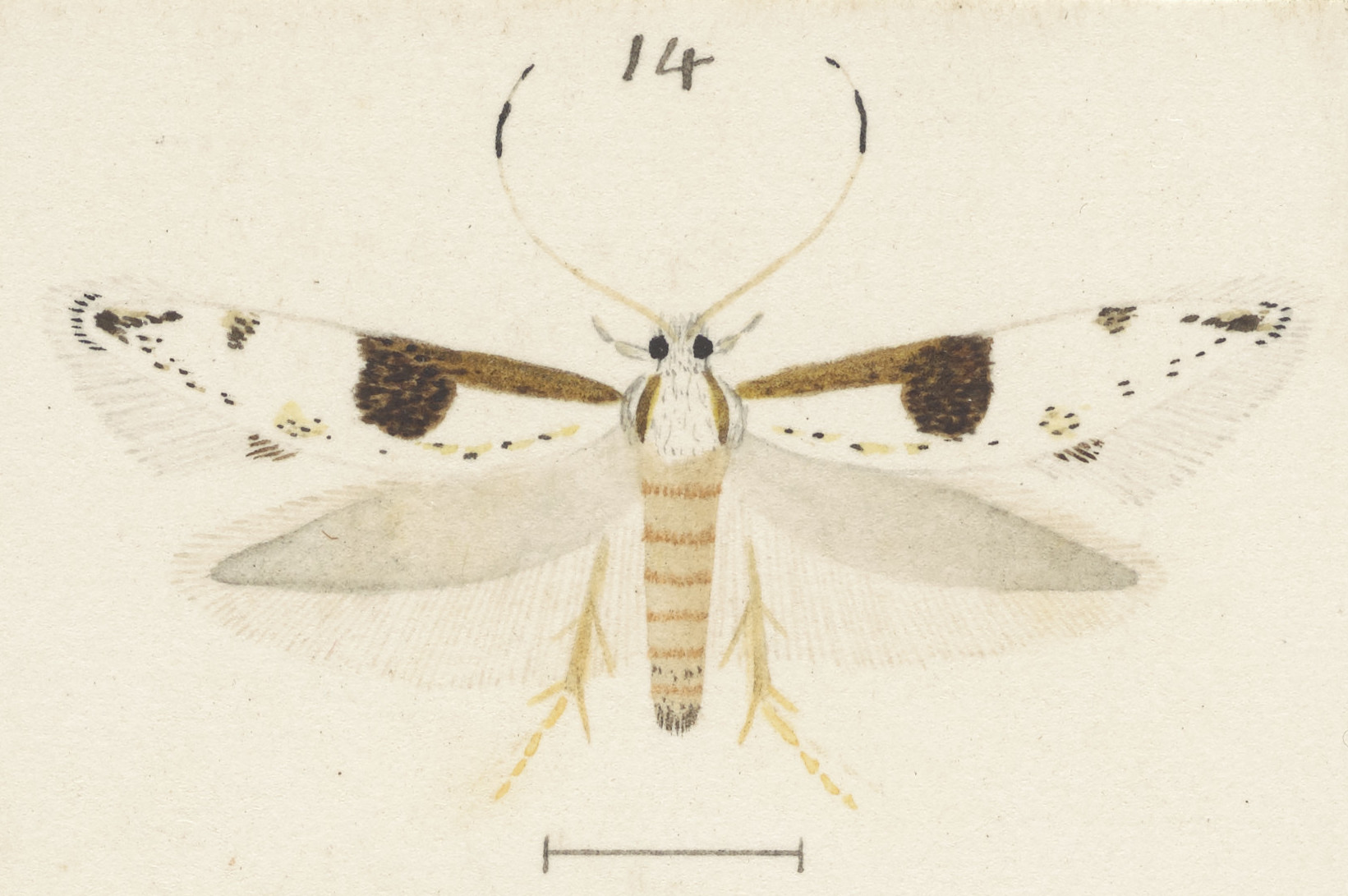
Illustration by George Hudson c. 1927

This species was described by Meyrick as follows:

♂. 10 mm. Head and thorax white. Palpi white, second joint dark fuscous except apex. Antennae white, with a blackish band at 2/3, and tip dark fuscous. (Abdomen broken.) Forewings elongate, rather narrow, costa gently arched, apex tolerably pointed, termen very obliquely rounded; shining snow-white; a dark-fuscous streak along costa from base to 2/5, edged below with ochreous-brown; a transverse dark-fuscous spot in disc at 2/5, touching extremity of costal streak; an irregular line of scattered dark-fuscous specks surrounded with some faint pale-yellowish suffusion running from fold before this spot near dorsum, and thence as a subterminal line to a fuscous spot on costa at 4/5; a rather dark fuscous spot along apical portion of costa : cilia white, on costa barred with fuscous. Hindwings pale whitish-grey; cilia ochreous-whitish.

== Distribution ==
This species is endemic to New Zealand. This species has been collected at its type locality Kaeo, as well as at Auckland and Wellington.

== Habitat ==
This species inhabits native forest.

== Behaviour ==
The adults of this species are on the wing December to May, July and November.
