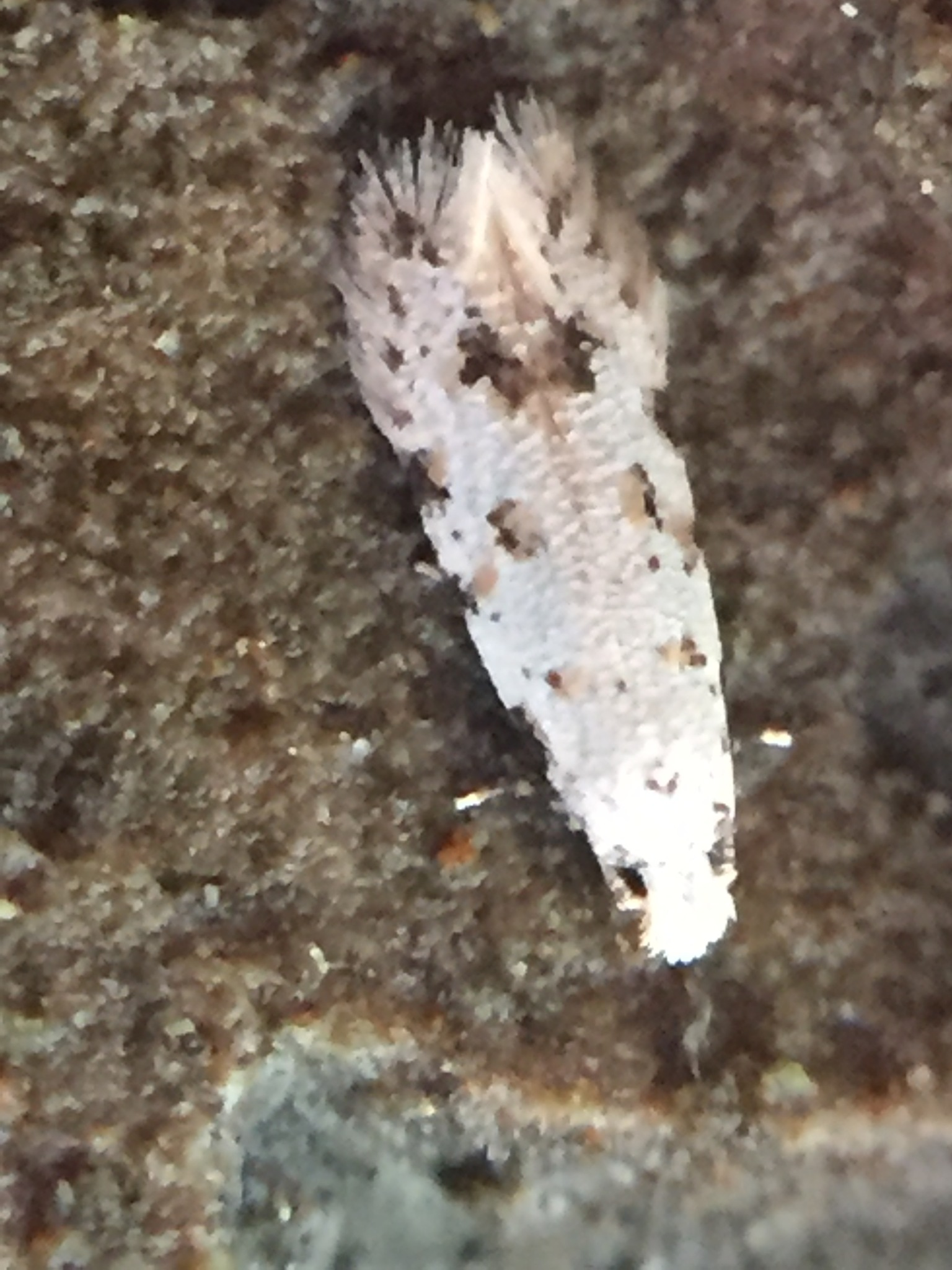

Scientific classification
- Kingdom: Animalia
- Phylum: Arthropoda
- Clade: Pancrustacea
- Class: Insecta
- Order: Lepidoptera
- Family: Tineidae
- Genus: Crypsitricha
- Species: C. stereota

Binomial name
- Crypsitricha stereota (Meyrick, 1914)

Synonyms
- Endophthora stereota Meyrick, 1914

= Crypsitricha stereota =

Species of moth endemic to New Zealand

Crypsitricha stereota is a species of moth in the family Tineidae. It was first described by Edward Meyrick in 1914. This species is endemic to New Zealand and has been observed in the North and South Islands. It inhabits native forest and adults are on the wing from December until March. Adults can be seen resting on tree trunks.

== Taxonomy ==
This species was first described by Edward Meyrick in 1914 and originally named it Endophthora stereota. Meyrick placed this species in the genus Crypsitricha in 1915. George Hudson discussed and illustrated this species under the name Crypsitricha stereota in his 1924 book The butterflies and moths of New Zealand. Alfred Philpott studied the male genitalia of this species in 1927. The male lectotype, collected in Auckland by Hudson, is held at the Natural History Museum, London.

== Description ==
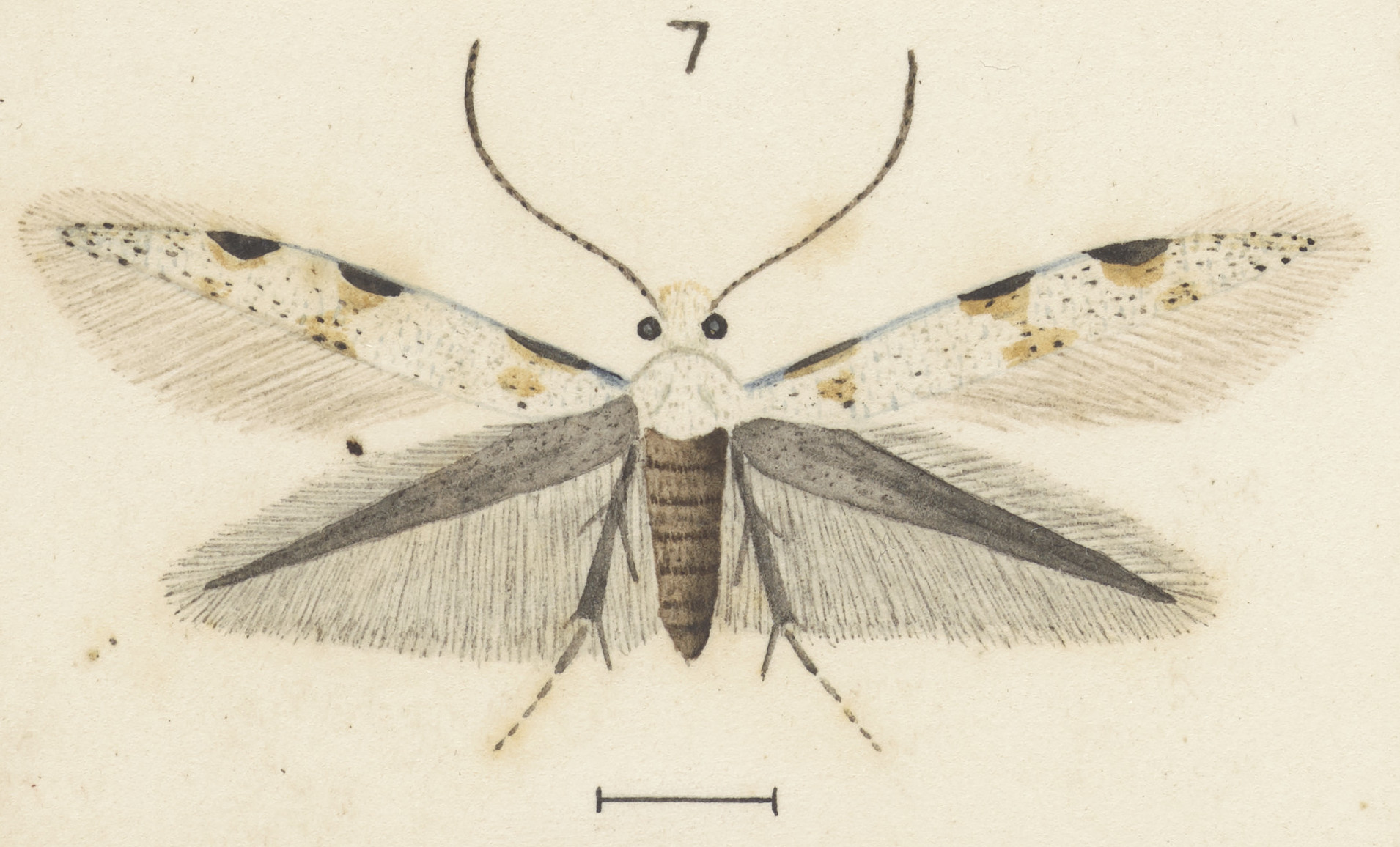
Illustration of C. stereota by George Hudson.

The wingspan is 7–8 mm. The forewings are ochreous-whitish, irrorated with pale grey, with some scattered black scales, as well as three black spots on the costa, margined beneath with brownish-ochreous, the first at one-fourth, connected with the base by a costal line of black irroration, others before the middle and at two-thirds. There is a small light brownish-ochreous spot beneath the middle of the disc, connected with the dorsum by a group of black scales. There is also a group of black scales on the tornus, and a small pale-ochreous spot near the termen beyond it. The hindwings are grey with cilia coloured ochreous-gray-whitish.

This species is the smallest in the genus.

== Distribution ==
This species is endemic to New Zealand and has been observed in the North and South Islands.

== Habitat ==
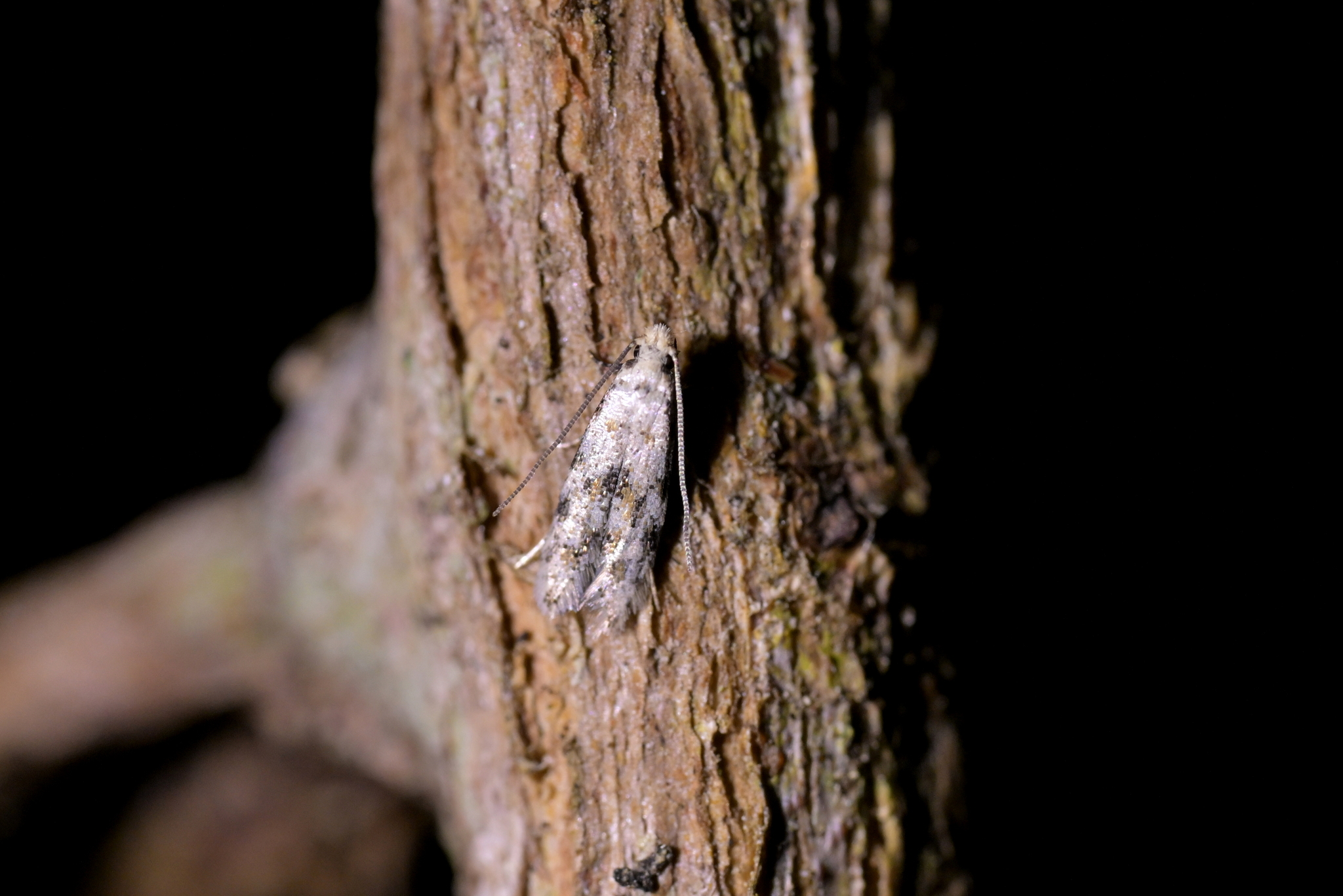
C. stereota resting on tree trunk.

This species inhabits native forest.

== Behaviour ==
Adults are on the wing from December until March and have been seen resting on tree trunks.
