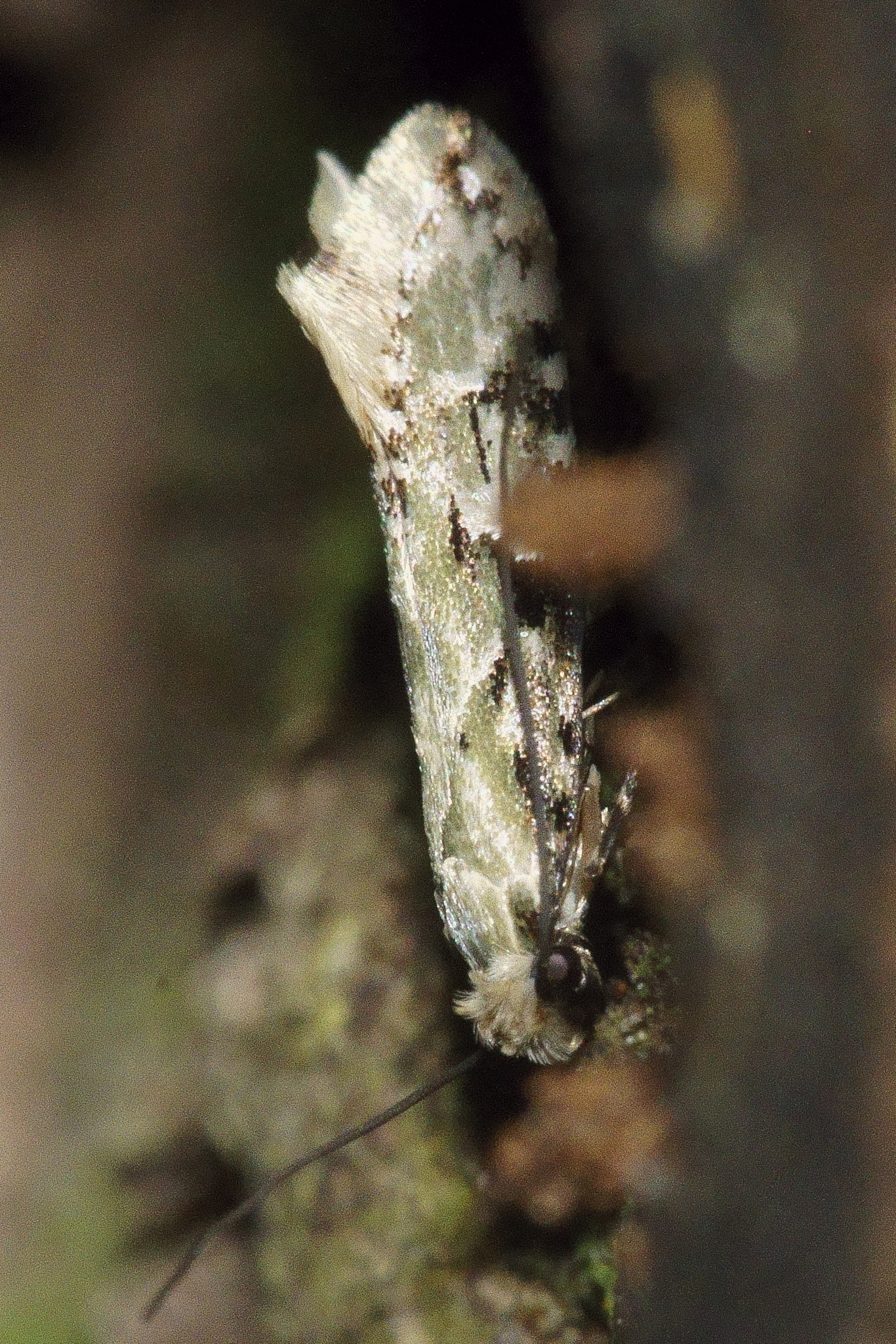
- Type species C. mesotypa

Scientific classification
- Kingdom: Animalia
- Phylum: Arthropoda
- Clade: Pancrustacea
- Class: Insecta
- Order: Lepidoptera
- Family: Tineidae
- Genus: Crypsitricha; Meyrick, 1915

= Crypsitricha =

Genus of moths

Crypsitricha is a genus of moths belonging to the family Tineidae. It was first described by Edward Meyrick in 1915 with the type species being Endophthora mesotypa by original designation. Species in this genus are found in New Zealand and New Guinea.

== Taxonomy ==
This genus was first described by Edward Meyrick in 1915. The type species is Endophthora mesotypa by original designation. Alfred Philpott studied the male genitalia of species in this genus in 1927.

== Description ==
Meyrick originally described this genus as follows:

Head rough. Basal joint of antennae rather dilated, with pecten. Labial palpi rather long, subascending, second joint with appressed scales, terminal joint shorter than second, slender. Maxillary palpi long, folded. Forewings with all veins present ; on lower surface with fringe of short hairs on vein 1b in disc. Hindwings lanceolate.

== Distribution ==
Species in this genus are found in New Zealand and New Guinea.

== Species ==
- Crypsitricha agriopa (Meyrick, 1888) - New Zealand
- Crypsitricha generosa Philpott, 1926 - New Zealand
- Crypsitricha mesotypa (Meyrick, 1888) - New Zealand
- Crypsitricha oeceotypa Diakonoff, 1955 - New Guinea
- Crypsitricha pharotoma (Meyrick, 1888) - New Zealand
- Crypsitricha roseata (Meyrick, 1913) - New Zealand
- Crypsitricha stereota (Meyrick, 1914) - New Zealand
