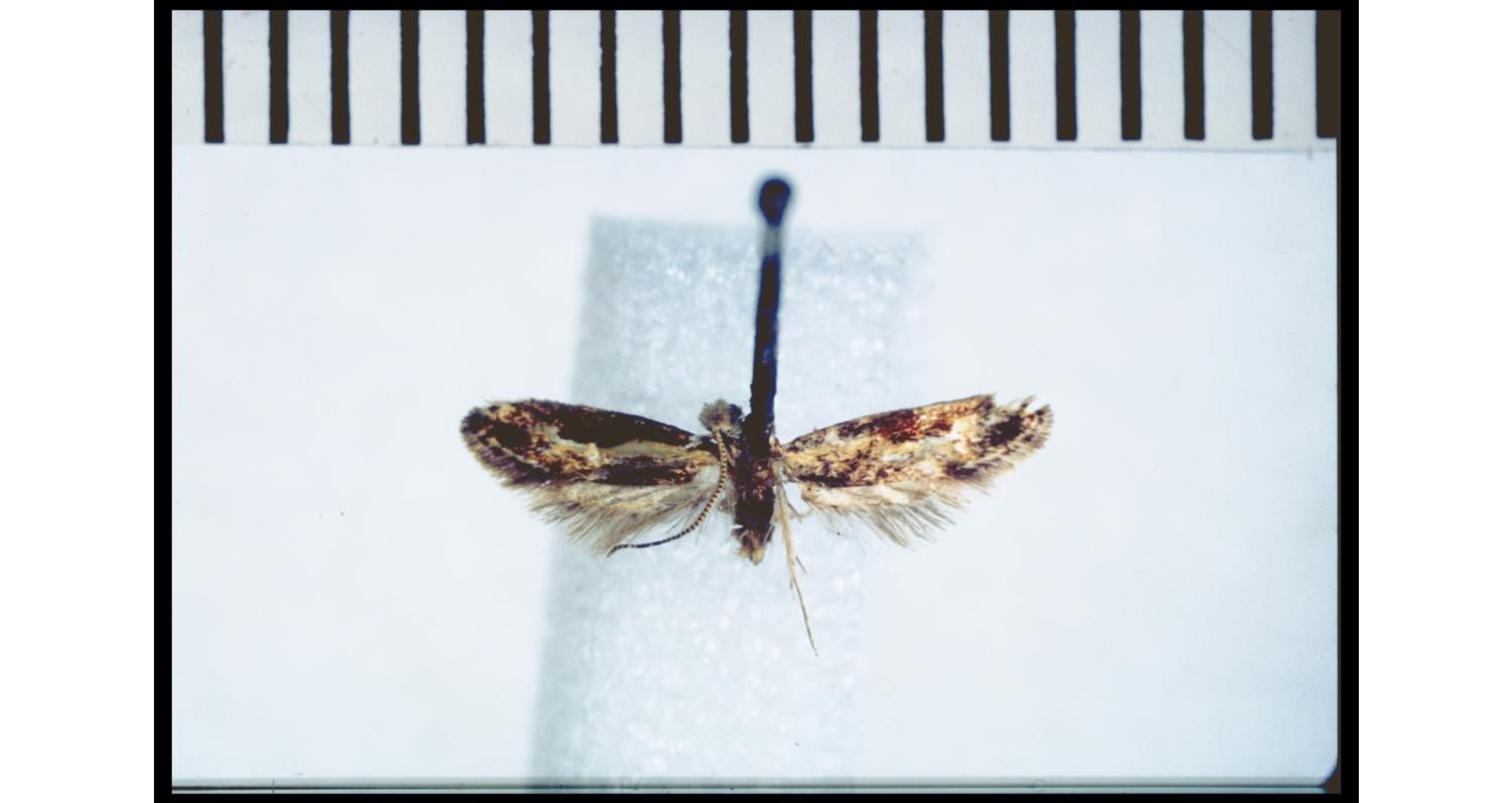
- Male holotype

Scientific classification
- Kingdom: Animalia
- Phylum: Arthropoda
- Class: Insecta
- Order: Lepidoptera
- Family: Tineidae
- Genus: Sagephora
- Species: S. jocularis

Binomial name
- Sagephora jocularis Philpott, 1926

= Sagephora jocularis =

Species of moth

Sagephora jocularis is a species of moth in the family Tineidae. It was described by Alfred Philpott in 1926. This species is endemic to New Zealand and has been collected in Canterbury and Southland. Adults are on the wing in January and October.

== Taxonomy ==
This species was first described by Alfred Philpott using a specimen collected at Tisbury in Southland and named Sagephora jocularis. In 1928 George Hudson discussed and illustrated this species. The male holotype specimen is held in the New Zealand Arthropod Collection.

== Description ==
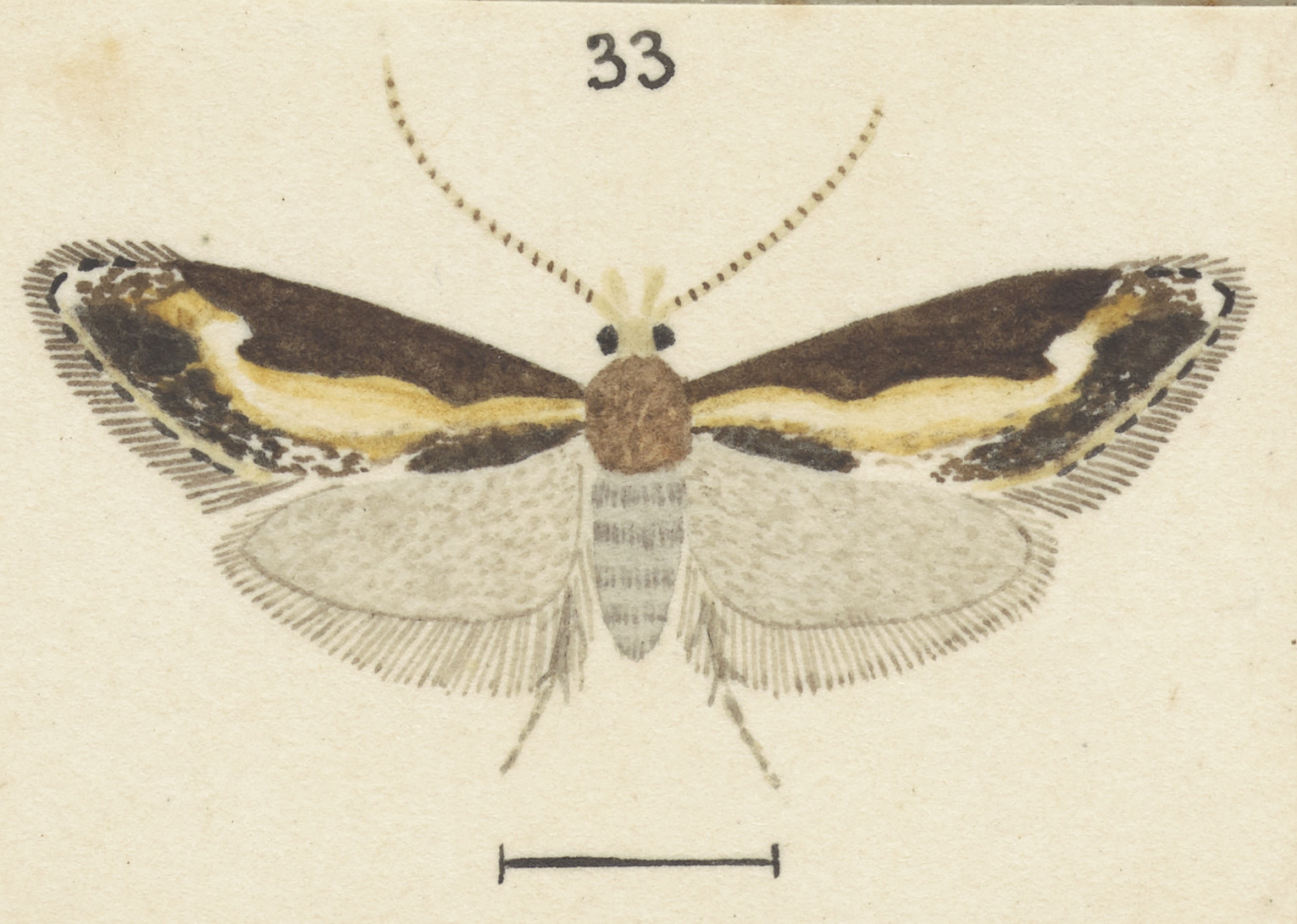
Illustration of S. jocularis by George Hudson.

Philpott described this species as follows:

♂. 9 mm. Head white tinged with brown. Palpi fuscous, apex of second segment and terminal segment white. Antennae ochreous, annulated with fuscous. Thorax fuscous, a lateral stripe and tegulae whitish-ochreous. Abdomen fuscous. Legs greyish-fuscous. Forewings elongate, costa moderately arched, apex rounded, termen very oblique; ochreous mixed with white; a broad, fuscous-brown stripe along costa from base to 4/5, strongly dilated on its apical half where it is margined beneath with white; a fuscous-brown stripe on dorsum from base to 1/2 beyond this to tornus the fuscous is mixed with ochreous-white; apical fourth chiefly fuscous-brown but with some mixture of ochreous and white; a thin ochreous and white line along termen: fringes greyish-fuscous with interrupted black basal line. Hindwings and fringes greyish-fuscous.

== Distribution ==
This species is endemic to New Zealand. Specimens have been collected at the type locality of Tisbury, as well as Purau and Dyer's Pass in Canterbury.

== Behaviour ==
This species is on the wing in January and October.
