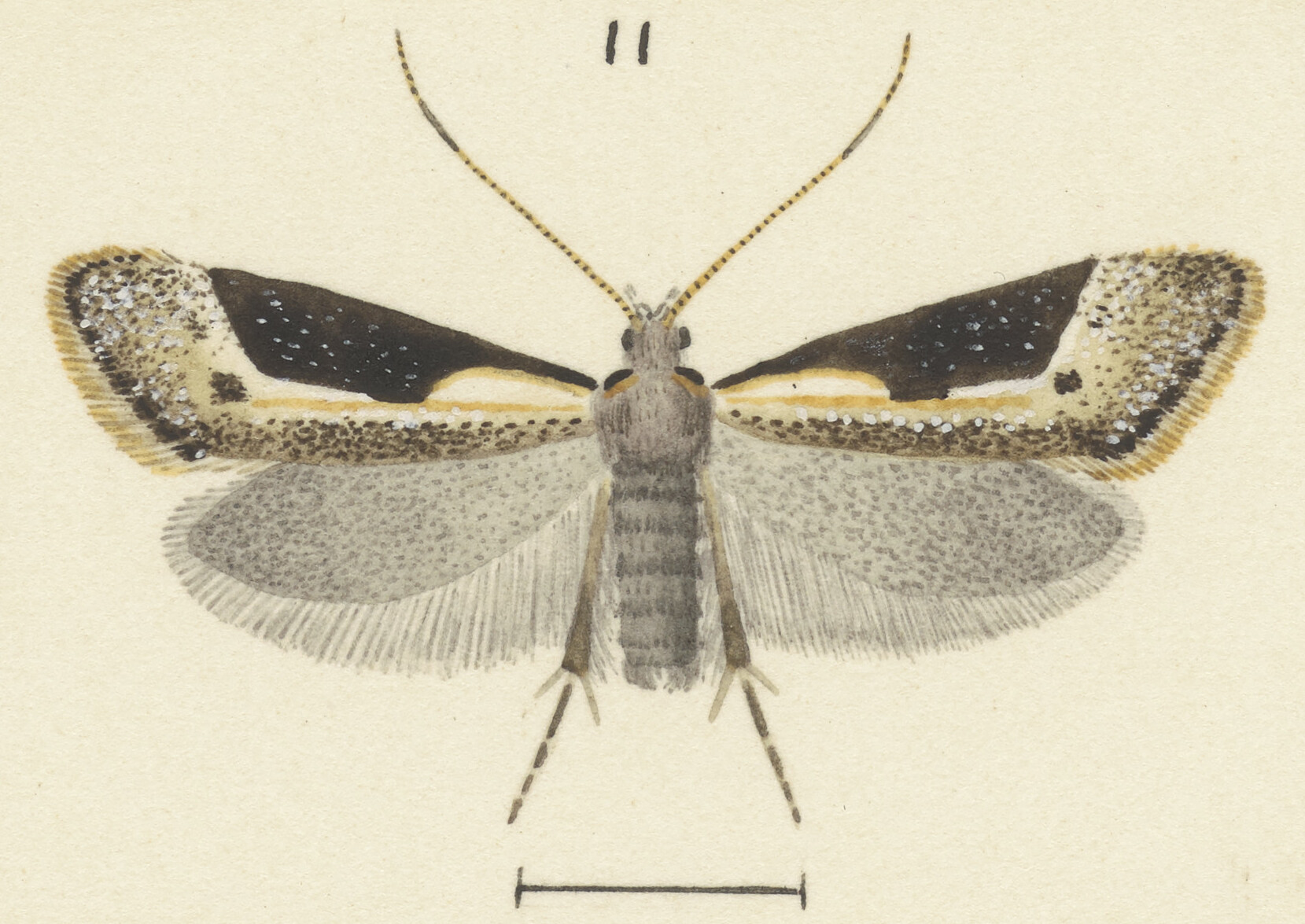

Scientific classification
- Kingdom: Animalia
- Phylum: Arthropoda
- Class: Insecta
- Order: Lepidoptera
- Family: Tineidae
- Genus: Sagephora
- Species: S. subcarinata

Binomial name
- Sagephora subcarinata Meyick, 1931

= Sagephora subcarinata =

Species of moth

Sagephora subcarinata is a species of moth in the family Tineidae. It was described by Edward Meyrick in 1931. This species is endemic to New Zealand.
