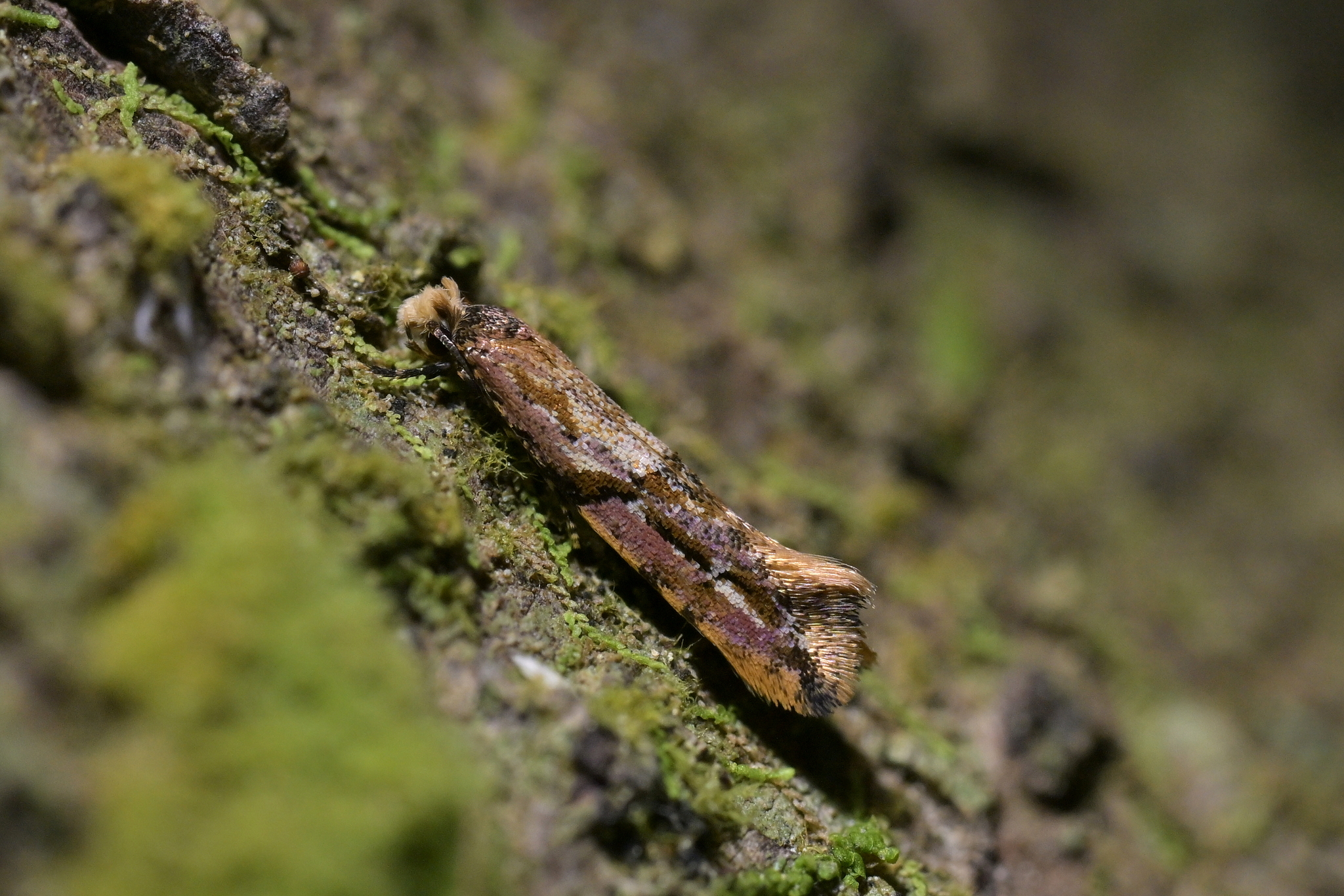

Scientific classification
- Kingdom: Animalia
- Phylum: Arthropoda
- Clade: Pancrustacea
- Class: Insecta
- Order: Lepidoptera
- Family: Tineidae
- Genus: Crypsitricha
- Species: C. roseata

Binomial name
- Crypsitricha roseata (Meyrick, 1913)

Synonyms
- Endophthora roseata Meyrick, 1913

= Crypsitricha roseata =

Species of moth endemic to New Zealand

Crypsitricha roseata is a species of moth in the family Tineidae. It was first described by Edward Meyrick in 1913. This species is endemic to New Zealand and has been observed in both the North and South Islands. The type locality of this species is the suburb of Wadestown, in Wellington. This species inhabits native forest and dense forest ravines. Adults are on the wing from November until February. At rest the adults can resemble minute sticks.

== Taxonomy ==
This species was first described by Edward Meyrick in 1913 and originally named Endophthora roseata. Meyrick placed this species in the genus Crypsitricha in 1915. George Hudson discussed and illustrated this species under the name Crypsitricha stereota in his 1924 book The butterflies and moths of New Zealand. Alfred Philpott studied the male genitalia of this species in 1927. The female holotype, collecting in the Wellington suburb of Wadestown by Hudson, is held at the Natural History Museum, London.

== Description ==
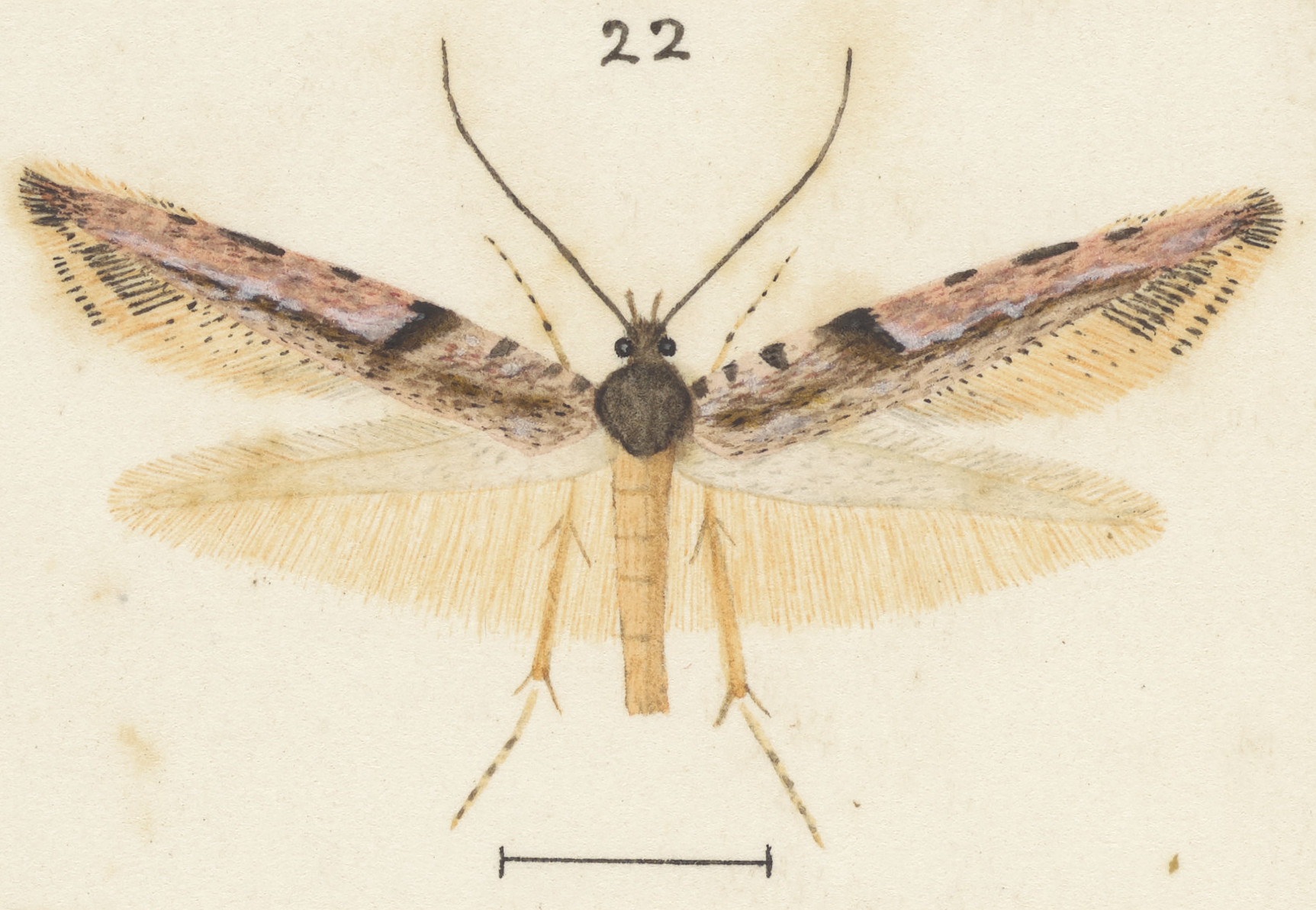
Illustration of male.

The adult wingspan is about 12 mm. The forewings are light rosy-purple-brownish with about eight small blackish costal marks and an irregular brown mark on the fold towards the base, terminated by a few blackish scales, and edged with some whitish suffusion. There is a narrow oblique brown fascia from before the middle of the costa to beyond the middle of the dorsum, partially edged with blackish posteriorly. A streak of brown suffusion runs from the middle of the disc to the middle of the termen, including a line of black scales, and edged above posteriorly by a fine white streak. The hindwings are grey.

== Distribution ==
This species is endemic to New Zealand and has been observed in both the North and South Islands.

== Habitat ==
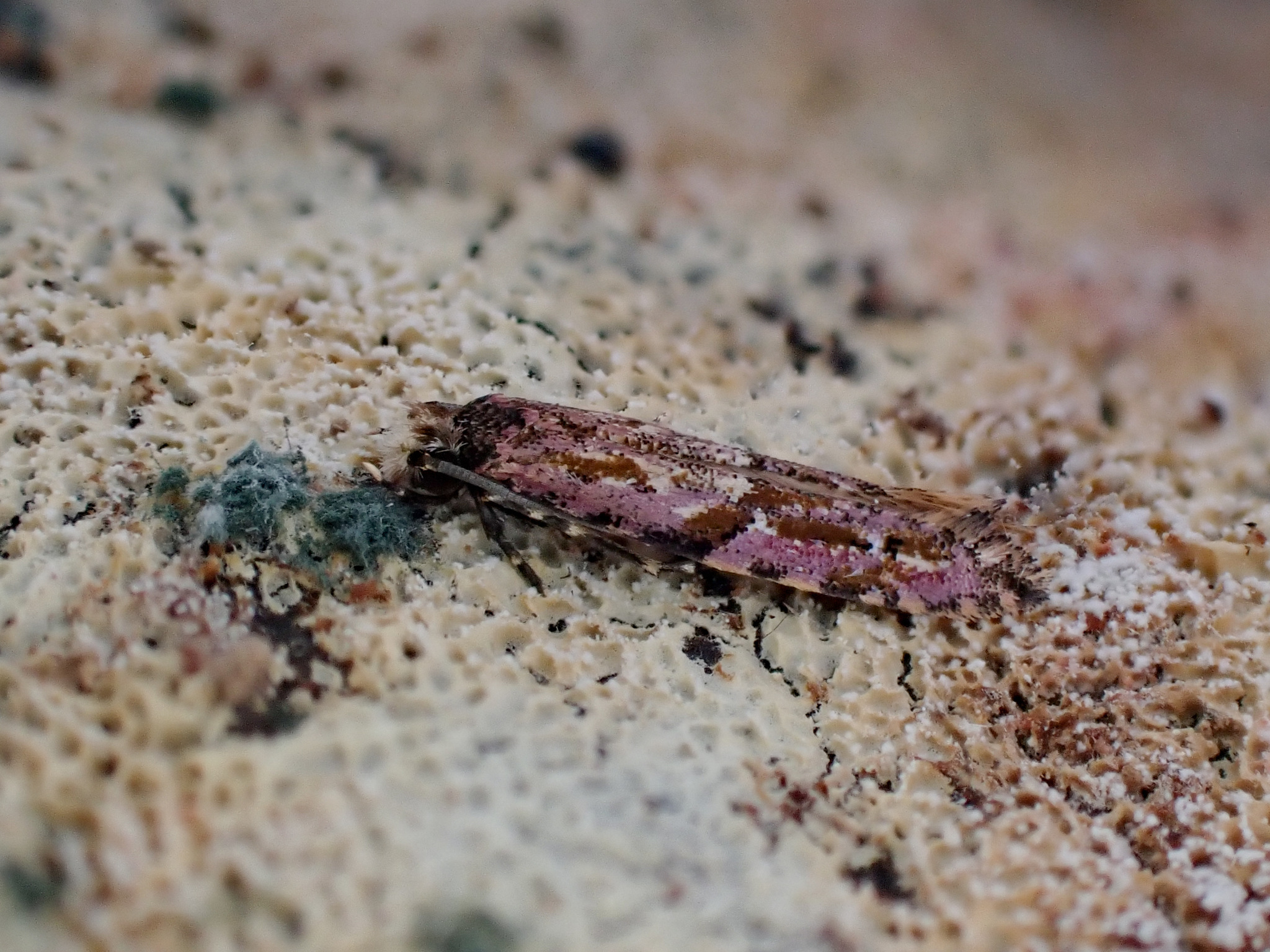
Close up of C. roseata.

C. roseata inhabits native forest and dense forest ravines.

== Behaviour ==
Adults of this species are on the wing from September until March. They are attracted to light. Adults rest with their wings close to their body and forming a steep peak with their antennae held backwards under their wings and their foreleg feet are placed forwards. This position helps the moth resemble a tiny stick.
