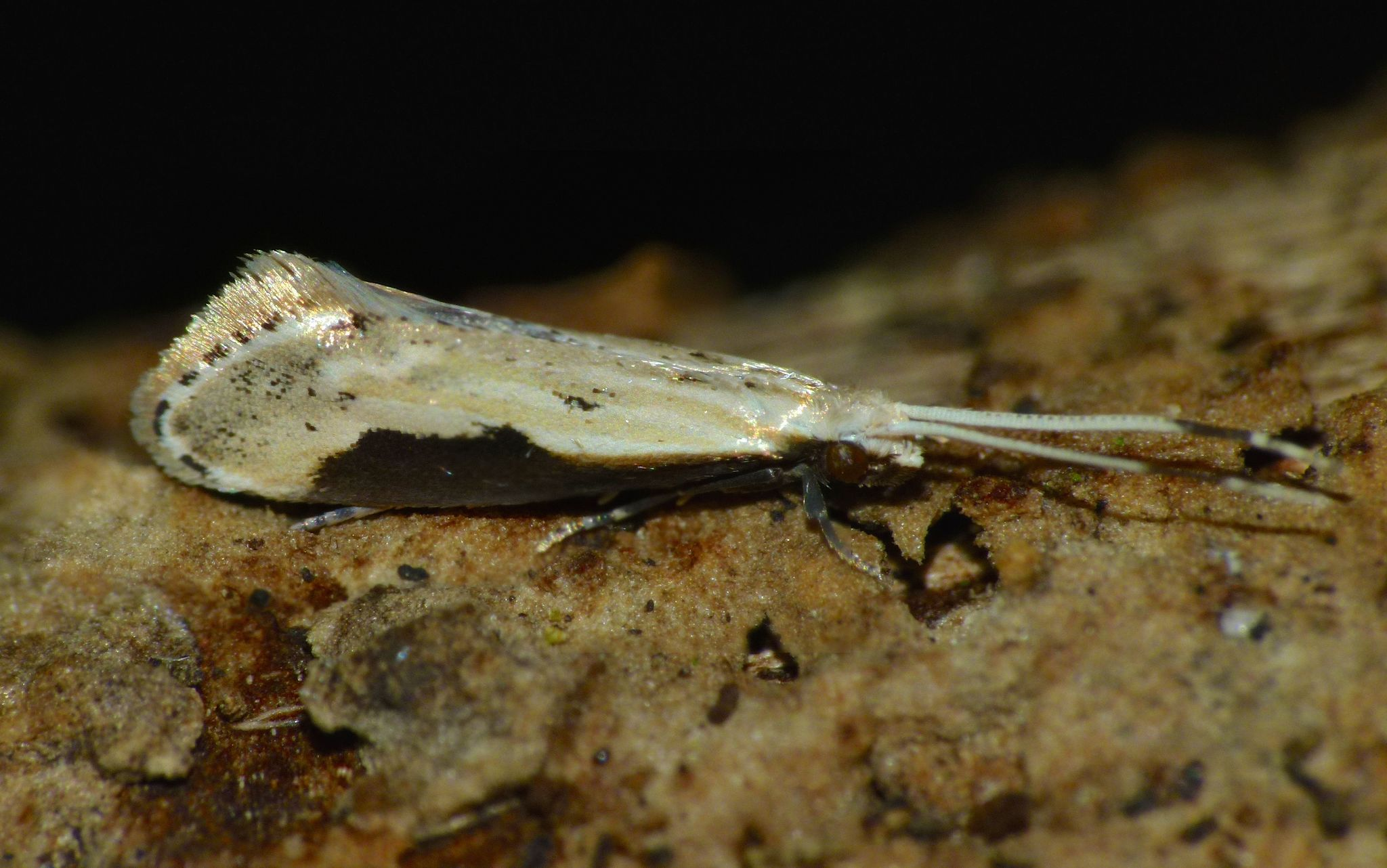
- Sagephora phortegella

Scientific classification
- Kingdom: Animalia
- Phylum: Arthropoda
- Clade: Pancrustacea
- Class: Insecta
- Order: Lepidoptera
- Family: Tineidae
- Genus: Sagephora; Meyrick, 1888

= Sagephora =

Genus of moths

Sagephora is a genus of moths belonging to the family Tineidae.

== Species ==
- Sagephora exsanguis Philpott, 1918
- Sagephora felix Meyrick, 1914
- Sagephora jocularis Philpott, 1926
- Sagephora phortegella Meyrick, 1888
- Sagephora steropastis Meyrick, 1891
- Sagephora subcarinata Meyrick, 1931
