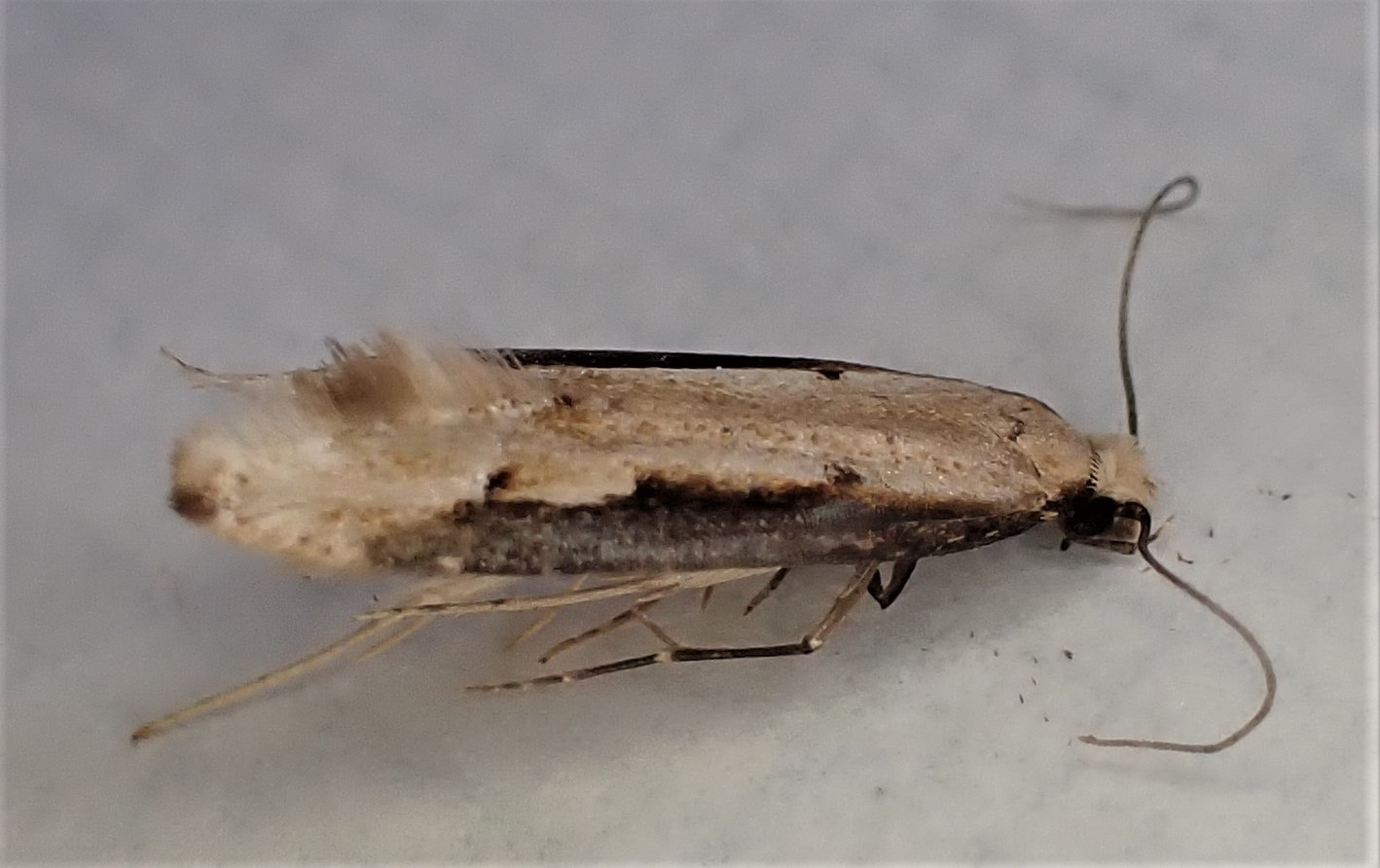

Scientific classification
- Kingdom: Animalia
- Phylum: Arthropoda
- Class: Insecta
- Order: Lepidoptera
- Family: Tineidae
- Genus: Crypsitricha
- Species: C. generosa

Binomial name
- Crypsitricha generosa Philpott, 1926

= Crypsitricha generosa =

Species of moth

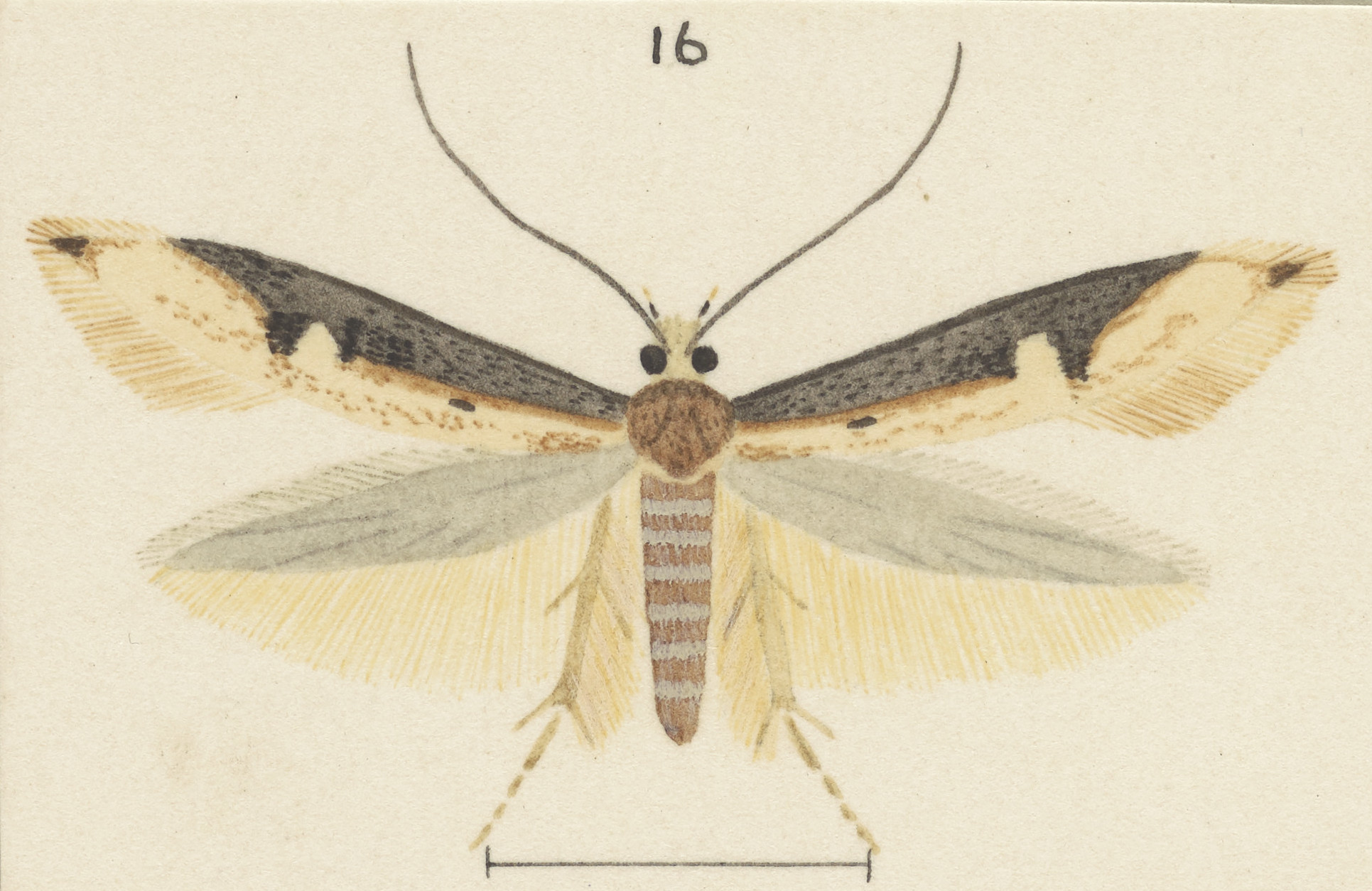
Watercolour by George Hudson c. 1927

Crypsitricha generosa is a species of moth in the family Tineidae. It was described by Alfred Philpott in 1926. This species is endemic to New Zealand.
