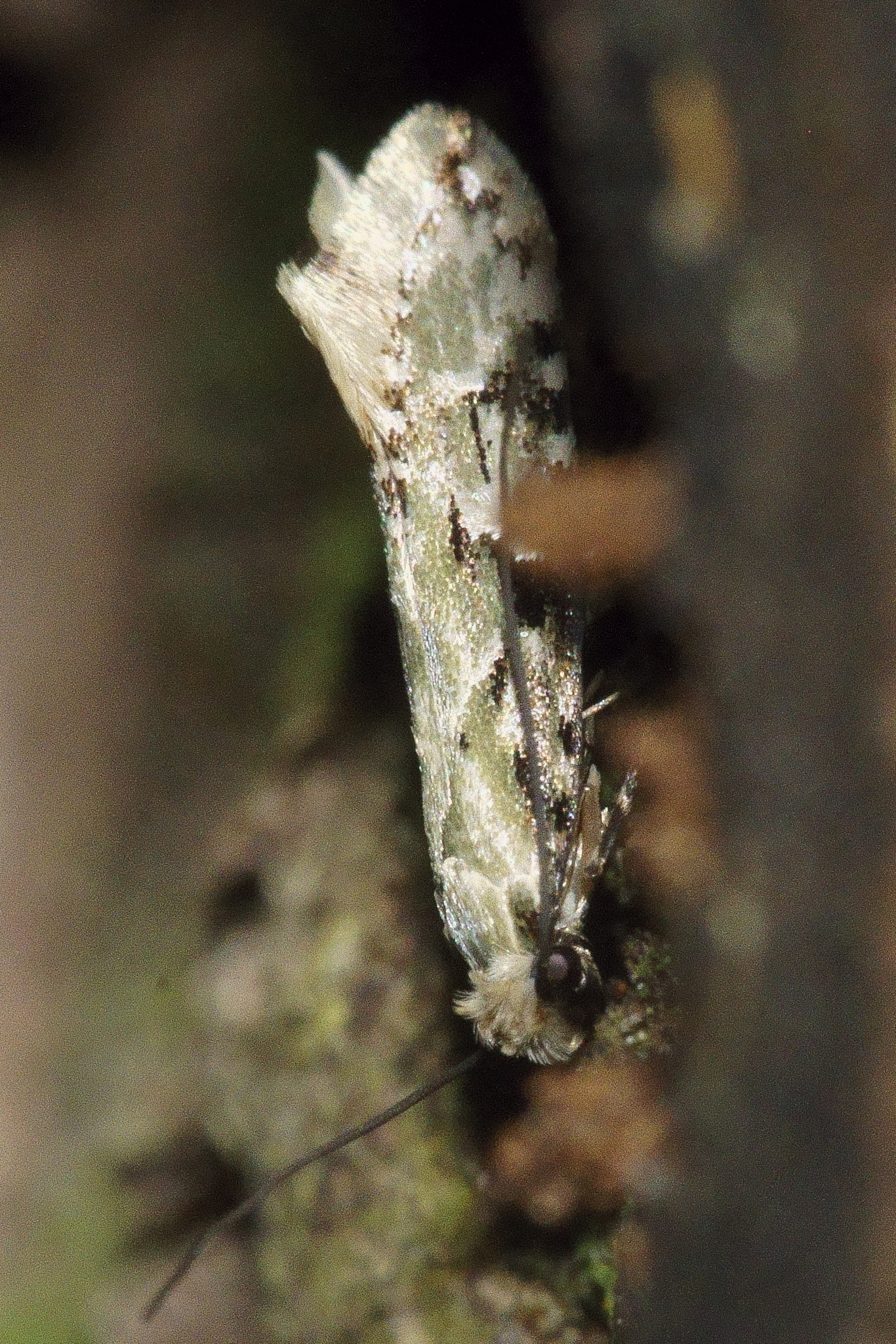

Scientific classification
- Kingdom: Animalia
- Phylum: Arthropoda
- Clade: Pancrustacea
- Class: Insecta
- Order: Lepidoptera
- Family: Tineidae
- Genus: Crypsitricha
- Species: C. mesotypa

Binomial name
- Crypsitricha mesotypa (Meyrick, 1888)

Synonyms
- Endophthora mesotypa Meyrick, 1888

= Crypsitricha mesotypa =

Species of moth endemic to New Zealand

Crypsitricha mesotypa is a species of moth in the family Tineidae. It was first described by Edward Meyrick in 1888. This species is endemic to New Zealand and is found throughout the North and South Islands. This species inhabits native forest. It passes winter as a pupa and adults are on the wing commonly from December until March. Adults can be observed resting on moss covered tree trunks. If disturbed the adult moth drops to the ground and runs to hide in the nearest crevice.

== Taxonomy ==
This species was first described by Edward Meyrick in 1888 and originally named Endophthora mesotypa. Meyrick placed this species in the genus Crypsitricha in 1915. George Hudson discussed and illustrated this species under the name Crypsitricha mesotypa in his 1924 book The butterflies and moths of New Zealand. Alfred Philpott studied the male genitalia of this species in 1927. The female lectotype, collected in Auckland by Meyrick, is held at the Natural History Museum, London.

Hudson pointed out that specimens of this species can vary considerably in the extent and intensity of dark markings on their wings and that some forms have more green colouration ensuring the moth is well camouflaged against moss.

== Description ==
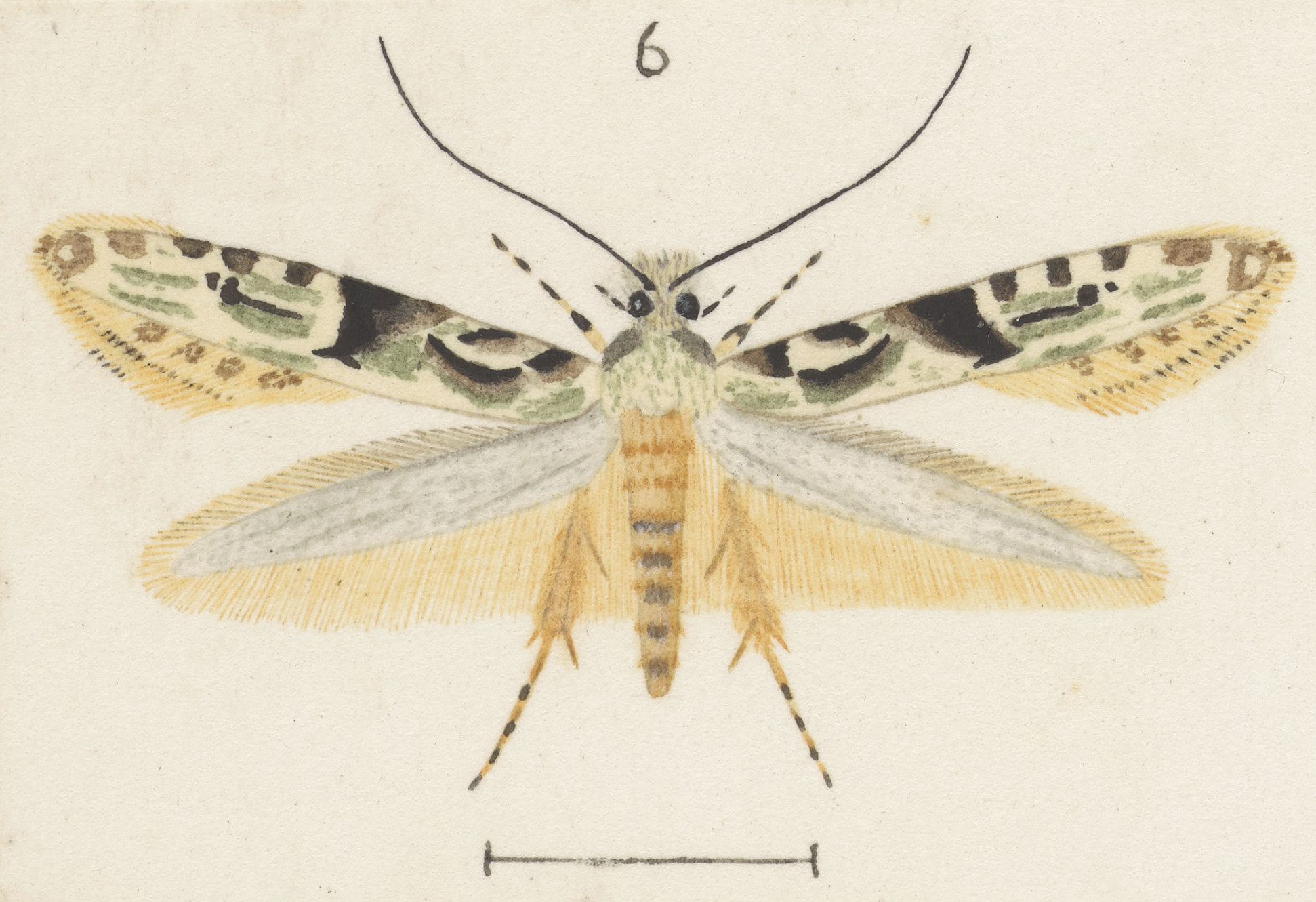
Illustration by Hudson.

The wingspan is 10–14 mm. The forewings are light brownish-ochreous, irregularly suffused with ochreous-whitish. There are two small black spots on the costa towards the base and a blackish longitudinal mark in the disc near the base, as well as a straight rather oblique thick blackish bar from the costa at two-fifths, reaching more than half across the wing, followed by an ochreous-whitish bar. The space between these blackish markings is suffused with fuscous. The posterior half of the costa is blackish-fuscous spotted with ochreous-whitish and there is a small black spot in disc at two-thirds, more or less distinctly bisected by a projection from an ochreous-whitish spot beneath it. The hindwings are whitish-grey.

== Distribution ==
This species is endemic to New Zealand. It is found in the North and South Islands.

== Habitat and hosts ==
This species inhabits native forest.

== Behaviour and life history. ==
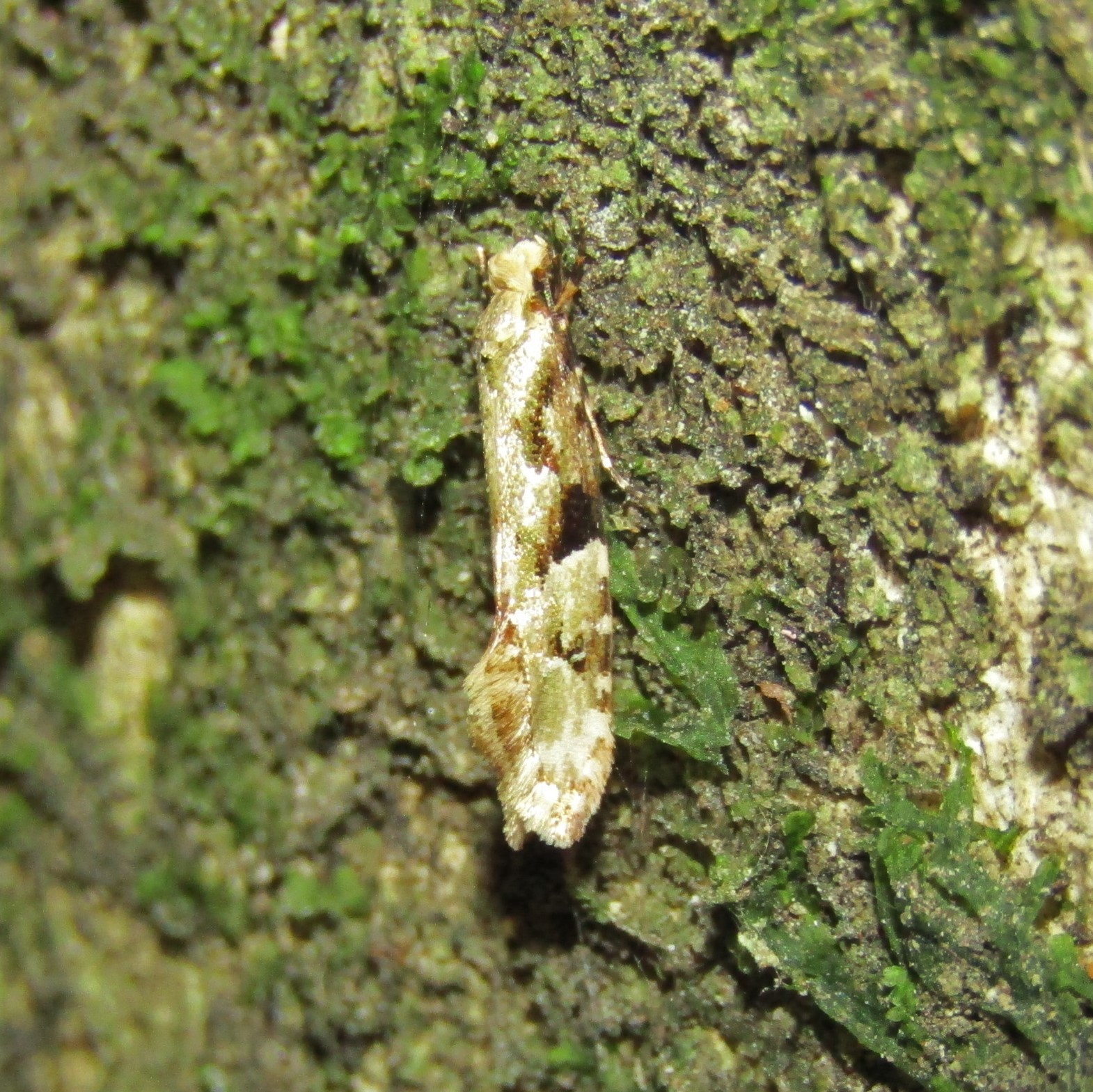
Living specimen of C. mesotypa on moss on tree trunk

This species passes the winter as a pupa. Adults are on the wing most commonly in December until March and are attracted to light. Adults have been observed resting on moss covered tree trunks with wings closed and forming a steep roof. The large black costa patch ensures the moth wing outline is broken up, which, along with the wing colouration, helps improve the cryptic appearance of the adult moth. When disturbed the adult moth drops to the ground, runs and attempts to hide itself in crevices.
