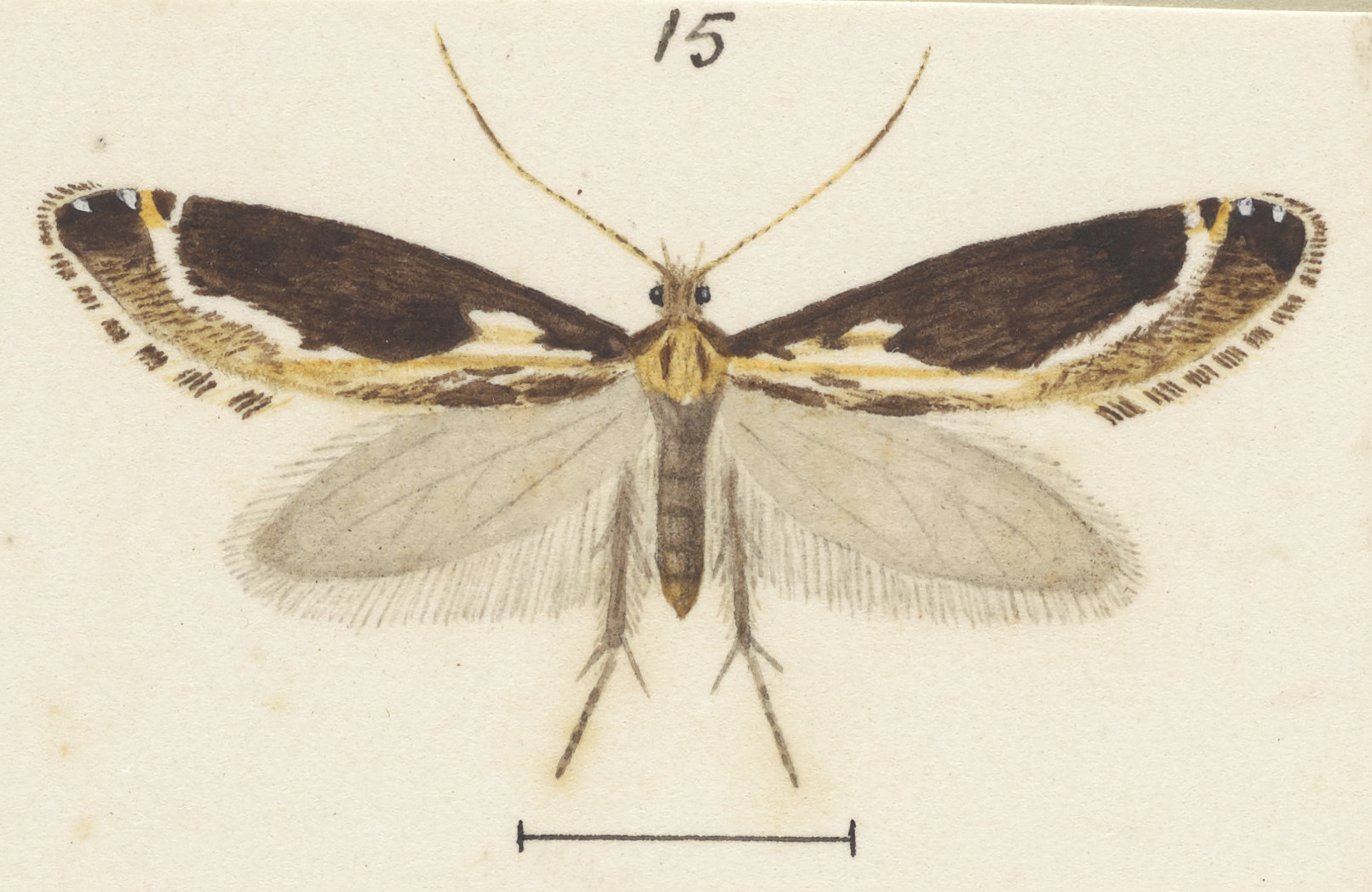

Scientific classification
- Kingdom: Animalia
- Phylum: Arthropoda
- Class: Insecta
- Order: Lepidoptera
- Family: Tineidae
- Genus: Sagephora
- Species: S. steropastis

Binomial name
- Sagephora steropastis Meyick, 1891

= Sagephora steropastis =

Species of moth

Sagephora steropastis is a species of moth in the family Tineidae. It was described by Edward Meyrick in 1891. This species is endemic to New Zealand.

The wingspan is about 11 mm. The forewings are blackish-fuscous with a very irregular pale ochreous streak from the base along the fold to one-third, then along the inner margin to near the anal angle. From the apex of this proceeds a zigzag ochreous-whitish line near the hindmargin to the costa at five-sixths. The hindwings are grey.
