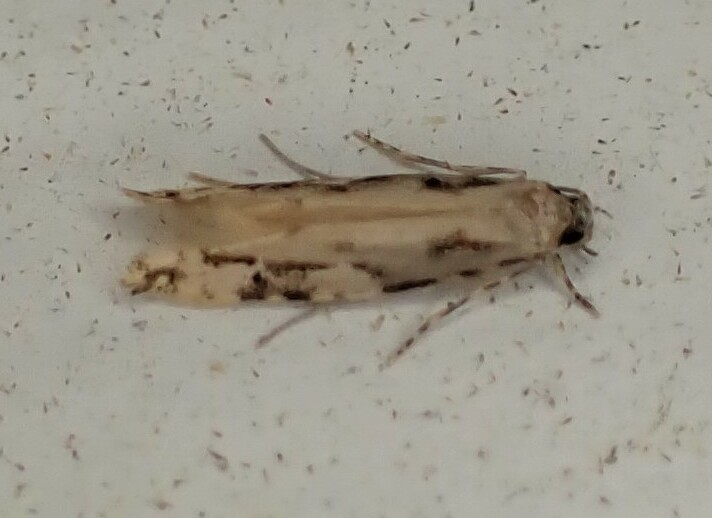

Scientific classification
- Kingdom: Animalia
- Phylum: Arthropoda
- Class: Insecta
- Order: Lepidoptera
- Family: Tineidae
- Genus: Crypsitricha
- Species: C. agriopa

Binomial name
- Crypsitricha agriopa (Meyrick, 1888)

Synonyms
- Endophthora agriopa Meyrick, 1888

= Crypsitricha agriopa =

Species of moth

Crypsitricha agriopa is a species of moth in the family Tineidae. It was described by Edward Meyrick in 1888. This species is endemic to New Zealand.

The wingspan is about 9 mm. The forewings are fuscous with a slender ferruginous streak along the submedian fold, suffusedly margined beneath with whitish-ochreous, and above by three cloudy blackish dots. There are two small black spots on the costa towards the base and there is a black wedge-shaped spot from the costa before the middle, reaching half across wing, followed by an ochreous-white similar spot. The posterior half of the costa narrowly is black, with five small clear ochreous-white spots and there a short longitudinal ferruginous streak in the disc beyond the middle, as well as an irregular, small, white spot in the disc at three-fourths, partially margined above with black. The apex and hindmargin are suffusedly irrorated with blackish. The hindwings are dark grey.
