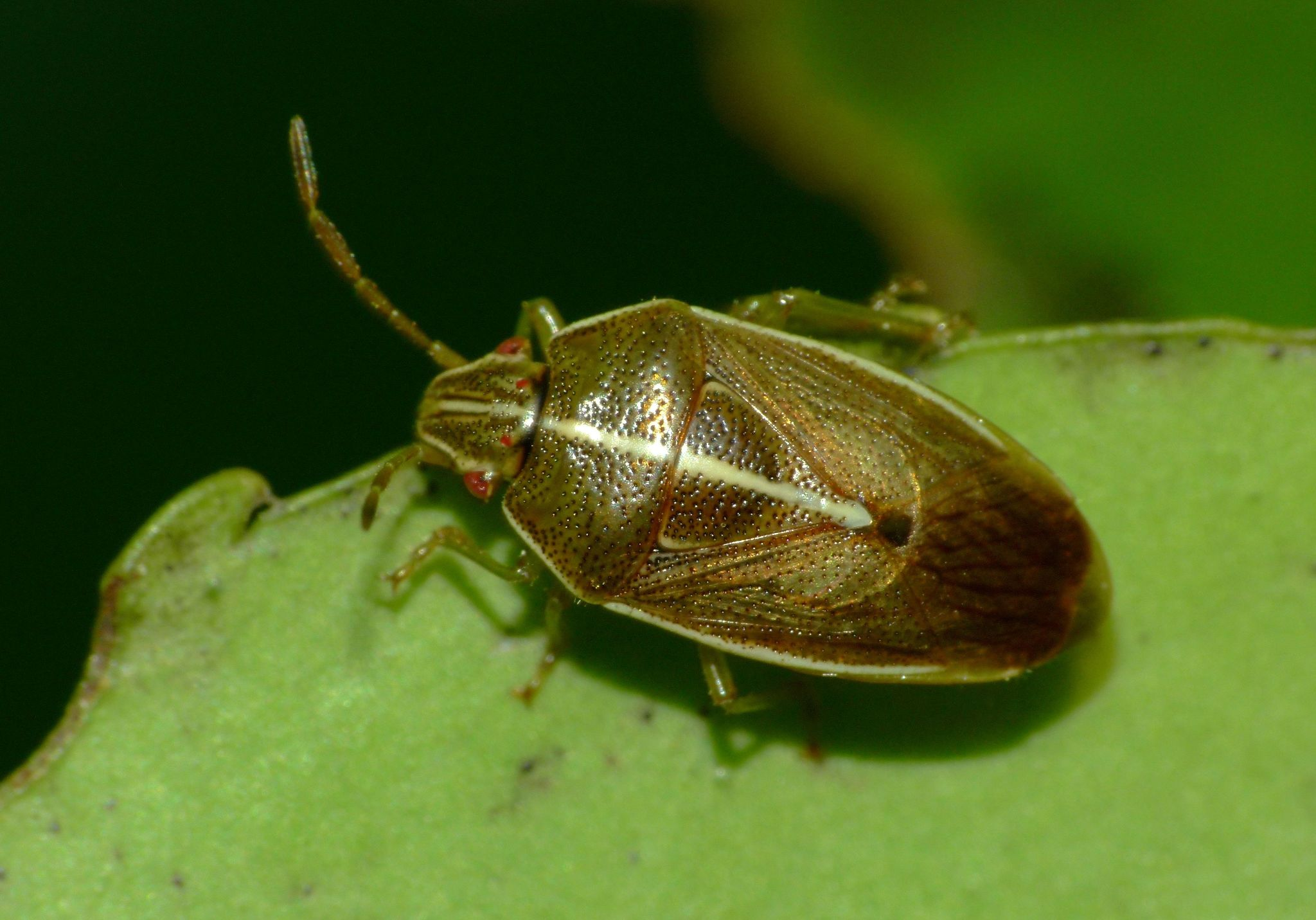
- Rhopalimorpha lineolaris

Scientific classification
- Kingdom: Animalia
- Phylum: Arthropoda
- Class: Insecta
- Order: Hemiptera
- Suborder: Heteroptera
- Family: Acanthosomatidae
- Genus: Rhopalimorpha; Dallas, 1851

= Rhopalimorpha =

Genus of insects

Rhopalimorpha is a genus of insects in the shield bug family Acanthosomatidae. It is native to Australia and New Zealand. There are four species in the genus, of which three are found in New Zealand.

== Taxonomy ==
The genus was originally described by W. S. Dallas in 1851. It was redescribed by J. G. Pendergrast in 1952. It contains the following species:

=== Subgenus Lentimorpha ===
- Rhopalimorpha alpina (Woodward, 1953) – South Island, New Zealand. Localised distribution above 1,000 m elevation on some South Island mountains.

=== Subgenus Rhopalimorpha ===
- Rhopalimorpha humeralis (Walker, 1867) – Queensland, Australia
- Rhopalimorpha obscura (White, 1851) – New Zealand and Chatham Islands
- Rhopalimorpha lineolaris (Pendergrast, 1950) – New Zealand

== Ecology ==
R. lineolaris and R. obscura are usually found in riparian habitat, including tussock grasslands, though they have also been found in human-influenced environments like scrubland and pasture. They are usually found on monocotyledons like Phormium sp. and Carex sp., and appear to prefer monocots as host plants for reproduction and development. Neither species is believed to reproduce on dicotyledons.

Very little is known about the ecology of R. alpina.
