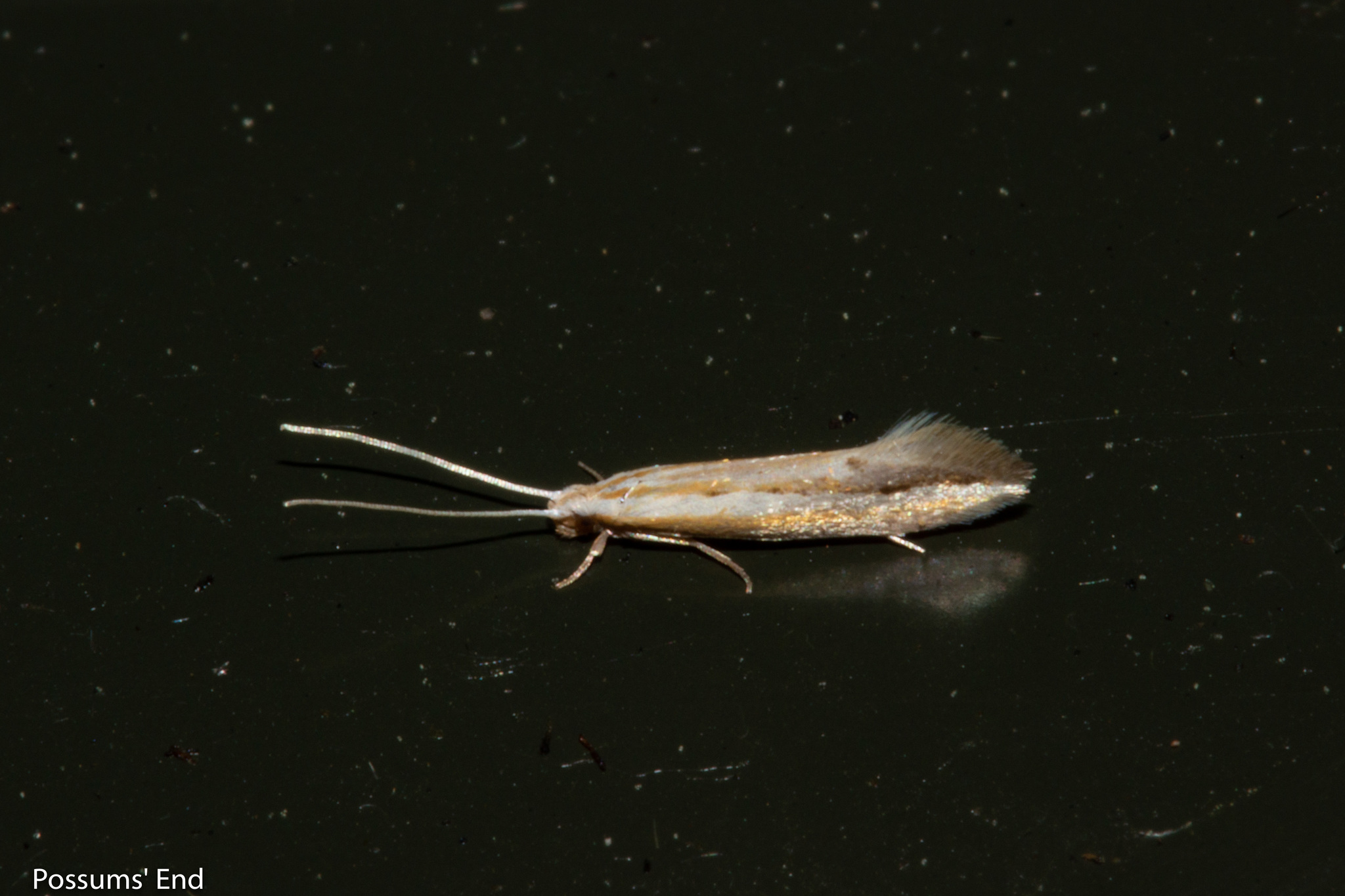

Scientific classification
- Kingdom: Animalia
- Phylum: Arthropoda
- Class: Insecta
- Order: Lepidoptera
- Family: Tineidae
- Genus: Sagephora
- Species: S. exsanguis

Binomial name
- Sagephora exsanguis Philpott, 1918

= Sagephora exsanguis =

Species of moth endemic to New Zealand

Sagephora exsanguis is a species of moth in the family Tineidae. It was described by Alfred Philpott in 1918. This species is endemic to New Zealand and has been found on Cuvier Island, as well as the North and South Islands. The adults of this species are on the wing from October to December.

== Taxonomy ==
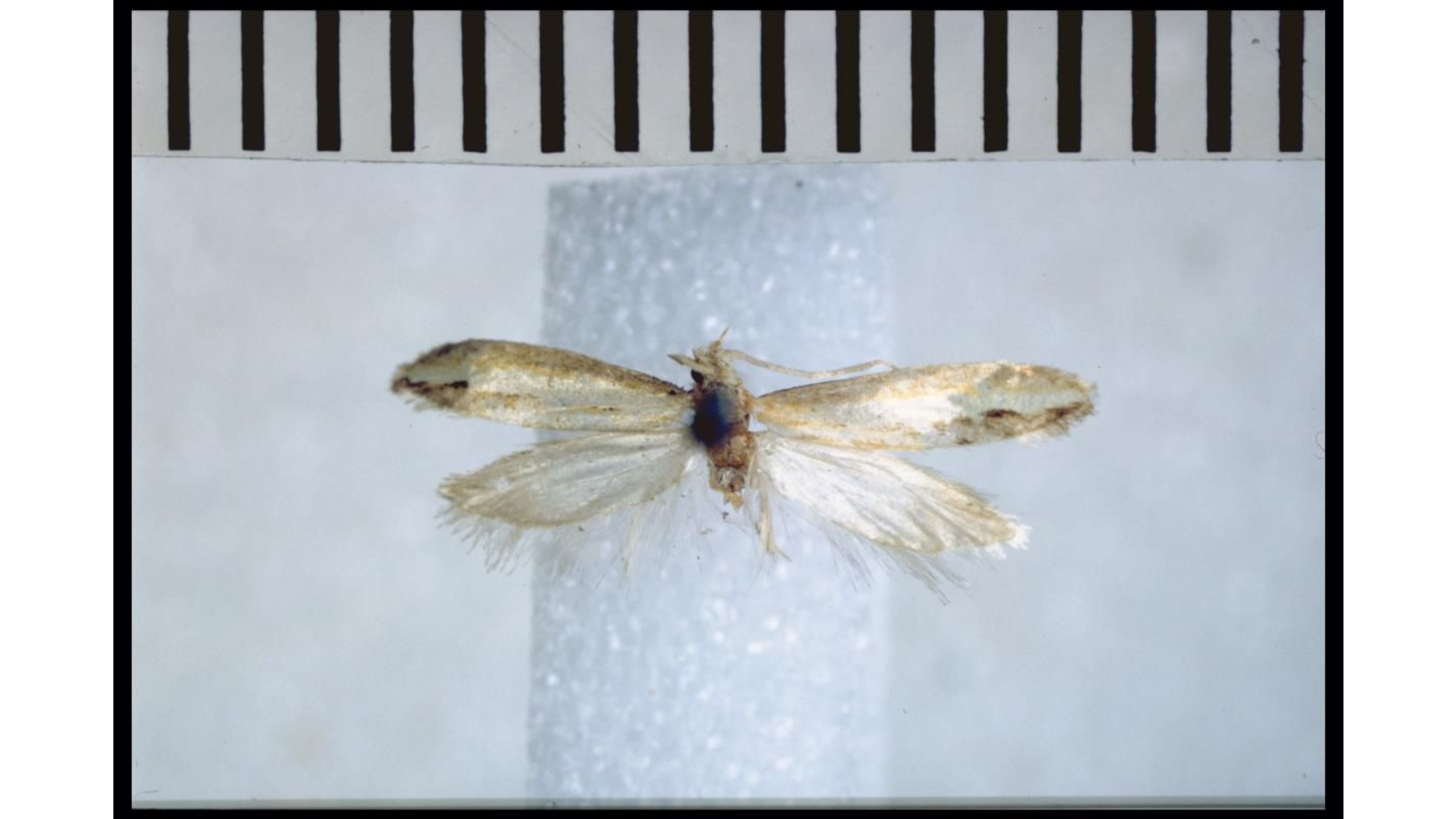
Male holotype specimen of S. exsanguis.

This species was first described by Alfred Philpott in 1918, using specimens collected in Bluff and Dunedin in October, November and December, and named Sagephora exsanguis. In 1928 George Hudson described and illustrated this species in his publication The butterflies and moths of New Zealand. The male holotype specimen, collected in Bluff, is held at the New Zealand Arthropod Collection.

== Description ==
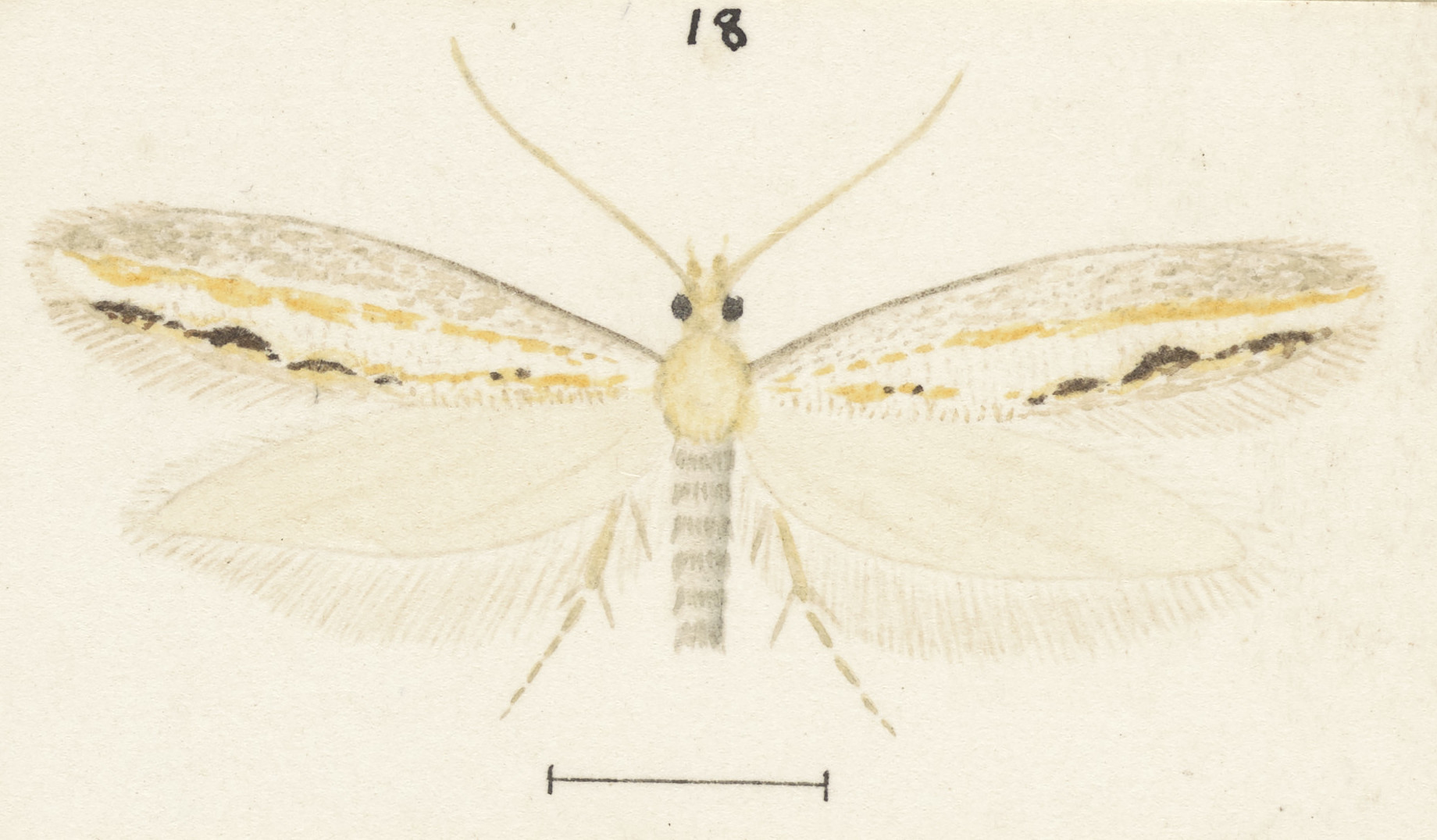
Illustration of S. exsanguis by George Hudson.

Philpott described this species as follows:

♂. 10-12 mm. Head white, face ochreous. Palpi white, apical half of second joint brown. Antennae, thorax, and abdomen white. Forewings elongate, narrow, costa moderately arched, apex round-pointed, termen rounded, extremely oblique; white; costa and dorsum broadly pale-brownish throughout reducing ground-colour to a median stripe; apical half of dorsal stripe irregularly margined above with blackish; a few dark scales on costa near apex : cilia concolorous with wing - markings. Hindwings and cilia shining white.

== Distribution ==
This species is endemic to New Zealand and has been collected on the South, North and Cuvier Islands.

== Habitat ==
This species inhabits native forest as well as wetlands.

== Behaviour ==
The adults of this species are on the wing from October until December.

== Hosts ==
This species is associated with Carex species found in wetlands.
