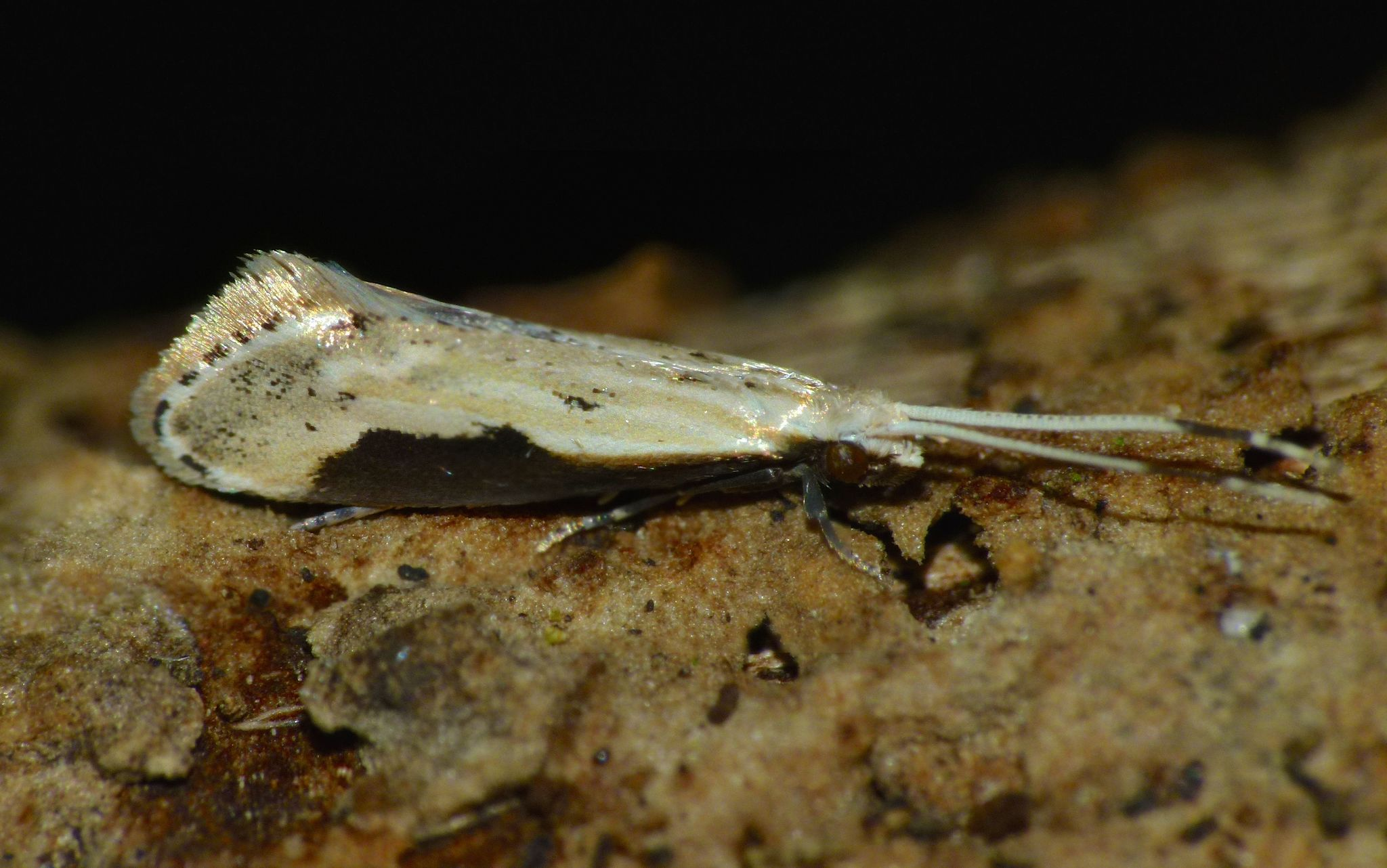

Scientific classification
- Kingdom: Animalia
- Phylum: Arthropoda
- Class: Insecta
- Order: Lepidoptera
- Family: Tineidae
- Genus: Sagephora
- Species: S. phortegella

Binomial name
- Sagephora phortegella Meyick, 1888

= Sagephora phortegella =

Species of moth

Sagephora phortegella is a species of moth in the family Tineidae. It was described by Edward Meyrick in 1888. This species is endemic to New Zealand.

The wingspan is 8–13 mm. The forewings are ochreous-white, the dorsal half suffusedly streaked with whitish-ochreous. There is a thick, gradually-dilated, blackish streak along the costa from base to three-fourths, the apex pointed, the lower margin with a slight projection before the middle. There is sometimes an irregular blackish line below the middle from near the base parallel to the inner and hind-margins to the apex, and a similar almost marginal line along the inner margin to the anal angle, then as a hindmarginal streak to the apex, where it is confluent with the first. Sometimes, there is a defined narrow blackish streak along the inner margin, and a moderate blackish hindmarginal fascia attenuated at the extremities. The hindwings are grey or whitish-grey, rarely rather dark grey.
