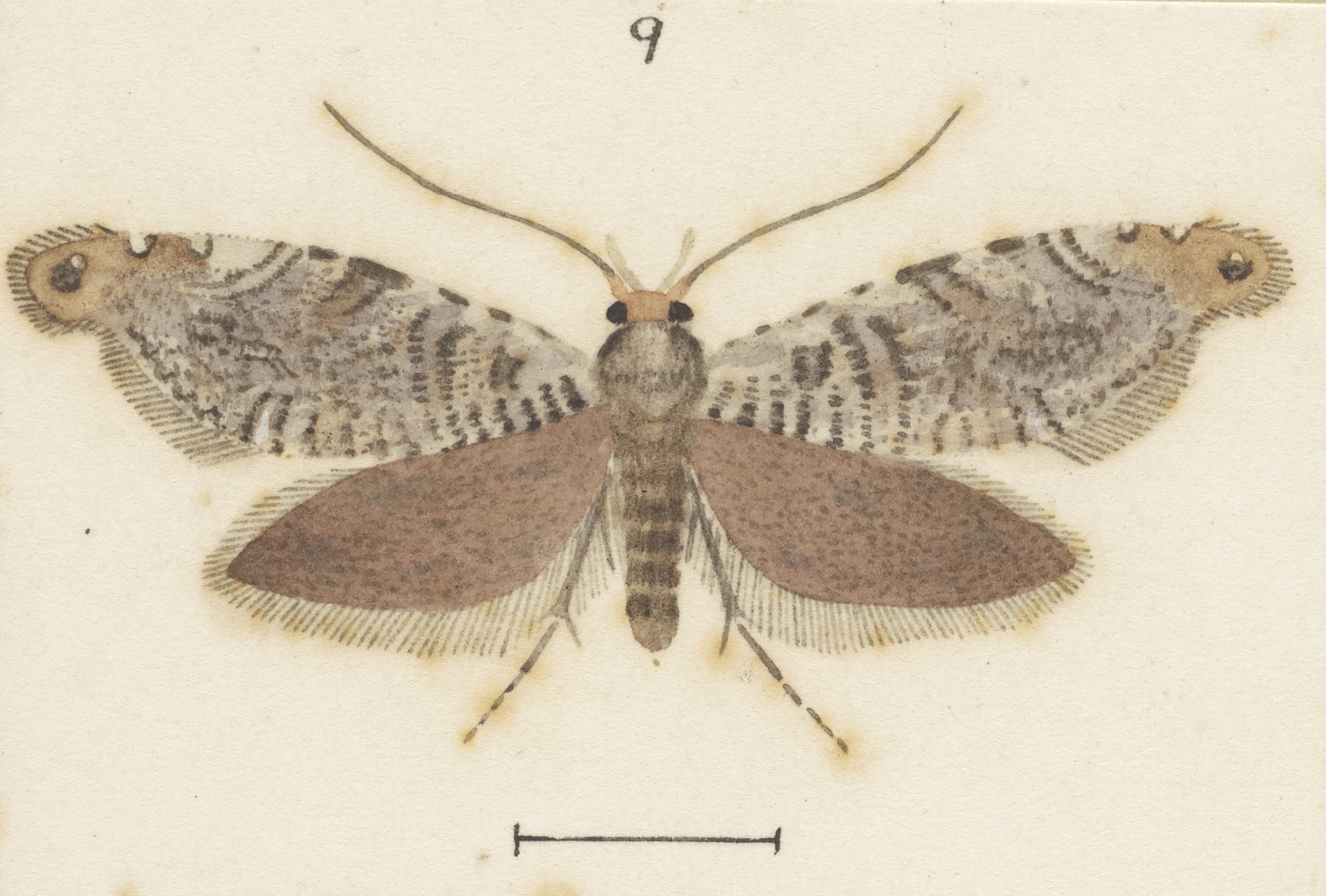
- Illustration of male

Scientific classification
- Kingdom: Animalia
- Phylum: Arthropoda
- Class: Insecta
- Order: Lepidoptera
- Family: Tineidae
- Genus: Eschatotypa
- Species: E. halosparta

Binomial name
- Eschatotypa halosparta (Meyrick, 1919)

Synonyms
- Archyala halosparta Meyrick, 1919

= Eschatotypa halosparta =

Species of moth

Eschatotypa halosparta, also known as the salt and pepper fungus moth, is a species of moth in the family Tineidae. It was described by Edward Meyrick in 1919 from a specimen collected by George Vernon Hudson at Wainuiomata in December. This species is endemic to New Zealand. This species has also been collected near the Tui Mine in Te Aroha.
