= Big Lemon & Paeroa bottle =

Statue of a beverage in New Zealand

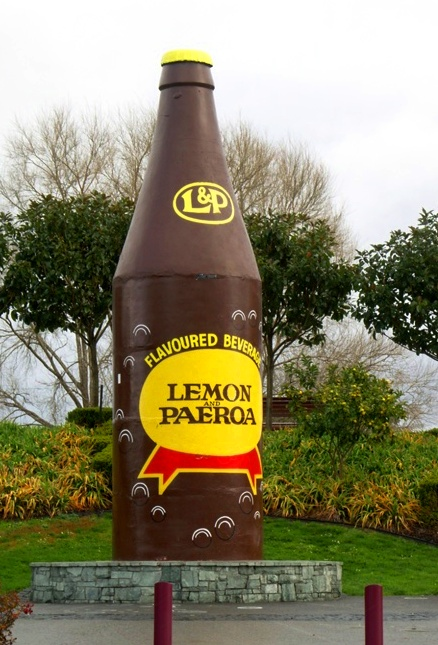
- Year: 1969
- Dimensions: 6.8 m × 1.3 m (270 in × 51 in)
- Location: Paeroa, New Zealand; 37°22′59″S 175°40′28″E

The Big Lemon & Paeroa Bottle is a statue of a bottle of the Lemon & Paeroa soft drink. It is located in Paeroa, New Zealand, where the drink was originally made. It is one of New Zealand's most famous icons, making it one of the most photographed places in the country. It has a height of 6.8 metres (22 ft), a diameter of 1.3 metres (4.3 ft), is made from concrete rings, and is surrounded by lemon trees and lemon shaped rubbish bins in a park around the statue. It is a popular tourist site, and the statue is owned by the council, but the branding and maintenance of the bottle is done by Coca-Cola Europacific Partners.

The statue made an appearance in a Lemon & Paeroa television advertisement in the 1990s. It has also featured in a postage stamp in 1998 as part of a series of town icons, including other big things in New Zealand such as Napier's Pania, the giant carrot of Ohakune, and the shearer statue of Te Kūiti. It is commonly known by locals as the Lemon & Paeroa bottle rather than the L&P, a name more common throughout the country. It is not to be confused with a smaller, 5.8-metre (19 ft) tall, Lemon & Paeroa statue at the L&P Café, which was opened in December 2000.

== History ==
The statue began as a replica space rocket in 1967 for Paeroa's Christmas promotion, which was inspired by Moon landings of the same year. It had the motto "Paeroa rockets into Christmas". It was made with three concrete troughs, a cone on the top, and three fins on the bottom. The statue had room in the middle for an "announcer's box" for reading out daily Christmas specials. It was 6 metres (20 ft) high and had a diameter of 1.3 metres (4.3 ft). Its materials were used to build the Lemon & Paeroa bottle in Christmas of 1968 by the owners of the Paeroa spring at the time. The statue was later dismantled after the end of the holiday season because it became a traffic hazard. However, one of the builders of the bottle has claimed that the Lemon & Paeroa statue did not start out as a rocket. It was later placed again in 1969 in its original location and made permanent by Schweppes, who owned the beverage brand at the time. In the 1990s the statue featured in an L&P television advertisement with the song "Counting the Beat" from the Swingers. On 12 November 2002, the statue was moved from State Highway 2 to its current position in the Ohinemuri Reserve; about 100 residents watched the move, and it took 40 minutes. A park was later built by the council around the statue. In 2018, when the bottle's fiftieth birthday was celebrated, a yellow bow was placed on the statue. In 2020 there were proposals to move the statue closer to the centre of town.

In 2013, after Lemon & Paeroa partnered with Whittaker's to make an L&P chocolate, a Whittaker's delivery van was placed next to the statue to make it appear as if the van had crashed into it. Chief executive of the council, Langley Cavers, ordered that Whittaker's pay for damage caused by the crash. It was reported that the mayor and council knew about the campaign and were told by Whittaker's to "play dumb".

In 2023, the statue was painted white so that it could be repainted after weathering, and have a graffiti guard. In 2024 the bottle was surrounded in a yellow wrap with the text "Warning: freezing in progress" to mark the launch of the limited edition L&P frozen at McDonald's.

In April 2026, Coca Cola, the manufacturer of Lemon & Paeroa, announced that it was switching from brown bottles to clear ones because they are easier to recycle. The company said that the Big Bottle would temporarily be re-skinned as half brown, half clear.

== See also ==
- The great Tuborg bottle, similar monument in Copenhagen
