= Lemon & Te Aroha =

Lemon-flavoured soft drink of New Zealand

- Country of origin: Te Aroha, Waikato, New Zealand
- Introduced: 1888, 2022
- Discontinued: 1970s

Lemon & Te Aroha or L&T is a lemon-flavoured soft drink from New Zealand. It is made using natural soda water from the Mokena geyser in Te Aroha. Lemon & Te Aroha first came out in 1888, was discontinued in the 1970s, and started production again in 2022.

Te Aroha is in the Waikato, which is the same region from which the drink with the similar name, Lemon & Paeroa (L&P), originated.

== History ==
Lemon & Te Aroha first came out in 1888, which is 19 years before the similarly named but unrelated drink Lemon & Paeroa. Thousands of people would visit the Te Aroha spring for its water, which at the time was believed to have curative properties. People claimed that the water could cure illnesses of the stomach, intestines, bladder disorders, nasal issues and gout. The drink has had various names including Te Aroha Steam Mineral Water, Te Aroha Natural Mineral Water, and Te Aroha Soda & Mineral Water. Eventually, the name Te Aroha and Lemon stuck. After Lemon & Te Aroha had transferred between multiple owners, it eventually came into the ownership of Menzies & Co. In 1972 Lemon & Te Aroha was bought by Oasis Industries, who also bought Lemon & Paeroa. Oasis Industries stopped production shortly thereafter and allocated more of its resources toward Lemon & Paeroa. Reasons for the closure included competition from Lemon & Paeroa and Coca-Cola, and issues relating to the amount of spring water collected.

=== Revival ===
In 2022 the drink was brought back into business, 50 years after production ended. This version had new packaging and branding. The revival took four years of planning and preparation, and was directed by Richard Revell. This was after he created the carbonated milk drink, mo2 in 2010. Revell was asked if he wanted to buy the spring's land. He remembered drinking Lemon & Te Aroha as a child, so he decided to recreate it.

Lemon & Te Aroha is made naturally. The spring water is naturally fizzy, and the minerals in the drink also come from the spring. Iron and manganese are filtered out of the water without using chemicals.
