= Lemon & Paeroa =

New Zealand soft drink

Lemon & Paeroa (L&P)

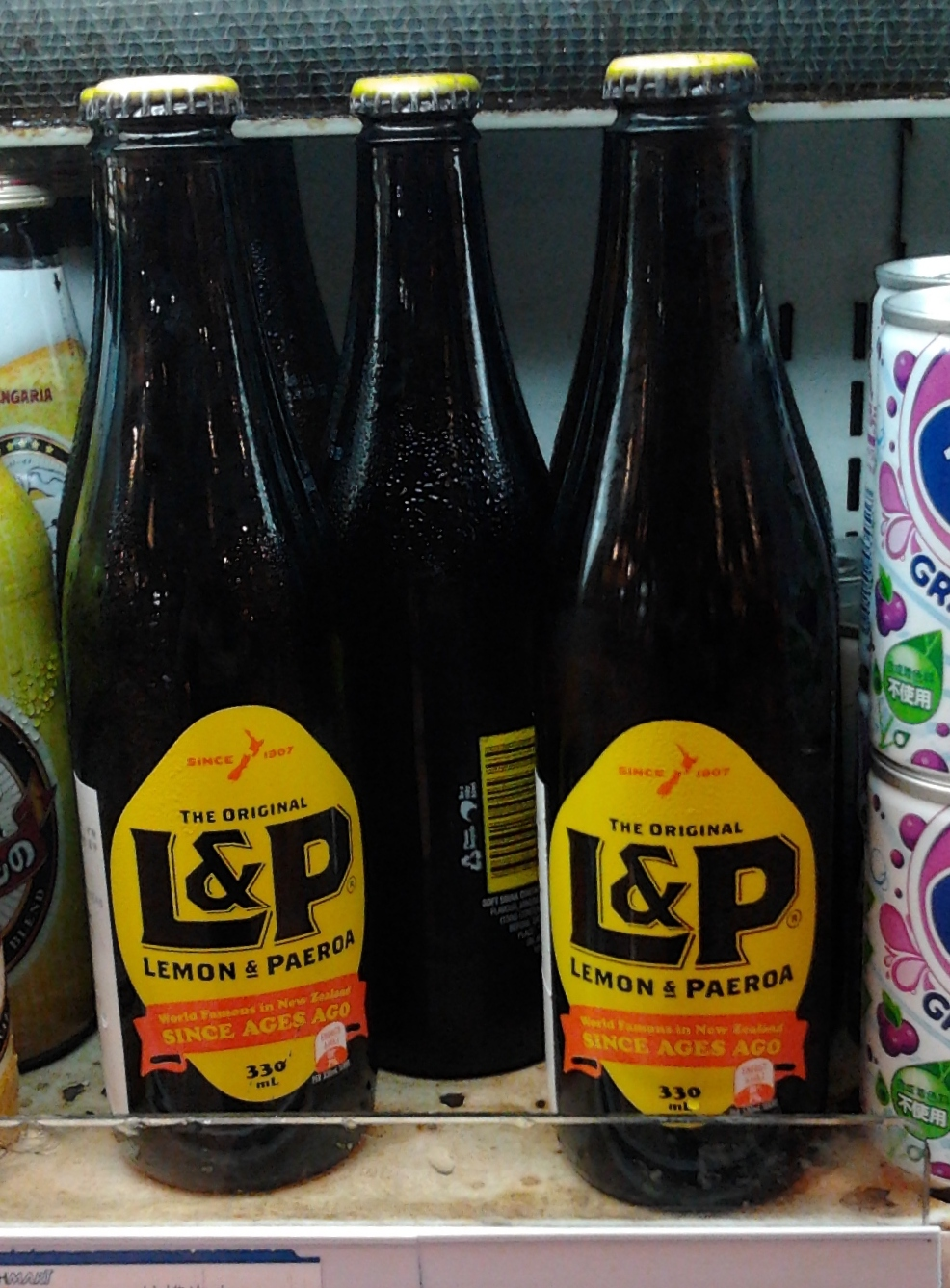
- Lemon & Paeroa on sale in Shanghai
- Type: Soft drink
- Manufacturer: Coca-Cola Europacific Partners
- Origin: Paeroa, New Zealand
- Introduced: c. 1904
- Colour: Pale, light yellow
- Variants: Sugar Free, Sour, Dry Ginger Beer, Chilli & Lime (limited edition)
- Website: www.cokecareers.co.nz/products

Lemon & Paeroa, often shortened to L&P, is a sweet, lemon-flavoured soft drink manufactured in New Zealand. It is considered Kiwiana, and was traditionally made by combining lemon juice with naturally carbonated mineral water from the town of Paeroa. Today, it is manufactured by multi-national Coca-Cola. The origin date of the drink is uncertain, but the brand estimates 1904.

In the township of Paeroa, the origin place of the drink, there is a 7-metre (23 ft) tall Lemon & Paeroa bottle statue. It is one of the most photographed locations in the country, and is also considered a New Zealand icon.

== History ==
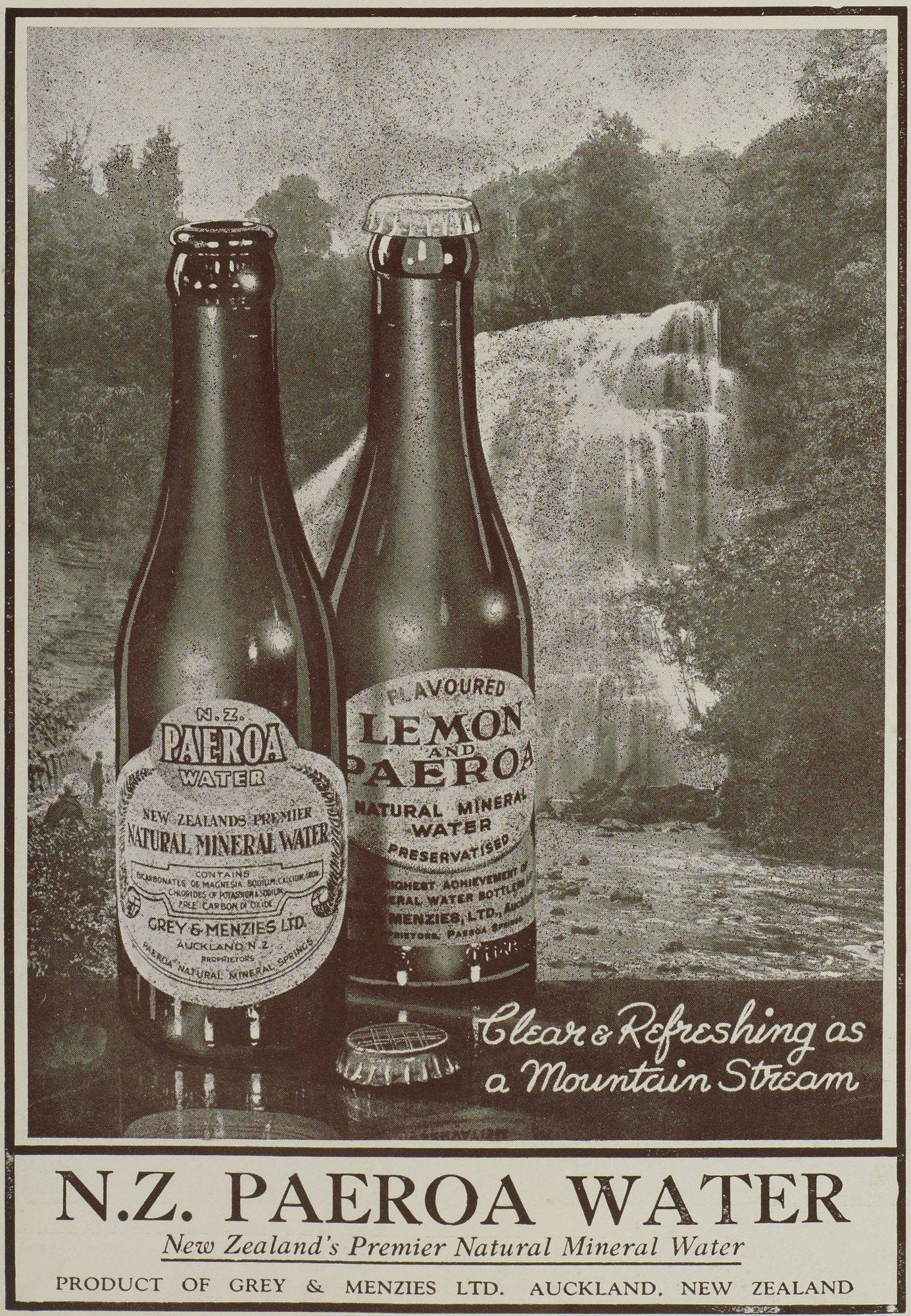
Paeroa water newspaper advertisement from 1937

Originally, Lemon & Paeroa used naturally carbonated water from a spring in the town of Paeroa. The spring is located near the Ohinemuri and Waihou rivers. The land at the spring was originally used to service gold mines, and was a cow paddock when the spring was discovered. Locals frequently visited the spring following its discovery to drink the water. This was a time before anyone had thought of commercialising it.

James Coote and Alexander Hogg, who were both from Paeroa, owned the land where the spring was located. In August 1887 they subdivided the property, transferring the plot with the spring (13 acres) to Sir John Logan Campbell. The land was bought by timber merchant James McAndrew in 1896, who built a sawmill there. The land then transferred through several owners during the next decade until December 1908, when Robert Fewell and his brother-in-law, Frank Brinkler, bought the sawmill and the land around it including the spring.

Analysis of the spring's water in 1904 carried out by Arthur Wohlman revealed magnesium bicarbonate in a concentration of 73 grains to the gallon (1040 mg/L), that the water had a temperature of 80 °F (27 °C), and that the water also had a pleasant taste. Wohlman believed that it had medicinal benefits, such as for constipation. Wohlman believed that due to the colony's widespread consumption of tea, demand for the spring's water would be limited.

In 1909 Fewell started bottling the spring water commercially. He erected a steam pump at the spring and built a concrete reservoir to hold the water pumped up. A bottling plant was constructed that could manage 500 dozen bottles per day. Samples of the water were exhibited at the Auckland Winter Exhibition in May 1909. Fewell incorporated the Paeroa Natural Mineral Water Company in March 1910. This company sold cases of bottled mineral water rather than Lemon & Paeroa. Fewell's factory burnt down in July 1912, but was probably rebuilt as the bottled water continued to be sold. Fewell left Paeroa to live in Auckland in 1914.

In 1915, the Paeroa Natural Mineral Water Company and the property the spring sits on was sold to Grey & Menzies Limited, and by November 1915 'Lemon and Paeroa' was being advertised. In 1916 Grey & Menzies advertised their "new idea" of bottled Paeroa mineral water with added lemon. Grey & Menzies later opened a new factory in Paeroa in 1926 producing plain mineral water, but also had a factory in Auckland.

Water from Paeroa was transported in barrels by trucks and tankers to the Auckland factory, where Lemon & Paeroa was made. It took until 1934 for the Lemon & Paeroa label design to be trademarked, although the name itself was not trademarked at the time. This was because place names (Paeroa) and generic fruit are often not trademarkable. In 1934 L&P started to be manufactured in the Paeroa factory. In 1960 the company was bought by New Zealand Breweries Ltd, which was later acquired by Schweppes. In 1963 Menzies & Co merged with Hamilton-based bottlers CL Innes, and L&P took on the Innes Tartan as a motif on the neck of the L&P bottle. In the 1960s the well of the spring was lined with concrete that went 13 metres (43 ft) deep, and in 1970 a pipeline was laid from the well to the factory. Due to the carbon dioxide from the well causing breathing issues for workers, there was difficulty upgrading it. The crane first chosen for these upgrades could not lift as much weight as required, meaning that a new crane had to be used. In 1969 Lemon & Paeroa won the British Bottlers' Institute Diploma of Excellence Award, the only non-British company to do so. Innes Tartan and Schweppes was acquired by Oasis Industries in the late 1970s, who were later bought by Coca Cola in 1989.

In the 1970s the Paeroa factory was upgraded, increasing the floor space to 1,115 square metres (12,000 sq ft). Around this time, a new spring water pipe was placed between the Paeroa factory and the Railway Reserve, which pumped filtered Paeroa spring water, allowing the public to drink the spring's water for free by using a hand pump in a kiosk. It was smashed multiple times by vandals, causing the system's closure eighteen months later. By the 1970s, water used in Lemon & Paeroa was made artificially rather than coming from the spring. To make sure that the artificial water tastes the same as the original, checks were made between the artificial and spring water. In July 1980 the factory in Paeroa closed. L & P production shifted to Auckland, and the drink is now manufactured by Coca-Cola.

In 1995 a complaint was made under the Fair Trading Act to the Commerce Commission, stating that as the water used in the drink now comes from Auckland rather than the Paeroa spring, it should renamed to Lemon & Panmure (Panmure is the current location of the water supply), or production moved back to Paeroa. The Commerce Commission said that no action was necessary.

== Branding and packaging ==
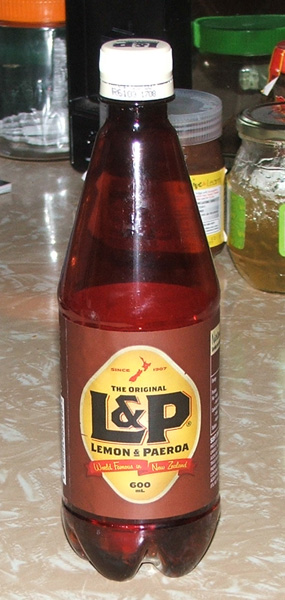
Bottle design from 2005

In 1982–1983, two-litre bottles were released for L&P, up from the previous maximum of 1.25 litres.

The brand was redesigned in 2005, changing the label to a "retro" style. After advertising marking the rebrand, the new branding was rolled out three months later in stores so that people would recognise the new bottle designs. In 2012 the branding was redesigned by Dow Design with the intention of making it look more up to date and in line with the younger generation. This included changing the cream coloured lid to a yellow one. The branding was changed again in 2016. It included a logo change and new bottle shapes, allowing for better differentiation of the various L&P flavours.

In 2022 Coca-Cola announced that they were considering changing the plastic on the bottles from brown to clear, which would make recycling of the bottle easier. A similar change had already been made with Sprite bottles. Critics including Hauraki District Mayor Toby Adams have mentioned that because the brown bottle is iconic, people may have a hard time supporting the change. Adams said that if the reason of change (recycling) was given to consumers, they would be more likely to accept it. When asked if he thought the colour change would affect tourist numbers to the 7-metre (23 ft) L&P statue in Paeroa, Adams said he believed tourists are attracted to it because it is a large and famous bottle, not because of its colour. The change to clear bottles took place progressively from April 2026.

=== Summer cans ===
The summer cans released in October 2018 incorrectly spelt Cook Strait as "Cook Straight". After the first production run the typo was discovered and corrected, but the cans with the spelling error were still put on sale. Head of marketing at University of Auckland, Bodo Lang and brand strategist of University of Waikato, Korey Rubenstein have expressed the possibility that this was a deliberate marketing move rather than a mistake.

The 2023 edition, the eighth year of the summer cans, was the first year that the cans included both English and Māori words.

== Flavours and variations ==
A sugar-free version of L&P was introduced in 2005, dry ginger beer was introduced in 2009, and sour in 2013. In October 2016 Lemon & Paeroa launched a limited edition Chilli & Lime flavour with stereotypical Mexican branding. It was described by the company as "Like getting kicked by a baby donkey". To introduce this flavour an unscripted "L&P Live" show was created, which was set in a dairy and hosted by comedians Tim Batt and Guy Montgomery.

There have been multiple L&P fusion foods, such as a Whittaker's chocolate in 2013, Griffin's L&P biscuit around 2017, L&P Fruju in the summer of 2017, and a Pineapple lumps-flavoured drink for three months in 2020.

In 2019 Lemon & Paeroa created a limited edition set of bottles which were 70 cm (28 in) tall. Ten of these bottles were made, and one sold on Trade Me for over $1,000.

== Attractions ==
=== Big Lemon & Paeroa bottle ===
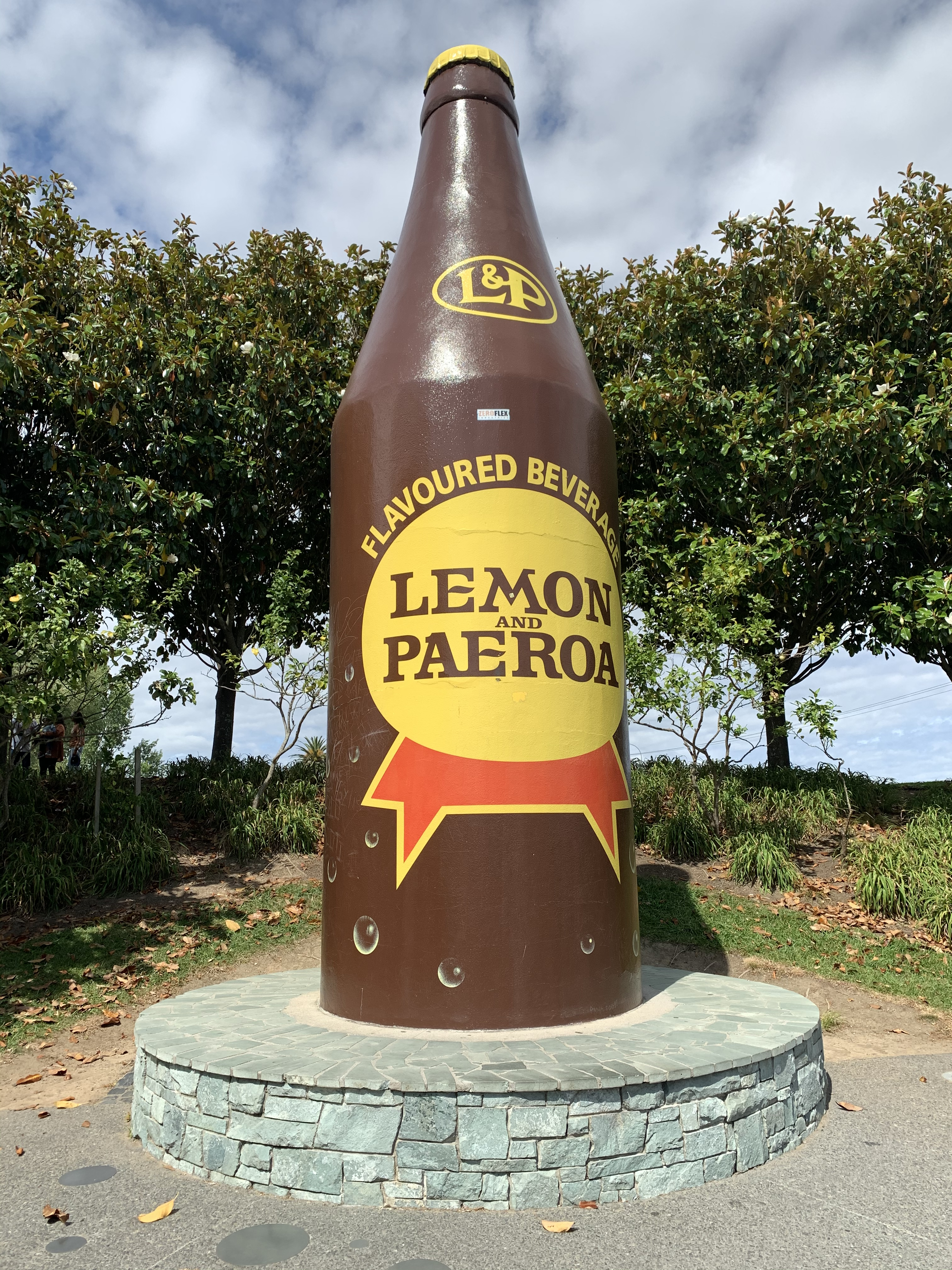
The Giant L&P bottle in Paeroa

There is a 6.8-metre (22 ft) tall L&P bottle in Paeroa. It is one of New Zealand's most famous icons, and one of the most photographed locations in the country. It began in 1967 as a replica rocket in the centre of town for a Christmas promotion of Paeroa, which was taken down after the summer. Materials from the rocket were used to create the Lemon & Paeroa bottle for the 1968 Christmas season, but the bottle was dismantled after the summer as it became a traffic hazard. It was rebuilt in 1969, this time permanently, further away from the town centre near State Highway 2. The bottle became a traffic hazard again due to photographers, so in 2002 it was moved 20 m away to the Ohinemuri Reserve. The move took 40 minutes and was watched by about 100 residents. Since then, a park has been built around the statue.

In 2013 after Lemon & Paeroa partnered with Whittaker's to make an L&P chocolate, a Whittaker's delivery van was placed next to the statue to make it appear as if the van had crashed into it. Chief executive of the council, Langley Cavers, ordered that Whittaker's pay for damage of the crash. It was reported that the mayor and council knew about the campaign and were told by Whittaker's to "play dumb".

=== Lemon & Paeroa Café ===
Lemon & Paeroa's brand team operates a café, which was opened on 16 December 2000. It sells food flavoured with L&P, which includes L&P flavoured ice-cream, eggs benedict with L&P hollandaise sauce, L&P pork ribs, and L&P chicken salad. Outside the café is a 5.8-metre (19 ft) tall L&P bottle outside, which is not to be confused with the 6.8-metre (22 ft) tall bottle in the Ohinemuri Reserve. Having two L&P bottle statues in Paeroa has caused controversy. The café also has a souvenir shop. In 2015 the café was refurbished. It was listed for sale in 2018, and 2020.

== Marketing ==
An instrumental piece written for a Lemon & Paeroa advertisement won the writer, Mike Harvey, the Clio Award in 1978 for the best musical soundtrack in a commercial. In late 1987, a promotional music video for Lemon & Paeroa was made by prominent music artists under the name "80 in the Shade". It is based on the 1960s Motown song Heatwave, and the video was filmed in an L&P factory. In 1988 it was named the country's best commercial in the Listener Film and Television Awards. A long-running 1990s television advertisement for Lemon & Paeroa, featuring the Swingers song "Counting the Beat" and the slogan "World famous in New Zealand", was shot at various locations around Paeroa including the Lemon & Paeroa statue. Starting in the early 2000s, there was an advertising campaign encouraging people to not get caught drinking anything other than L&P. In the two years that this campaign ran, sales grew by 30%, which was higher than the soft drink industry overall.

At the time of the 2005 rebranding there was a $1.25 million advertising campaign that started on 27 February which changed the slogan from "World famous in New Zealand" to "World famous in New Zealand since ages ago". The campaign mocked cringeworthy parts of the recent past, featuring 1970s and 1980s imagery such as stubbies, speedos, and the phrase "bring back the mullet". The campaign started three months before new bottles were introduced in stores so that people would recognise the new branding.

In 2014 Lemon & Paeroa created a "3D pop-out billboard" in Auckland, Wellington, and Christchurch. The billboards had free gifts which could be detached, such as sandals, jandals, and towels. A Snapchat campaign took place in 2015, titled the "Trickshot Challenge". People would buy a limited edition can labelled with "Shot Bro Trickshot Challenge", which had one of four unique instructions showing how to use the can to perform a trickshot. Contestants would then tag Lemon & Paeroa on Snapchat.

Lemon & Paeroa launched a non-TV "Backyard Cricket" campaign. It featured friends and family playing cricket using unconventional gear, such as beer crates as wickets and tennis balls for bowling. The campaign creative said that the goal of the advertisements was to align Lemon & Paeroa with New Zealand pastimes, and that "backyard cricket is something every Kiwi can relate to". Similar use of local icons was used again in a 2017 campaign. It was named "On the lamb", where sheep drank Lemon & Paeroa, escaped the paddock, and then participated in iconic small town New Zealand pastimes such as playing arcade games, visiting the local Four Square, and having a swim at the beach, before returning back to a Māori farmer.

Lemon & Paeroa launched an advertisement in 2019 that featured zombies in a post-apocalyptic city. The Advertising Standards Authority had received 40 complaints about the advertisement by November 2019. Complainants described it as "frightening" and "disgusting", and some complained that the advertisement had inappropriate timing, running before 7pm. The Authority did not uphold the complaints, but the advertisement was later rescheduled to play after 7pm.

In 2021 Lemon & Paeroa launched a campaign named "Space Manu". It started with a man in space, dressed in a space suit, who jumps from a platform to free fall to the ground, stripping down to his shorts, and eventually landing in a pool where he does a cannonball dive or manu. In 2023 Lemon & Paeroa started Manu Applied Sciences Aotearoa (MASA) which had a logo with similar appearance to the one of NASA. A manu L&P swimsuit was created, featuring an advertisement in outer space. The creative director of the campaign said that it was inspired by comments on their 2021 space advertisement. The swimsuit was made to be practical for doing the manu.

=== "World Famous in New Zealand" ===
The "World Famous in New Zealand" slogan was created in 1993 by Saatchi & Saatchi for Lemon and Paeroa. The lead creative of the campaign said that the campaign was "very refreshing at a time when lots of brands were striving to mimic overseas trends. It was one of the first campaigns to truly embrace Kiwi quirks instead of shying away from them". The advertising campaign where the phrase was used would playfully mock aspects of Paeroa, such as by saying "it ain't famous for its [surf, Hollywood mansions, harbour bridge]". The advertisement then cut to a group of people in a car in front of the Lemon & Paeroa bottle statue, and described Paeroa with "But, it is famous!". The advertisement ran for over a decade, and was perceived as a classic. Now the phrase has entered everyday speech, referring to objects that are loved by locals.

In 2005, it was temporarily changed to "World famous in New Zealand since ages ago".

The slogan was trademarked in 2004. Beginning in 2007, Tony Coombe tried to repeal Coca-Cola Amatil's attempt to trademark it. Coombe himself owned a non-trading company named World Famous in New Zealand. He said that the main reason for his battle is that the phrase is a popular "kiwi-ism", a popular part of New Zealand language, that belongs to New Zealanders. A legal argument used was that there had been several non-L&P products with the name, and that people who use the phrase often do not reference L&P. This was ultimately dismissed by the High Court. In a hearing in December 2009, Brian Jones, assistant commissioner of trademarks, said that L&P had used the phrase since 1993, and later decided in favour of Coca Cola. By May 2010, Coombes had spent a total of $30,000 on legal fees.

== See also ==
- List of lemon dishes and beverages
- Lemon & Te Aroha
