= Paeroa =

Town in Waikato, New Zealand

- Minor urban area
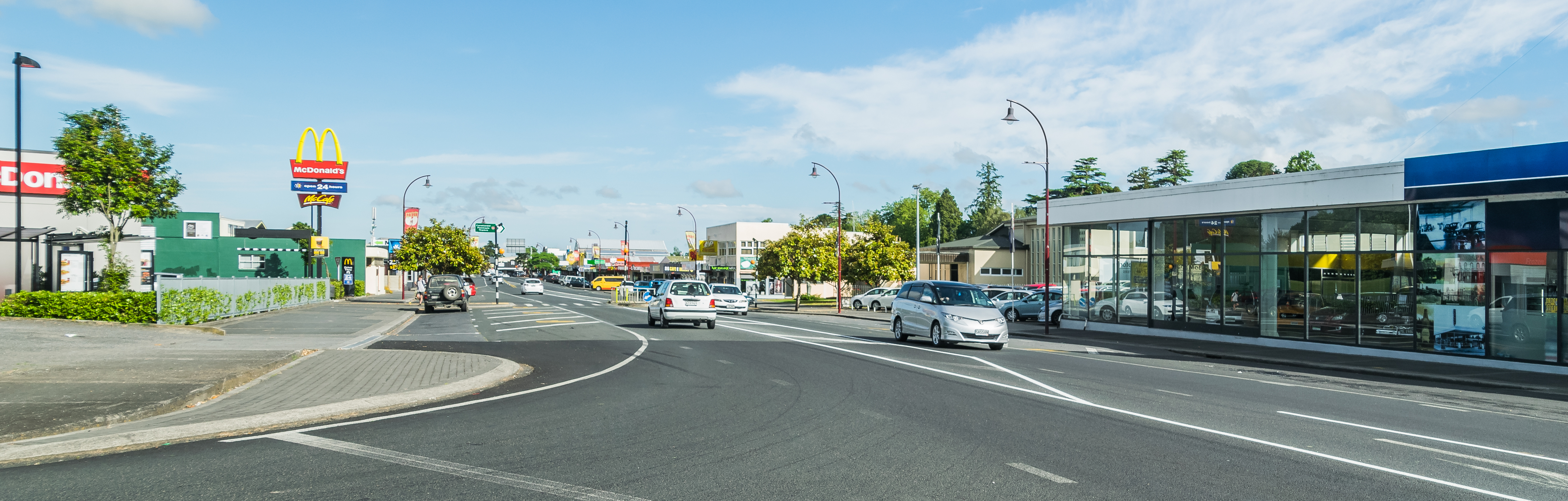
- Normanby Road
- Interactive map of Paeroa
- Coordinates: 37°22′30″S 175°40′00″E
- Country: New Zealand
- Region: Waikato region
- Territorial authority: Hauraki District
- Ward: Paeroa Ward
- Electorates: Coromandel; Hauraki-Waikato (Māori)

Government
  - Territorial Authority: Hauraki District Council
  - Regional council: Waikato Regional Council
  - Mayor of Hauraki: Toby Adams
  - Coromandel MP: Scott Simpson
  - Hauraki-Waikato MP: Hana-Rawhiti Maipi-Clarke

Area
  - Total: 6.87 km^{2} (2.65 sq mi)
- Elevation: 15 m (49 ft)

Population (June 2025)
  - Total: 4,600
  - Density: 670/km^{2} (1,700/sq mi)
- Postcode(s): 3600

Paeroa is a town in the Hauraki District of the Waikato Region in the North Island of New Zealand. Located at the base of the Coromandel Peninsula, it is close to the junction of the Waihou River and Ohinemuri River, and is approximately 20 kilometres (12.4 miles) south of the Firth of Thames.

New Zealanders know the town for its mineral springs, which in the past provided the water used in a local soft drink, "Lemon & Paeroa".

The town stands at the intersection of State Highways 2 and 26, and is the central service location for the Hauraki District. The town is about halfway between Auckland and Tauranga, and acts as the southern gateway to the Coromandel Peninsula, and as the western gateway to the Karangahake Gorge and the Bay of Plenty.

== Etymology ==
One can gloss the Māori-language name Paeroa as composed of pae (ridge) and roa (long).

== Demographics ==
Stats NZ describes Paeroa as a small urban area. It covers 6.87 km^{2} (2.65 sq mi) and had an estimated population of 4,600 as of June 2025, with a population density of 670 people per km^{2}.

Historical population for Paeroa town
Year	Pop.	±% p.a.
2006	3,891	—
2013	3,798	−0.34%
2018	4,269	+2.37%
2023	4,458	+0.87%

Paeroa had a population of 4,458 in the 2023 New Zealand census, an increase of 189 people (4.4%) since the 2018 census, and an increase of 660 people (17.4%) since the 2013 census. There were 2,088 males, 2,352 females and 15 people of other genders in 1,800 dwellings. 2.4% of people identified as LGBTIQ+. The median age was 51.5 years (compared with 38.1 years nationally). There were 705 people (15.8%) aged under 15 years, 639 (14.3%) aged 15 to 29, 1,662 (37.3%) aged 30 to 64, and 1,449 (32.5%) aged 65 or older.

People could identify as more than one ethnicity. The results were 77.7% European (Pākehā); 32.2% Māori; 4.2% Pasifika; 4.0% Asian; 0.3% Middle Eastern, Latin American and African New Zealanders (MELAA); and 2.1% other, which includes people giving their ethnicity as "New Zealander". English was spoken by 97.6%, Māori language by 6.9%, Samoan by 0.1%, and other languages by 5.2%. No language could be spoken by 1.5% (e.g. too young to talk). New Zealand Sign Language was known by 0.7%. The percentage of people born overseas was 13.1, compared with 28.8% nationally.

Religious affiliations were 31.2% Christian, 0.4% Hindu, 2.8% Māori religious beliefs, 0.6% Buddhist, 1.0% New Age, 0.1% Jewish, and 1.3% other religions. People who answered that they had no religion were 54.8%, and 8.1% of people did not answer the census question.

Of those at least 15 years old, 375 (10.0%) people had a bachelor's or higher degree, 2,049 (54.6%) had a post-high school certificate or diploma, and 1,320 (35.2%) people exclusively held high school qualifications. The median income was $29,300, compared with $41,500 nationally. 159 people (4.2%) earned over $100,000 compared to 12.1% nationally. The employment status of those at least 15 was that 1,383 (36.9%) people were employed full-time, 441 (11.8%) were part-time, and 123 (3.3%) were unemployed.

=== Rural surrounds ===
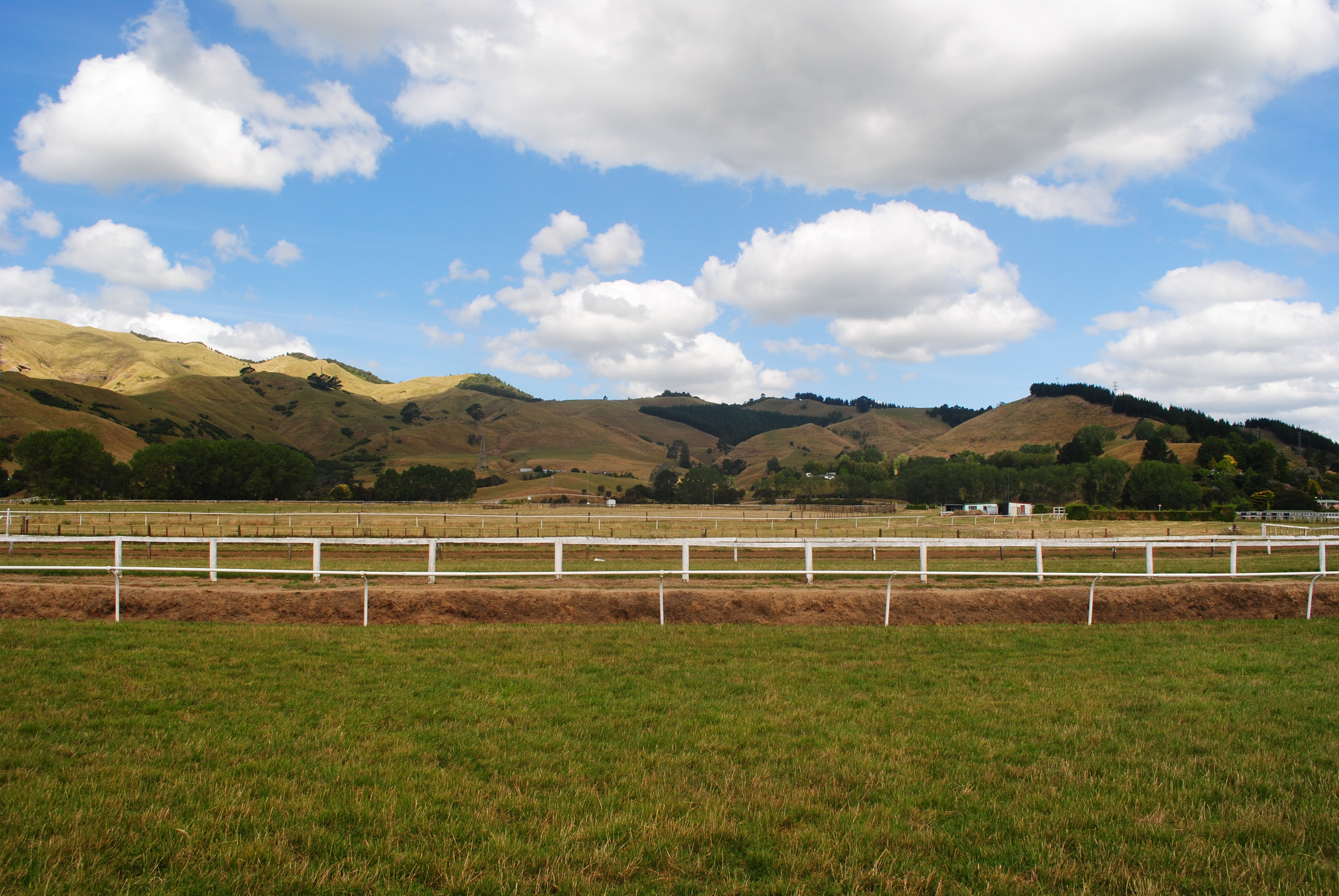
Rural area surrounding Paeroa

The statistical area of Paeroa Rural, which includes the localities of Netherton, Tirohia and Karangahake, covers 272.57 km^{2} (105.24 sq mi) and had an estimated population of 2,080 as of June 2025, with a population density of 8 people per km^{2}.

Historical population for Paeroa Rural
Year	Pop.	±% p.a.
2006	1,755	—
2013	1,674	−0.67%
2018	1,845	+1.96%
2023	1,989	+1.51%
Source: source=

Paeroa Rural had a population of 1,989 in the 2023 New Zealand census, an increase of 144 people (7.8%) since the 2018 census, and an increase of 315 people (18.8%) since the 2013 census. There were 1,002 males, 981 females and 6 people of other genders in 717 dwellings. 2.3% of people identified as LGBTIQ+. The median age was 44.4 years (compared with 38.1 years nationally). There were 375 people (18.9%) aged under 15 years, 279 (14.0%) aged 15 to 29, 942 (47.4%) aged 30 to 64, and 393 (19.8%) aged 65 or older.

People could identify as more than one ethnicity. The results were 86.0% European (Pākehā); 23.7% Māori; 1.5% Pasifika; 3.6% Asian; 0.8% Middle Eastern, Latin American and African New Zealanders (MELAA); and 2.7% other, which includes people giving their ethnicity as "New Zealander". English was spoken by 97.9%, Māori language by 5.3%, Samoan by 0.2%, and other languages by 5.4%. No language could be spoken by 1.5% (e.g. too young to talk). New Zealand Sign Language was known by 0.5%. The percentage of people born overseas was 11.6, compared with 28.8% nationally.

Religious affiliations were 25.2% Christian, 0.8% Hindu, 0.3% Islam, 2.1% Māori religious beliefs, 0.6% Buddhist, 0.8% New Age, 0.2% Jewish, and 1.4% other religions. People who answered that they had no religion were 60.9%, and 8.3% of people did not answer the census question.

Of those at least 15 years old, 210 (13.0%) people had a bachelor's or higher degree, 921 (57.1%) had a post-high school certificate or diploma, and 489 (30.3%) people exclusively held high school qualifications. The median income was $37,000, compared with $41,500 nationally. 138 people (8.6%) earned over $100,000 compared to 12.1% nationally. The employment status of those at least 15 was that 762 (47.2%) people were employed full-time, 285 (17.7%) were part-time, and 21 (1.3%) were unemployed.

== History ==
=== Early history ===
The west bank of the Ohinemuri River, north-west of Paeroa, was the site of Opukeko Pa, Te Raupa pā, Opita pā and Waiwhau pā, settled around the junction of the Waihou and Ohinemuri Rivers (originally due west of Paeroa). Te Raupa in particular was a heavily settled pā, likely settled between 1450 and 1500. The area was settled almost consistently until European contact, except for a brief period of river flooding. The area was originally settled by Ngamarama Ngati Tara, Ngati Koi [Bassett Kay, The Story of Ngati Tara Tokanui, Ngati Koi. Wai 714, 2001. pp 5.7.42] Ngāti Hako, and by Ngāti Tamaterā from the 1600s.

Captain James Cook explored the Waihou River in 1779, taking a long-boat up as far as Netherton, just a couple of miles from where the town of Paeroa was built 100 years on. Samuel Marsden visited Raupa settlement in June 1820 for missionary work, and was impressed by the scale of wooden buildings he saw, and the number of people who settled in the area. During the Musket Wars, Ngāpuhi attacked the settlements in December 1821. Raupa was successfully defended, however the residents soon sought refuge in the Waikato. In 1830, Ngāti Tamaterā returned to the area after the Battle of Taumatawiwi, however settled further south than the original settlements, and used Te Raupa as a burial site until the 1850s, when the iwi converted to Christianity.

The area was briefly explored in October 1826 by Captain James Herd, in command of the Lambton and the Isabella (or Rosanna). Herd was sent on an exploratory mission by the first organisation to be known as the New Zealand Company and claimed to have bought one million acres (400,000 ha) of land from local Māori in Hokianga and Manukau.

By 1869, anticipating the rush to the Ohinemuri Goldfields, considerable numbers of miners camped at Cashell's Landing "Puke".

=== Development of Paeroa township ===
In 1870, Asher Cassrels, a Lithuanian, leased the block of land known as Paeroa from Māori. This included Primrose Hill and most of what is now the town centre.

When James Mackay (surveyor) and Sir David McLean (Minister of Mines) completed negotiations six years later with the Māori Chiefs, Tukukino and Taraia, the fields were declared open. Six hundred miners rushed to Karangahake, considered to be the El Dorado, on 3 March 1875. A canvas town of 1,600 people with about 20 stores and grog shops set the area going. The big gold reefs like Talisman and Crown were discovered but proved hard to work. Heavy machinery required for hard quartz mining had to be brought via the Waihou River and up to Paeroa. The river was the only highway and with two shipping companies in operation, Paeroa became a thriving transport and distribution centre.

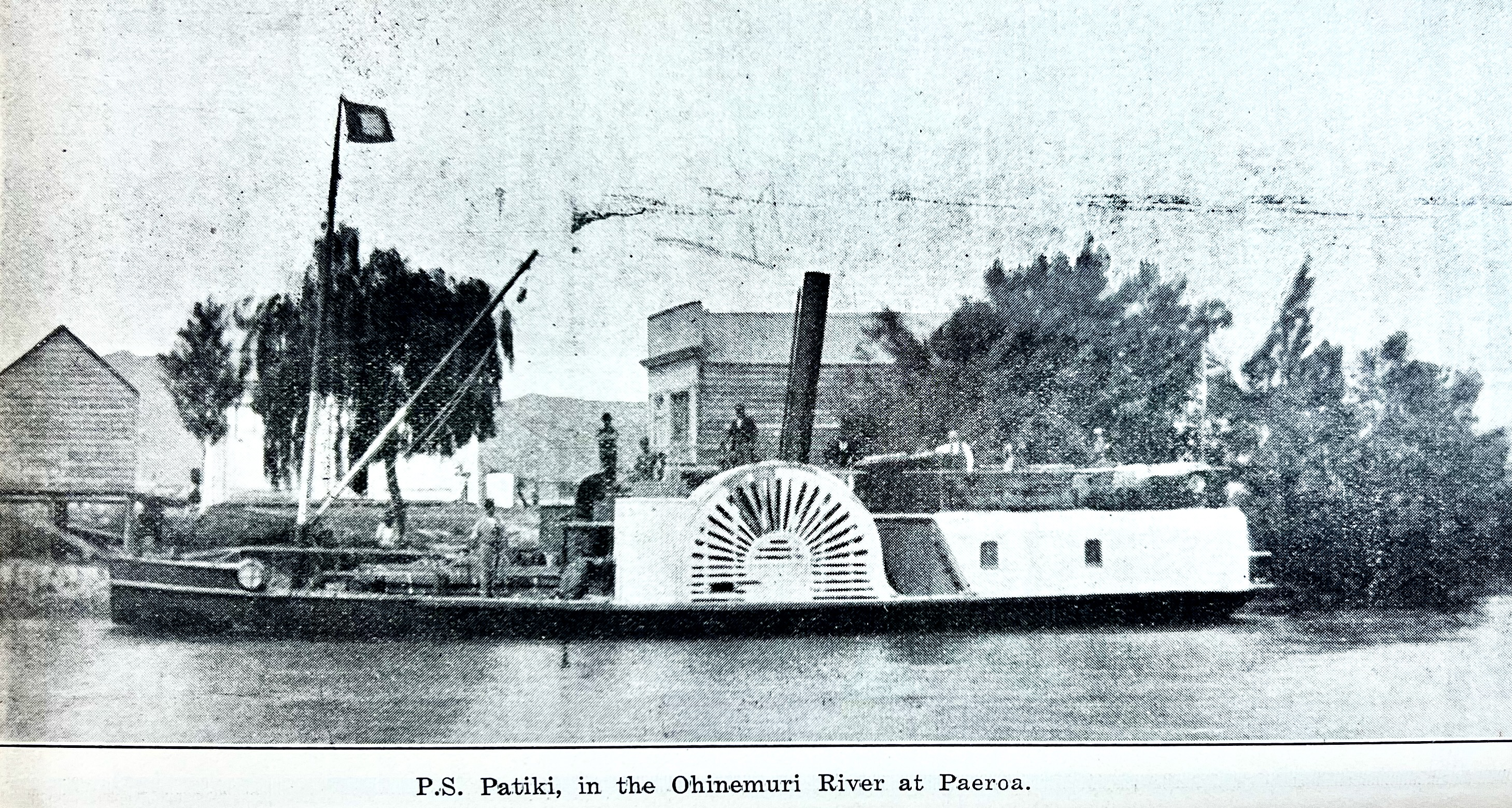
P.S. Patiki (1881-1901) at Paeroa

When the Northern Steamship Company combined with its opposition, the wharves from near the Bank of New Zealand (Wharf Street) had to be shifted two miles (3.2 km) downstream in 1892, and eventually to just below Puke Bridge due to the silting from mining operations. A busy freight business developed with four ships regularly running from Auckland to Thames to Paeroa.

The Thames Branch railway line reached the town in 1881 at the Paeroa Railway Station, and gradually ships gave way to steam, which in turn gave way to road transport. Work on the Paeroa–Pokeno Line commenced in the 1930s, but little was done and the proposal was abandoned.

A historic Paeroa building, in the town centre, is the former National Bank of New Zealand's gold refinery, built in 1914 in Willoughby Street. The building is now a private home and business, hidden from street level view by a ponga fence. In 1911 the National Bank formed joint venture with the New Zealand Mining Trust and the bank purchased a section with a 97 ft (30 m) frontage by 125 ft (38 m) deep in Arthur Street (now Willoughby Street) for 200 pounds.

In the early 1900s, the Waihou River near Paeroa was straightened by making a canal, in order to protect farmland from flooding. By February, 1914, a Ferro-cement building 80 by 40 ft (24 by 12 m), with an iron roof and a 40-foot-tall (12 m) smokestack was completed. Inside was the main refining chamber, two assay offices, weighing room, accounting room, engine and dynamo rooms, two officers' bedrooms, sitting room and bathroom. Detached from the main building was a store room and coal bin.

=== Modern history ===
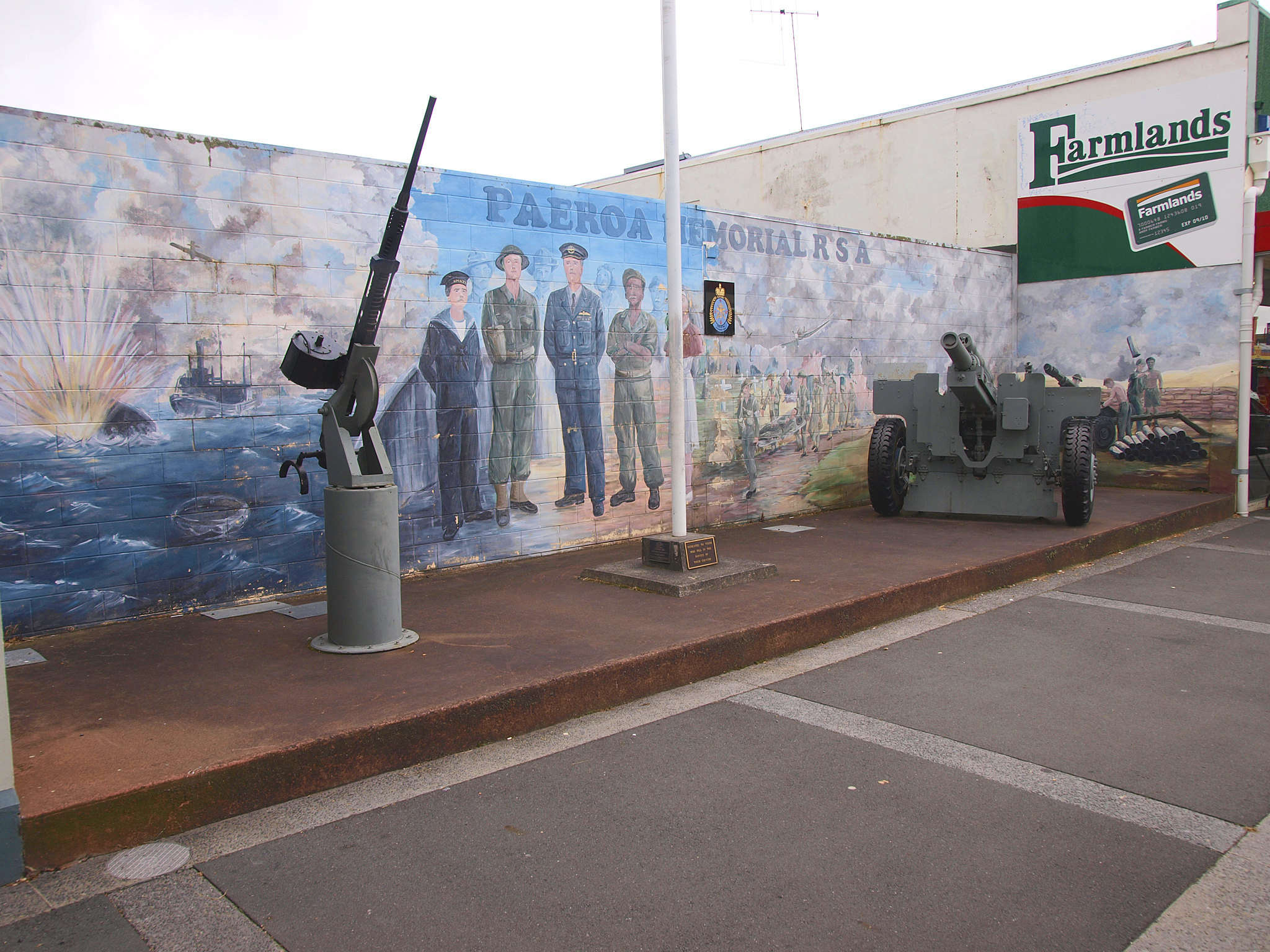
Paeroa RSA Memorial

As late as 1928, the Waihou River was still navigable for larger ships all the way up to the town, and the Kopu Bridge was therefore constructed as a swing bridge.

When Brenan and Company, the largest horse and wagon operator, moved to trucking, they bought out the steamship company and named their trucks after the ships that plied the Ohinemuri River. Waimarie and Taniwha were always painted on the new International or Ford trucks that came into their fleet. When transport operator Sarjant's amalgamated with Brenan, a large truck centre evolved in Paeroa.

As the passenger rail service dwindled, Paeroa eventually lost its railway, so much of the town had its beginnings in supply and transport to the Hauraki and District. The swings of time have enabled the town to boom and revert a number of times.

In 1981 there was a large flood in the Waikato due to heavy rain. Over 2,250 people were evacuated in Thames, Paeroa, and Waihi.

== Culture ==
=== Lemon & Paeroa ===
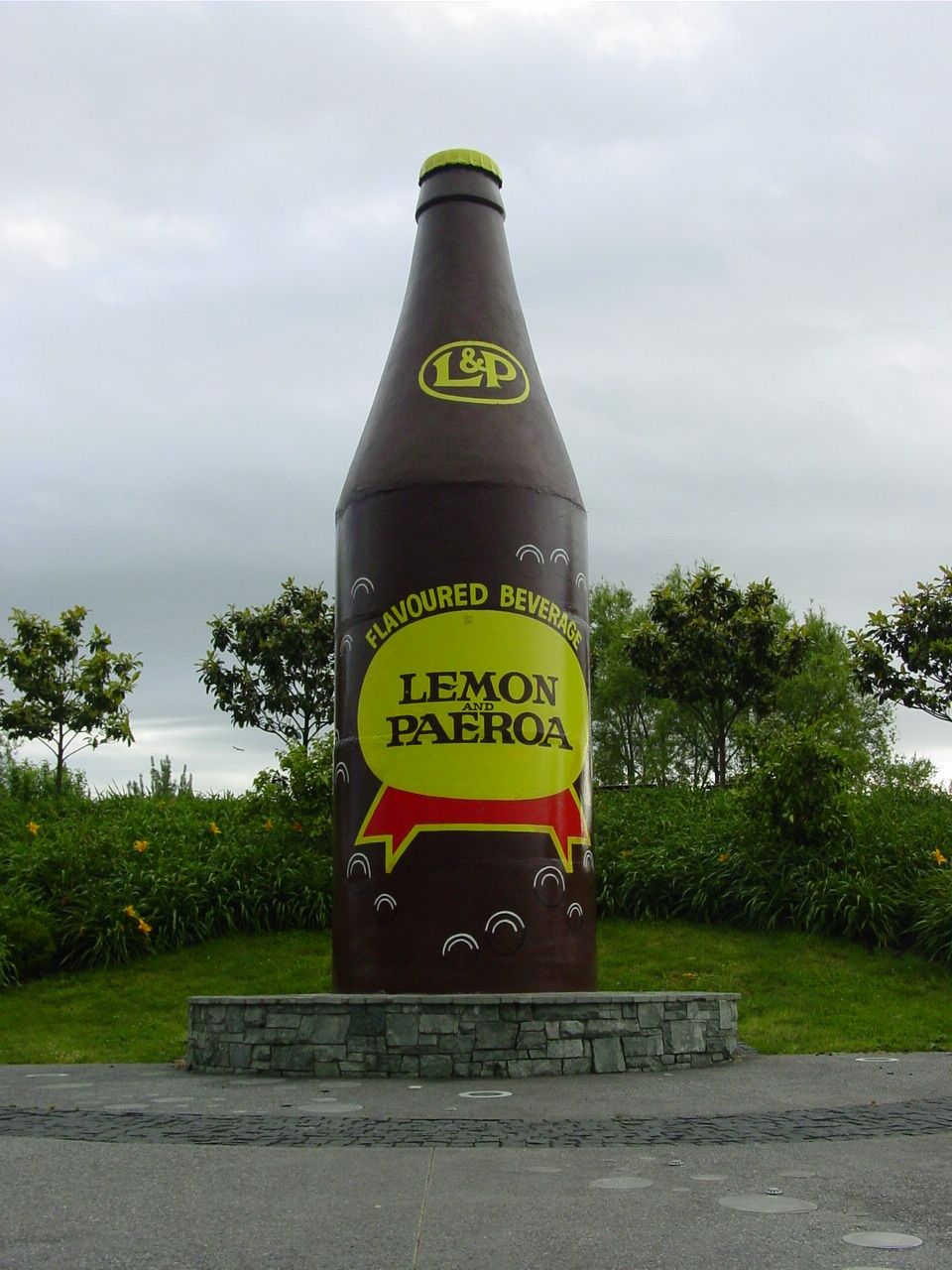
The giant L&P bottle in Paeroa

Paeroa is best known for the soft drink Lemon & Paeroa (L&P) that used to be produced in the town. The soft drink was made with lemon and carbonated mineral water from Paeroa. Today L&P is owned by Coca-Cola and produced on the same production line as other Coca-Cola products sold in New Zealand.

A large L&P bottle stands on the main road as a landmark in the town of Paeroa. In 1994 L&P ran a series of advertisements based around Paeroa, the advert had locals standing in front of various parts of the town pointing out what the town isn't famous for. In one advertisement, a local stands in front a 1930s bungalow making the comment, "It's not famous for its Hollywood mansions". Landmarks and features in the town included the towns Harbour Bridge (a small single lane bridge), bright lights (a flashing chemist sign), luxury hotels (a local motel), trendy shops (an Op Shop) and Opera House (the back of the local town hall).

At the end of each advert a group of people would end by saying "But it is famous" pointing to the landmark L&P bottle in the background. The advert would end with the tag line L&P World Famous in New Zealand. There were 3 separate advertisements all using the song "Counting the Beat" by The Swingers.

=== Events ===
Paeroa is known as the Events Capital of the Coromandel, as well as having a national reputation for horse racing. February is a busy event month in Paeroa and the motorcycle race ‘Battle of the Streets’ and ‘Pipe Band Tattoo’ events both attract participants and crowds from all over New Zealand and overseas.

The horse track was closed in 2014 due to financial issues with the managers of the track.

=== Marae ===
There are a number of Marae associated with Paeroa: Ngahutoitoi the Marae of Ngati Tara Tokanui-Ngamarama-Ngati Koi is South of the township. Two marae (tribal meeting grounds) of the Ngāti Tamaterā are located in Paeroa: Taharua and Te Pai o Hauraki. Each has a wharenui meeting house of the same name.

=== Sports ===
The Thames Valley Rugby Union are based in the Paeroa, and compete in the Heartland Championship. Several amateur sports clubs are also based in the town. These include clubs for rugby, soccer, netball, cricket, tennis, bowls and golf.

== Education ==
Paeroa College is a secondary (years 9–13) school with a decile rating of 2 and a roll of 322. The college opened on 5 February 1958, and replaced the Paeroa District High School which had operated from 1902.

Paeroa has five other schools:

- Paeroa Central School and Miller Avenue School are full primary (years 1–8) schools with rolls of 72 and 85, respectively.
- Goldfields School is a special school and area resource centre, which has students aged from 5 to 21 years old. It has a roll of 92.
- St Joseph's Catholic School is a full primary (years 1–8) state integrated school with a roll of 51. The school was established in 1900.
- Paeroa Christian School is a full primary (years 1–8) state integrated school with a roll of 52. The school was established in 1987 with the support of local evangelical churches.

== Climate ==
Climate data for Paeroa (1991–2020 normals, extremes 1947–2023)
Month	Jan	Feb	Mar	Apr	May	Jun	Jul	Aug	Sep	Oct	Nov	Dec	Year
Record high °C (°F)	32.2 (90.0)	32.4 (90.3)	29.2 (84.6)	27.1 (80.8)	24.5 (76.1)	21.2 (70.2)	21.1 (70.0)	21.0 (69.8)	24.1 (75.4)	26.4 (79.5)	28.0 (82.4)	30.1 (86.2)	32.4 (90.3)
Mean maximum °C (°F)	29.0 (84.2)	29.0 (84.2)	26.9 (80.4)	24.5 (76.1)	21.2 (70.2)	18.9 (66.0)	17.6 (63.7)	18.2 (64.8)	20.0 (68.0)	21.9 (71.4)	24.4 (75.9)	26.7 (80.1)	29.8 (85.6)
Mean daily maximum °C (°F)	25.0 (77.0)	25.3 (77.5)	23.3 (73.9)	20.4 (68.7)	17.5 (63.5)	15.1 (59.2)	14.3 (57.7)	15.1 (59.2)	16.7 (62.1)	18.5 (65.3)	20.5 (68.9)	22.9 (73.2)	19.6 (67.2)
Daily mean °C (°F)	19.5 (67.1)	19.9 (67.8)	17.9 (64.2)	15.4 (59.7)	12.9 (55.2)	10.7 (51.3)	9.9 (49.8)	10.7 (51.3)	12.4 (54.3)	13.8 (56.8)	15.6 (60.1)	18.0 (64.4)	14.7 (58.5)
Mean daily minimum °C (°F)	14.0 (57.2)	14.6 (58.3)	12.5 (54.5)	10.4 (50.7)	8.3 (46.9)	6.4 (43.5)	5.5 (41.9)	6.4 (43.5)	8.0 (46.4)	9.2 (48.6)	10.6 (51.1)	13.0 (55.4)	9.9 (49.8)
Mean minimum °C (°F)	7.5 (45.5)	7.9 (46.2)	5.9 (42.6)	2.8 (37.0)	0.5 (32.9)	−1.4 (29.5)	−2.0 (28.4)	−0.5 (31.1)	0.9 (33.6)	2.2 (36.0)	4.5 (40.1)	6.6 (43.9)	−2.5 (27.5)
Record low °C (°F)	2.5 (36.5)	2.5 (36.5)	−1.5 (29.3)	−1.2 (29.8)	−6.0 (21.2)	−5.4 (22.3)	−5.8 (21.6)	−3.9 (25.0)	−4.6 (23.7)	−1.8 (28.8)	0.4 (32.7)	2.7 (36.9)	−6.0 (21.2)
Average rainfall mm (inches)	63.6 (2.50)	78.5 (3.09)	90.3 (3.56)	99.0 (3.90)	101.0 (3.98)	132.8 (5.23)	172.0 (6.77)	113.4 (4.46)	94.1 (3.70)	87.1 (3.43)	72.5 (2.85)	87.2 (3.43)	1,191.5 (46.9)
Source: NIWA
