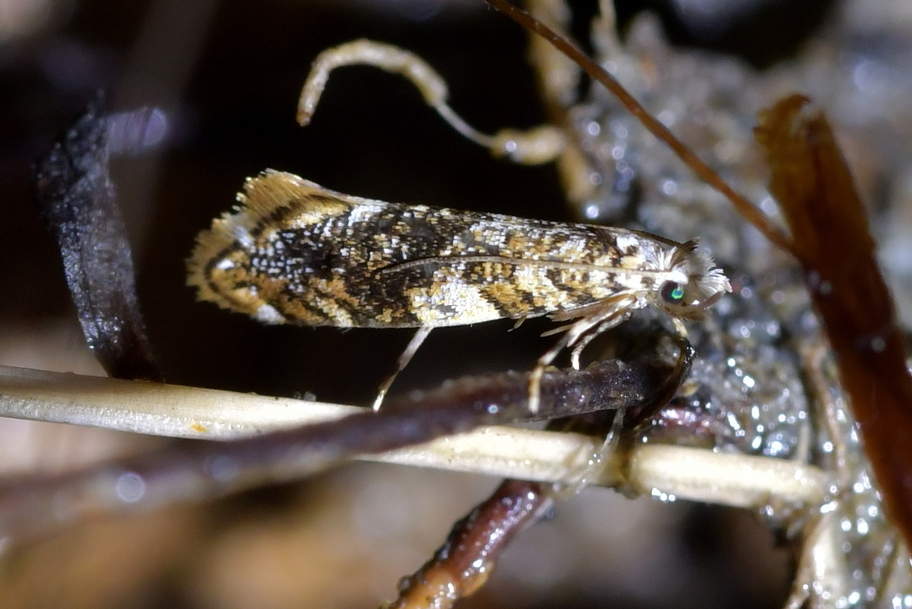
- Eschatotypa derogatella

Scientific classification
- Kingdom: Animalia
- Phylum: Arthropoda
- Clade: Pancrustacea
- Class: Insecta
- Order: Lepidoptera
- Family: Tineidae
- Genus: Eschatotypa; Meyrick, 1880

= Eschatotypa =

Genus of moths

Eschatotypa is a genus of moths belonging to the family Tineidae.

== Species ==
- Eschatotypa derogatella (Walker, 1863)
- Eschatotypa halosparta (Meyrick, 1919)
- Eschatotypa melichrysa Meyrick, 1880
