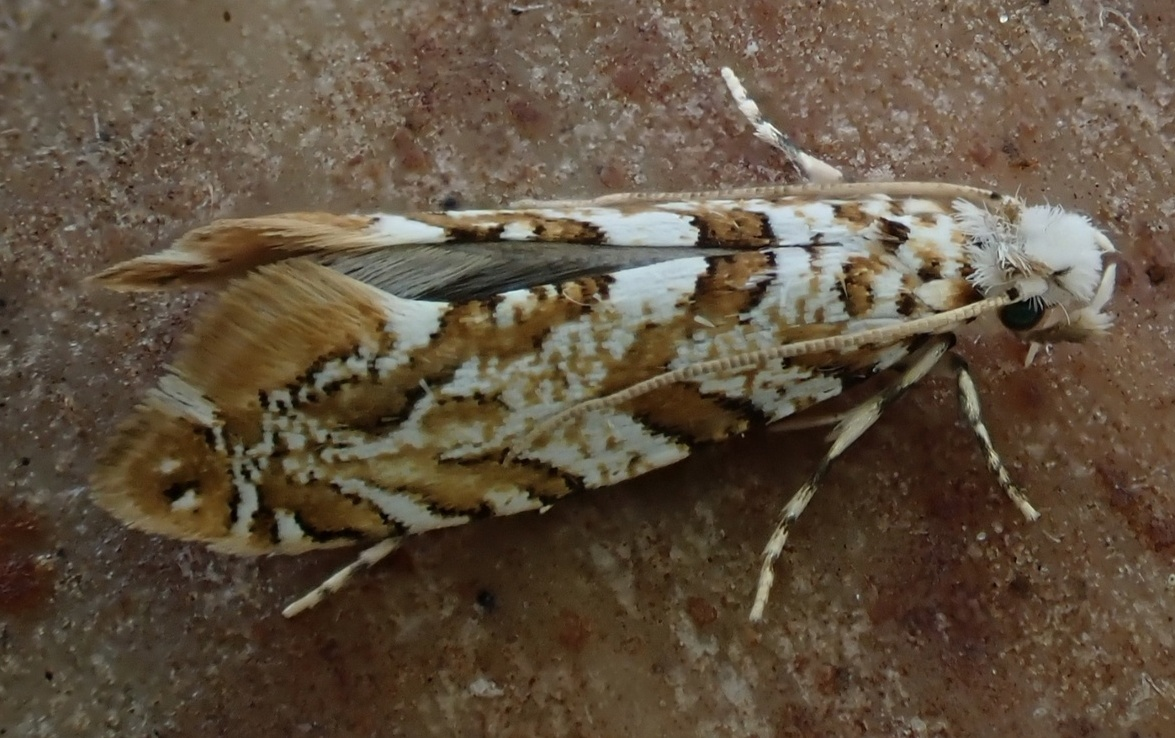

Scientific classification
- Kingdom: Animalia
- Phylum: Arthropoda
- Class: Insecta
- Order: Lepidoptera
- Family: Tineidae
- Genus: Eschatotypa
- Species: E. melichrysa

Binomial name
- Eschatotypa melichrysa Meyrick, 1880

= Eschatotypa melichrysa =

Species of moth

Eschatotypa melichrysa is a species of moth in the family Tineidae. It was described by Edward Meyrick in 1880. This species is endemic to New Zealand. Meyrick regarded them as common in Wellington and Dunedin, in December and January. He obtained specimens from beating forest growth.

== Gallery ==
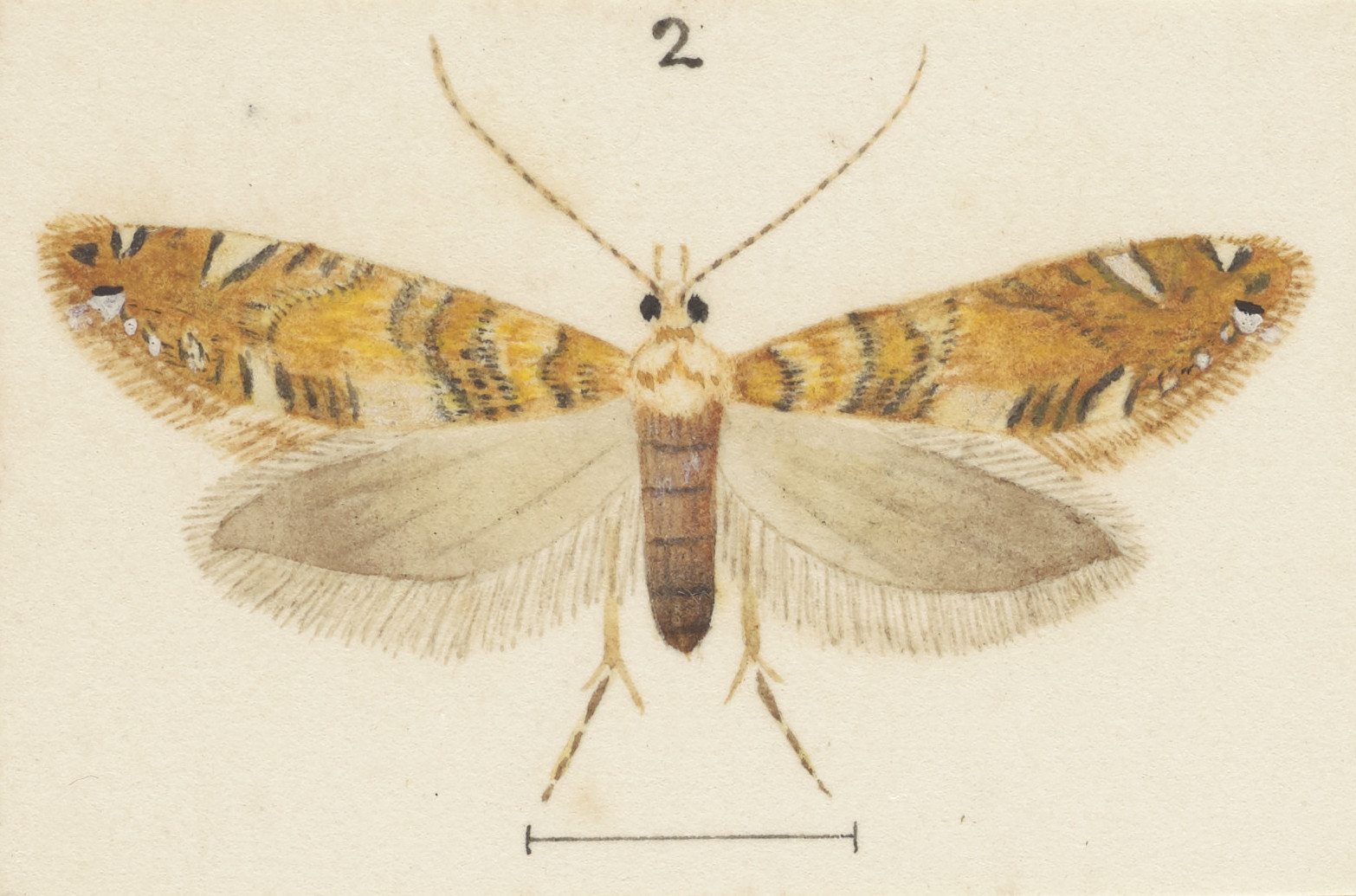
Watercolour illustration of female by George Hudson (circa 1927)

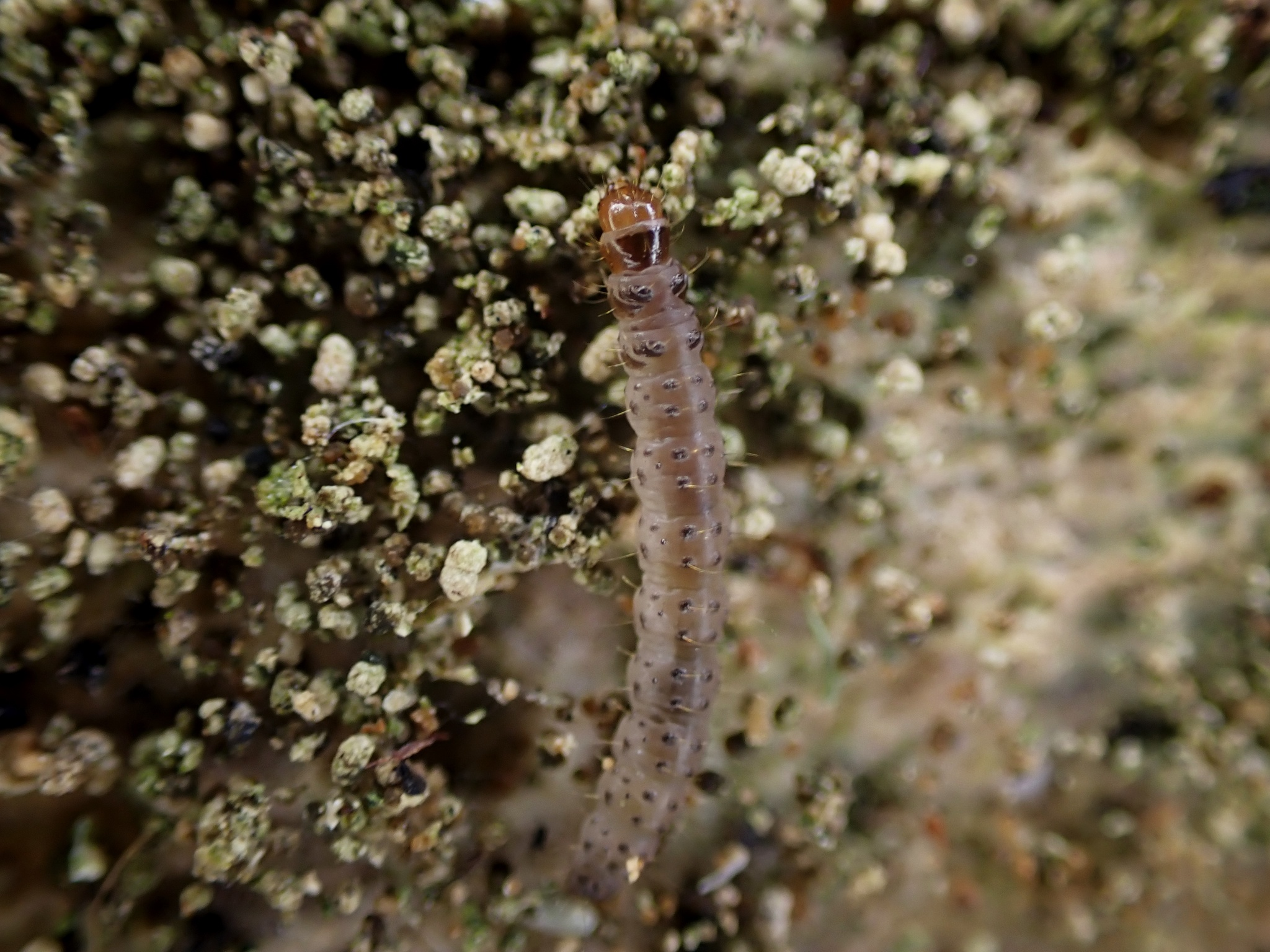
Larvae of Eschatotypa melichrysa
