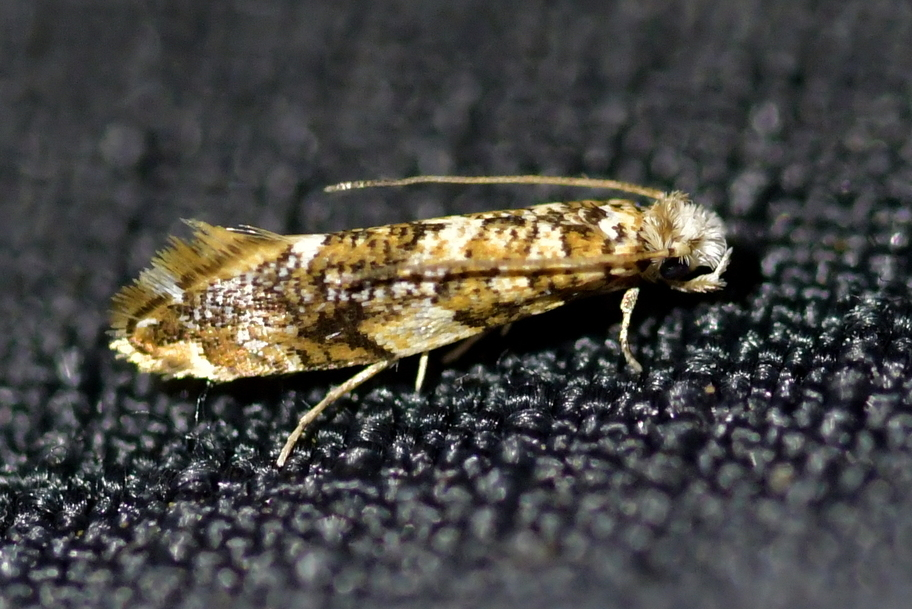

Scientific classification
- Kingdom: Animalia
- Phylum: Arthropoda
- Clade: Pancrustacea
- Class: Insecta
- Order: Lepidoptera
- Family: Tineidae
- Genus: Eschatotypa
- Species: E. derogatella

Binomial name
- Eschatotypa derogatella (Walker, 1863)

Synonyms
- Tinea derogatella Walker, 1863

= Eschatotypa derogatella =

Species of moth endemic to New Zealand

Eschatotypa derogatella is a species of moth in the family Tineidae. It was first described by Francis Walker in 1863. This species is endemic to New Zealand, is found throughout the country and is regarded as being common. The adult moths vary in the intensity of colouration but the confused bluish-white and black discal speckling is always present. Adults are on the wing throughout the year but are most commonly observed from October until March.

== Taxonomy ==
This species was first described by Francis Walker in 1863 and originally named Tinea derogatella. In 1883 Edward Meyrick placed this species in the genus Eschatotypa and synonymised E. melichrysa with that species. In 1909 Meyrick recognised his error in confusing two distinct species but affirmed the placement of E. derogatella in the genus Eschatotypa. In 1927 Alfred Philpott discussed and illustrated the maxilla of this species as well as the male genitalia. George Hudson discussed and illustrated this species in his 1928 book The butterflies and moths of New Zealand. The female holotype, collected by Thomas R. Oxley in Nelson, is held at the Natural History Museum, London.

== Description ==
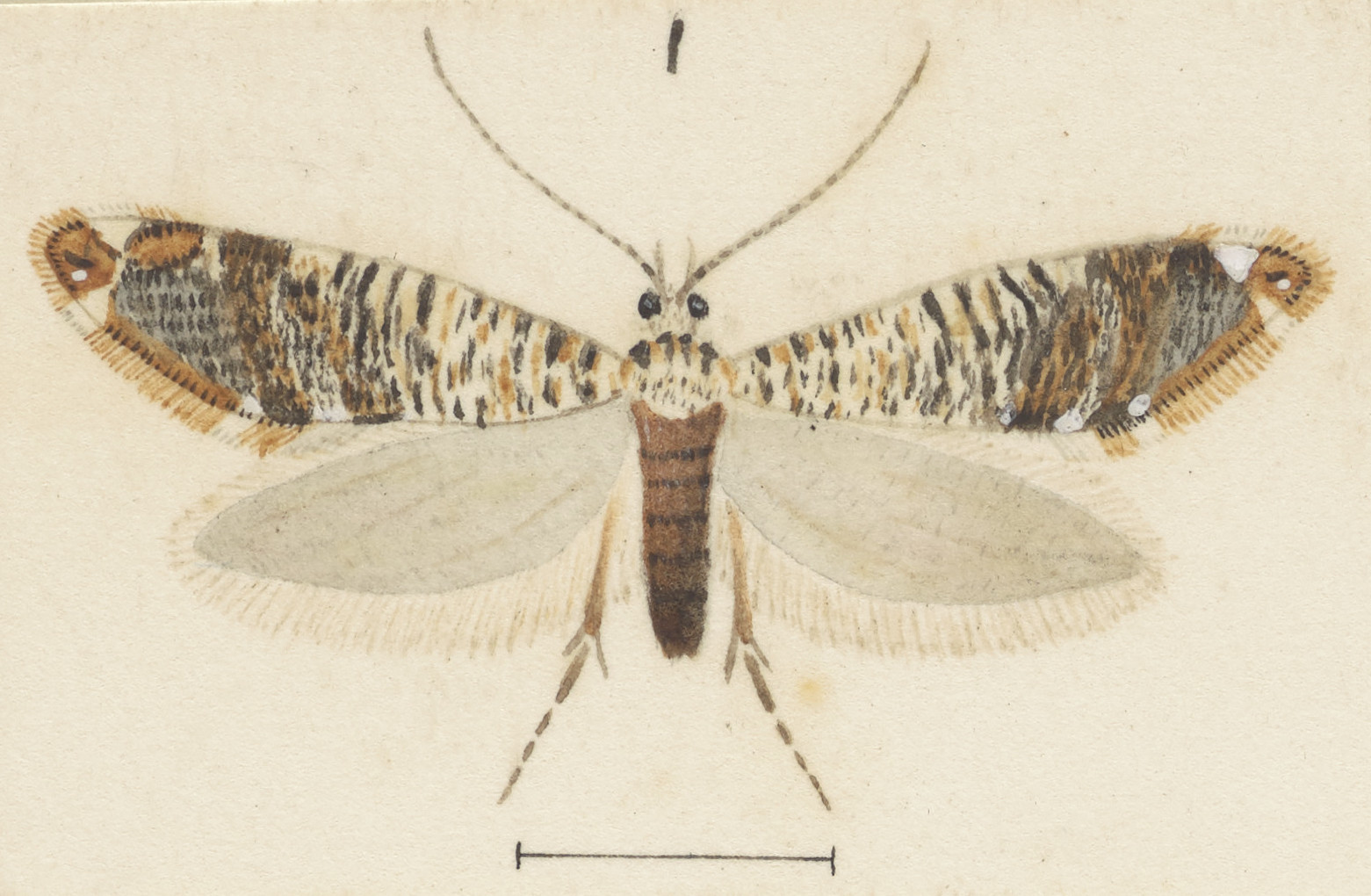
Illustration of male by Hudson.

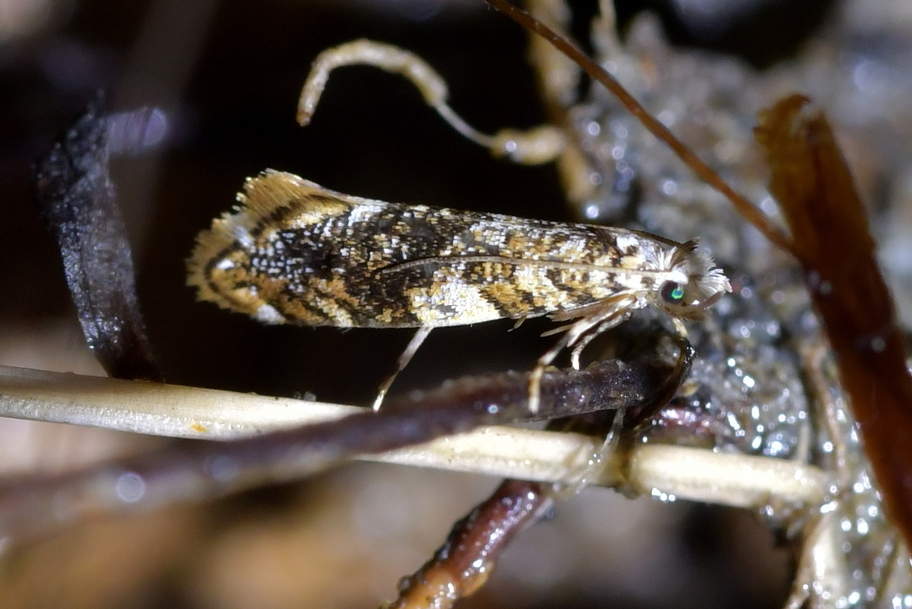
Live moth at rest

Mating pair.

Walker originally described the female of the species as follows:

Female. Cinereous. Head whitish, pubescent. Palpi decumbent, rather longer than the breadth of the head ; third joint elongate-conical, nearly half the length of the second. Antennae a little more than half the length of the fore wings. Fore wings white, rounded at the tips, minutely and transversely black-streaked, the streaks most numerous on the apical part ; a gilded fawn-coloured black-bordered band ; two costal spots of the same hue nearer the base, and three exterior spots, one of these on the costa, the other two on the exterior border, which is very oblique. Hind wings with the fringe slightly gilded. Length of the body 1 1/2 line ; of the wings 4 1/2 lines.

Hudson described the adults of this species as follows:

The expansion of the wings is slightly over 3/8 inch. The fore-wines are very pale whitish-ochreous with numerous confused black-edged dull yellowish-brown markings; there is a basal patch; a curved band at 1/3; a large, very irregular terminal patch, more or less clouded with blackish-brown with a white wedge-shaped mark above and below the apex; in addition to these markings numerous black and pale bluish-white scales are irregularly scattered over the disc, especially towards the termen. The hind-wings are greyish-white, darker towards the termen.

Hudson stated that this species varies considerably in the depth of the colouring but that the confused bluish-white and black discal speckling is always present.

== Distribution ==
This species is endemic to New Zealand. It can be found throughout the country and is regarded as common.

== Behaviour ==
Adults are on the wing all through the year but are most commonly observed in October to March. Adults do not very readily take wing but instead run with great rapidity seeking concealment in a crevice. When at rest the wings are closed over the back, forming a very steep roof; the anterior tarsi are placed forwards, curved and nearly touching; the tips of the intermediate and hind tarsi are just visible, and the antennae are placed backwards on each side of the wings. Hudson hypothesised that this species over winters in the adult state based on worn species being observed in the early New Zealand spring.
