= Te Aroha =

Town in Waikato, New Zealand

- Town
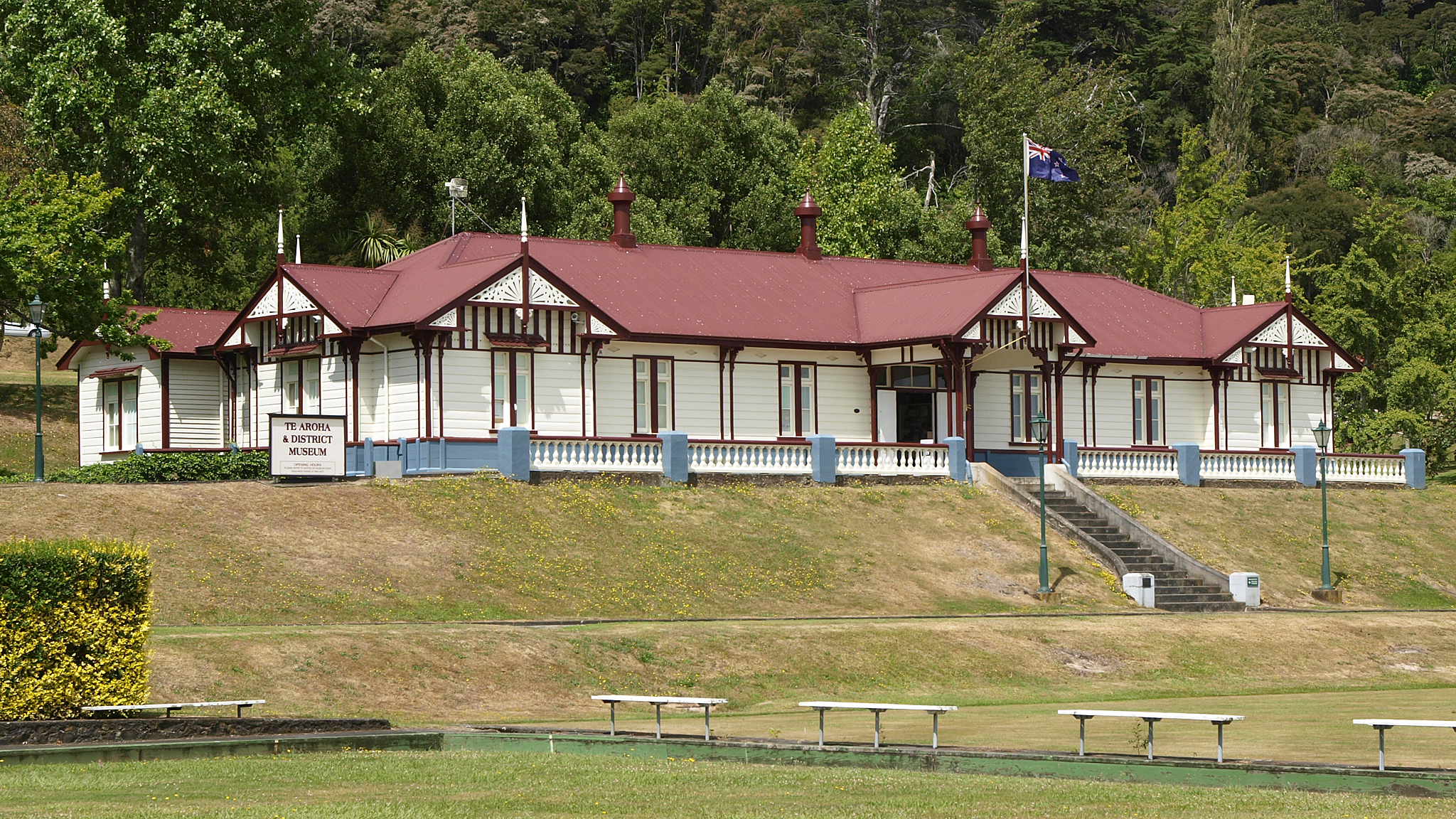
- Cadman Bathhouse in Te Aroha Domain
- Interactive map of Te Aroha
- Coordinates: 37°32′S 175°43′E
- Country: New Zealand
- Region: Waikato
- Territorial authority: Matamata-Piako District
- Ward: Te Aroha General
- Electorates: Waikato; Hauraki-Waikato (Māori)

Government
  - Territorial Authority: Matamata-Piako District Council
  - Regional council: Waikato Regional Council
  - Mayor of Matamata-Piako: Ash Tanner
  - Waikato MP: Tim van de Molen
  - Hauraki-Waikato MP: Hana-Rawhiti Maipi-Clarke

Area
  - Total: 10.96 km^{2} (4.23 sq mi)

Population (June 2025)
  - Total: 4,730
  - Density: 432/km^{2} (1,120/sq mi)
- Postcode(s): 3320

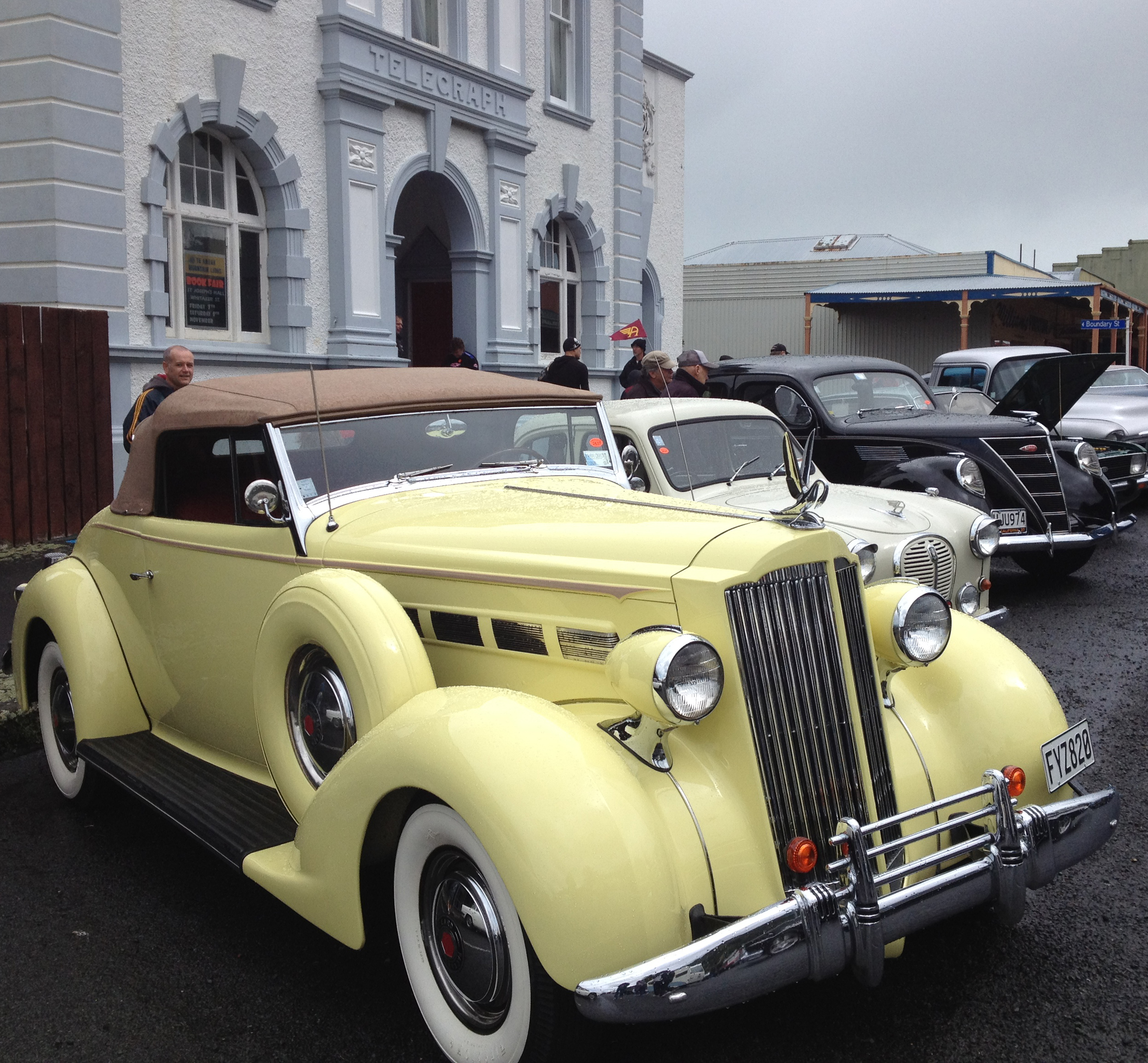
Cruise 2014 Telegraph Building Te Aroha

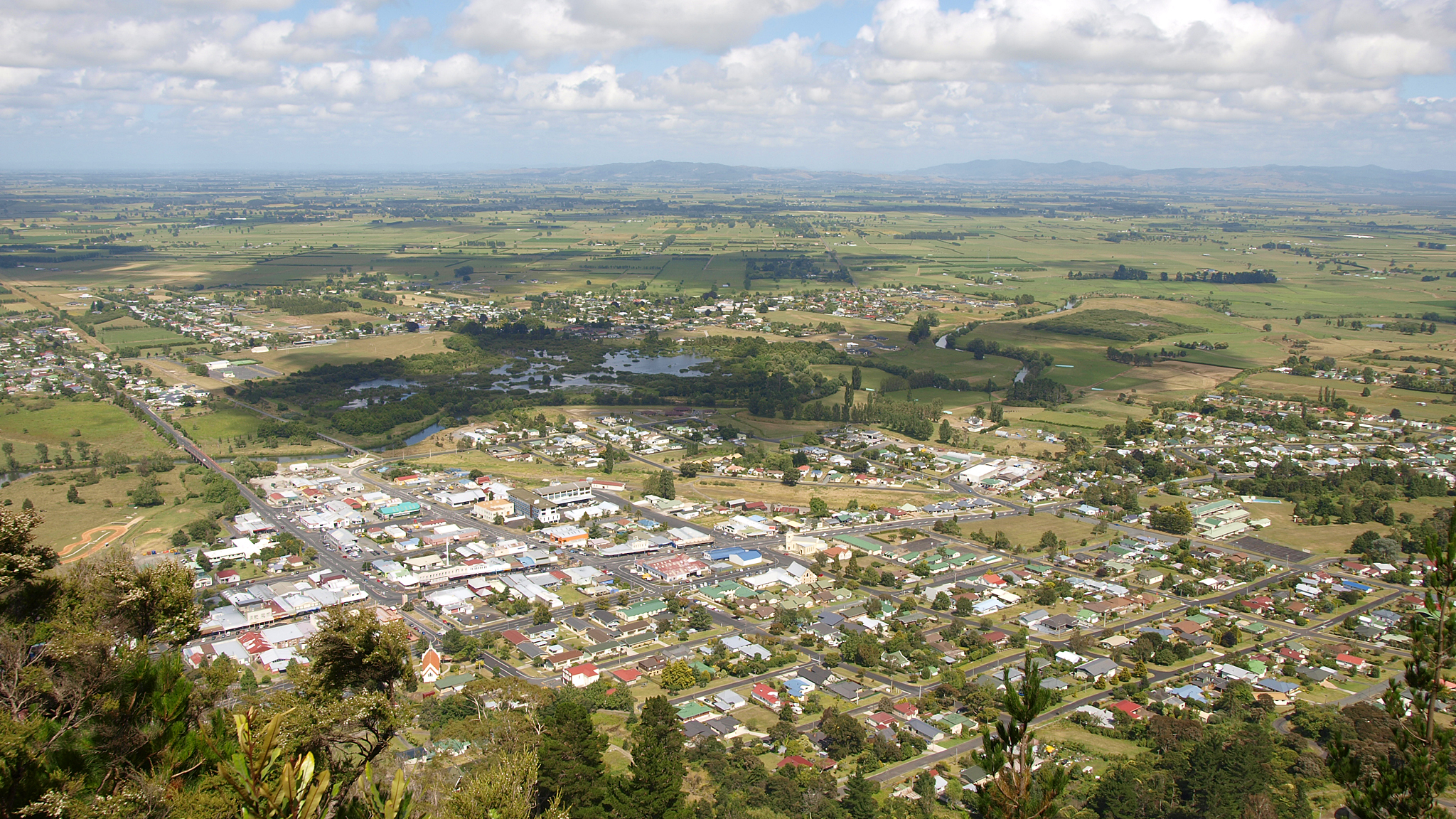
View over the town

Te Aroha is a rural town in the Waikato region of New Zealand with a population of 3,906 people in the 2013 census, an increase of 138 people since 2006. It is 53 km (33 mi) northeast of Hamilton and 50 km (31 mi) south of Thames. It sits at the foot of 952 metres (3,123 ft) Mount Te Aroha, the highest point in the Kaimai Range.

== Etymology ==
The name Te Aroha comes from the eponymous Mount Te Aroha. The name of the mountain is shortened from Te Aroha-a-uta (love flowing inland). This name is accepted as describing a longing for a homeland, with various stories in Māori oral tradition about the naming of the mountain. Originally, the northern area of the town was known as Morgantown after the Māori chief Morgan Hou, whilst the southern part was known as Lipseytown after Hou's daughter Ema Lipsey.

== History ==
In 1879 the Te Aroha Block was surveyed, the 50,000 acres (20,000 ha) block was subdivided into sections of between 50 and 320 acres (20 and 129 ha). George Lipsey was the first European to settle in Te Aroha. Lipsey came from Thames and married the daughter of Morgan Hou, Ema. Morgan was a Maori chief who owned the land that became Te Aroha. The population grew quickly during the 1880s as a result of a gold rush. A spa was founded in 1883 but popularity had declined by the 1930s. In the 1880s farmers from Lincolnshire came to settle the surrounding area which helped with the growth of Te Aroha and the wider Piako County area. A report to Parliament by James McKerrow in 1881 described the town as being in the most favourable spot referencing transport, roads, and farm land surrounding the town.

Te Aroha Borough Council took over from the 1880 Town Board on 2 May 1898. Herriesville became part of Te Aroha Borough Council. The 1938 Council Chambers is now a Category 2 listed building. Matamata-Piako District Council took over under the 1989 local government reforms.

The construction of a railway line led to Te Aroha becoming a popular tourist destination by the late 1890s. People came to Te Aroha for both leisure and health reasons. Te Aroha was compared to famous European spas and hotels popped up to service travellers. Starting in the 20th century the popularity of the baths at Te Aroha declined. Starting in the 1930s the town and baths experienced financial losses which led to the closure of the baths. In 1961 the Cadman Baths closed and the outdoor swimming pool was filled in.

The area around Te Aroha was originally swampland, but it was drained and became productive agricultural land, this led to Te Aroha becoming a service town for the wider rural area. Te Aroha became a town district in 1884, at the time it had a school, post office, police station, and multiple churches.

On 17 February 1985 Te Aroha experienced a severe flash flood that washed boulders, mud, and trees through the town. Most shops and more than 50 homes were damaged, resulting in the death of three people.

=== Gold mining ===
Gold was discovered near Te Aroha on 11 September 1880. On 20 November 1880, the Te Aroha Goldmining District was established under the Goldmining Districts Act 1873. This sparked a gold rush and the town with over 500 miners 5 days after the proclamation. Compared to other gold rushes—such as the one at Ohinemuri 5 years prior—the rush at Te Aroha was described as tame and peaceful. Despite the hype around the discovery of gold it was soon discovered that there was a fault crush and nothing more was found. Miners started moving away as little gold was discovered. Gold was soon discovered in 1883 at Waiorongomai and the remaining miners headed there, although some left their families in Te Aroha.

=== Bridges ===
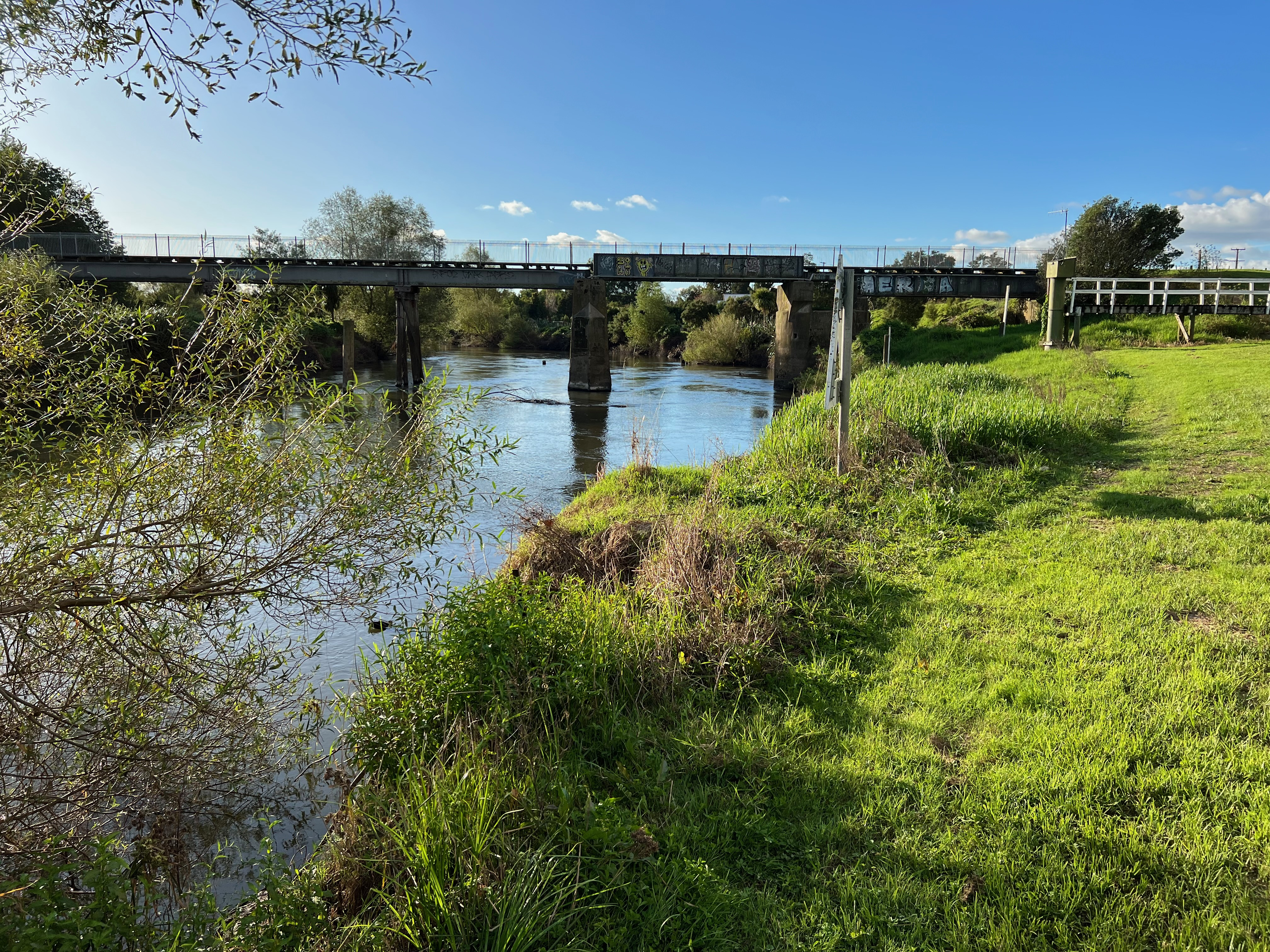
1960s Te Aroha railway bridge

Coulter Bridge, over the Waihou River, on Kenrick St (SH26) was rebuilt in 1910 and the present bridge was built alongside it in 1928. The 1885 railway bridge had an 11 ft (3.4 m) and 9 of 40 ft (12 m) spans, with a swing span at its east end. It was rebuilt in 1912, replacing an 1895 swing bridge. It is now a footbridge, but will not be replaced.

=== Railway stations ===
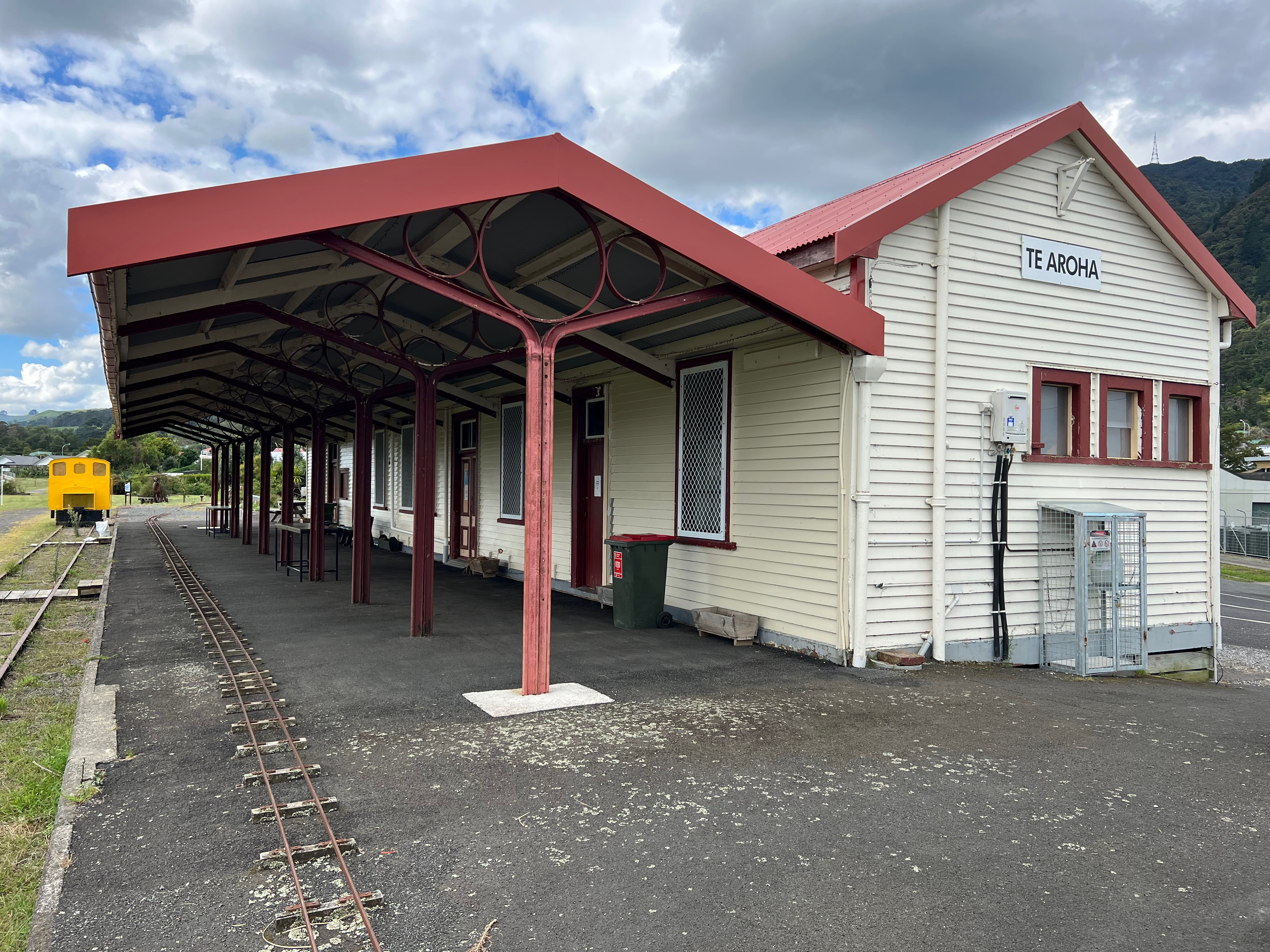
Te Aroha railway station in 2023

The Thames Branch reached Te Aroha in 1885 and the station opened on 1 March 1886, when it had a partly built 4th class station (completed in June 1886 by W Cameron for about £2,750, with some buildings probably also moved from Eureka to Te Aroha), platform, cart approach, 40 ft (12 m) x 30 ft (9.1 m) goods shed (extended in 1942), loading bank, engine shed, stationmaster's house, urinals and a passing loop for 48 wagons. Te Aroha remained a terminus until the line to Paeroa opened on 20 December 1895. Cattle yards were added later in 1886, a coffee stall in 1896 and more improvements in 1897. The station was described in 1902 as: "of wood, and include a ladies' waiting room, a public waiting room, a vestibule, stationmaster's office, ticket office, and parcels office. There is a long asphalted platform."

The area west of the Waihou was named Herriesville from 1914, when a private railway siding was opened on 24 January 1914 to serve the A&P ground. William Herries had been a local landowner. Seven railway cottages were built in 1924. Both stations closed to passengers on 11 September 1967 and to freight on 11 July 1986, though Herriesville was only open for racecourse traffic.

Preceding station	Historical railways	Following station
Waihou; Line closed, station closed 4.8 km (3.0 mi)	Thames Branch; New Zealand Railways Department	Tui Pa; Line closed, station closed 2.49 km (1.55 mi)

== Demographics ==
In 1886 Te Aroha riding (which includes rural land far from the town) had a population of 1,203, by 1891 this had decreased to 1016, with 615 in the town district and the rest in the outlying areas. In 1898, when Te Aroha was constituted as a borough, it covered approximately 1,000 acres (400 ha), 200 dwellings, and 600 residents. In 1915 Te Aroha had a population of 1,500, in 1928 it was 2,920. In 1972 Te Aroha Borough Council had a population of 3,220.

Te Aroha covers 10.96 km^{2} (4.23 sq mi) and had an estimated population of 4,730 as of June 2025, with a population density of 432 people per km^{2}.

Historical population
Year	Pop.	±% p.a.
2006	3,810	—
2013	4,002	+0.70%
2018	4,551	+2.60%
2023	4,650	+0.43%

Te Aroha had a population of 4,650 in the 2023 New Zealand census, an increase of 99 people (2.2%) since the 2018 census, and an increase of 648 people (16.2%) since the 2013 census. There were 2,280 males, 2,361 females and 12 people of other genders in 1,893 dwellings. 2.2% of people identified as LGBTIQ+. The median age was 49.8 years (compared with 38.1 years nationally). There were 804 people (17.3%) aged under 15 years, 576 (12.4%) aged 15 to 29, 1,905 (41.0%) aged 30 to 64, and 1,362 (29.3%) aged 65 or older.

People could identify as more than one ethnicity. The results were 82.5% European (Pākehā); 19.8% Māori; 5.0% Pasifika; 7.5% Asian; 0.6% Middle Eastern, Latin American and African New Zealanders (MELAA); and 2.3% other, which includes people giving their ethnicity as "New Zealander". English was spoken by 97.4%, Māori language by 2.8%, Samoan by 0.4%, and other languages by 8.6%. No language could be spoken by 1.4% (e.g. too young to talk). New Zealand Sign Language was known by 0.5%. The percentage of people born overseas was 18.0, compared with 28.8% nationally.

Religious affiliations were 31.3% Christian, 1.0% Hindu, 0.3% Islam, 0.8% Māori religious beliefs, 1.6% Buddhist, 0.6% New Age, 0.1% Jewish, and 1.5% other religions. People who answered that they had no religion were 54.2%, and 8.7% of people did not answer the census question.

Of those at least 15 years old, 489 (12.7%) people had a bachelor's or higher degree, 2,031 (52.8%) had a post-high school certificate or diploma, and 1,332 (34.6%) people exclusively held high school qualifications. The median income was $31,400, compared with $41,500 nationally. 255 people (6.6%) earned over $100,000 compared to 12.1% nationally. The employment status of those at least 15 was that 1,590 (41.3%) people were employed full-time, 492 (12.8%) were part-time, and 93 (2.4%) were unemployed.

Individual statistical areas
Name	Area (km^{2})	Population	Density (per km^{2})	Dwellings	Median age	Median income
Te Aroha East	4.68	2,589	553	1,116	49.2 years	$31,000
Te Aroha West	6.28	2,064	329	777	50.6 years	$31,800
New Zealand					38.1 years	$41,500

== Geography ==
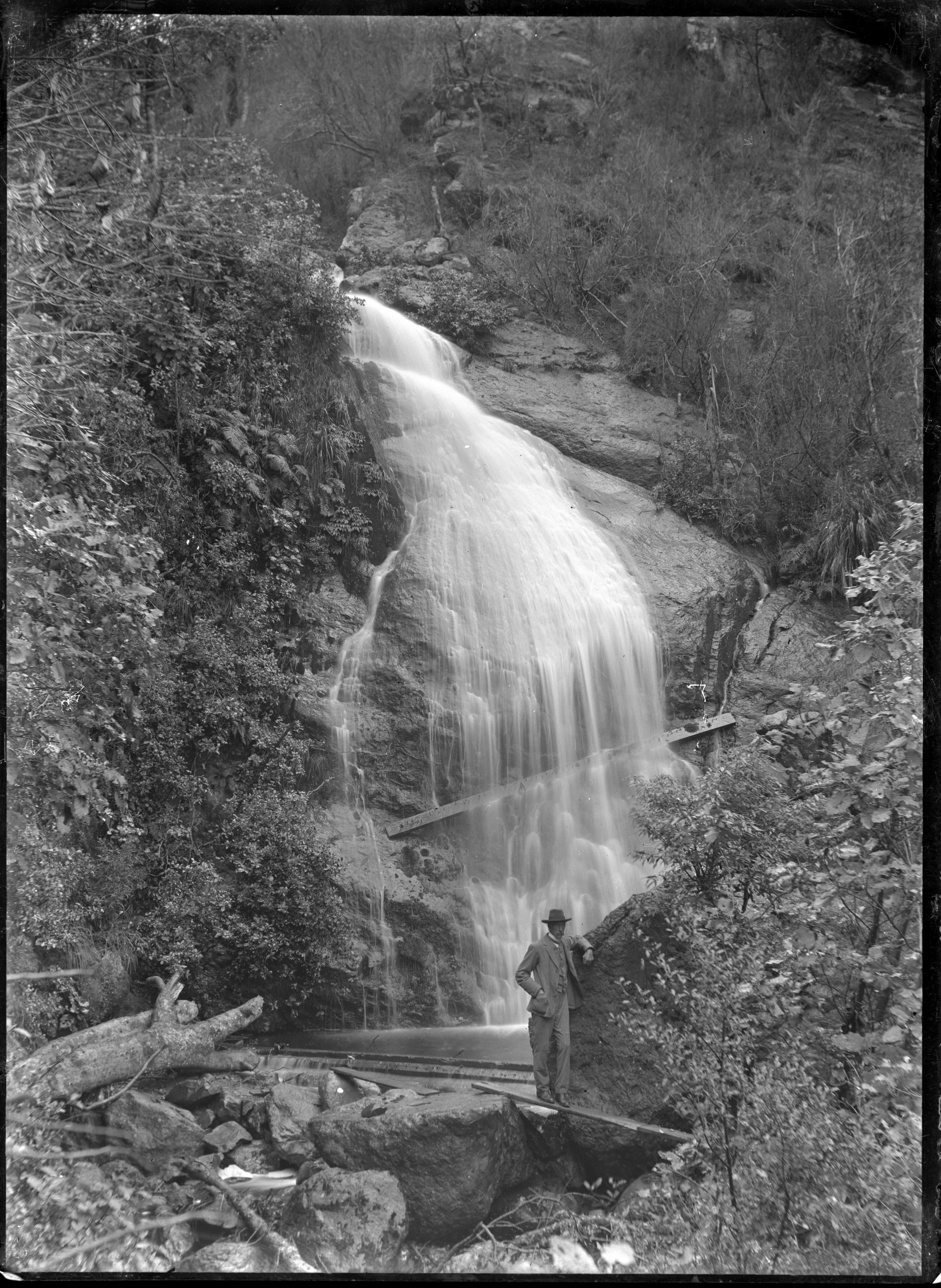
Waterfall at Te Aroha

=== Mount Te Aroha ===
The eponymous Mount Te Aroha is the highest peak of the Kaimais at 953 m (3,127 ft) and dominates the landscape. A road leads up to the summit. The road began construction 1963 so a television repeater station could be installed at the top of the summit. The station serves the Waikato and Bay of Plenty areas.

=== Hot springs ===
Thermal and mineral springs are both found close to the centre of the town. The springs have been used by the Māori for many years before becoming popular in the 1870s with European settlers. The New Zealand Herald writes that the site was gifted to New Zealand by chief Mokena Hou in the 1880s. The hot spring water emerges from the source at a range of 75 °C /167 °F to 85 °C / 185 °F, and is cooled before reaching the soaking pools. Te Aroha has a hot soda-water geyser, which is the only one of its kind in the Southern Hemisphere.

=== Climate ===
Climate data for Te Aroha, 18 m (59 ft), (1971–2000 normals, extremes 1888–1999)
Month	Jan	Feb	Mar	Apr	May	Jun	Jul	Aug	Sep	Oct	Nov	Dec	Year
Record high °C (°F)	35.0 (95.0)	34.4 (93.9)	31.1 (88.0)	27.8 (82.0)	24.4 (75.9)	21.7 (71.1)	20.9 (69.6)	22.2 (72.0)	25.0 (77.0)	29.4 (84.9)	32.5 (90.5)	33.3 (91.9)	35.0 (95.0)
Mean maximum °C (°F)	29.3 (84.7)	29.2 (84.6)	27.1 (80.8)	24.3 (75.7)	21.0 (69.8)	18.9 (66.0)	17.7 (63.9)	18.4 (65.1)	20.4 (68.7)	22.5 (72.5)	25.0 (77.0)	27.4 (81.3)	30.2 (86.4)
Mean daily maximum °C (°F)	25.2 (77.4)	25.5 (77.9)	23.6 (74.5)	20.6 (69.1)	17.4 (63.3)	15.0 (59.0)	14.4 (57.9)	15.2 (59.4)	17.0 (62.6)	18.8 (65.8)	20.9 (69.6)	23.2 (73.8)	19.7 (67.5)
Daily mean °C (°F)	19.9 (67.8)	20.1 (68.2)	18.4 (65.1)	15.6 (60.1)	12.7 (54.9)	10.6 (51.1)	10.0 (50.0)	10.8 (51.4)	12.5 (54.5)	14.5 (58.1)	16.3 (61.3)	18.4 (65.1)	15.0 (59.0)
Mean daily minimum °C (°F)	14.7 (58.5)	14.8 (58.6)	13.2 (55.8)	10.5 (50.9)	8.0 (46.4)	6.2 (43.2)	5.5 (41.9)	6.5 (43.7)	8.1 (46.6)	10.2 (50.4)	11.8 (53.2)	13.6 (56.5)	10.3 (50.5)
Mean minimum °C (°F)	8.8 (47.8)	8.8 (47.8)	5.9 (42.6)	3.4 (38.1)	0.4 (32.7)	−1.1 (30.0)	−1.7 (28.9)	−0.2 (31.6)	1.8 (35.2)	3.5 (38.3)	5.2 (41.4)	7.8 (46.0)	−2.3 (27.9)
Record low °C (°F)	2.2 (36.0)	2.2 (36.0)	0 (32)	−2.2 (28.0)	−4.4 (24.1)	−5.6 (21.9)	−4.6 (23.7)	−6.1 (21.0)	−2.8 (27.0)	−1.1 (30.0)	−1.1 (30.0)	0.0 (32.0)	−6.1 (21.0)
Average rainfall mm (inches)	80.4 (3.17)	99.5 (3.92)	117.9 (4.64)	127.8 (5.03)	107.3 (4.22)	150.0 (5.91)	159.5 (6.28)	145.3 (5.72)	141.9 (5.59)	115.0 (4.53)	102.7 (4.04)	109.3 (4.30)	1,456.6 (57.35)
Source: NIWA

Climate data for Mount Te Aroha Summit, 951 m (3,120 ft), (1951-1980 normals, extremes 1966-1989)
Month	Jan	Feb	Mar	Apr	May	Jun	Jul	Aug	Sep	Oct	Nov	Dec	Year
Record high °C (°F)	25 (77)	26 (79)	22 (72)	20.6 (69.1)	15 (59)	14.2 (57.6)	11.7 (53.1)	14.4 (57.9)	15 (59)	17 (63)	20.6 (69.1)	21.1 (70.0)	26 (79)
Mean daily maximum °C (°F)	16.9 (62.4)	17 (63)	15.3 (59.5)	12.2 (54.0)	9.3 (48.7)	7.5 (45.5)	6.3 (43.3)	7.4 (45.3)	8.7 (47.7)	10.6 (51.1)	13.2 (55.8)	15.3 (59.5)	11.6 (53.0)
Daily mean °C (°F)	12.9 (55.2)	13.5 (56.3)	12 (54)	9.1 (48.4)	6.7 (44.1)	5.2 (41.4)	4 (39)	4.6 (40.3)	5.7 (42.3)	7.5 (45.5)	9.6 (49.3)	11.3 (52.3)	8.5 (47.3)
Mean daily minimum °C (°F)	8.9 (48.0)	10 (50)	8.7 (47.7)	6 (43)	4 (39)	2.9 (37.2)	1.7 (35.1)	1.8 (35.2)	2.6 (36.7)	4.4 (39.9)	6 (43)	7.3 (45.1)	5.4 (41.7)
Record low °C (°F)	1.7 (35.1)	2 (36)	−1.1 (30.0)	−2.8 (27.0)	−3.9 (25.0)	−6 (21)	−6.7 (19.9)	−6.7 (19.9)	−8.3 (17.1)	−5 (23)	−0.6 (30.9)	−1.7 (28.9)	−8.3 (17.1)
Average rainfall mm (inches)	116 (4.6)	138 (5.4)	188 (7.4)	179 (7.0)	172 (6.8)	215 (8.5)	184 (7.2)	248 (9.8)	198 (7.8)	177 (7.0)	136 (5.4)	143 (5.6)	2,094 (82.5)
Source: NIWA

== Economy ==
Te Aroha is at the centre of a dairy farming community and much of its economic activity is in serving that community. Tourism is increasing in Te Aroha. The mineral baths are a very popular spot for tourists and locals alike.

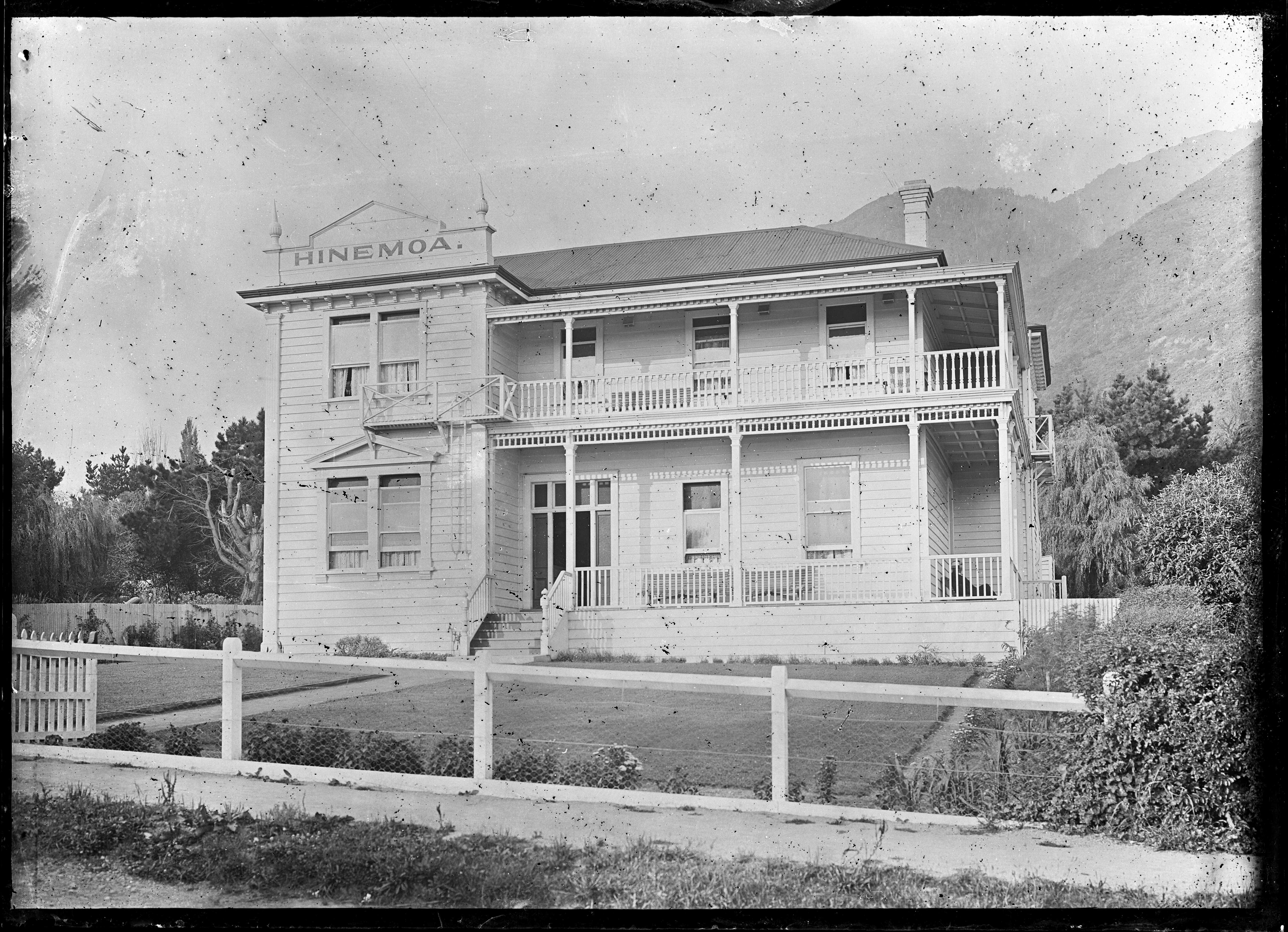
Hinemoa Hotel circa 1916

Historically mining played a role in the area, some mines had have had a long impact, such as toxic residues leaking from the abandoned Tui mine tailings dam.

== Notable places ==
The Mokena Hou Geyser, the only natural soda water geyser in the world is located on the lower slopes of Mount Te Aroha. The geyser is named after Morgan (Mokena) Hou. It is used to make the drink Lemon & Te Aroha, which has been produced on and off since 1888. The geyser complex, the most intact Edwardian spa in New Zealand, is located in the Te Aroha Domain.

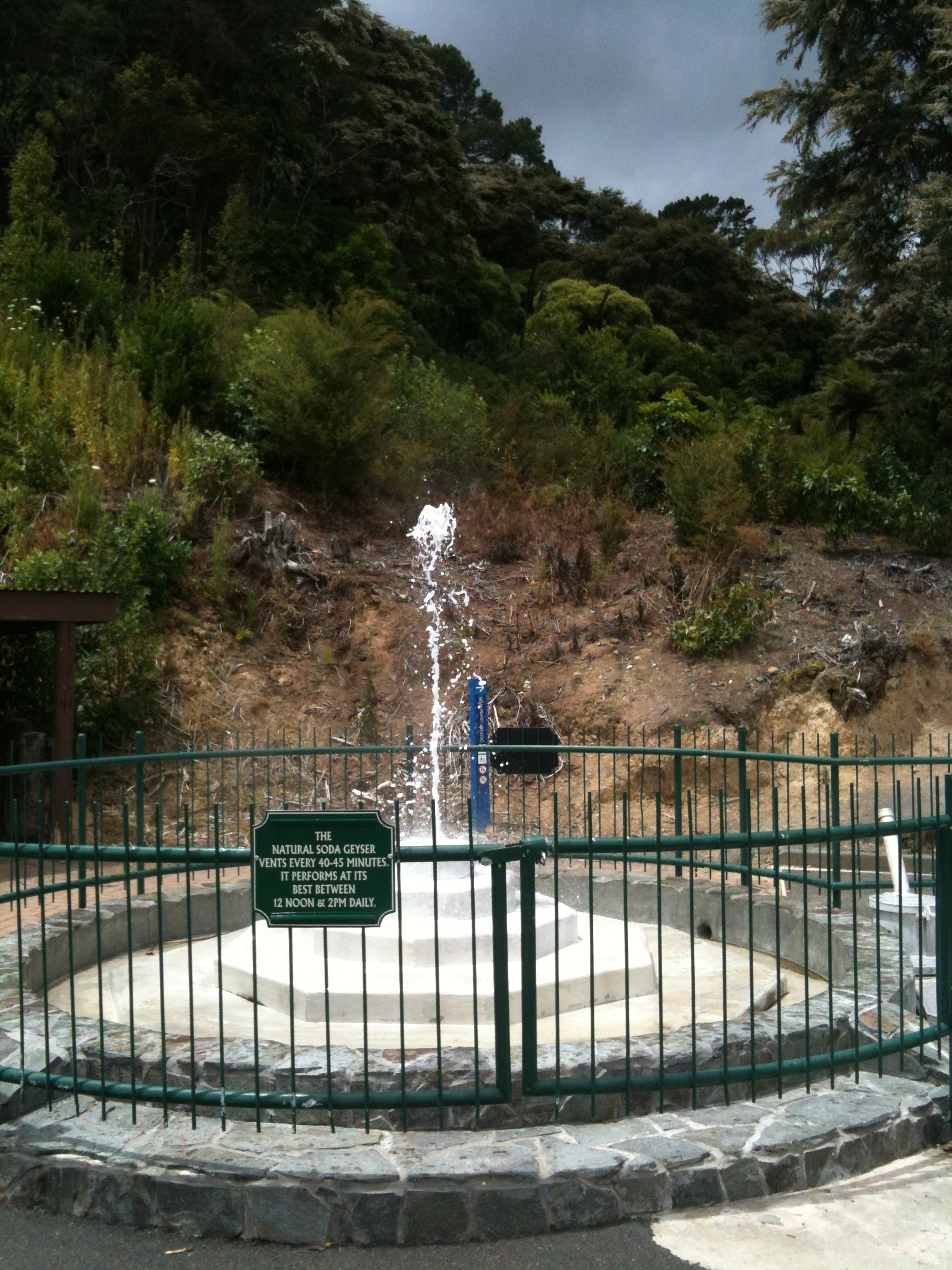
Mokena Hou Geyser erupting.

The category 1 Grand Tavern was constructed as a hotel between 1880 and 1881 during the local gold rush. The hotel was one of several in Te Aroha that serviced travellers coming for the hot springs. The Grand Tavern is a grand Victorian two-storeyed building and a rare example of an extant Victorian hotel in New Zealand.

=== Te Aroha Domain ===
The Te Aroha Domain is registered as a historic area. It housed the original baths used to attract tourists the town. Today the domain still retains many of the original Edwardian buildings and serves as an attraction for tourists. Included amongst the domain's Edwardian buildings is the category 1 Cadman Bathhouse, the largest and most ornate of the domain's buildings.

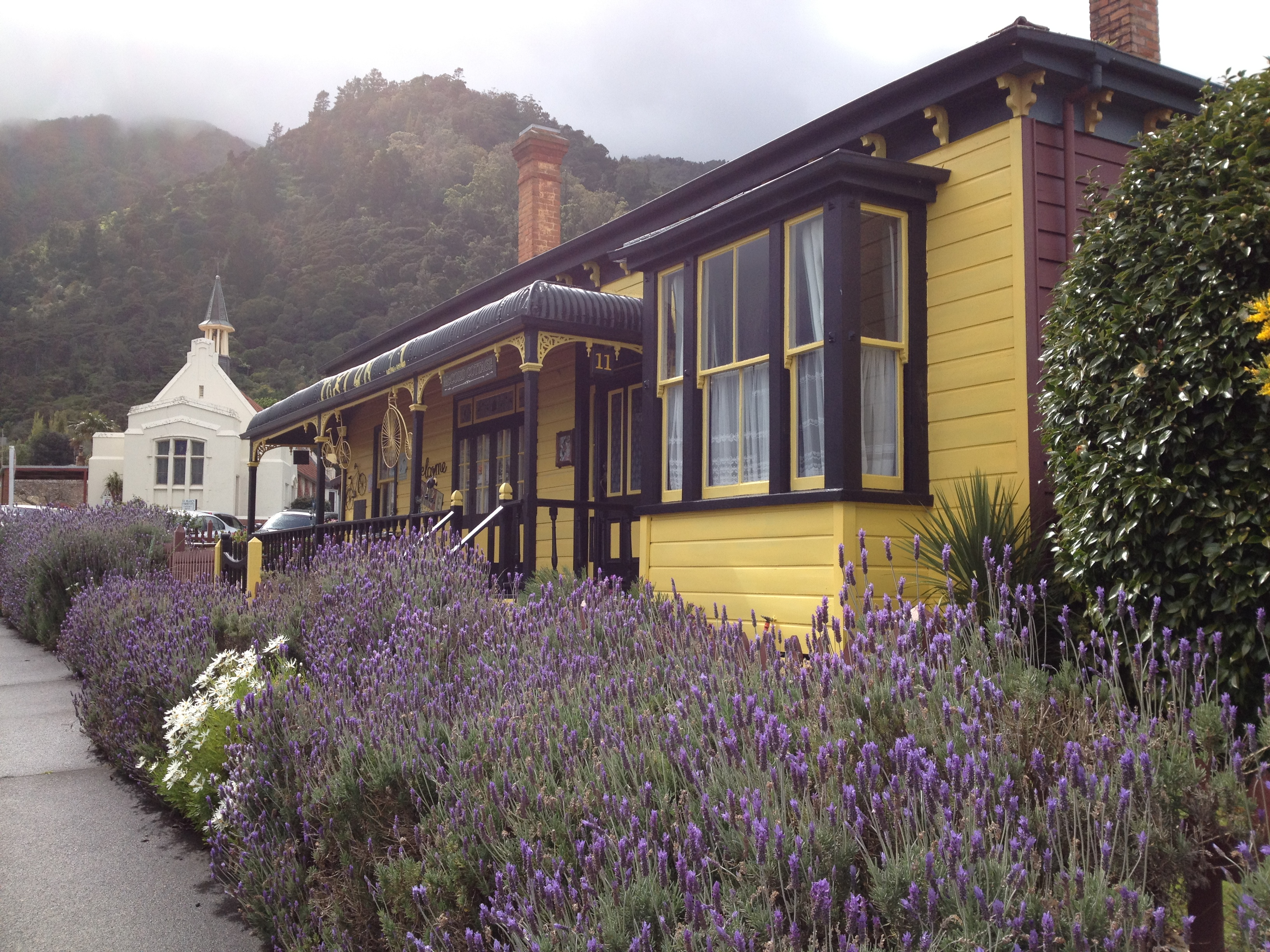
Miner's cottage with lavender border opposite St Mark's Church, Te Aroha, New Zealand

== Events ==
- Waihou and Te Aroha Cobras play an annual rugby match for the Dr Dunn memorial trophy. This is one of the biggest days on the calendar of Te Aroha.
- A Day in the Domain was started in Te Aroha in 1977 by the Arts Council and continues to be a fun, affordable day out. The day attracts artists and performers from far and wide with a variety of stalls and foodies on display. Entertainment is free with competitions and games all day.
- The King and Queen of the Mountain and Bald Spur Derby have been annual events in Te Aroha since the 1950s. Held the weekend before Christmas, the challenge is to be the first man or woman up Mount Te Aroha and back down again. This has been achieved in under one hour. The Bald Spur Derby offers competitors a shorter but still challenging course.
- Te Aroha AP & H Show has been running since the 1890s. Boasting one of the most extensive home industries sections, it has full agricultural and equestrian sections and the usual country fair activities such as the gumboot throwing competition and cattle dogs.

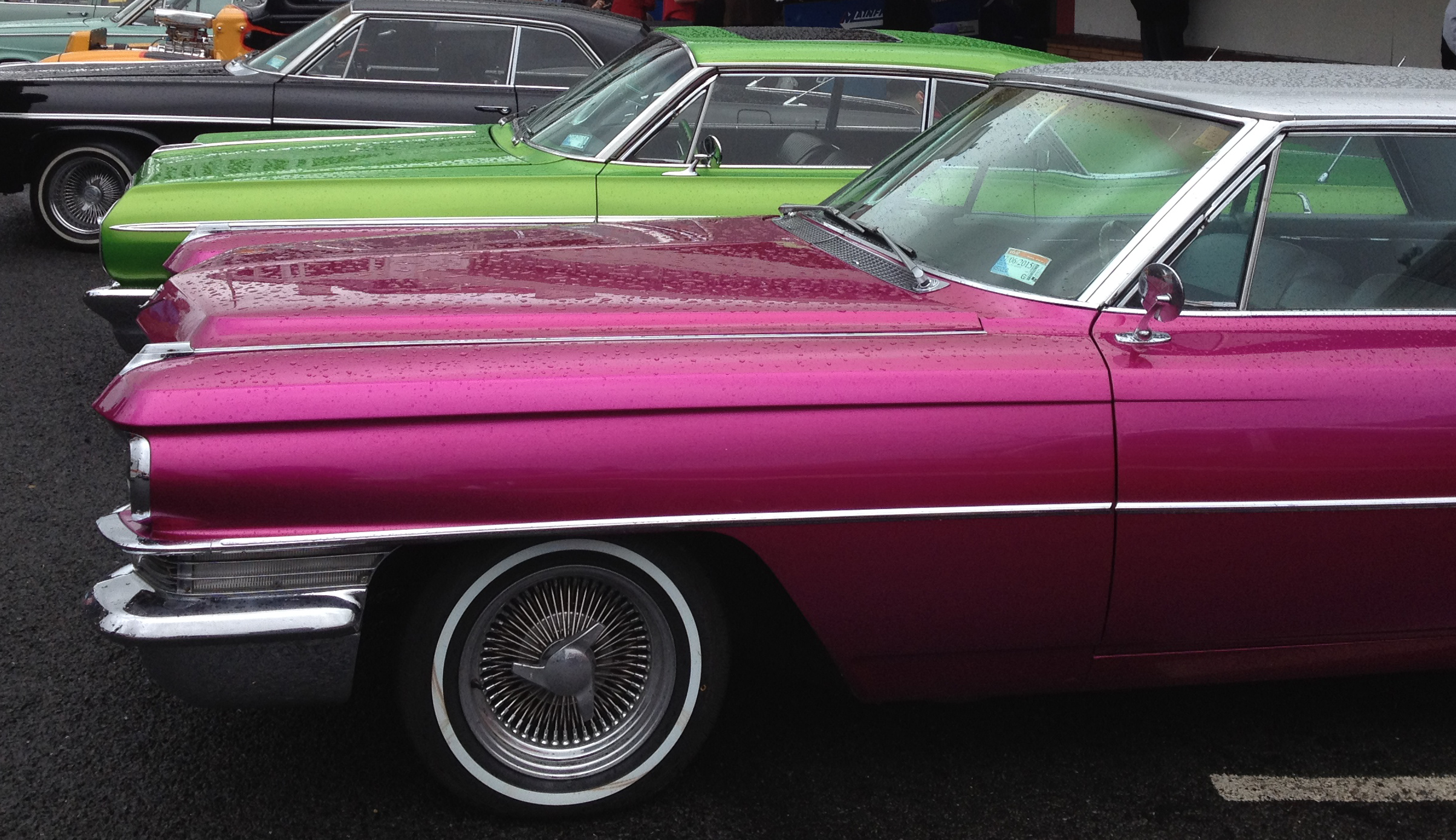
Te Aroha Cruise 2014

- Te Aroha Cruise In (car event) started 2008.

== Education ==
Te Aroha College is the town's state secondary school, with a roll of 401. It started with a year 9 class at Te Aroha School in 1907 and became a secondary department of the school in 1908. In 1957, it became Te Aroha College, and it moved to its current site in 1958.

There are two state primary schools in the town: Te Aroha Primary School, with a roll of 222; and Stanley Avenue School, with a roll of 268. Te Aroha Primary opened as Te Aroha Goldfields School in 1881, and became Te Aroha District High School until Te Aroha College moved to its own site. Stanley Avenue School held a 25th reunion in 1991.

St Joseph's Catholic School is a state integrated Catholic school, with a roll of 62. It started in 1903, and expanded into new premises in 1908 and 1927.

All these schools are co-educational. Rolls are as of July 2026.

Te Aroha West Public School opened in 1883 and closed in 2000.

== Notable people ==
- Morgan (Mokena) Hou, a Maori chief who was a well respected friend of the European settlers and owned the land that became Te Aroha. The northern part of Te Aroha was originally named after him and the Mokena Hou geyser is named in his honour.
- Olympic Gold Medalist Peter Snell
- All Black Kevin 'Herb' Schuler
- Robert Coulter, Mayor of Te Aroha and Labour MP
- Don Beard, New Zealand cricketer and principal of Te Aroha College from 1961 to 1982
- Todd Muller, Member of Parliament for Bay of Plenty.
- Ross Ardern, Administrator of Tokelau from 2018-2022

== Fauna and flora ==
In 2020 a report was produced on the moths of Mount Te Aroha outlining important species that inhabit the area.

== Filmography ==
Te Aroha was the setting of the 2023 crime drama The Gone (renamed Mt Affinity in the show).
