= Baffle =

Baffle or baffles may refer to:

- Slosh baffle, auxiliary devices employed in tank which suppress the effects of slosh dynamics
- Baffle (heat transfer), a flow-directing or obstructing vane or panel used in some industrial process vessels (tanks)
- Baffle (medicine), a tunnel or wall surgically constructed within the heart or primary blood vessels to redirect blood flow
- Baffles (submarine), the blind spot in a submarine's sonar created by the body of the submarine
- Baffle or All-Star Baffle, a 1973–74 revival of PDQ (game show), where contestants had to guess phrases from a short combination of letters
- Baffle gate, another name for turnstile
- Optical baffle, shroud protecting the optics of an imaging system from being disturbed from stray light
- Sound baffle, any object designed to reduce airborne sound
  - Components in a loudspeaker enclosure used to negate the out-of-phase sound waves from the rear of the loudspeaker
  - Components in a suppressor used to redirect the gas from a gunshot to minimise sound and light
- Baffle blocks are used in flowing water to reduce its force
