= Bill Richardson Transport World =

Transport museum in Invercargill, New Zealand

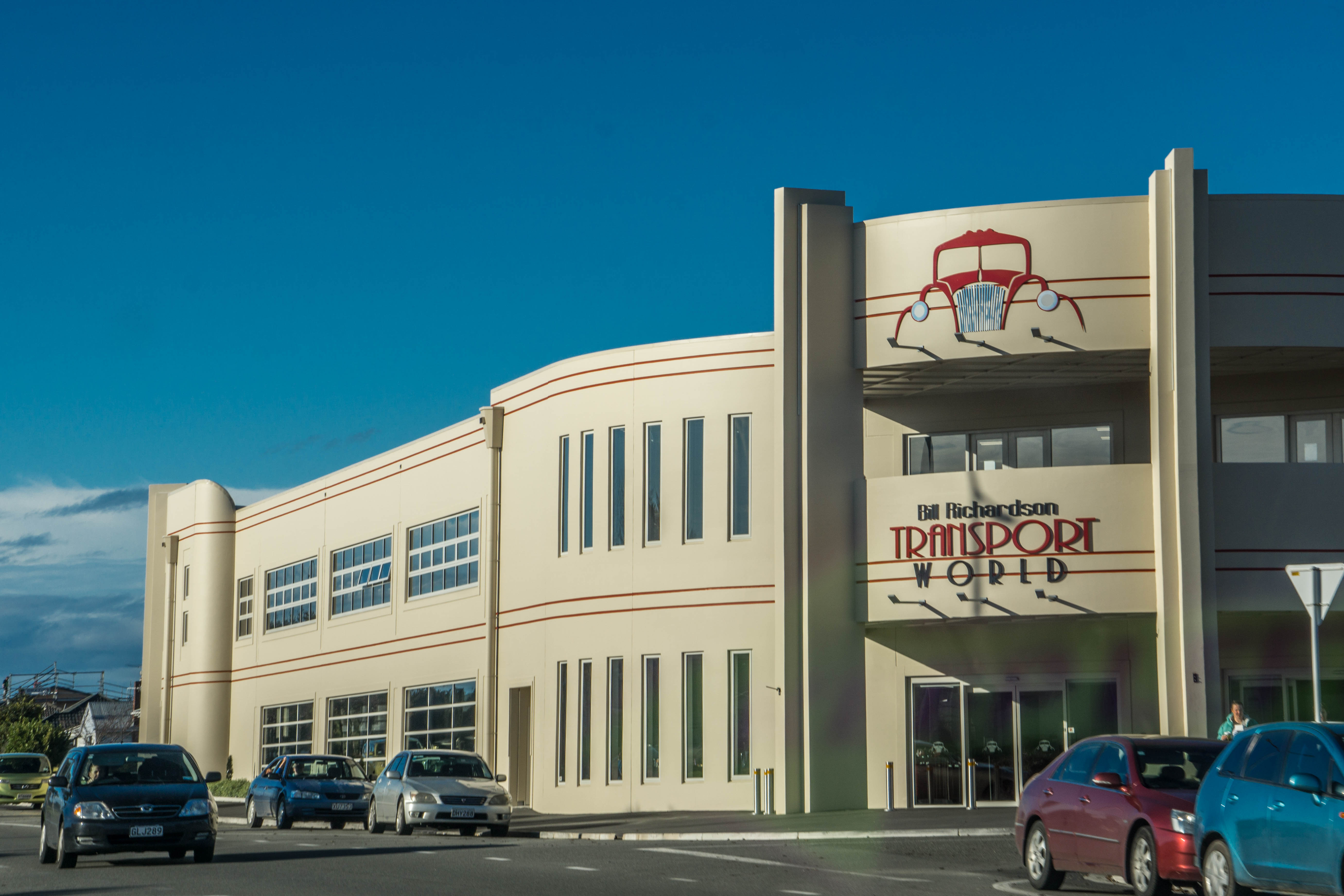
- Viewed from corner of Tay and Inglewood St
- Established: November 2015; 10 years ago
- Location: 491 Tay Street; Invercargill; New Zealand
- Coordinates: 46.40955°S 168.380442°E
- Type: Transport museum
- Collections: Vehicles, machinery, petrol pumps, transport memorabilia, wearable art, social history
- Collection size: Over 300 vehicles
- Founder: Jocelyn O'Donnell
- Owner: Transport World
- Website: transportworld.co.nz

Bill Richardson Transport World is a transport museum in Invercargill in Southland, New Zealand. The museum is a 15,000 square metres (160,000 sq ft) complex of vehicles and transport-related objects. A highlight of the display is a rare 1940 Dodge Airflow truck. Bill Richardson Transport World also displays wearable arts and social history objects. It also has a construction zone for children, a library with a focus on transport and manuals, and an events and conference centre. The facility includes a restaurant, The Grille Café. The museum is operated as a tourism venture by Transport World, an Invercargill-based business.

== History ==
Bill Richardson, a Southland businessman, had a transport company called Southern Transport as his first business. Under his guidance, it grew into the HWR Group. When he bought trucks for the business, he had to concede that sometimes he, in his words, "bought a truck more with our hearts than with our heads." Transport World's collection began in 1967 when Bill Richardson began collecting old trucks, which by the time of his death in 2005 had grown to 150 vehicles including both trucks and farm vehicles. He also collected petrol pumps and other transport-related memorabilia, such as signs and toy models.

Richardson's daughter Jocelyn and her husband Scott O'Donnell decided to open up the collection to the public. Building consent was granted in December 2014 for a 5,333 m^{2} (57,400 sq ft) building on the Tay Street site to house the collection. The design featured art deco styling, to fit in with other buildings in the area. A new extension was built and in November 2015 Bill Richardson Transport World was opened.

== Collections ==
Bill and his family collected many rare and unusual vehicles, along with popular classic vehicles. The collection spans from a 1904 Ford Ac car to a 2016 Dub Box caravan.

Collections focus on:

- American pre and post-war trucks
- British post-war trucks
- Kombi vans
- Pre-Model T Ford cars
- Ford V8 cars
- Classic and modern race cars
- HWR company trucks
- Agricultural tractors and machinery

=== Vehicle highlights ===
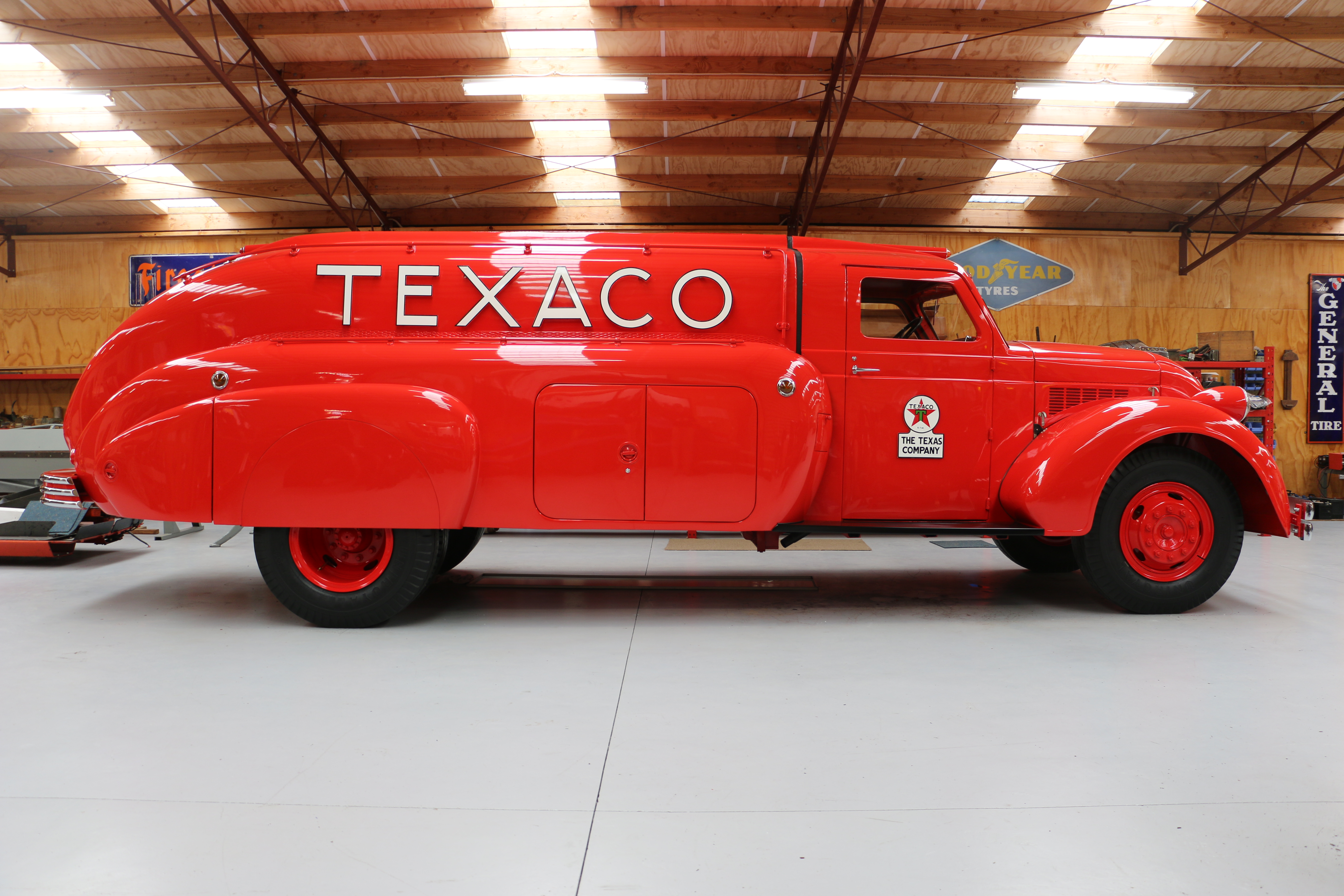
1940 Dodge RX70 Airflow Texaco Tanker

Most of the vehicles in Bill Richardson Transport World are rare, unusual or significant. Highlights include:

- A 1940 Dodge RX70 Airflow truck: This is one of only several hundred made and one of only three known to be restored in the world.
- 1914 Stewart 1 ton truck: This truck was built by the Stewart Iron Works of Cincinnati, Ohio, USA who made trucks from 1912 to 1916. This is the only truck of this make believed to exist.
- 1932 Mack BG: the first truck to use the Mack Bulldog mascot. 2904 units of this model were made.
- 1907 Ford Model K car
- 1924 Gotfredson 20B truck
- 1936 Maple Leaf HY: Unusual make, a Chevrolet made in Canada with a Maple Leaf badge on it.
- 1962 Kenworth Log Skidder
- 1974 Begg 018 Formula 5000

=== Exhibitions ===
The following exhibitions are on display at Bill Richardson Transport World:

- Pork Pie Corner: an exhibit displaying extra footage from the 2017 Pork Pie movie and real movie props, including the 2016 Mini Cooper S used during filming in Invercargill.
- Richardson Family story: It tells the story of the Richardson family from when they first came to New Zealand several generations ago to the present day. It also tells the story of life in early New Zealand and Southland business.
- Ford exhibition: exhibit about the Ford Motor Company and Henry Ford.
- Mobil exhibition: tells the story of Mobil's history, from its beginnings as Standard Oil to its present structure as ExxonMobil. This is included in Transport World because HWR is the New Zealand distributor for Mobil.
- Wearable Art: gallery showcasing wearable art pieces from FibreOctave, an Invercargill event.
- A collection of around 1,500 McDonald's Happy Meal toys.

=== Interactive elements ===
Bill Richardson Transport World has several interactive elements to its attraction:

- Construction Zone: children's room full of Lego and tablets with educational games.
- Pork Pie Police car: a real decommissioned police car used during the filming of Pork Pie. One of the only decommissioned police cars with accessories still attached.
- Replica Goodbye Pork Pie 1978 British Leyland Mini 1000 car: has been reconstructed as it appeared at the end of the movie, with many parts missing.
- Jail Scene: 1925 Ford TT Replica Paddy Wagon and mock jail set with dress ups for children. People can access the back to recreate what it was like for a prisoner.
- Majestic Theatre: a replica of Invercargill's Majestic Theatre that plays old movies.
