= Flame holder =

Engine part

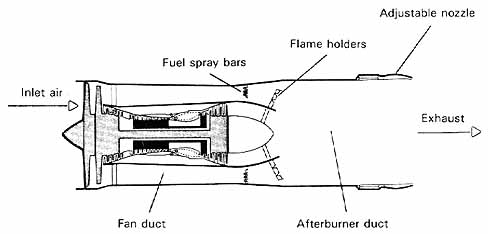

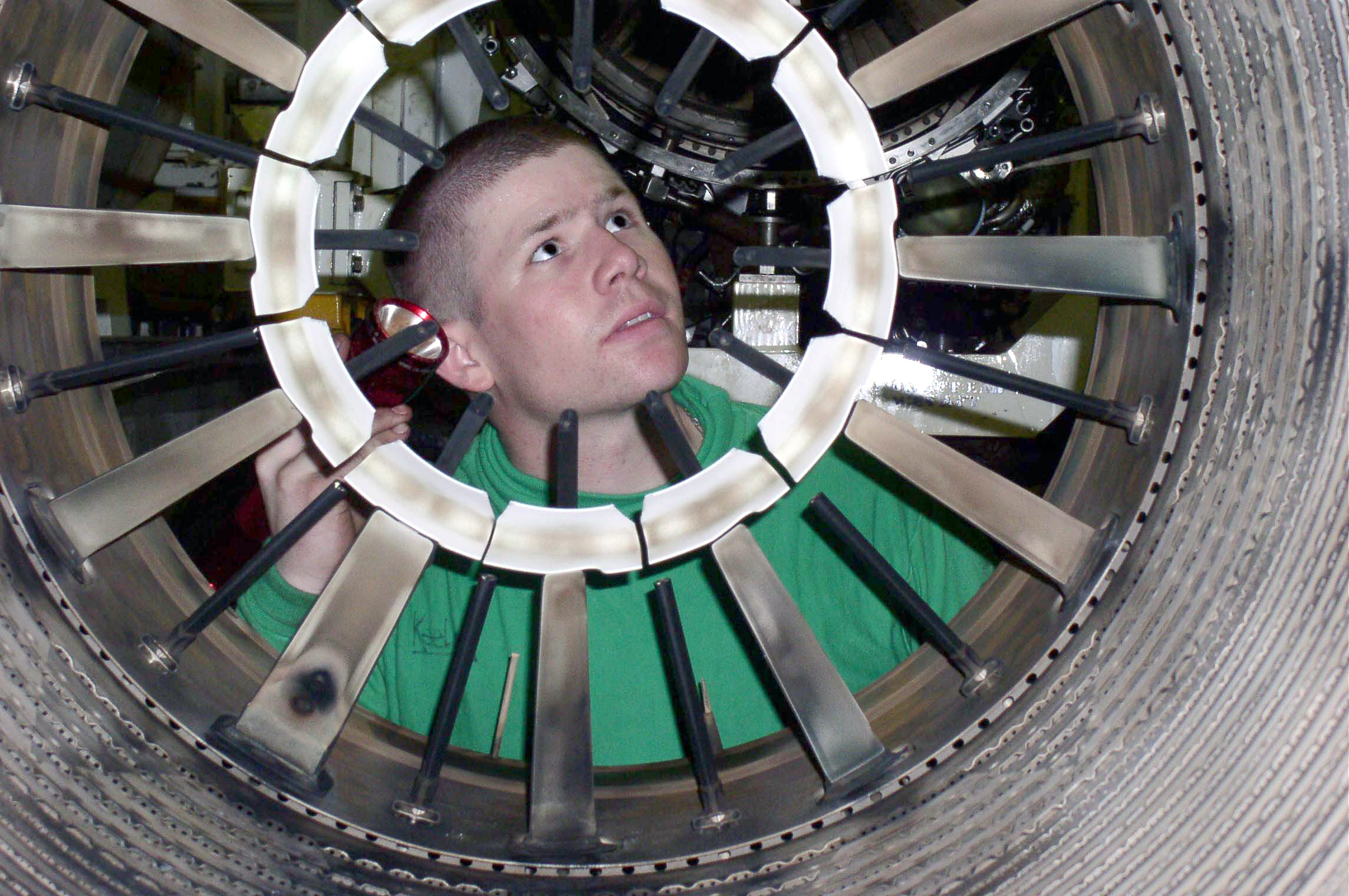

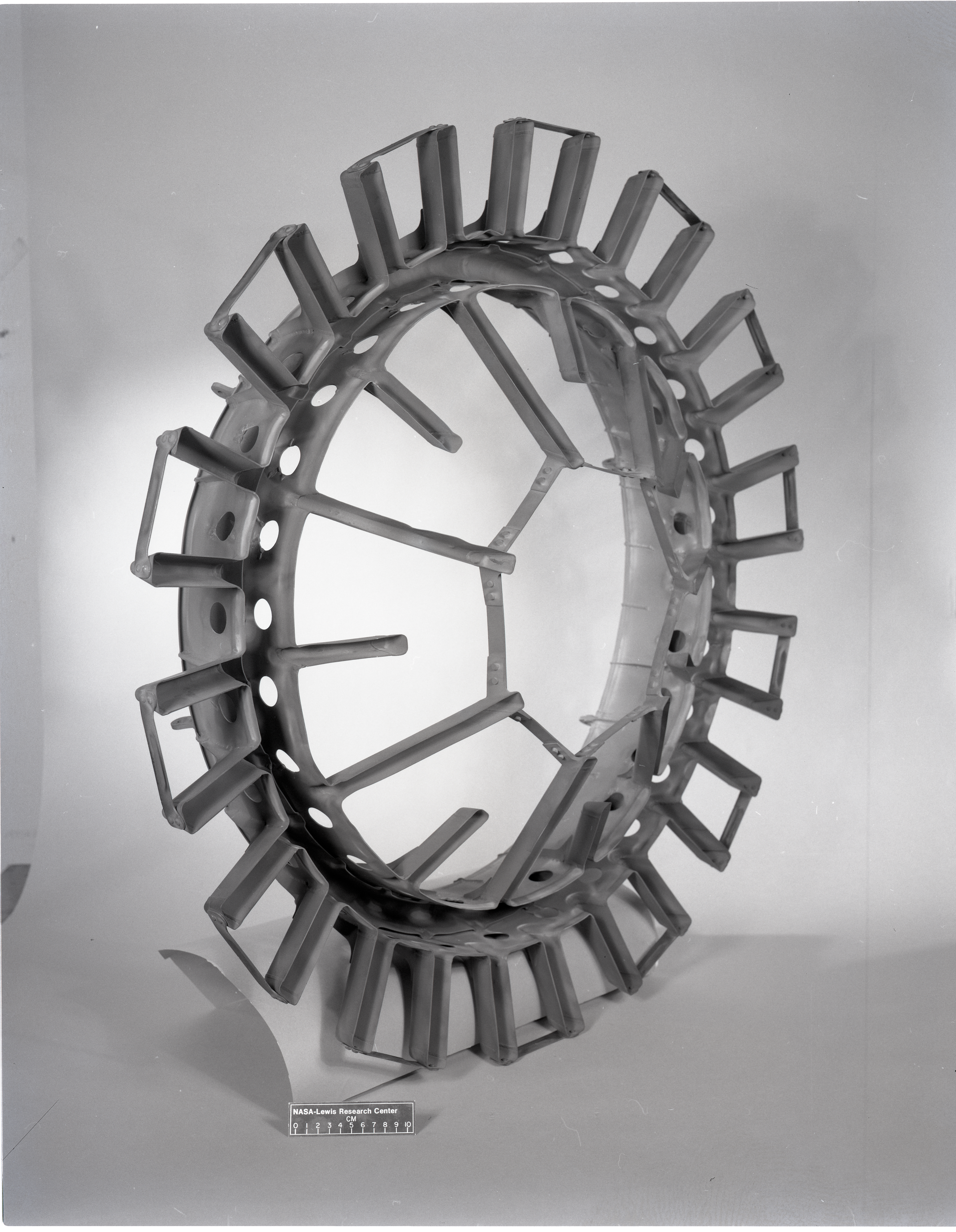

A flame holder is a specialized baffle mounted in a high-velocity combustible flow, such as within the combustion section of a jet engine, to create a local region of turbulence and low velocity in which a flame can remain stable.

Jet engine afterburners and ramjets require a flame holder.

The simplest design, often used in amateur projects, is the can-type flame holder, which consists of a can covered in small holes. Much more effective is the H-gutter flame holder, which is shaped like a letter H with a curve facing and opposing the flow of air. Even more effective, however, is the V-gutter flame holder, which is shaped like a V with the point in the direction facing the flow of air. Some studies have suggested that adding a small amount of base bleed to a V-gutter helps reduce drag without reducing effectiveness. The most effective of the flame holders are the step type flame holder and the strut type flame holder.

The first mathematical model of a flame holder was proposed in 1953.

== See also ==
- Index of aviation articles
- AVPIN - A monofuel used to power turbojet starter motors.
- Components of jet engines
- Exhaust mixer
