= Transport World =

Tourism organisation in New Zealand

Coordinates: 46°24′36.73″S 168°22′50.7″E

- Formation: December 2015; 10 years ago
- Founder: Jocelyn O'Donnell
- Founded at: Dart Street, Invercargill
- Type: Tourism business
- Purpose: Museums, attraction, education, events
- Location: 491 Tay Street, Invercargill
- Owners: Jocelyn and Scott O'Donnell
- Parent organization: HWR Group
- Subsidiaries: Bill Richardson Transport World; Classic Motorcycle Mecca
- Website: transportworld.nz

Transport World is a tourism organisation located in Invercargill, New Zealand. It has four branches: Bill Richardson Transport World, Classic Motorcycle Mecca, Lodges at Transport World, and Dig this Invercargill. Bill Richardson Transport World and Classic Motorcycle Mecca are transport displays, showcasing over 300 vintage vehicles alongside relevant interactive activities. The Lodges At Transport World are apartment accommodations and Dig This Invercargill is an attraction that allows tourists to operate diggers and heavy construction equipment.

== Bill Richardson Transport World ==
Bill Richardson Transport World is a transport museum in Invercargill. The museum is a 15,000 square metres (160,000 sq ft) complex of over 300 vehicles and includes a wide range of other transport-related objects. A highlight of the display is a rare 1940 Dodge Airflow truck. Bill Richardson Transport World also displays wearable arts and social history objects. It also has a construction zone for children, a library with a focus on transport and manuals, and an events and conference centre. The facility includes a restaurant, The Grille Café.

== Classic Motorcycle Mecca ==
Classic Motorcycle Mecca is a motorcycle museum in Invercargill. The museum collection includes over 300 classic motorcycles of mostly British and American makes, with some German and Italian models. It is the largest display of motorcycles in New Zealand.

== The Lodges at Transport World ==
The Lodges at Transport World are apartment accommodations for visitors, consisting of 6 two bedroom apartments. The Lodges were opened in mid-2017 and are managed by Graeme and Esther Bradford.

== Dig This Invercargill ==
Dig This Invercargill is based on the successful Dig This Las Vegas attraction. It was opened in October 2017 and allows visitors to operate diggers and heavy construction equipment. It is currently closed for a refresh, which is expected to be finished by the end of 2025.
