= Tank truck =

Motor vehicle designed to carry liquefied loads, dry bulk cargo or gases on roads

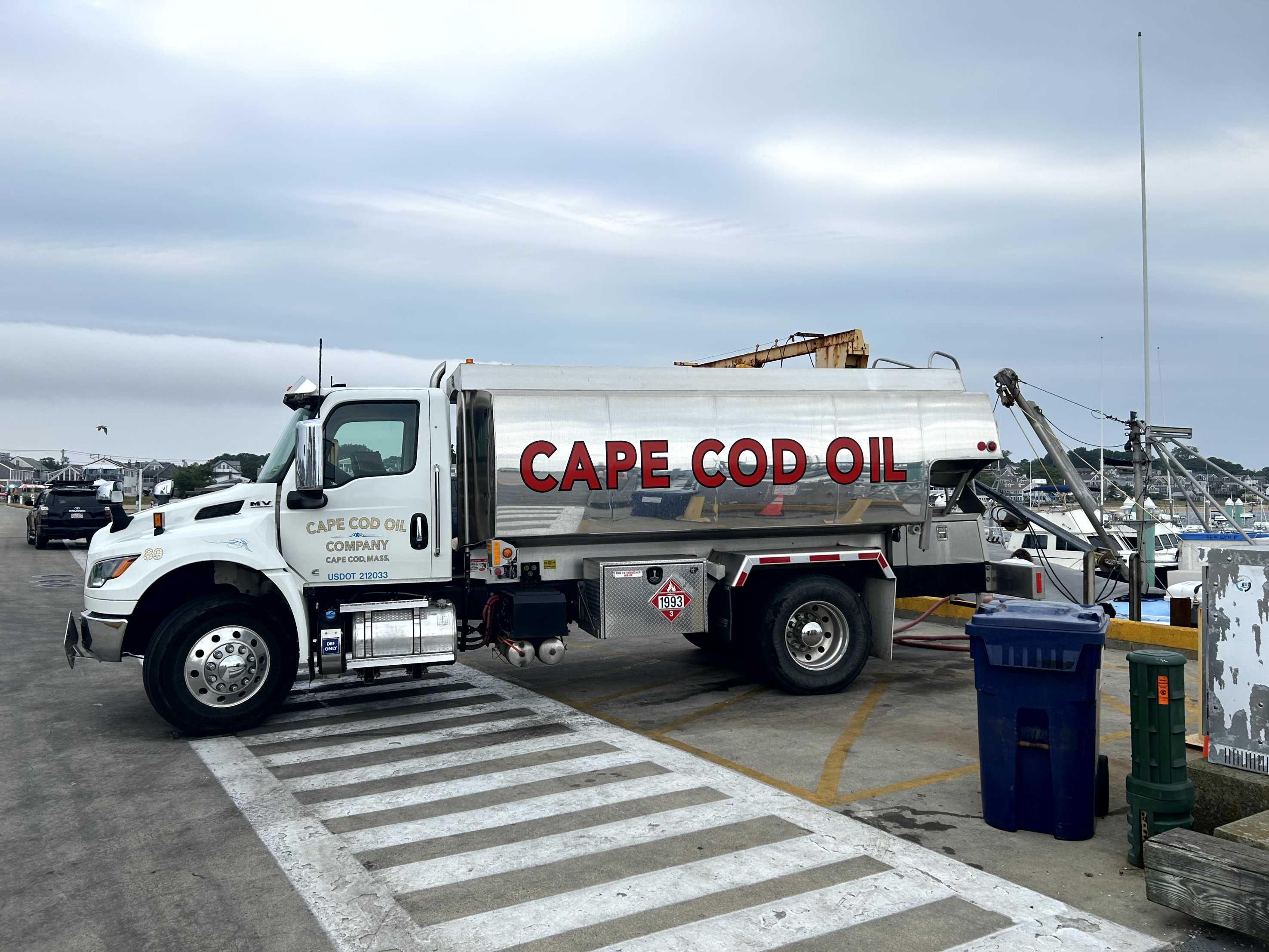
A Cape Cod Oil truck

A tank truck, gas truck, fuel truck, or tanker truck (American English) or tanker (British English) is a motor vehicle designed to carry liquids or gases on roads. The largest such vehicles are similar to railroad tank cars, which are also designed to carry liquid loads. Many variants exist due to the wide variety of liquids that can be transported. Tank trucks tend to be large; they may be insulated or non-insulated; pressurized or non-pressurized; and designed for single or multiple loads (often by means of internal divisions in their tank). Some are semi-trailer trucks. They are difficult to drive and highly susceptible to rollover due to their high center of gravity and, when they are partially filled, to the free surface effect of liquid sloshing in the tank.

== History ==
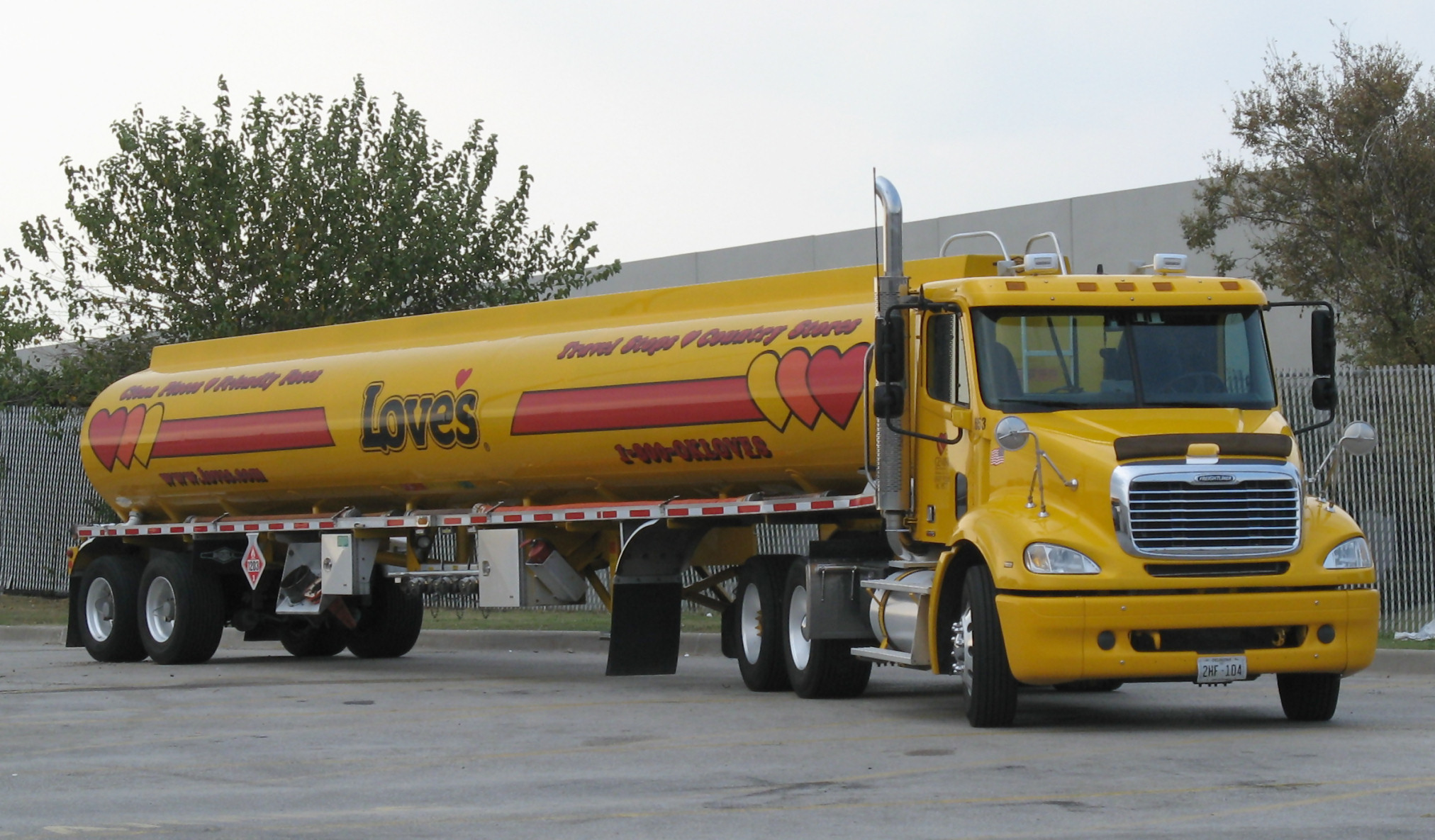
A Love's semi-truck with tank trailer

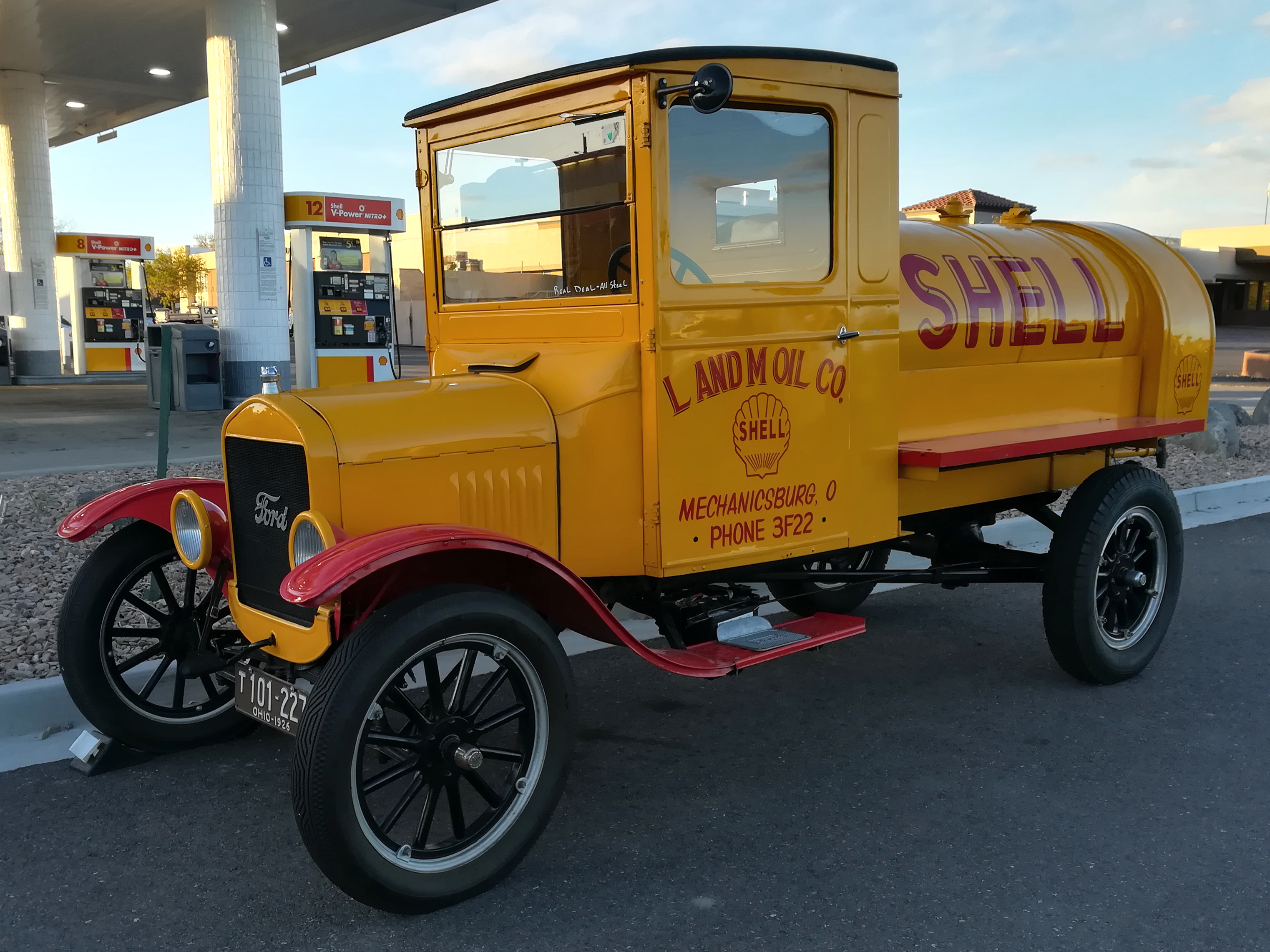
Tank truck from 1926

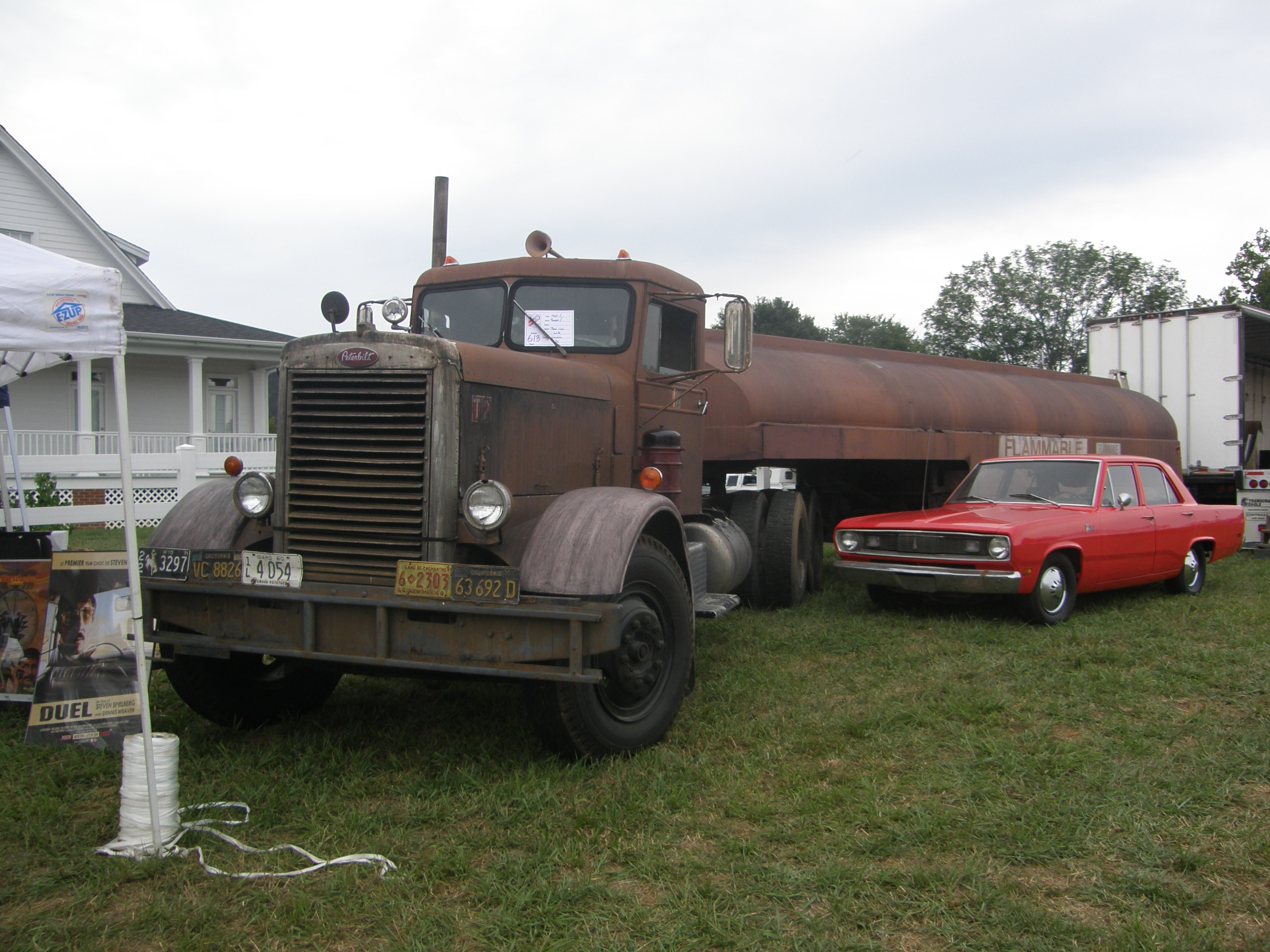
1960 Peterbilt 281 tanker truck from Steven Spielberg's 1971 film Duel

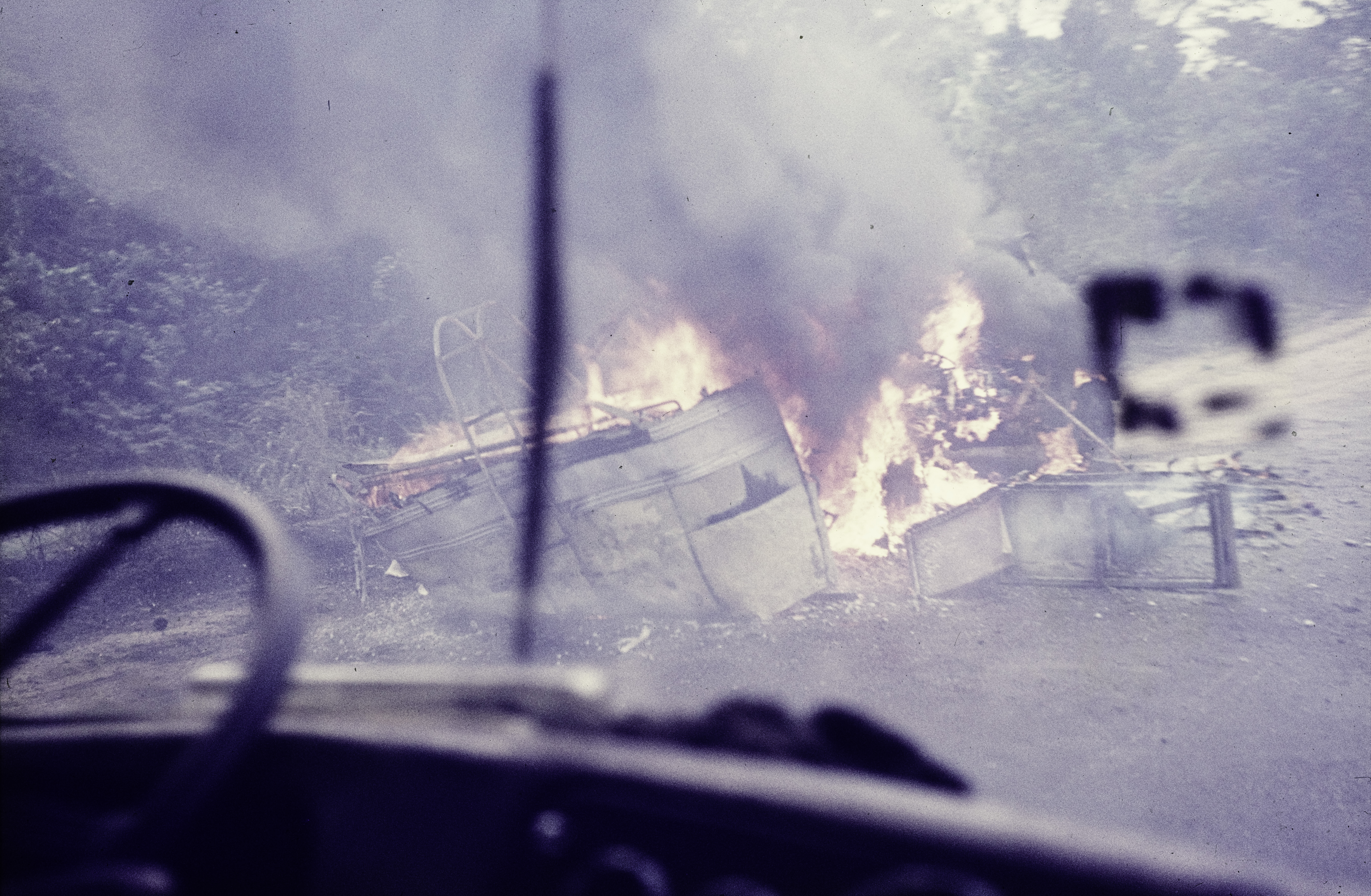
Burning car wrecks of a van and a tank truck seen through the windshield in Southern Nigeria, 1970 - 1973.

=== Oil ===
Prior to tank distribution, oil was delivered in cans. From the 1880s, it was distributed in horse-drawn tanks. In 1910, Standard Oil began using motor tankers. Anglo American Oil introduced underground tanks and delivery tankers to the UK in 1920. Pickfords took over an oil tanker company in 1921 and soon had 4,500-litre (1,200 US gal; 1,000 imp gal) tankers, with 16,000 litres (4,300 US gal; 3,600 imp gal) by the mid 1930s. Elsewhere, development was slower. For example, in New Zealand, Sir Robert Waley Cohen, of British Imperial Oil, first proposed use of petrol tankers in 1925 and the first (910 litres (240 US gal; 200 imp gal)) tanker from Auckland to arrive in Hamilton was greeted by a brass band in 1927.

== Size and volume ==
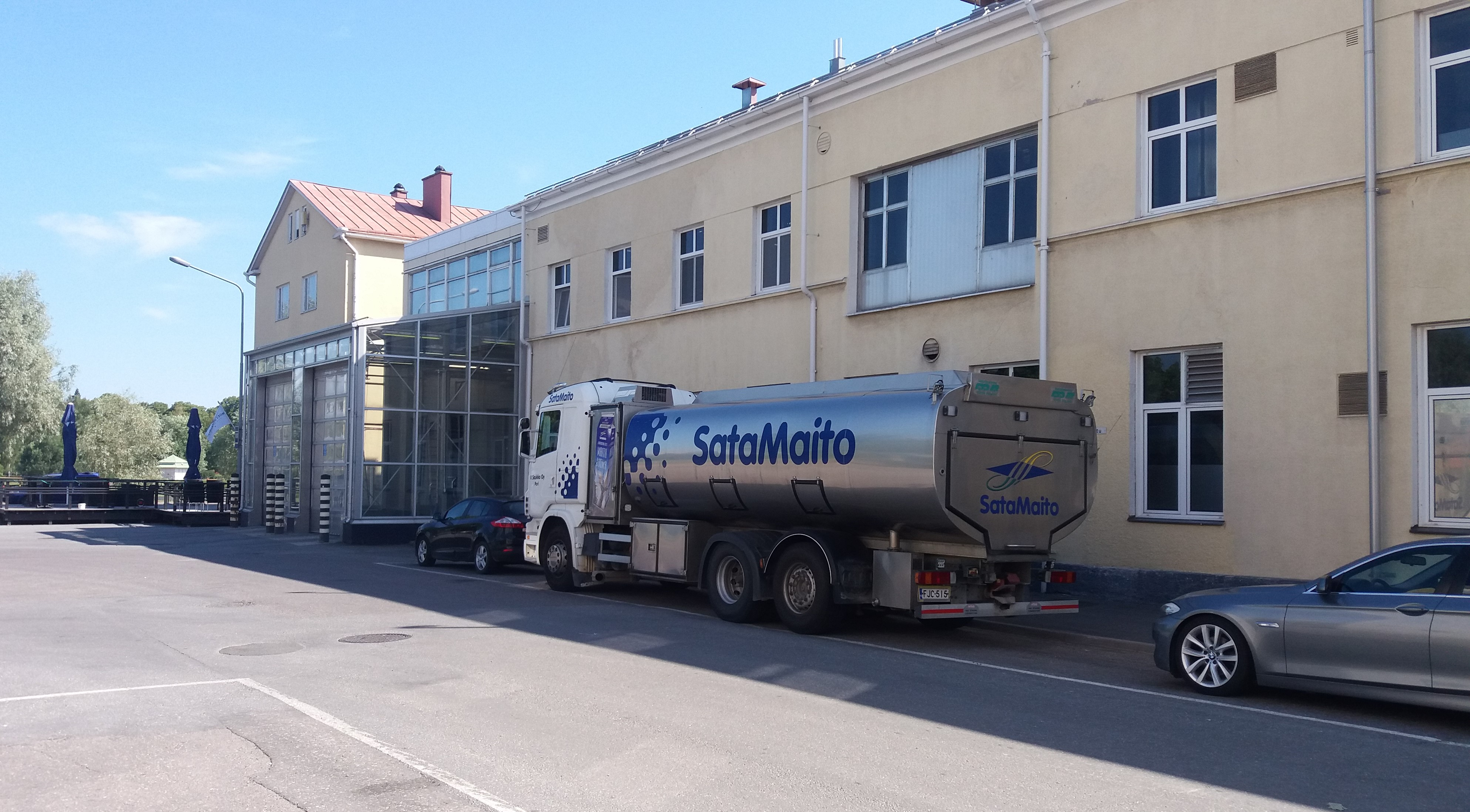
A tank truck for a milk delivery parked in front of the Satamaito dairy in Pori, Finland

Tank trucks are described by their size or volume capacity. Large trucks typically have capacities ranging from 21,000 to 44,000 litres (5,500 to 11,600 US gal; 4,600 to 9,700 imp gal). In Australia, road trains up to four trailers in length (known as Quad tankers) carry loads in excess of 120,000 litres (32,000 US gal; 26,000 imp gal). Longer road trains transporting liquids are also in use.

A tank truck is distinguished by its shape, usually a cylindrical tank lying horizontally upon the vehicle. Some less visible distinctions amongst tank trucks have to do with their intended use: compliance with human food regulations, refrigeration capability, acid resistance, pressurization capability, and more. The tanks themselves sometimes contain multiple compartments or baffles to prevent load movement destabilizing the vehicle known as the "Wave effect", a phenomenon caused by the movement of liquid within the tank due to the truck's momentum. This movement can create waves that exert pressure against the tank's walls, leading to instability during sharp turns or sudden braking and chances of rollover accidents.

== Common large tank trucks ==
Large tank trucks are used for example to transport gasoline, diesel, and liquefied petroleum or natural gas to filling stations. They also transport a wide variety of liquid goods such as liquid sugar, molasses, milk, wine, juices, water, and industrial chemicals.

Tank trucks are constructed of various materials depending on what products they are hauling. These materials include aluminum, carbon steel, stainless steel, and fibre-reinforced plastic (FRP).

Some tank trucks are able to carry multiple products at once due to compartmentalization of the tank into multiple tank compartments. This allows for an increased number of delivery options. These trucks are commonly used to carry different grades of gasoline to service stations to carry all products needed in one trip.

== Common small tank trucks ==
Smaller tank trucks with a capacity under 11,000 litres (3,000 US gal; 2,500 imp gal) are typically used to deal with light liquid cargo within a local community. For example, vacuum trucks are used to empty septic tanks and then deliver the collected fecal sludge to treatment sites. Such tank trucks typically have a maximum capacity of 11,000 litres (3,000 US gal; 2,500 imp gal). They are equipped with a pumping system to serve their particular need.

Another common use is to deliver fuel such as liquified petroleum gas (LPG) to households, businesses, and industries. The smallest of these trucks usually carry about 3,800 litres (1,000 US gal; 830 imp gal) of LPG under pressure. Typically, LPG tank trucks carry up to 3,499 US gallons (13,250 L; 2,914 imp gal) of product (usually liquid propane), on a 2-axle bobtail truck. 3,500 US gallons and greater requires a 3-axle truck (tank wagon). Some companies use lightweight steel to carry more gallons on single-axle trucks. Notably, one US manufacturer has built a 3,700 US gallons (14,010 L; 3,081 imp gal) tank truck, fitting it on a single axle.

Tank trucks are also used to fuel aircraft at airports.

== Gallery ==
Tank trucks

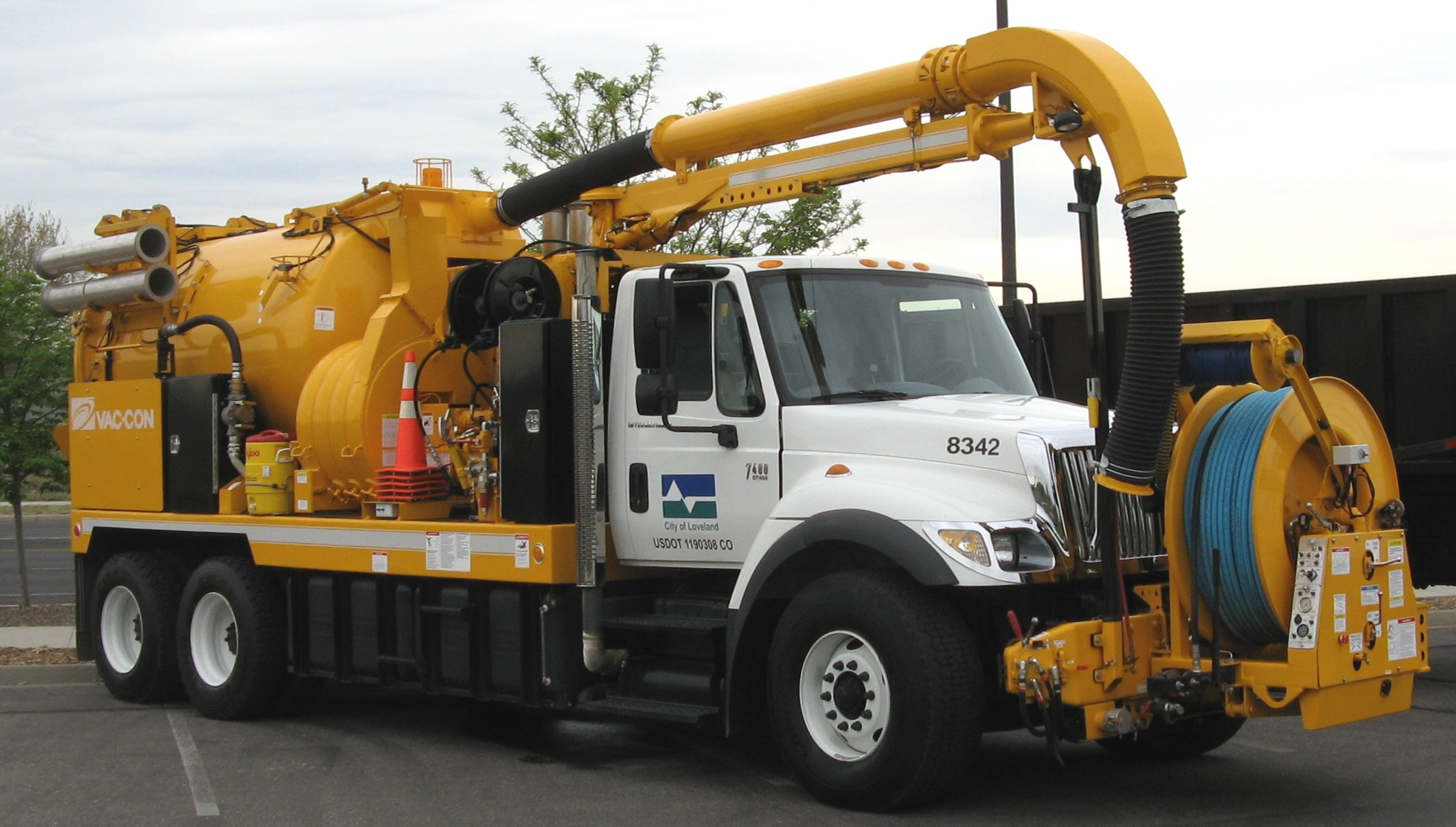
Sewer vacuum truck

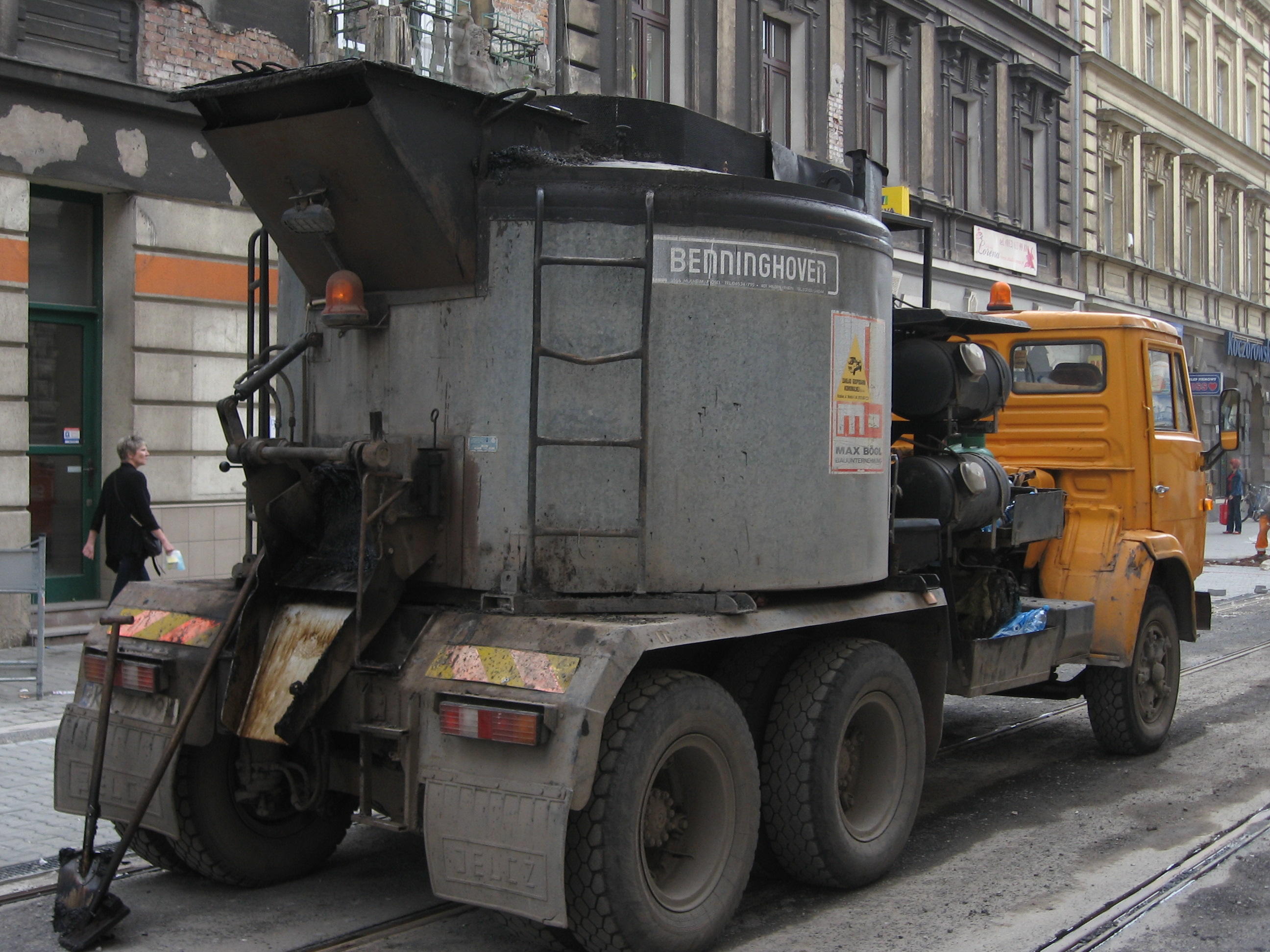
Asphalt tank truck

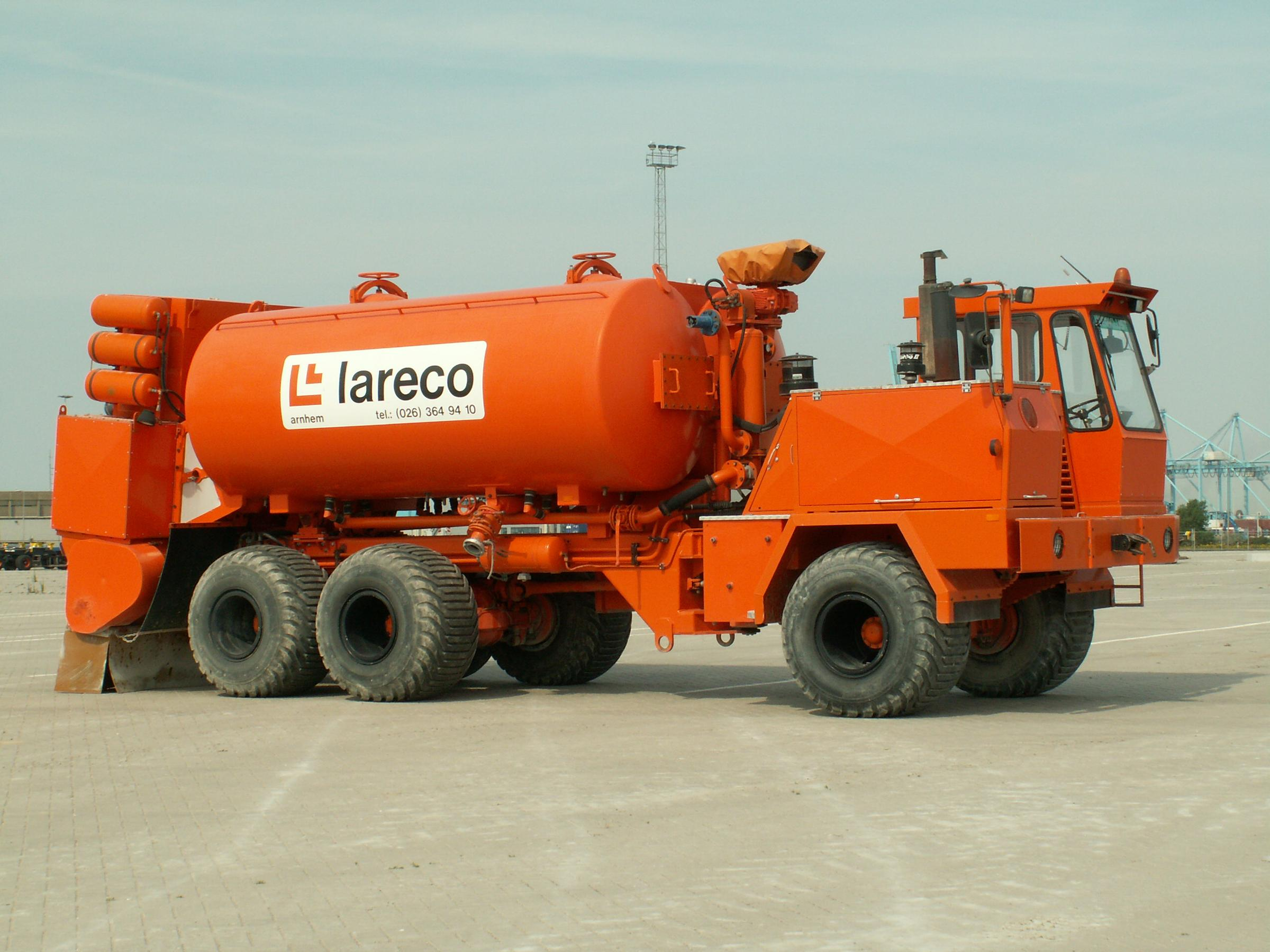
Cement tank truck

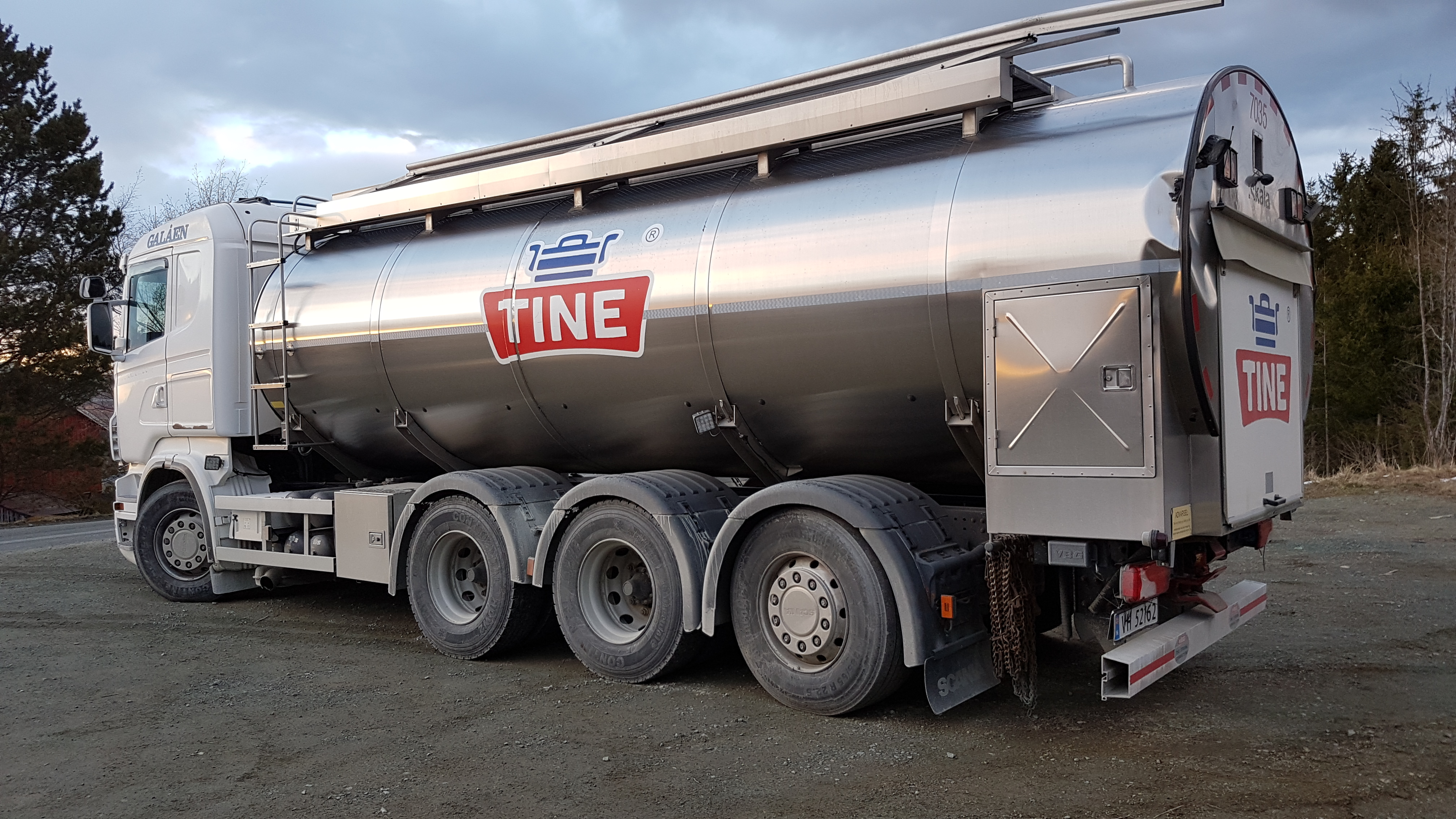
Stainless steel milk truck

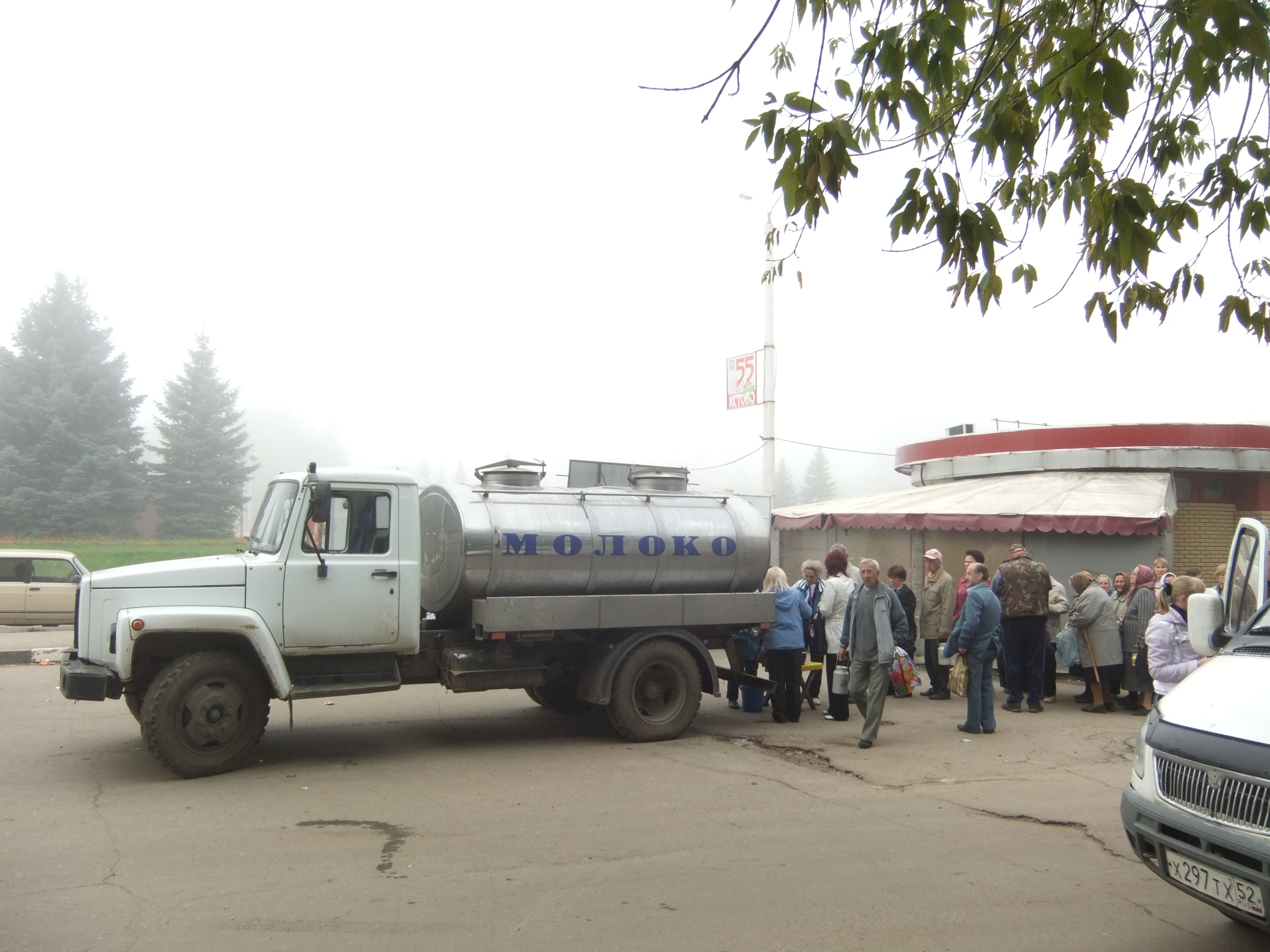
Milk sold from a tank truck

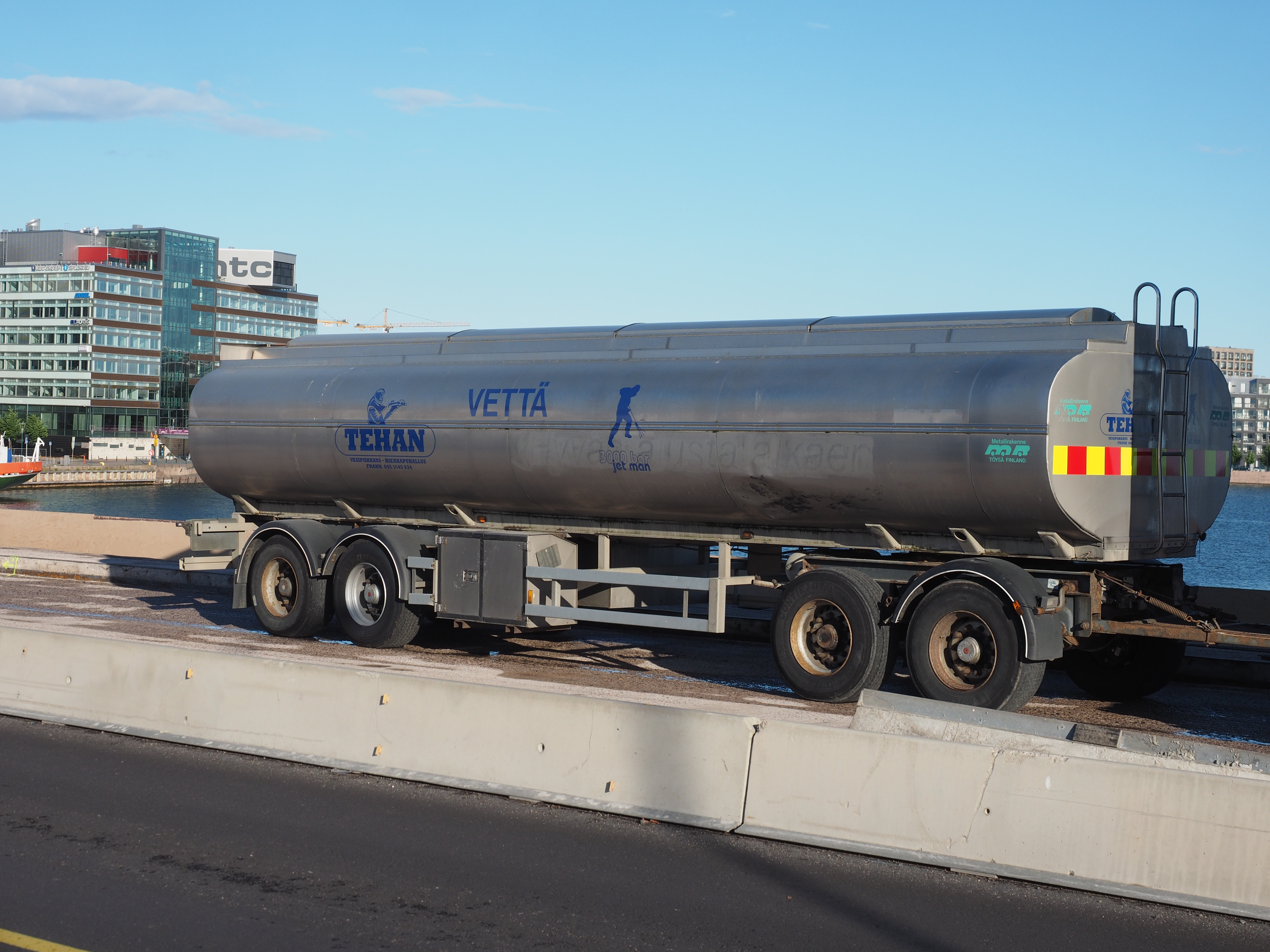
Water dispenser

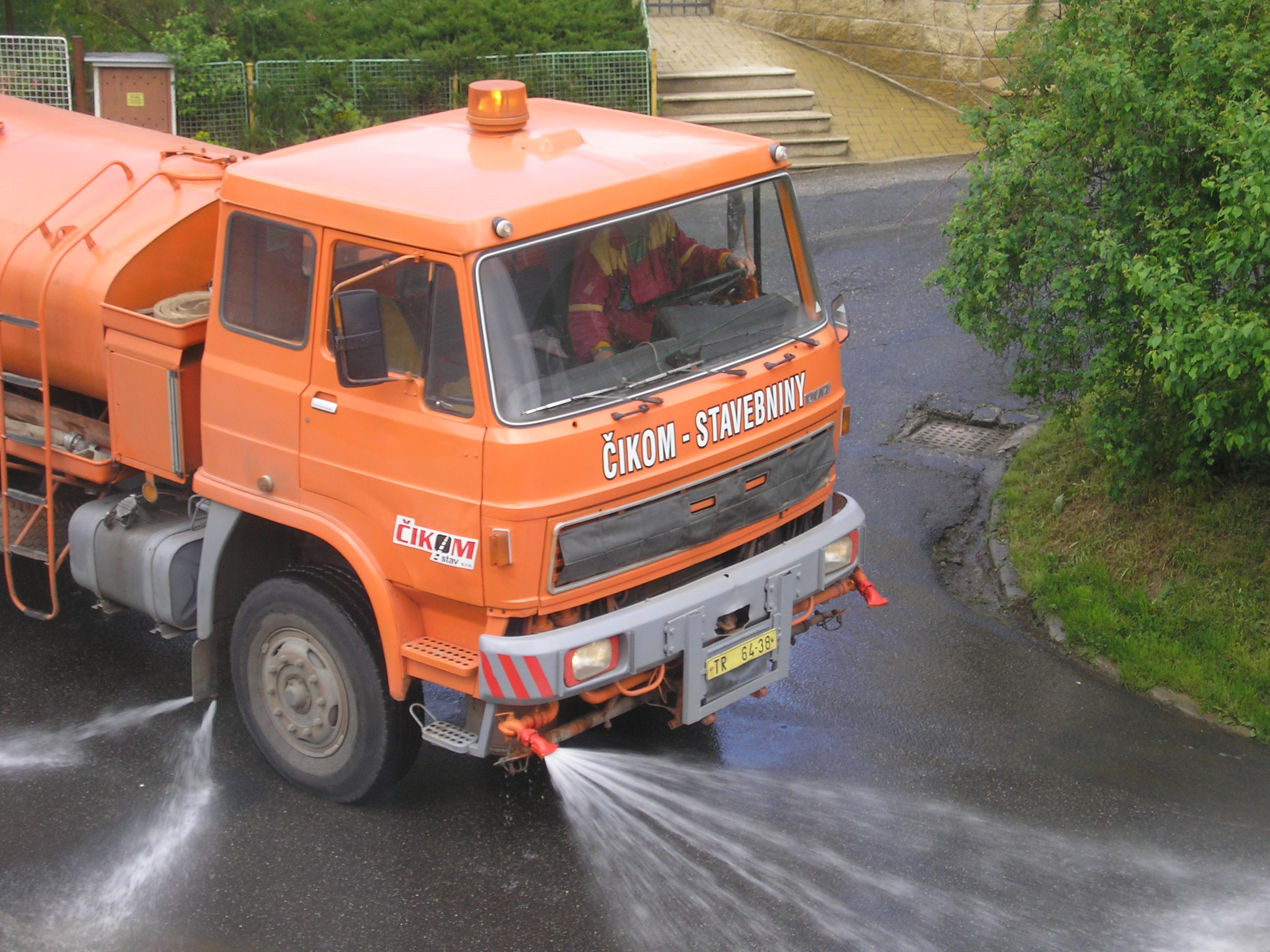
Street cleaner

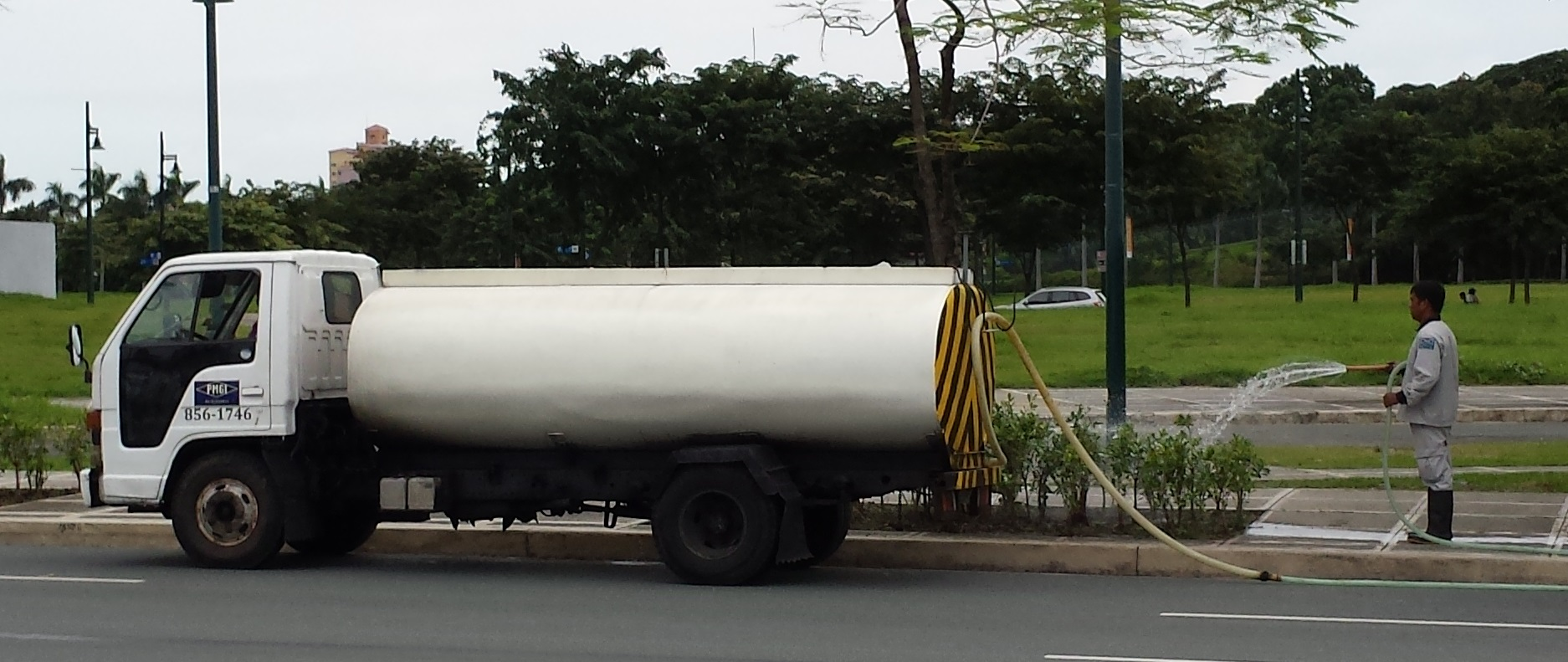
Watering of plants from a tank truck

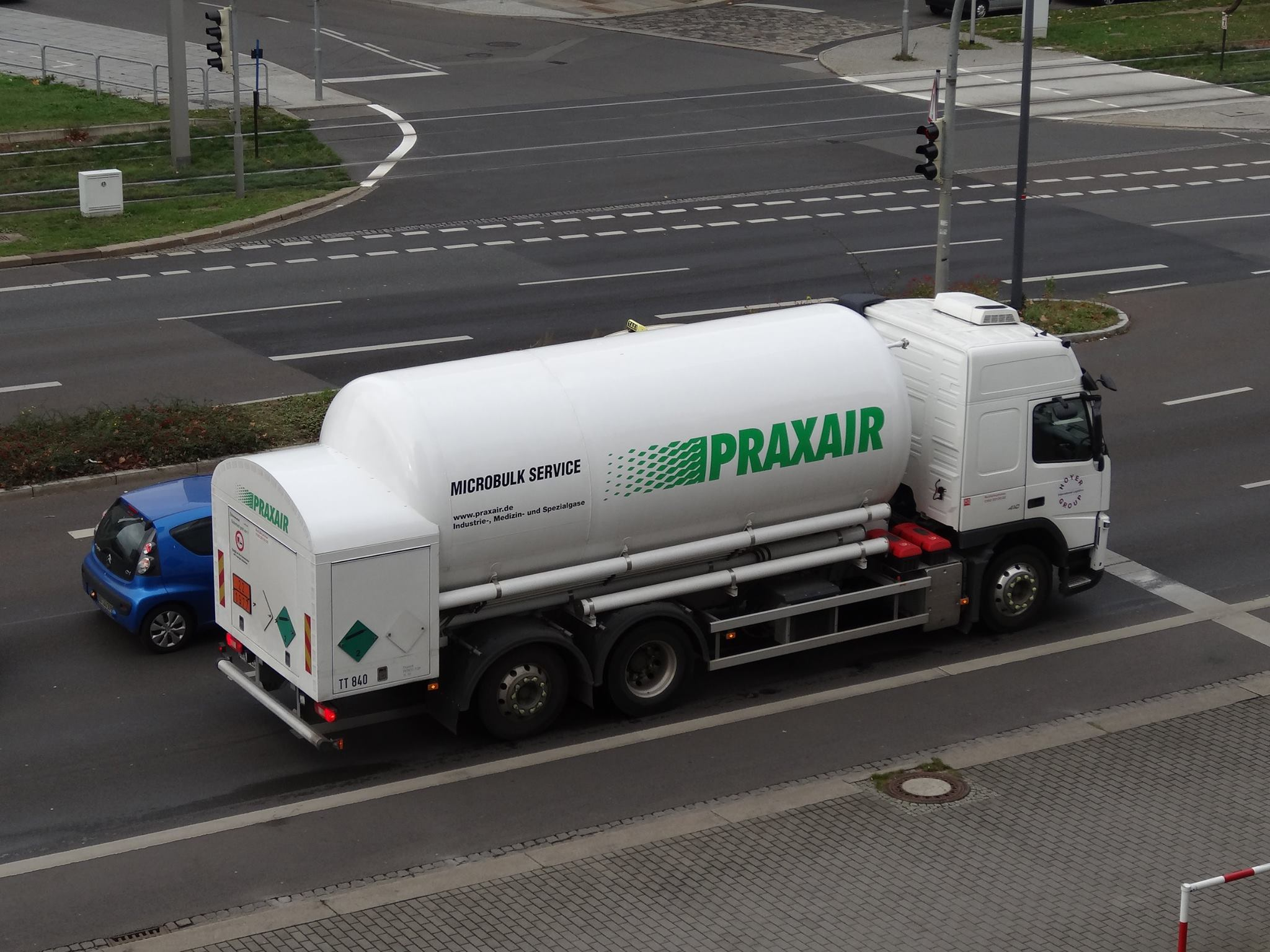
Compressed gas tank truck

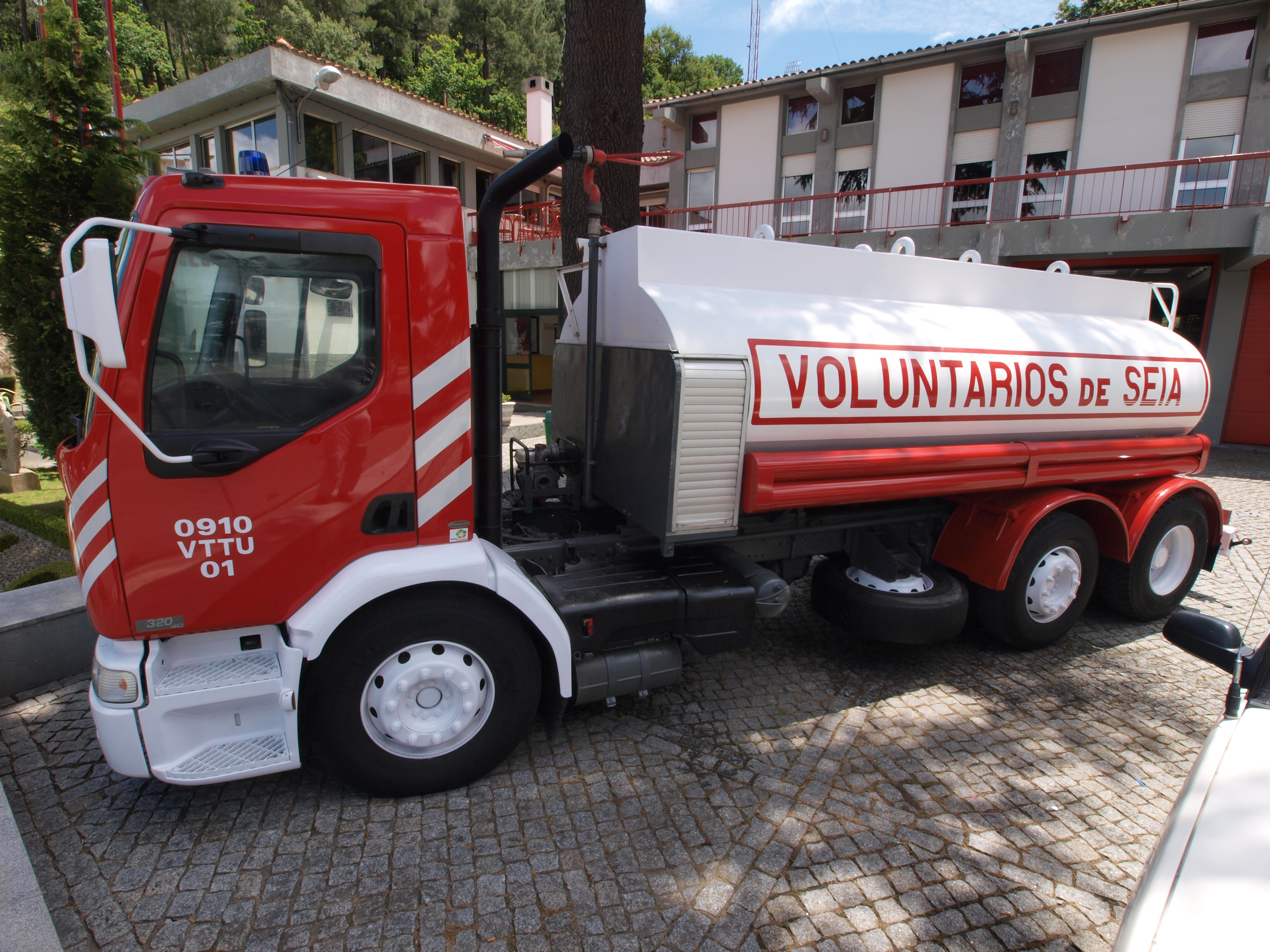
Firefighting water tender

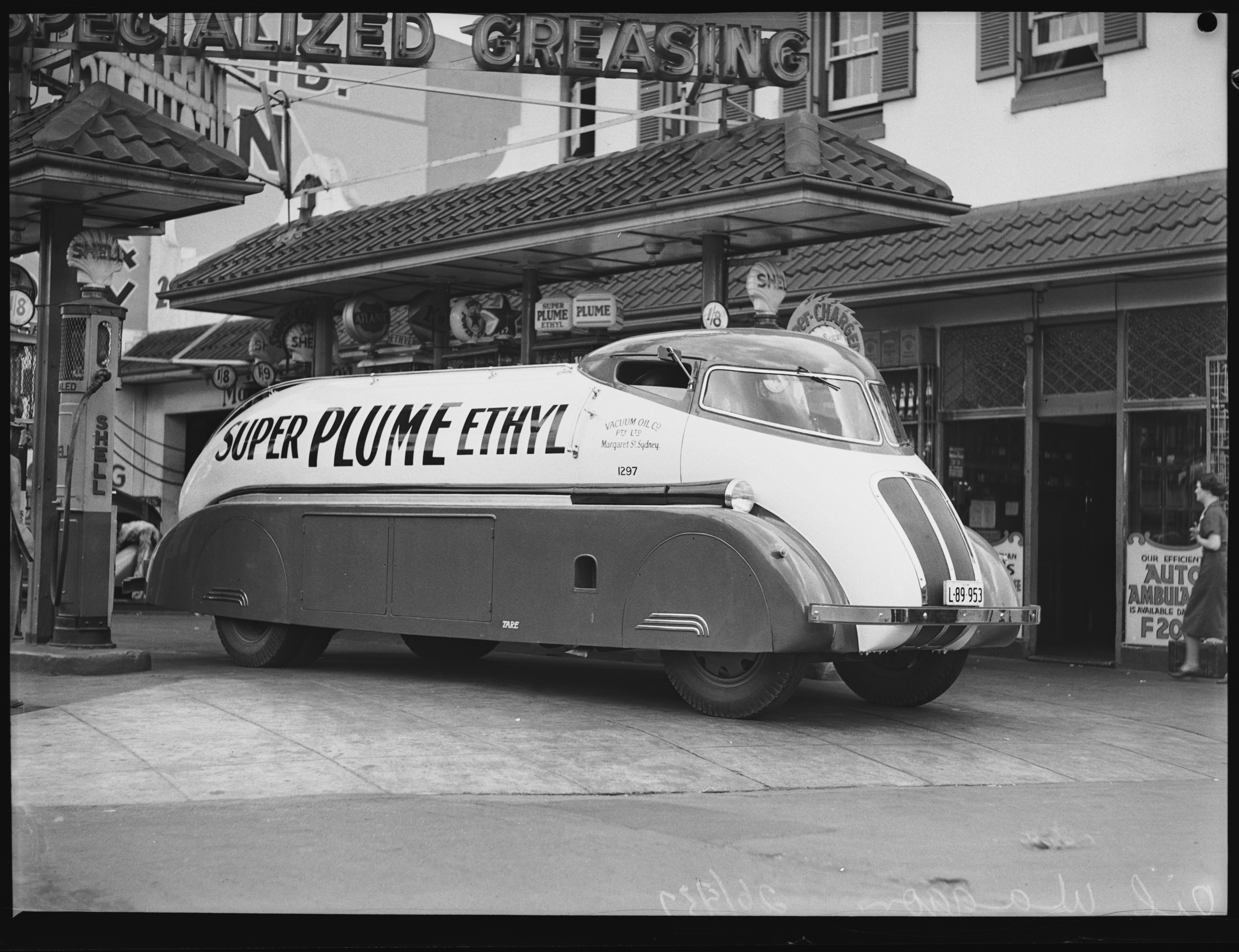
Vacuum Oil Company truck, Sydney, 1937

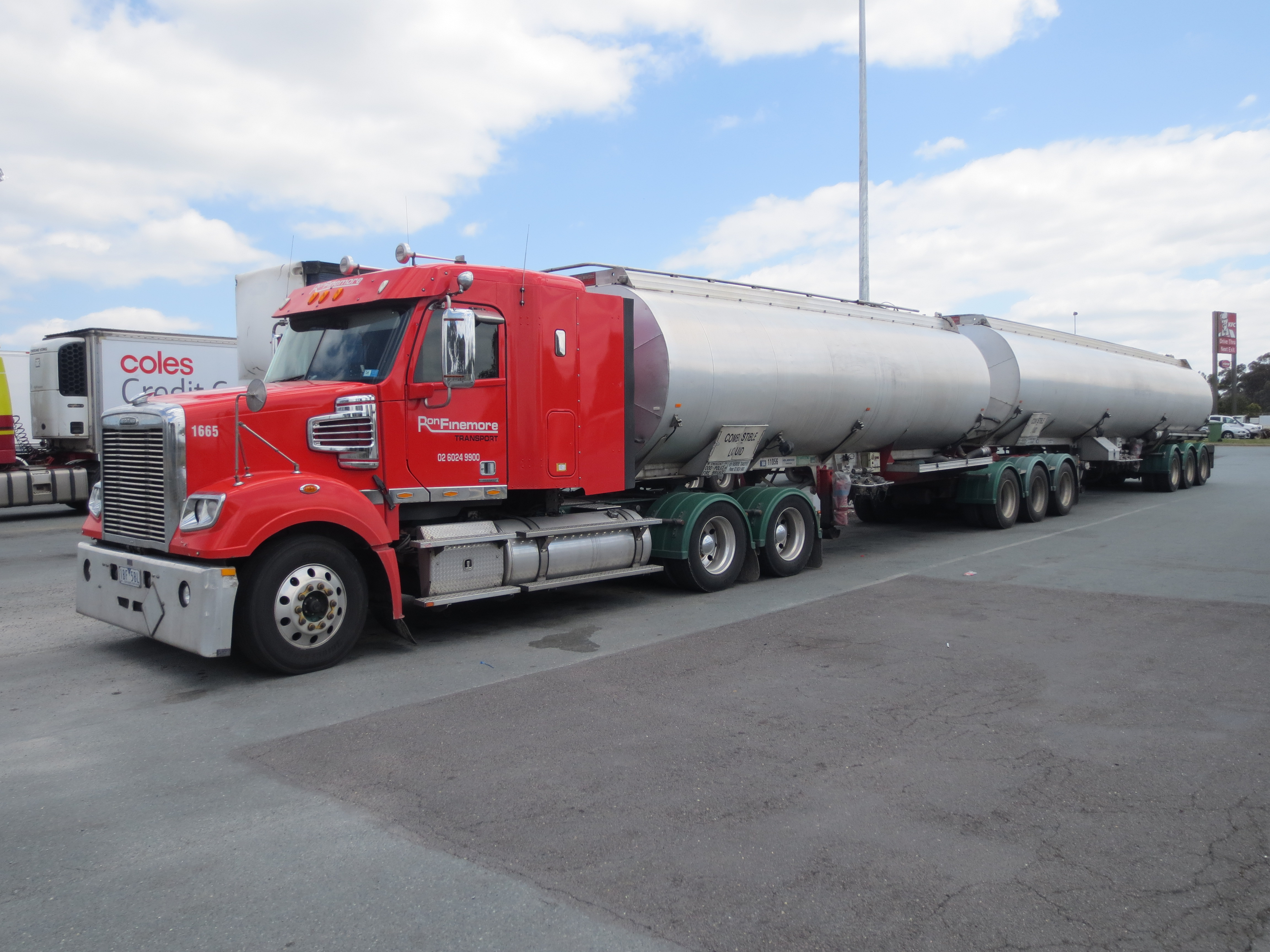
B double tanker

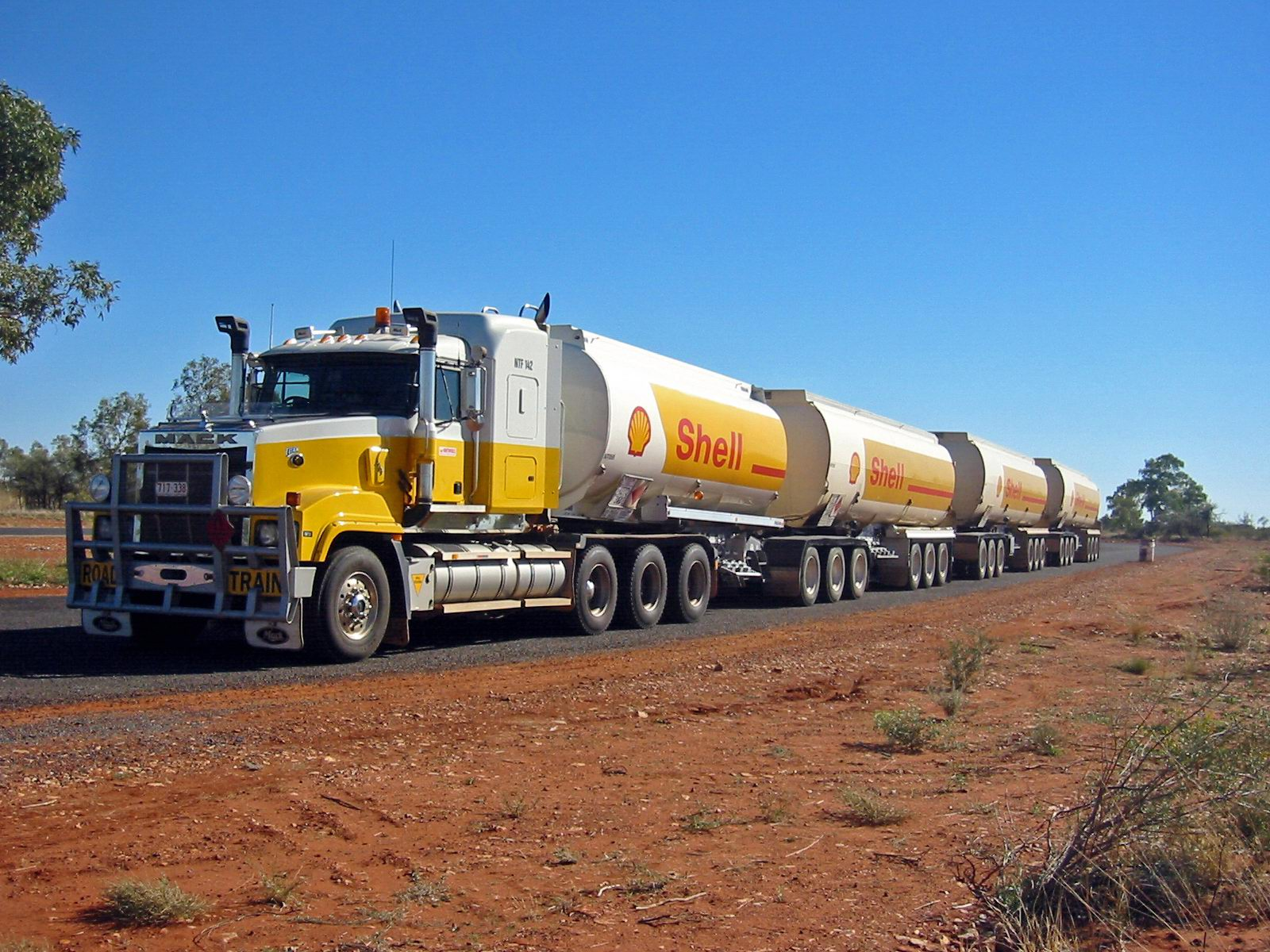
Road train

== See also ==
- Bowser (tanker)
- Dodge Airflow truck
- Pipeline and Hazardous Materials Safety Administration (PHMSA)
- Refuelers
- Semi-trailer truck
- Slosh dynamics
- Tank cars
- Tank chassis
- Tanktainers
- Vacuum truck
