= Classic Motorcycle Mecca =

Motorcycle museum in Invercargill, New Zealand

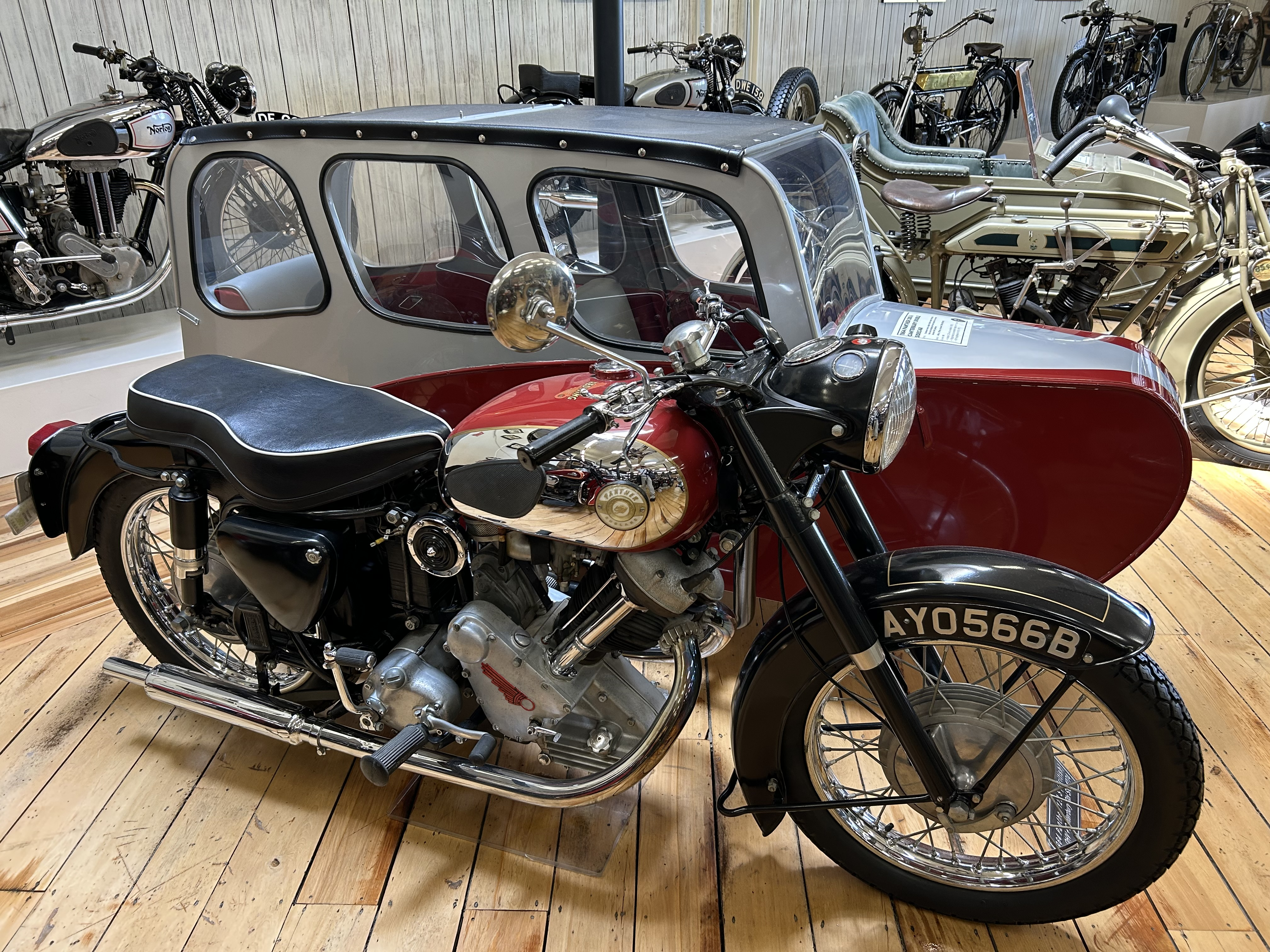
- Phelon & Moore Panther Model 120 and Canterbury double sidecar
- Established: November 2016
- Location: 25 Tay Street; Invercargill; New Zealand
- Coordinates: 46.4131°S 168.3492°E
- Type: Motorcycle museum
- Collection size: Over 325 motorcycles
- Owner: Transport World
- Website: motorcyclemecca.nz

Classic Motorcycle Mecca is a motorcycle museum in Invercargill in Southland, New Zealand. The museum collection includes over 325 classic motorcycles of mostly British and American makes, with some German, Italian and Japanese models. It is the largest display of motorcycles in New Zealand. The museum is operated as a tourism venture by Transport World, an Invercargill-based business.

== History ==
Most of the motorcycles in the collection were originally acquired by Tom and Heather Sturgess and housed in a purpose-built museum in Nelson from December 2014. However, in February 2016, Sturgess announced that he had undergone major surgery, and that the collection of almost 300 motorcycles, which had been open to the public for a year, was to revert to being a private collection. In May 2016, Transport World in Invercargill purchased the collection for relocation to new premises in Invercargill. The manager of the collection in Nelson, Dave Roberts, moved to Invercargill to remain in the role. Two existing buildings in the centre of Invercargill were joined and renovated to house the collection. The name of the new museum was announced in July, and it opened on 23 November 2016. In 2017, the project received a tourism grant of $555,000 from central Government.

In February 2017, it was reported that between 450 and 750 people were visiting the museum each week. About half were international visitors, with 30 per cent from elsewhere in New Zealand, and 20 per cent locals. By 2021, the collection was housed on three separate levels in the two adjoining buildings, and included the George Begg Bunker in the basement.

== Exhibits ==
As of May 2025, the current collection is over 325 motorcycles and includes mostly British and American makes with some German, Italian and Japanese models. It is the largest display of motorcycles in New Zealand, with dates of manufacture ranging from 1902 to 2007. According to the DRIVEN Car Guide, it is the largest motorcycle collection in the Southern Hemisphere. The motorcycles on display represent examples of well known makes, such as Ariel, Brough Superior, BSA, Norton, Triumph and Vincent as well as Indian, Harley-Davidson and BMW and many less well known makers. The oldest motorcycle in the collection is a 1902 Peugeot Perfecta, a machine with a 200 cc single cylinder engine, and a maximum speed of 51 km/h (32 mph).

The collection includes a John Britten gallery, including a V1100 Cardinal. A total of only 10 Britten V1000s were produced by the Britten Motorcycle Company and are now held in collections and museums around the world. They were custom-designed and hand-built. The machine at Classic Motorcycle Mecca is number 1 in the series. The only other Cardinal on public display is at Te Papa in Wellington. The Britten bikes at the museum are claimed to be the largest collection of Britten bikes on public display anywhere in the world.

Another exhibit in the museum is a gallery dedicated to the achievements of Burt Munro and the 2005 film The World's Fastest Indian. However, the original "Munro Special" motorcycle and other items owned by Munro are in the nearby E Hayes and Sons hardware store.

The basement of the Classic Motorcycle Mecca includes a collection honouring the motorsports achievements of George Begg from Drummond in Southland. Between the years 1964 and 1976, Begg built racing cars from his Drummond garage. These cars included nine F5000 which raced against the best drivers and cars in the world.

== Gallery ==
Selected exhibits

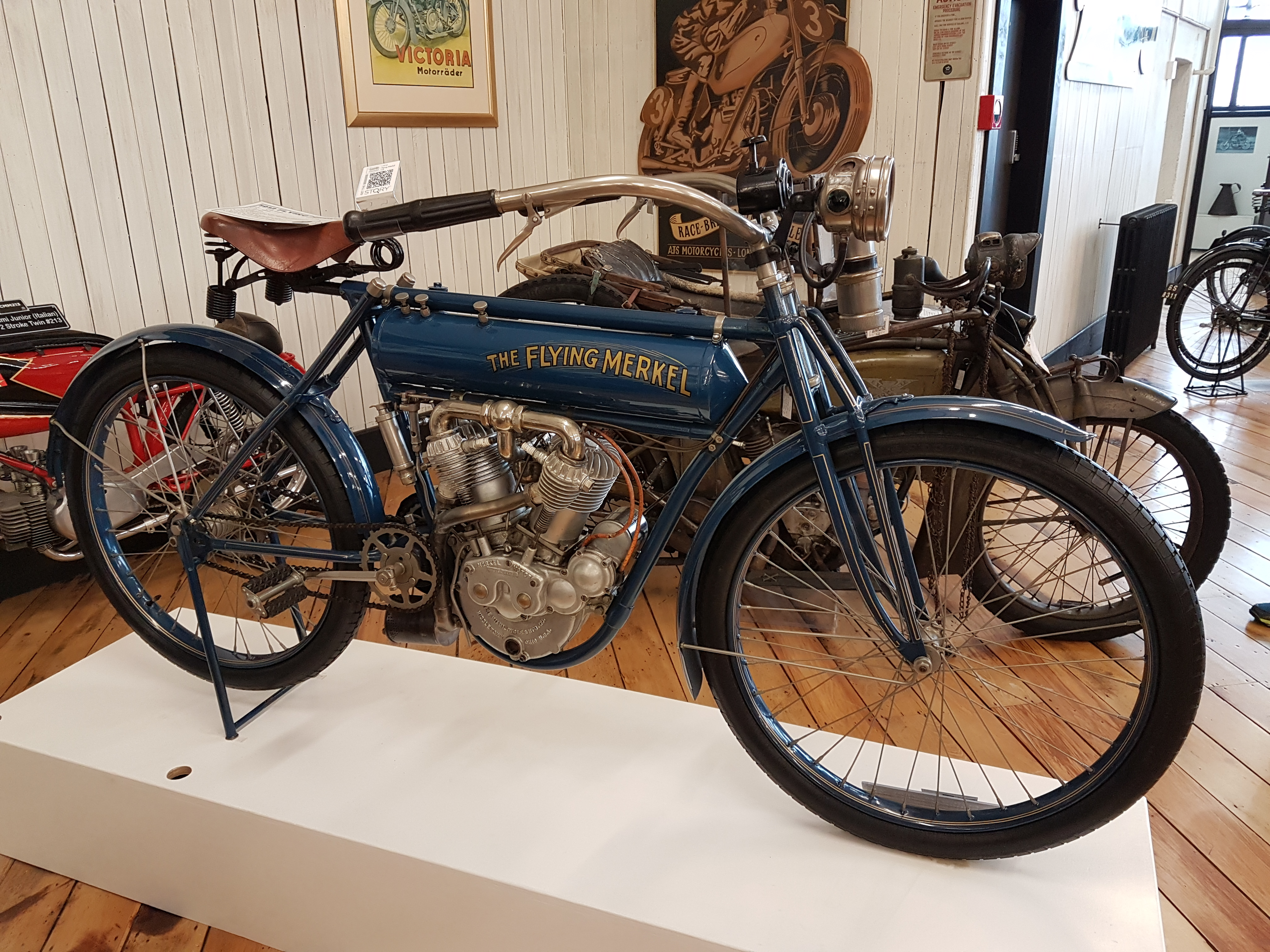
1912 Flying Merkel

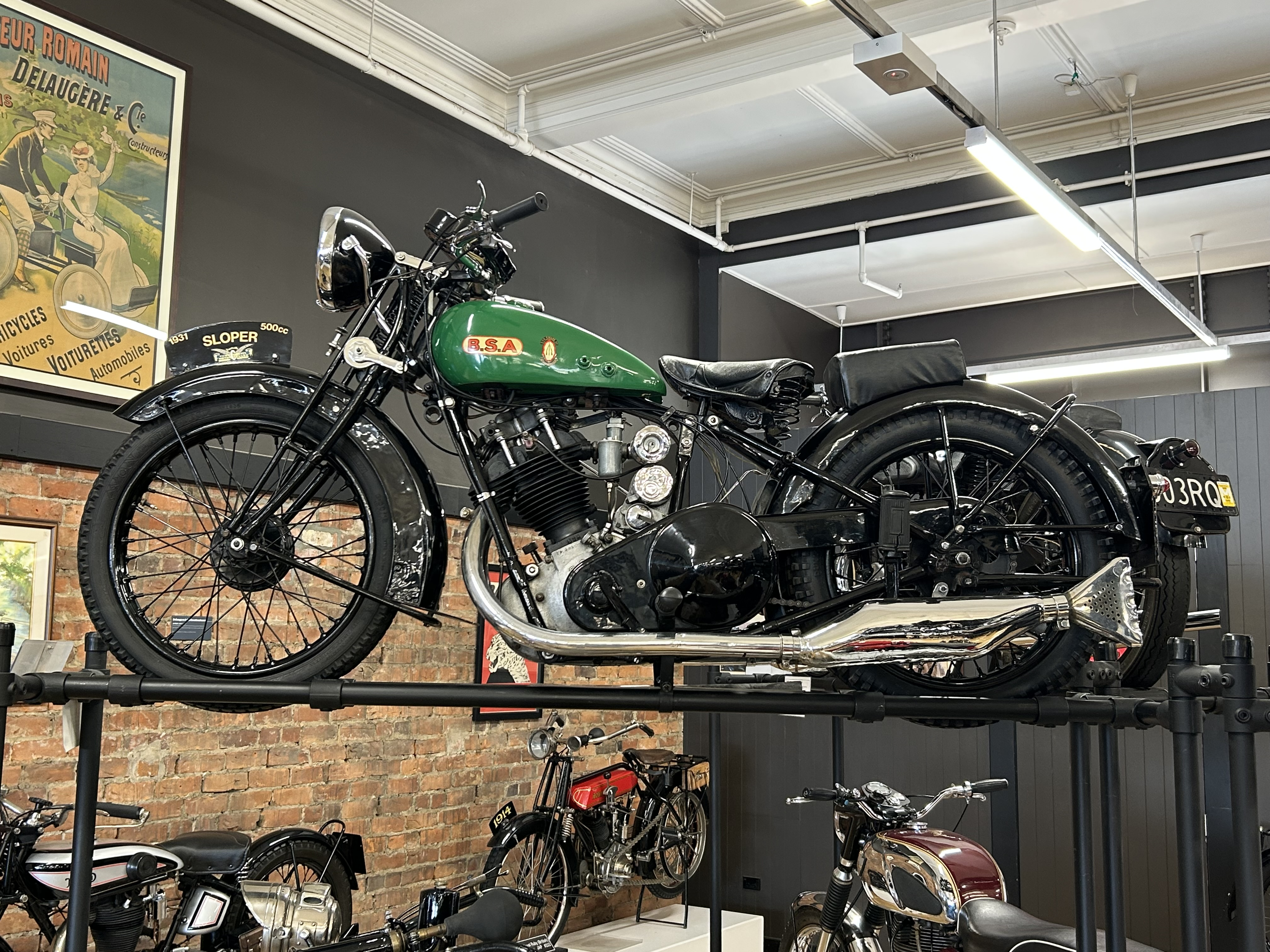
1931 BSA 500cc Sloper

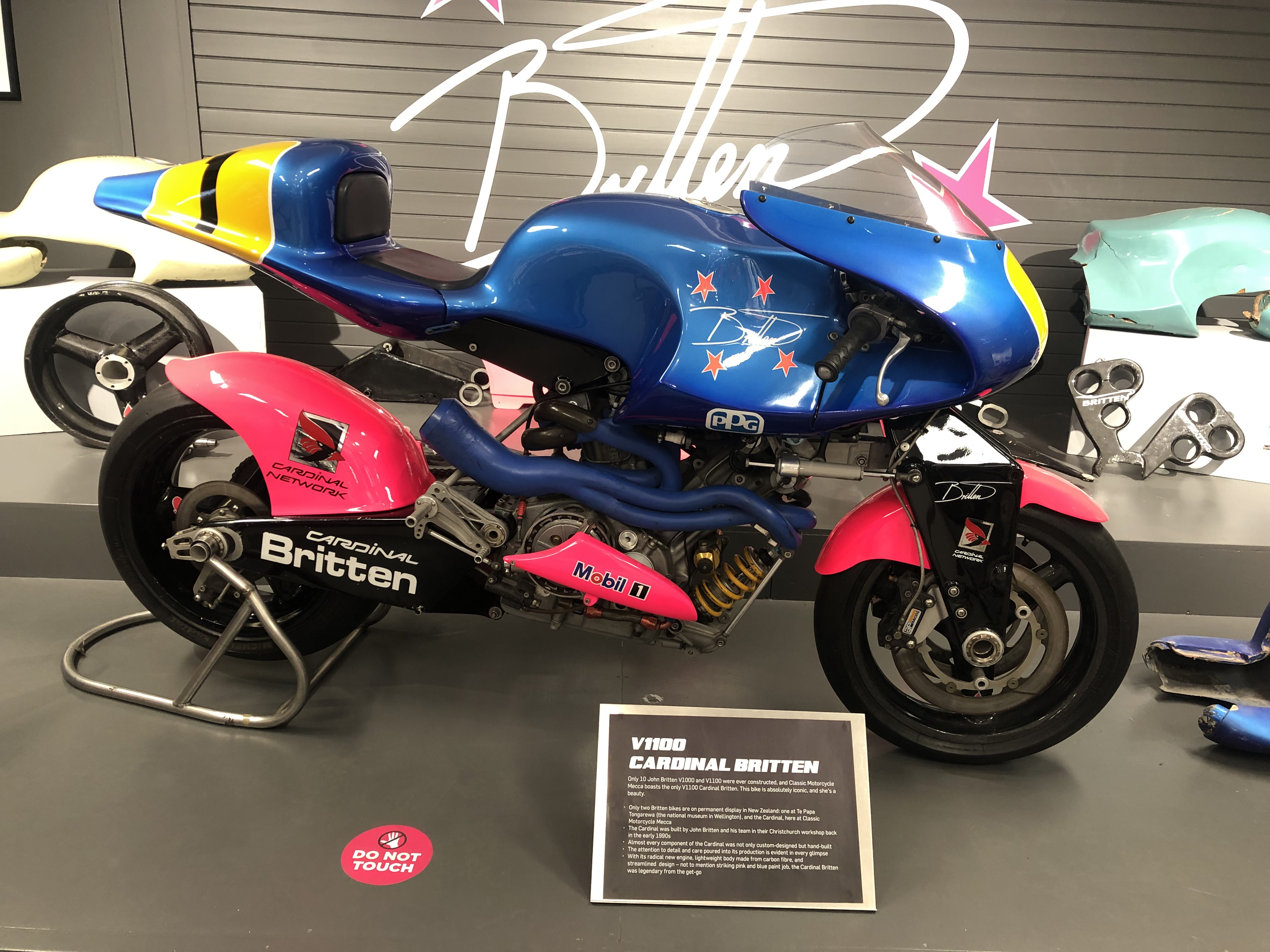
V1100 Cardinal Britten

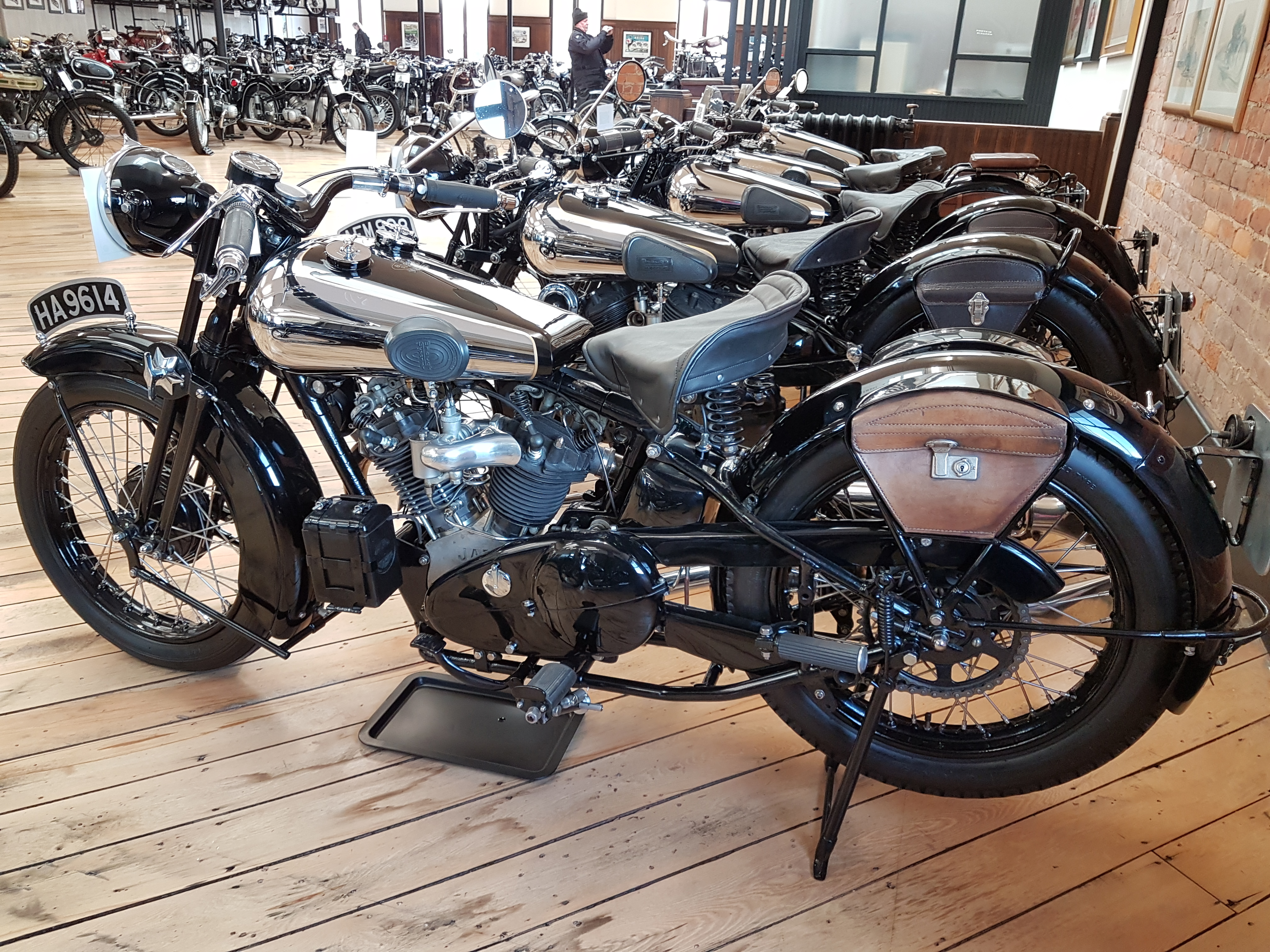
A row of Brough Superiors

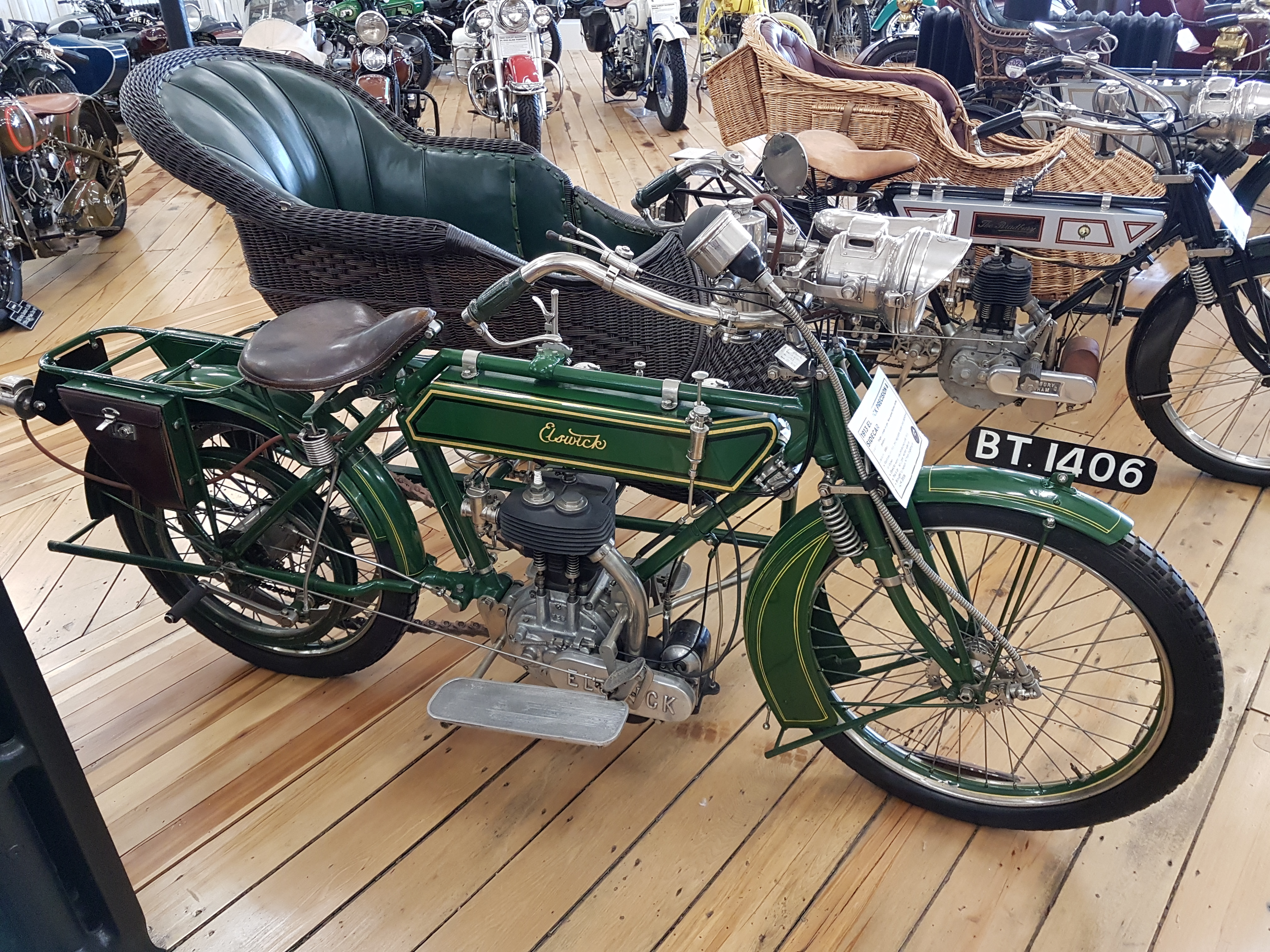
1913 Elswick with wicker sidecar
