= Optical baffle =

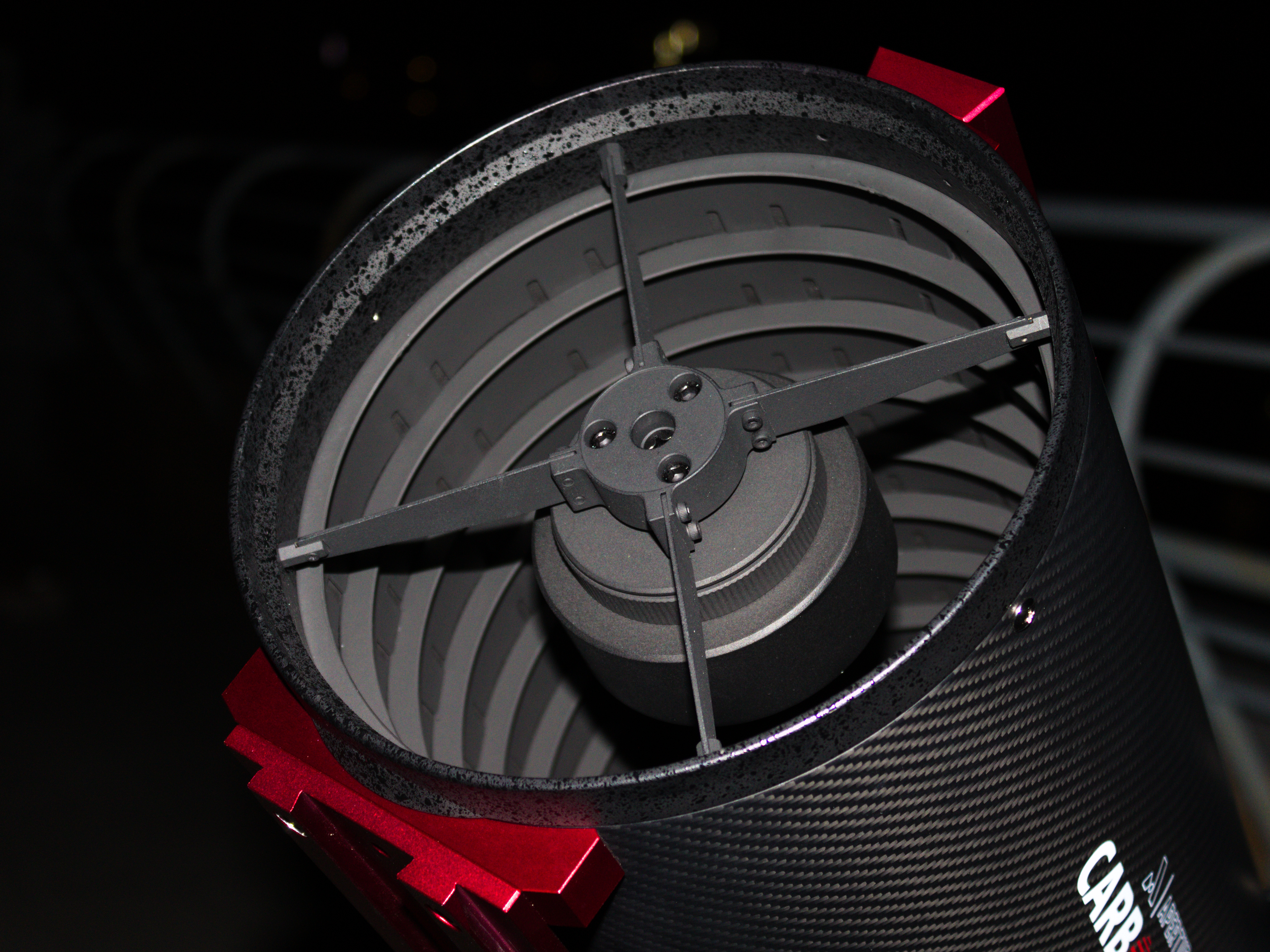
This telescope has baffles, visible as regularly spaced rings within the optical tube, to minimize glare from stars or artificial light sources.

An optical baffle is an opto-mechanical construction designed to block light from a source shining into the front of an optical system and reaching the image as unwanted light.

== Principles ==
Optical systems which have stringent requirements on stray light levels often need optical baffles. There are many designs, depending on the desired goals. Generic optical baffle designs and their advantages for stray light control can be classified as reflective, absorbing or refractive; reimaging and nonreimaging systems.
