= Baffle blocks =

Fluid controlling structure

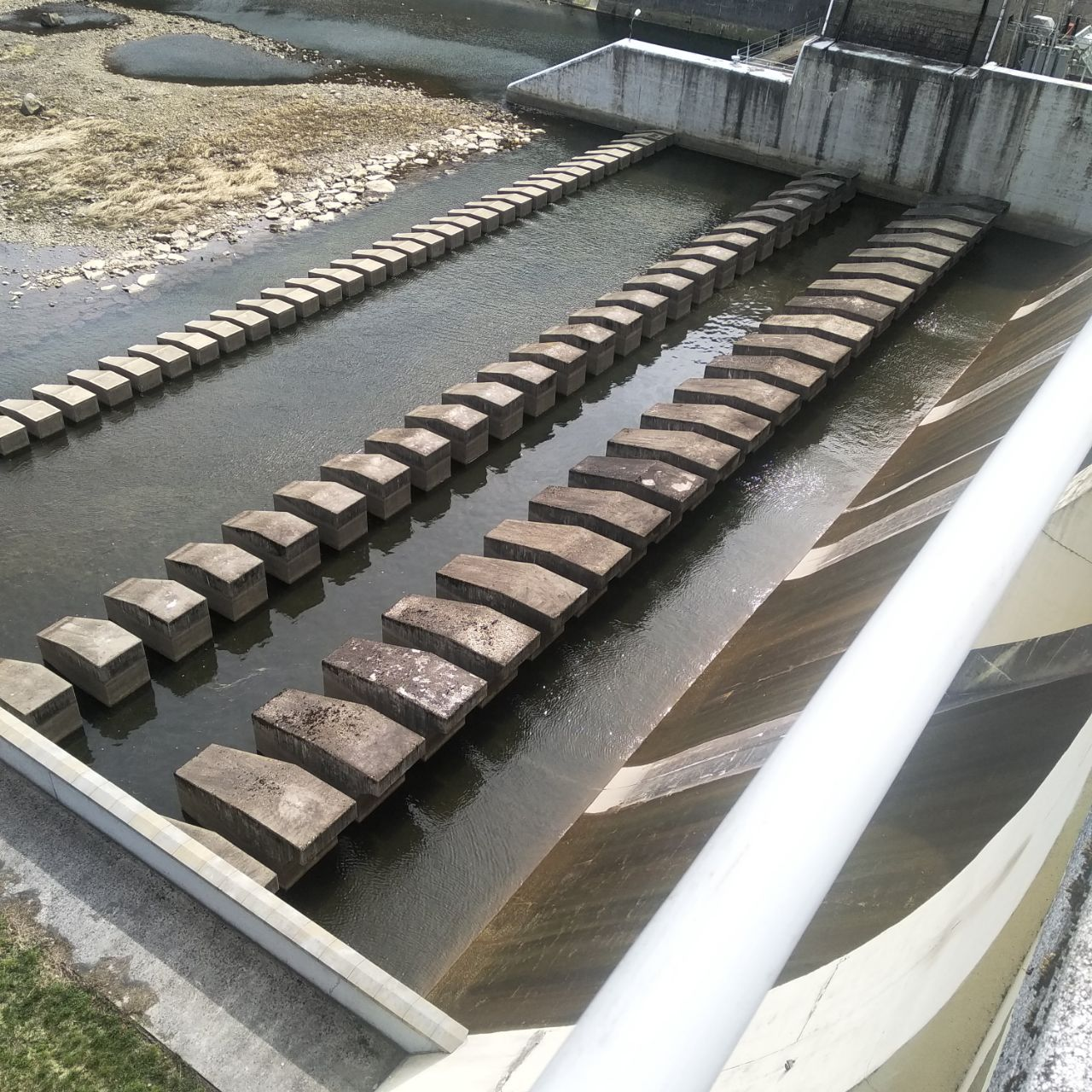
Baffle blocks

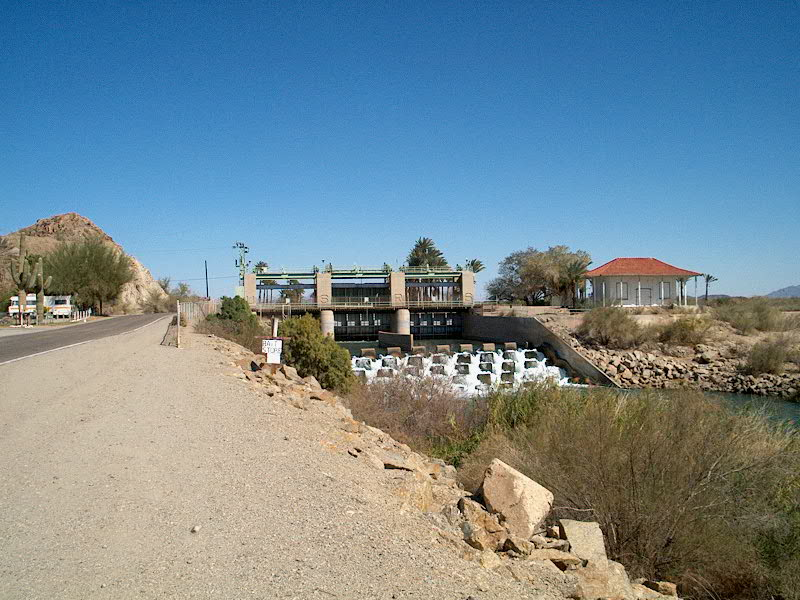
The canal spillway of Laguna Diversion Dam uses a baffle chute drop structure to pass water to a lower elevation.

Baffle blocks are concrete structures with different shapes, for example trapezoidal, used in flowing water to reduce its force. They are arranged in several rows in stilling basins. They are used in spillways and dams, in irrigation systems, to protect fishes in rivers with hydrotechnical installations, to improve sediment deposition, as a solution to scouring in hydraulic projects, and in flood control.

== See also ==
- Slosh baffle
