= Dodge Airflow truck =

1930s model truck

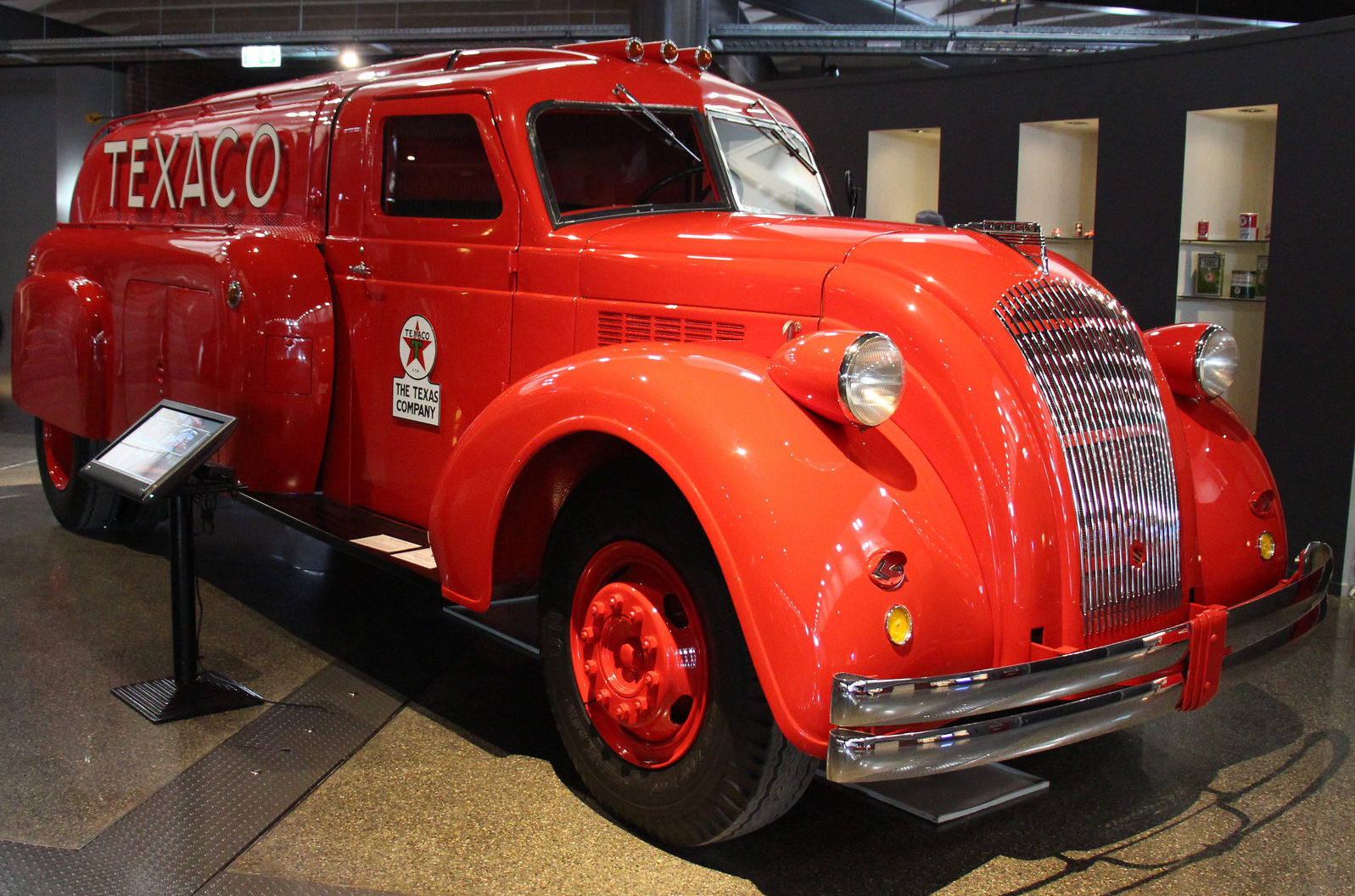
1940 Dodge Airflow tanker truck

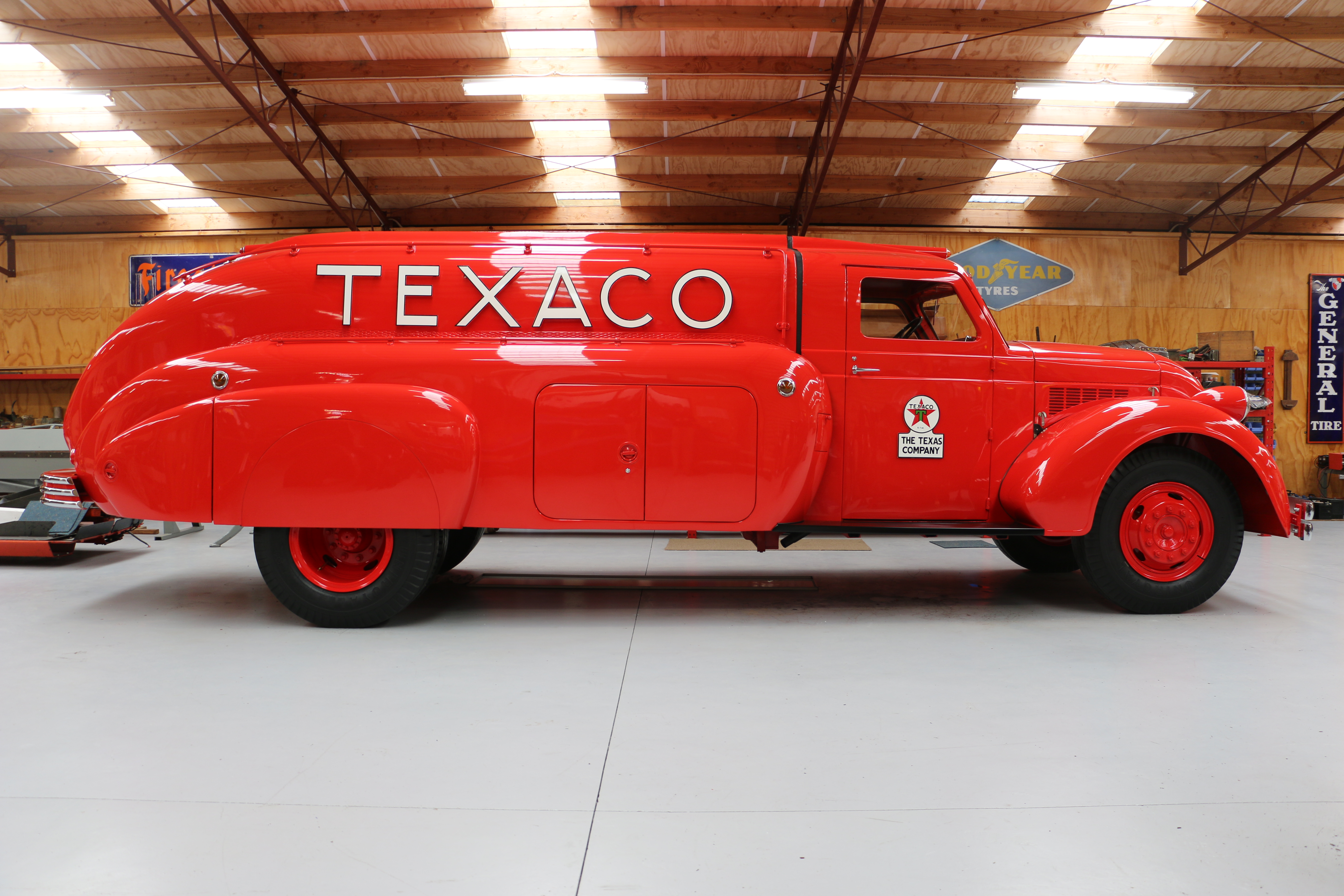
1940 Dodge Airflow tanker truck

The Dodge Airflow truck was a special request model truck that Dodge introduced in late 1934 and available through 1940. It used styling cues from Chrysler Airflow cars and the Divco 1937 Model-B delivery vans. Most of the 265 units produced were fitted with streamlined tank truck bodies, and were used by major oil companies, like Texaco, Socony-Vacuum Oil Company and Esso.

== History ==
Airflow trucks were based on standard Dodge models, so from an engineering point of view they were rather conventional, despite their striking look. Five model names were assigned successively to the Airflow production; namely K-52, LM-70, LM-71, RX-70 and RX-71.

Garwood Industries and Heil Co. of Milwaukee, Wis, among others, were the producers of the tank bodies; while the bodies of two beer trucks for Joseph Schlitz Brewing Company were built by H. Barkow Co., of Milwaukee.

== On display ==
One is on display at the Henry Ford Museum, in a Texaco design.

A restored 1940 Dodge RX70 Airflow Texaco tanker truck is on display at the Transport World museum in Invercargill, New Zealand. This truck is believed to be the only one of its type in the world that can still be driven. It was a highlight of the 2017 Southland Truck Parade held in Invercargill in October 2017.

== Other streamlined tanker trucks ==
By the same years other streamlined tanker bodies were fitted to more conventional chassis-cabs of other truck makers, like Mack, International and Diamond T.

Specially unconventional and noteworthy were the impressive Texaco's Diamond T Doodlebug tankers, designed by the futuristic industrial designer Norman Bel Geddes. They featured a Heil low profile body and used a Hercules six-cylinder engine mounted in the rear and a large radiator behind it. Air pressure actuated the four-speed gearbox and clutch, using the same pneumatic system for braking. A compound-curved windshield and curved side glass were also noticeable features.

In Australia the Socony Vacuum Oil Company owned several remarkable streamlined Reo Speed Tankers. These trucks were built on Reo Cab over-engine three-Ton chassis. Bodies were built by Martin & King Coachbuilders in Melbourne.
