= Slosh baffle =

Device to dampen movement of liquids in a tank

A slosh baffle is a device used to dampen the adverse effects of liquid slosh in a tank. Slosh baffles have been implemented in a variety of applications including tanker trucks and liquid rockets, although any moving tank containing liquid may employ them.

== Baffle rings ==
Baffle rings are rigid rings placed within the inside of a tank to retard the flow of liquid between sections to prevent a "wave effect". The location and orifice size of the rings yield varying performance for a given application.

== See also ==
- Baffle blocks
