= Gunga Din (motorcycle) =

Motorcycle built in Stevenage, England

Vincent Gunga Din
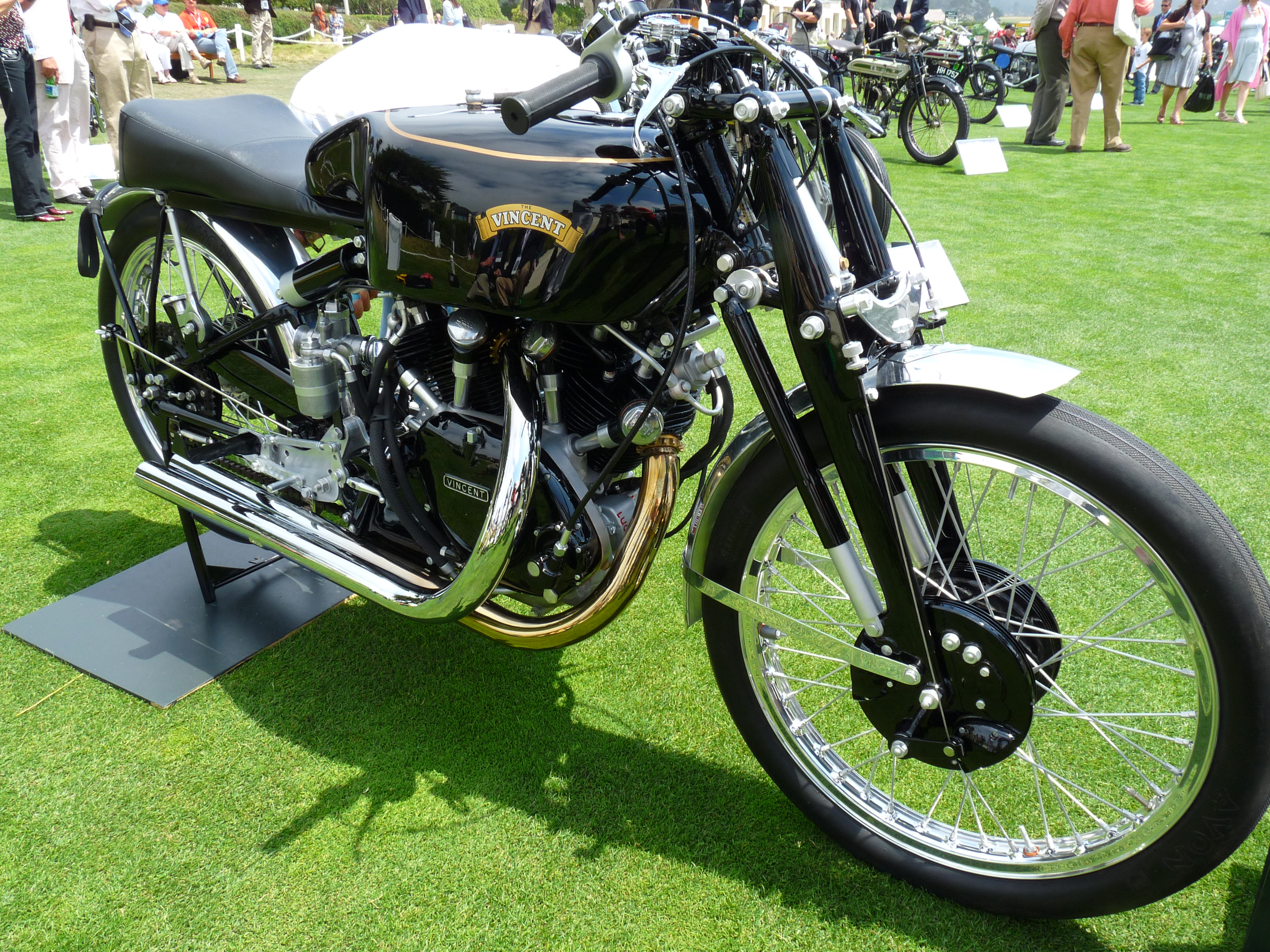
- Gunga Din at Pebble Beach
- Manufacturer: Vincent HRD Co., Ltd
- Production: 1947
- Assembly: England: Stevenage, Hertfordshire
- Class: Standard
- Engine: 998 cc (60.9 cu in) OHV, air cooled, pushrod V-twin
- Bore / stroke: 84 mm × 90 mm (3.3 in × 3.5 in)
- Transmission: 4-speed
- Frame type: box section backbone
- Suspension: rear cantilever front Brampton girder fork (original); Vincent Girdraulic (revised)
- Brakes: dual 7 in (180 mm) single leading shoe (SLS) drums front/rear
- Wheelbase: 56.5 in (1,440 mm)
- Related: Vincent Rapide; Vincent Black Shadow; Vincent Black Lightning

Gunga Din is the nickname of a particular standard motorcycle built by the Vincent HRD company at their factory in Stevenage, Hertfordshire, England. The bike was first assembled in 1947 as a Series B Rapide. It came to fill two roles; one of only two factory-backed racing bikes and a development platform for Vincent's high-performance V-twin models. Gunga Din underwent extensive modification throughout its working life until it was abandoned at the factory in the mid-1950s. Rediscovered in 1960, the bike was not restored until 2009.

== History ==
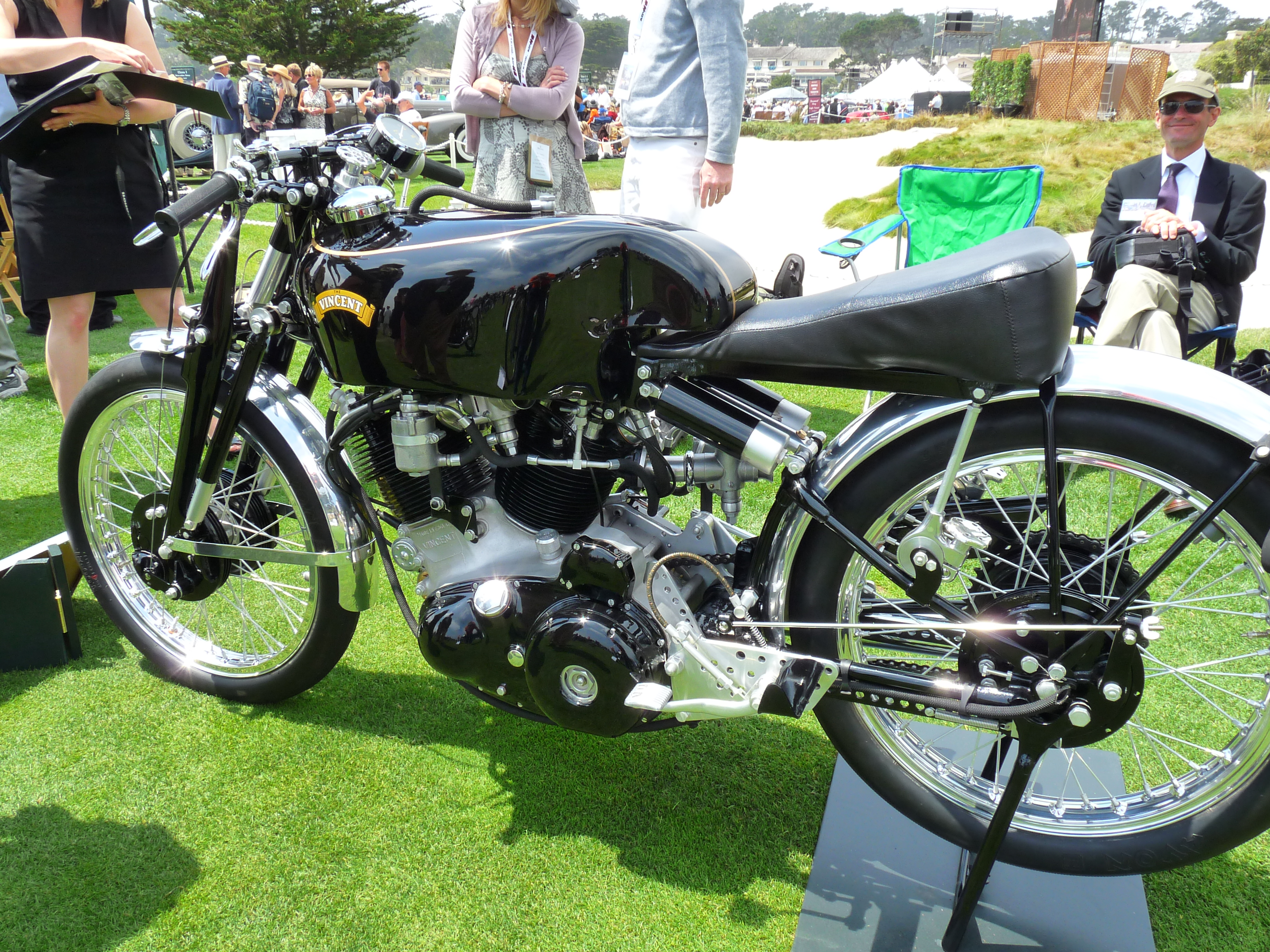
Vincent special Gunga Din at the Pebble Beach Concours d'Elegance

The motorcycle that would come to be known as Gunga Din was manufactured on 3 April 1947. It was described as a "rattler". This may have been due to the engine having been run at some point with the sump filled with kerosene rather than oil. The bike was transferred to the Experimental Section headed by factory tester and racer George Brown, where it joined Brown's "Cadwell Special" single.

The cast-off Rapide was extensively modified by Brown, working with his brother Cliff and with assistance from Vincent designer Phil Irving. The bike was given serial number F10AB/1A/71, the "1A" engine designation here meaning "modified Rapide", although this code would later be used to identify White Shadow engines. (This was the second 1A built, the first having been 10AB/1A/70 built for Jack Surtees, father of John.) Brown soon put the modified Rapide, labelled "HRD racing solo", to work on the track.

The "Gunga Din" name came from the title character of the Rudyard Kipling poem, and was first applied to the motorcycle in an article written by motorcycle racer and journalist Charles Markham. Markham was given Gunga Din for a weekend trial, and opened his review of the bike for the 13 November 1947 issue of Motor Cycling magazine by quoting the last lines of the poem, and by doing so named the bike.

Apart from its racing duties, Gunga Din also served as the development bike for both the Black Shadow road and Black Lightning racing models.

After serving as a factory racer and development mule, the bike was abandoned. In 1960 the new owners of the Vincent factory allowed members of the Vincent Owners Club (VOC) to search the old property. Peter Gerrish, public relations officer for the VOC, found Gunga Din under some sacks in an out-building on the grounds. There was extensive corrosion and the front wheel was missing, but a spare Black Shadow wheel was put in place to allow the bike to be sold. At first there were no takers at the asking price of about £250.

The bike was bought by American Tom Pelkey, who had Gunga Din shipped to his home in Wisconsin U.S.A. Pelkey began to sell the bike off in pieces. Richard Garrett bought as much of Gunga Din as he could, and verified the parts based on serial numbers. Without the funds to restore the bike himself, Garrett sold what he had to American Vincent collector Keith Hazelton in 1975. Hazelton continued to track down missing items, looking specifically for parts with the "EX" serial number indicating an Experimental part. Hazelton kept the disassembled Gunga Din in boxes for 30 years. Paul Holdsworth documented and photographed everything that Hazelton had. Eventually Hazelton sold the bike to Paul Pflugfelder in April 2009. Pflugfelder delivered the collected parts to Precision Automotive Restoration Inc. in Massachusetts. His instruction to Precision AR was to have the bike ready to appear at the Pebble Beach Concours d'Elegance in four months time. Motorcycle broker and amateur Vincent historian Somer Hooker used Holdsworth's pictures to certify that the bike at Pebble Beach was Gunga Din. Hooker also documented much of Gunga Din's later history. At Pebble Beach that year Gunga Din was runner-up for Best of Show to a 1954 AJS E-95 "Porcupine". At the 2010 Concours d'Elegance of America in Meadow Brook Michigan Gunga Din took Best in Show. By that time the bike had been sold to Canadian Bar Hodgson. Ginga Din appeared at Cobble Beach on 13 September 2015 and won the Margaret Dunning "Spirit of Driving" Special Award.

== Features ==
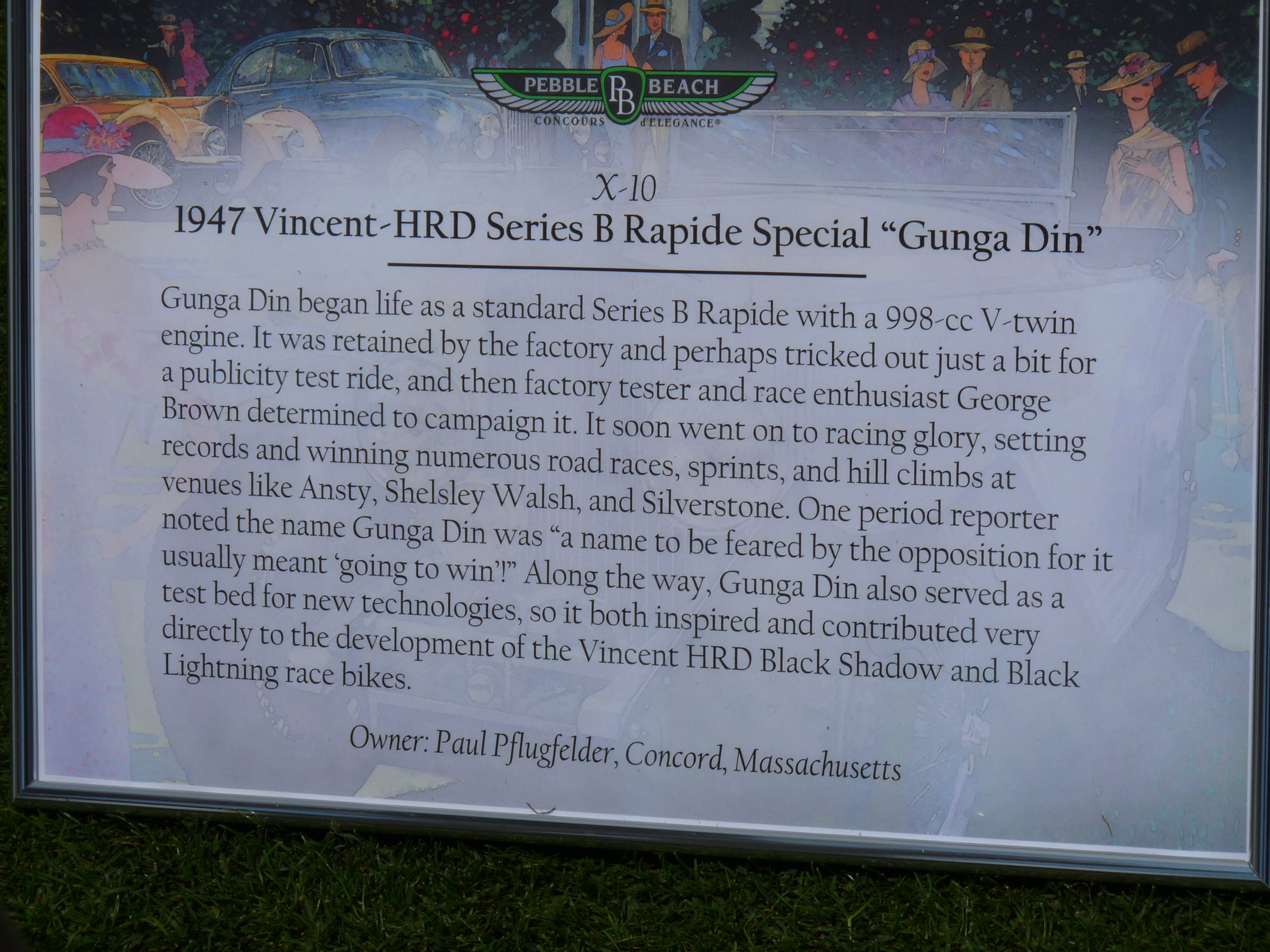
Gunga Din information plaque

Gunga Din's Vincent V-twin engine displaced the same 998 cc (60.9 cu in) as the standard Rapide's, but during the course of its active life was upgraded and rebuilt numerous times, with the bike's specifications changing steadily. The earliest rounds of internal changes included enlarged ports, triple valve springs, polished connecting rods and engine case, a lightened flywheel, and a compression ratio that had been raised from 6.8:1 to 7.3:1. The original 1 1/16-inch (27 mm) Amal carburettors were replaced by larger 1 1/8-inch (29 mm) units. These changes raised power output from 45 bhp (34 kW) to 55 bhp (41 kW).

Gunga Din was originally equipped with the Brampton girder fork front suspension used on the Series B Rapides. This unit was later replaced by a prototype of the Vincent Girdraulic front suspension. At one point during its racing career Brown switched the bike back to the Brampton fork. The rear suspension was a version of the Vincent cantilever system. Over time the bike received a new Rear Frame Member (RFM), new seat, and a different petrol tank and wheels. The bike had its mudguards cut down and stands removed.

== Motorsports ==
Gunga Din's racing debut was at Abridge. Brown won his heat but during the race the gearbox seized because it had not been filled with oil. This was followed by a second place at the Dunholme aerodrome. In 1948 Gunga Din set a new Standing Start Mile World Sidecar Record in Belgium with a speed of 94 mph (151.3 km/h). After this came several wins in the 1000 cc class at Ansty and Haddenham. A new Standing Start Mile record was set at Sandcar along with wins at the Invitation Race at Blandford, in the Unlimited class Sprint at Tartlepool and at the Shelsley Walsh hill climb. The season was crowned by a win in the class for machines of up to 1000 cc at the first ever post-war race at Silverstone.

Brown entered Gunga Din in the 1947 Isle of Man Clubman's Tourist Trophy (TT), where bike and rider managed to set fastest lap with a speed of 86.25 mph (138.81 km/h). Brown seemed headed for a win when the bike ran out of petrol. Brown pushed the bike the remaining six miles of the 37 mile track and managed to post a sixth-place finish.

When American John Edgar approached Philip Conrad Vincent (PCV) in 1948 about obtaining a bike to challenge the American speed record, PCV knew that Gunga Din had already been tuned to produce more power than the contemporary Black Shadow. Edgar was told that for the cost of a Black Shadow and a £50 premium he would have a bike that could do the job. The Edgar bike was 1B/900, the Rollie Free "Bathing Suit bike", which the factory would later refer to as the first Black Lightning.

Gunga Din made three appearances in record attempts in Belgium in 1948 and 1949. In late March 1948 Phil Irving delivered the bike to a track set up on a roadway between Antwerp and Brussels, although the bike (and rider) suffered damage on the way over to the continent.The Belgian distributor supplied parts from a factory Rapide to restore the bike to roadable condition. With registration number JRO 389 and in Black Shadow tune the bike challenged the Kilometre Lancée records for both solo and sidecar times. Ridden by Belgian racer René Milhoux, Gunga Din set new records for both classes.

In September of the same year Gunga Din returned to Belgium, but now with MkII cams, a 13:1 compression ratio, and two 32 mm Amal carburettors jetted to run on methanol. On a stretch of autobahn near Jabbeke closed for the attempt and with official timekeepers in attendance Milhoux was able to set new world records for the kilometre and mile distances with sidecar, and a new record for solo attained by a Belgian national, one day after Rollie Free had taken the American record on 1B/900.

In September 1949 both the bike and Milhoux returned to Jabbeke. On this attempt an error in marking the course distances prevented the team from officially taking anything but a new five-mile record.

Gunga Din was taken to Montlhéry in 1952 as part of a contingent of seven Vincent bikes to set new speed records. Gunga Din was there as a test mule, and did not participate in the record attempt. For the Montlhéry runs PCV had the engine crankcase replaced with one of the newer ones with "Vincent" in raised letters. The restored bike has reverted to the older-style "HRD"-labelled crankcases.

Gunga Din's final public appearance before being retired was in 1953 in Ireland, where it set a speed record of 143 mph (230 km/h). The run is said to have taken place on public roads, on the Carrigrohane straight.

Gunga Din indirectly made one other record attempt when its engine, in Black Lightning tune, was installed in the Vincent 3-wheeler prototype and driven by Ted Davis to match his earlier sidecar record during Practice Day at Snetterton Circuit. The engine blew up during the attempt and was rebuilt again, this time with a Picador-style bottom end.
