= Vincent Black Prince =

British motorcycle model

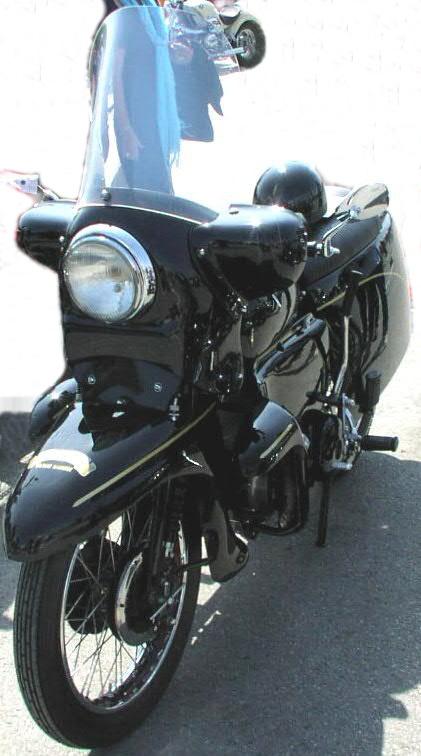
- Manufacturer: Vincent Motorcycles, Stevenage
- Production: 1954–55
- Predecessor: Vincent Black Shadow
- Engine: 998 cc (60.9 cu in) V-twin, Amal Monobloc 389 carburettors
- Power: 55 bhp (41 kW) @ 5,750 rpm
- Transmission: Four-speed
- Suspension: Front: Girdraulic oil damped Rear: cantilever monoshock
- Brakes: Front: 7 in (180 mm) dual Rear: 7 in (180 mm) single
- Tires: Front: 3.50×19"; Rear: 4.00×18"
- Wheelbase: 56.5 in (1,440 mm)
- Weight: 462 lb (210 kg) (Note: Includes 15 lb (6.8 kg) for "enclosure") (dry)

The Vincent Black Prince was a British motorcycle made between 1954 and 1955 by Vincent Motorcycles. A year before the factory closed in 1955, Vincent produced the enclosed range of Vincent Black Knight and Black Prince. Philip Vincent described it as a "two-wheeled Bentley", and the enclosed Vincents attracted a lot of attention at the November 1954 Earls Court show. Quality problems with early production of the glass-fibre mouldings necessitated a replacement supplier causing delays. The last Black Prince left the Vincent production line on Friday, 16 December 1955.

== Development ==
Falling sales of the Series C Vincent motorcycles during 1952 and 1953 was partly attributed to dated styling, so Philip Vincent sought to update the range and development began on what were to become the Series D machines. The main changes were redesigned frame components, resited oil tank, larger fuel tank, smaller diameter wheels, one-less rear brake drum, new design carburettors and updated electrics.

Black Knight and Black Prince versions were innovative in using full enclosure and weather protection, with glass fibre panels that included leg shields and a handlebar fairing. This was not about streamlining for speed, as the fairings reduced top speed by 10 mph (16 km/h), although the Vincent was already powerful enough for riders of the day – it was instead about the idea that the rider could travel to work in a suit rather than full motorcycle kit. Care was taken to ensure that the engine was still easily accessible for general maintenance, and the rear enclosure was hinged to provide access to the rear wheel and drive chain.

Vincent also tried to make it easier for the rider to get the motorcycle on to its new centre-stand by adding a huge lever on the left of the machine that could be operated from the saddle. The frame was also modified, re-siting the oil tank previously contained within the Upper Frame Member under the fuel tank, to underside of the new-design seat. A replacement single tubular strut bolted to the steering head and a single spring-damper unit replaced the twin rear shocks.

== Launch ==
The Black Prince was launched at the 1954 Earls Court motorcycle show, together with the 998 cc Vincent Black Knight and the 500 cc Vincent Victor (which never went into production as only the prototype was ever built). There was a lot of interest but much of it was critical, and the Black Prince was termed the motorcycle you either love or hate. The Motor Cycle road tested a Black Prince and concluded that it handled as well as the Vincent Black Shadow with improved fuel consumption.

== Production ==
Production of the Black Prince began in early 1955. Lucas components replaced the less reliable Miller electrical system, and better ignition – upgraded to coil and distributor – together with Amal Monobloc carburettors improved starting. The rear enclosure, which incorporated the oil tank, was hinged to allow access to the rear wheel and final drive chain. The centre stand was operated by a lever accessible from the saddle and the lower front mudguard stay served as an emergency front stand to facilitate the removal of the front wheel. Delay in delivery of the fibre-glass components from subcontractors delayed the availability of the first production bikes until early 1955. Approximately 200 of the enclosed models were built.

== Financial collapse ==
Increasingly affluent customers may have encouraged Vincent to go for a high-end luxury touring model, but at the same time high volume and very affordable small cars were flooding the market. Vincent's accountants came to the conclusion that the company was losing money on every Black Prince sold, so the last example of both the model and the marque left the production line on Friday, 16 December 1955.

== Auction record ==
A 1955 Vincent Black Prince set a new auction world record for the model at Bonham's Summer Classic Sale of Motorcycles and Motorcars in June 2014, selling for £91,100. In 2018, a Vincent Black Lightning, stated to be one of only 19 surviving, set an absolute world record for the highest-price paid for a motorcycle in an auction held by Bonhams at Las Vegas, selling for $US929,000 ($1.16 million Australian).

== See also ==
- List of motorcycles of the 1950s
