= Vincent Black Knight =

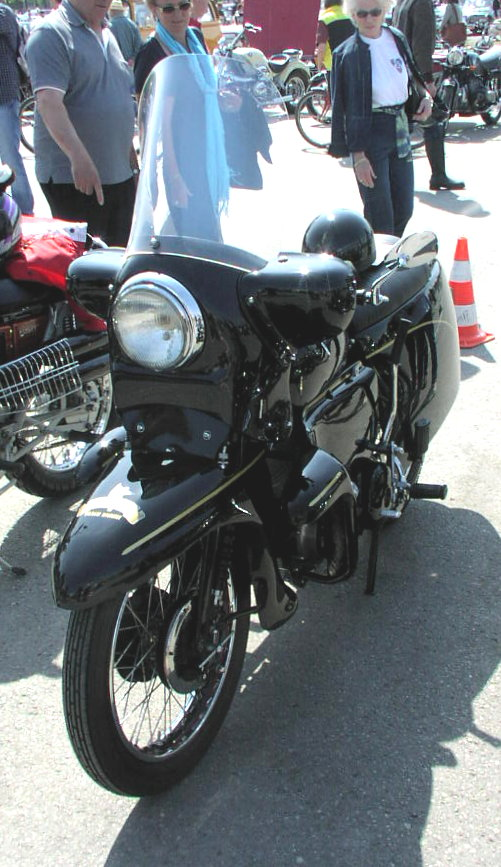
- Manufacturer: Vincent Motorcycles Stevenage
- Production: 1954–1955
- Predecessor: Vincent Rapide
- Engine: 998cc V twin
- Power: 45 bhp at 5,750 rpm
- Suspension: 'Girdraulic' oil damped (front) cantilever monoshock (rear)
- Tyres: Front tyre 3.50 x 19 in, Rear tyre 4.0 x 18 in
- Wheelbase: 56.5 inches (1,440 mm)
- Weight: 460 pounds (210 kg) (dry)

The Vincent Black Knight is a British motorcycle made between 1954 and 1955 by Vincent Motorcycles. A year before the factory closed in 1955, Vincent produced the enclosed range of Black Knight and Black Prince. Known as the 'Series D', the Black Knight was an upgraded Vincent Rapide which was fully enclosed to keep the rain and dirt from the rider. As well as allowing Vincent to reduce production costs, the enclosure actually improved performance by directing more air to the rear cylinder. Phil Vincent described it as a 'two-wheeled Bentley' and the enclosed Vincents got a lot of attention at the 1955 Earls Court show. Problems with production of the glass fibre mouldings meant that many riders removed them, which eventually led to financial difficulties and the factory closed on 16 December 1955.

== Development ==
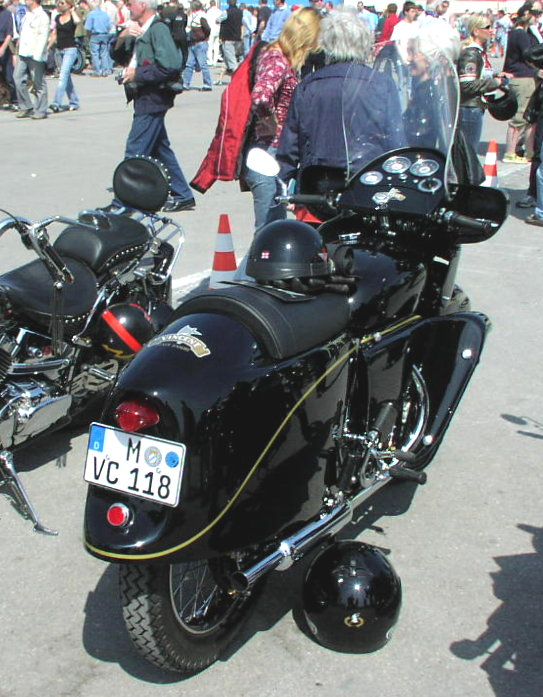
Vincent Black Knight

Falling sales of the Series C Vincent motorcycles during 1952 and 1953 was partly attributed to dated styling, so Phil Vincent sought to update the range and development began what were to become the Series D machines. The main change was innovative full enclosure and weather protection, with glass fibre panels that included leg shields and a handlebar fairing. This was not about streamlining for speed, as the Vincent was already powerful enough for riders of the day – it was instead about the idea that the rider could travel to work in a suit rather than full motorcycle kit. Care was taken to ensure that the engines were still easily accessible for general maintenance and the rear enclosure was hinged providing access to the rear wheel and drive chain.

Vincent also tried to make it easier for the rider to get the motorcycle on to its stand by adding a huge lever on the left of the machine that could be operated from the saddle and a single damper replaced the twin rear shocks. The frame was also modified with the strong steel 'backbone' was replaced with a single tubular strut bolted to the steering head (which proved much weaker).

== Launch ==
The Black Knight was launched at the 1954 Earls Court motorcycle show, together with the 998cc Vincent Black Prince (an enclosed version of the Black Shadow) and the 500cc Vincent Victor (which never went into production as only the prototype was ever built). There was a lot of interest, but much of it was critical, and the Black Knight/Black Prince models were termed the motorcycle you either love or hate.

== Production ==
Production of the Black Knight began in the spring of 1955. Lucas components replaced the less reliable Miller electrical system and ignition was upgraded to coil and distributor. The rear enclosure, which incorporated the oil tank, was hinged allowing access to the rear wheel and final drive chain. Amal Monobloc carburettors improved starting. The centre stand was operated by a lever accessible from the saddle and the lower front mudguard stay served as an emergency front stand to facilitate the removal of the front wheel. Delay in delivery of the fibreglass components from subcontractors held back the availability of the first production bikes until spring 1955. Approximately 200 of the enclosed models were built.

== Financial collapse ==
Increasingly affluent customers may have encouraged Vincent to go for a 'high end' luxury touring model, but at the same time high volume and very affordable small cars were flooding the market. Vincent's accountants suddenly realised that they were losing money on every Black Knight sold, so the last example of both the model and the marque left the production line on Friday, 16 December 1955.

== Difference from Black Prince ==
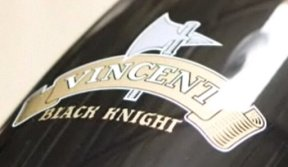

The Black Knight is easily mistaken for the very similar Black Prince. Externally, the models are nearly identical. The most readily noticeable difference is in the emblem on the front and rear fenders/wheel covers, and on the "dashboard". The emblem consists of a Vincent scroll, with the model name (Black Knight or Black Prince) below the scroll and a graphic just above the scroll. For the Black Knight, the graphic is an axe; for the Black Prince, the graphic is a helmet.

== See also ==
- List of motorcycles of the 1950s
