= Pip Harris =

British motorcycle racer (1927–2013)

- Pip Harris pictured in 1966
- Nationality: British
- Born: Peter Valentine Harris; 6 August 1927; Wombourne, Staffordshire, England
- Died: 22 February 2013 (aged 85); Bridgnorth, Shropshire, England
Motorcycle racing career statistics
Grand Prix motorcycle racing
Active years	1951 - 1960
First race	1951 Belgian Sidecar Grand Prix
First win	1960 Dutch Sidecar Grand Prix
Starts / Wins / Podiums / Poles / F. laps / Points; / 1 / 5 / N/A / N/A
Isle of Man TT career
TTs contested	11 (1954 - 1967)
TT podiums	4

Peter Valentine "Pip" Harris (6 August 1927 – 22 February 2013) was a British motorcycle racer in the sidecar class. He raced in grasstrack, hardtrack, TT and Grand Prix races over a 27-year career.

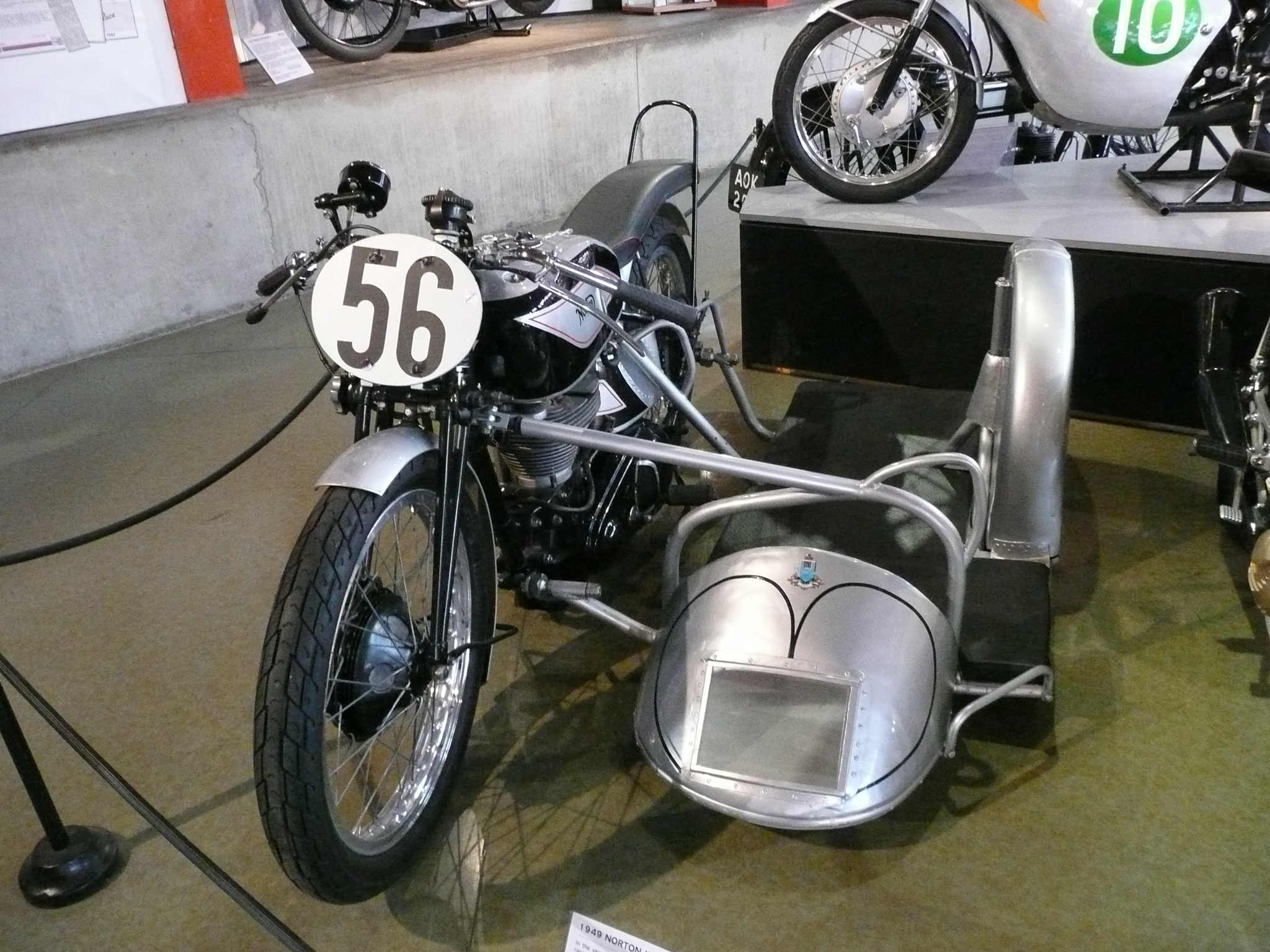
Ex-Pip Harris Norton 596cc Manx/Watsonian Racing Motorcycle Combination in the National Motor Museum, Beaulieu, 2008

== Early life ==
Born in Staffordshire, Harris followed his father H.F. Harris, known as Curly Harris, a successful AJS works rider, and his brother John, also a motorcycle racer, in their passion for motorcycles. His brother sat him on a solo bike at the age of 8, which he promptly ran into a wall, and from that moment he never looked back.

Harris left school at 15 having been informed by the headmaster that he would ‘amount to nothing’, and he began working in the family garage and taxi business, which gave him access to engines of all types.

With plenty of time to practice on bikes both with and without engines, it became apparent that due to a problem with one of his legs, Harris could not control a solo machine so his father purchased a wicker sidecar from the milkman and attached it to a pre war Grindlay Peerless. This led to Harris’s first grass-tracking event in 1945 on the aptly nicknamed Grindlay ‘Bitza’, basically a bike made up of bits of this and bits of that. Unfortunately it blew up in its first season. Undaunted, by 1948 Harris had moved on to road racing on a 596cc Norton bought from Jack Surtees, father of John. A few years later deciding he wanted something with more power he tried the 1000cc Vincent machine ‘Gunga Din’ and then a Vincent Black Lightning before returning to Norton/Watsonian.

1955 saw a change to Matchless and finally in 1958, partly due to lack of works support from Norton, Harris moved to long stroke BMW engines. At the time these machines were extremely expensive and he bought his first one as a half–share with Jack Beeton, another well-known and successful British sidecar racer.

In 1969, with the long stroke becoming uncompetitive, Harris purchased an ex-works short stroke BMW.

== Career ==
Harris started his career in grasstrack motorcycle racing at Rushmere in Shropshire. He won his first race in 1946 before becoming British Champion for seven years.

Harris first road raced in 1948 at Dunholme, a racetrack created from a former World War II airfield.

Harris competed in eleven Isle of Man TT races with four podium finishes, two second and two third places, and one fourth place.

In 1956, Harris and passenger Ray Campbell were second in the Ulster Grand Prix earning six championship points. They also recorded the fastest lap in the 1956 Dutch TT but did not finish the race.

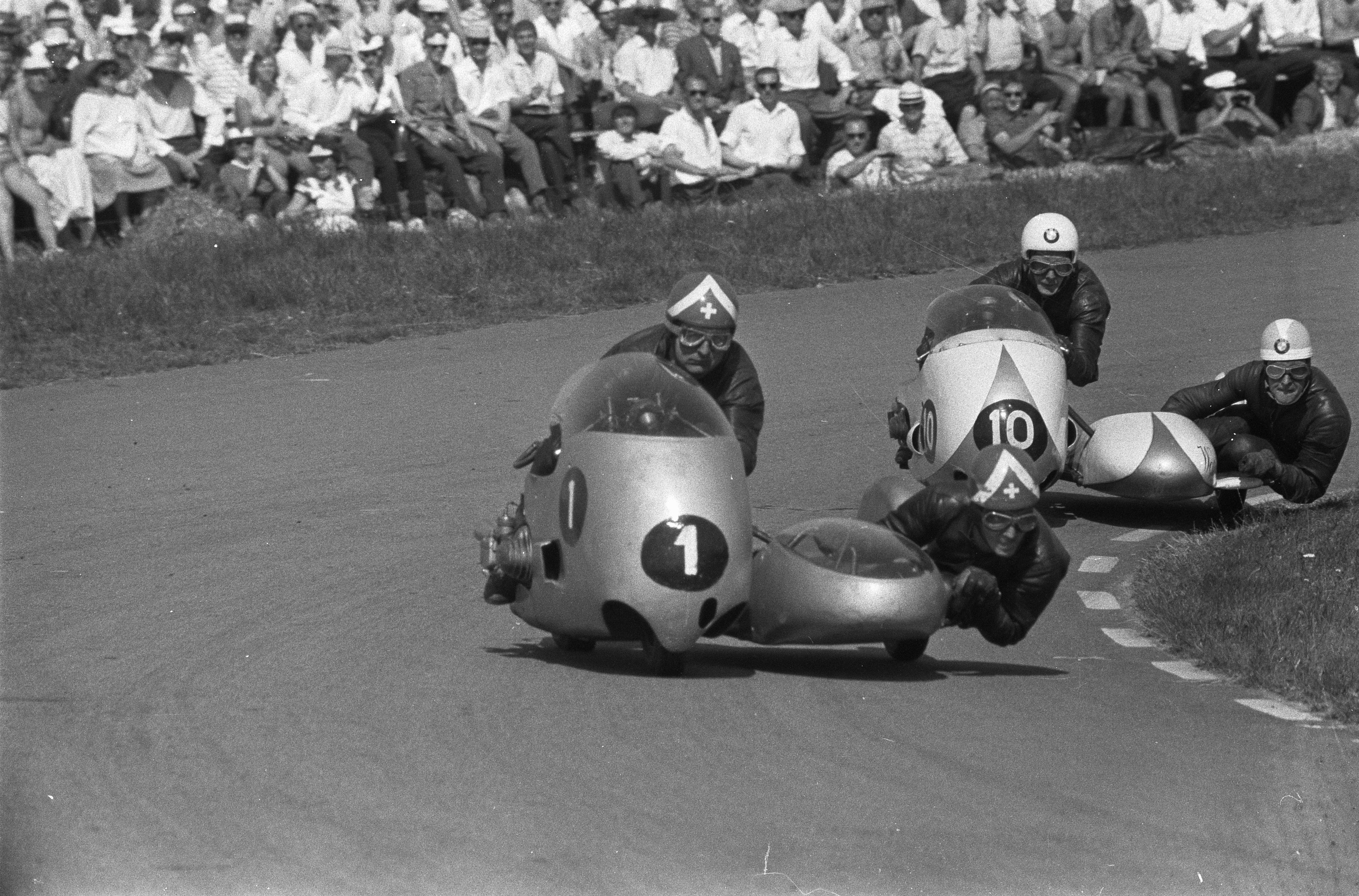
Pip Harris and Ray Campbell (No. 10) in 1960 in the Dutch TT chasing Florian Camathias and Roland Föll. Harris/Campbell won the race

His most successful race was his only Grand Prix win, in the 1960 Dutch Sidecar Grand Prix.

Harris, with others, assisted in the development of Reynolds tube leading link forks for sidecar racing, a design still used to this day. Reynolds also manufactured the framework for the new BMW engine that was used in one of the Harris combinations, a design also taken up for the works BMW of World Sidecar Champion Max Deubel.

Harris' final meeting was at his favourite British circuit, Oulton Park in Cheshire, in August 1972.

== Later life ==
Harris, and his wife Ann, retired to Ackleton, Bridgnorth. He died on the 22 February 2013 aged 85 years.
