= George Brown (motorcyclist) =

British motorcycle racer

- Born: 22 February 1912; Nottingham, England
- Died: 27 February 1979 (aged 67); Stevenage, Hertfordshire
- Occupations: Racer, tester, fabricator, sales
- Years active: 1937–1970
- Known for: Motorcycle racing, fabricating.
- Notable work: Nero, Super Nero sprint bikes.
- Spouse: Ada Brown
- Children: 2

George Brown (22 February 1912 – 27 February 1979) was a motorcycle racer, known as " the father of British sprinting". Brown raced a variety of bikes but is most closely associated with the Vincent brand. For a time he worked at Vincent, where he headed up their Experimental department and raced the factory-backed single and V-twin bikes. Brown left Vincent to establish his own motorcycle shop and as a sideline built high-performance sprint bikes that he rode to several national and international records.

== Biography ==
=== Early years ===
George Brown was born on 22 February 1912 in Nottingham, England, and grew up in Colwick, Nottinghamshire. He attended Nottingham High School and planned a career in law as a solicitor.

Brown's grandfather ran a cycle shop, and his father owned several motorcycles. Brown's father eventually bought a cycle shop in Harrow, where George spent time repairing a wide variety of motorcycles. He later inherited brother Cliff's 250 cc AJS.

At the beginning of the 1930s, Brown drove a lorry and worked for Raleigh, where his father had earlier been in the Experimental Department. In 1933, Brown went to the Vincent works at Stevenage and asked Vincent founder Philip Conrad Vincent (PCV) for a job. He was given a position in the service department, where he rebuilt second-hand bikes taken in exchange for new Vincents. By 1934, Brown had moved into the factory, where he was soon promoted to the Test and Special bike department.

In 1937, Brown lapped Brooklands at over 100 mph (161 km/h). Due to Brown's not being a member of the British Motorcycle Racing Club (BMCRC), he was denied the usual Gold Star for the feat. The bike involved may have been the first Vincent 1000 cc twin, believed to be DUR 142, at speeds of 113 mph (181.9 km/h) in wet conditions. During this period, he was also riding a 350 cc Velocette at grass track events.

=== WW II and post-war at Vincent ===
At the outbreak of World War II, Vincent shut down motorcycle manufacturing and converted to wartime production. Brown went to work for Percival Aircraft in Luton, building Mosquitos as assembly foreman. He applied to the RAF but his application was declined due to his being employed in a reserved occupation at Percival. When the war ended in 1945, Brown stayed at Percival for a while, but quickly got involved with Vincent again. After his release from war work he immediately returned to Vincent. Brown also married in 1946.

After the war, Brown was racing privately when he was approached by Joe Craig to ride a Norton at the Isle of Man TT. Brown turned him down, and the ride went to John Surtees. Vincent opened a showroom in Chesterfield in the north, and Brown worked there as sales manager for a time before returning to Stevenage.

During the 1946 racing season, Brown recorded 6 first and 5 second places on a modified Comet that was later known as the Cadwell Special. In 1947, he began racing a special Rapide that was later named Gunga Din.

Brown made his first appearance at the Isle of Man in 1948 in the Clubmans' TT. He was leading after three laps when he ran out of petrol. Brown then pushed his bike the remaining six miles, and still managed a sixth-place finish. Before running out of fuel he had set fastest lap, at 82.65 mph (133.01 km/h). Later that same year Brown crashed badly at Eppynt trying to avoid a young girl who had fallen off the banking onto the track.

In 1951, Brown was approached by AJS with an offer to ride for them, but he turned them down as he had with Norton earlier. He continued to ride Vincents in road racing and trials events.

=== Post-Vincent ===
Brown left Vincent in 1951. He started his own motorcycle business in part of a local Ford dealership. He was an agent for Francis-Barnett, Norman and Velocette motorcycles, as well as taking on special projects, such as developing a Trials bike for Norman. Brown also began building his own motorcycles for road racing and, later, for sprinting.

In his first outing at the TT after leaving Vincent in 1951, Brown placed fourth on an AJS. Returning in 1952 he placed sixth on an AJS in the Junior event and seventh on a Norton in the Senior race.

At this time, Brown expanded his business, taking over a shop across the road from the old Vincent works in the High Street in the old town in Stevenage. This was also when he became an agent for Vincent motorcycles.

In 1953, Brown was seriously injured at the Junior TT when he collided with the wreckage of Leslie Graham's MV Agusta. After this Brown essentially retired from road racing, but continued to appear in hill climbs and sprints. Brown was involved in another crash at Jersey, running into a barrier at 100 mph (161 km/h) and ending up underneath a car.

In 1958, Brown was one of the people involved in the formation of the National Sprint Association. Brown served as a vice-president until he succeeded Donald Campbell as president in 1967.

In 1961, Brown staged an attempt on the World Solo Record, then held by Albino Milani. Over two days, 19 and 20 August, Brown ran both his Nero bike and an Ariel Arrow at Thurleigh field. Brown took three British records for both standing- and flying-start kilometre on the Ariel. Avon Rubber supplied new slick tyres for Nero; the first use of such tyres in Britain. On Nero, Brown took the World Record for the Standing-start Kilometre for 1000 cc machines.

The British Drag Racing Association was formed in 1964 with Sydney Allard as president. Brown served as one of the Vice Presidents.

Brown continued to race sprints into the mid-1960s, but the Fédération Internationale de Motocyclisme (FIM) would only grant licenses to riders up to 54 years of age. Brown's ambition was to record a 200 mph (322 km/h) run on British soil. In 1966, Brown scheduled a 4-day Castrol-sponsored attempt to exceed 200 mph on a motorcycle in Britain. The runs took place at Greenham Common in Berkshire in October, one year before he would lose his racing license. During the runs several British and World records were set, but the 200 mph goal was not reached. Brown returned to Greenham Common in November for another three days of sprints, setting several new records.

Even after reaching the cut-off age for eligibility to set International records, Brown continued to race and set British records. He also campaigned to have FIM lift their 55-year age limit, writing to FIM headquarters in Geneva. FIM relented in 1968 and lifted the 55-year age limit. At the age of 56, Brown tried to exceed 200 mph at Elvington, but was unable to reach that goal.

In 1970, Brown had the first of several heart attacks. He died in Stevenage, Hertfordshire, on 27 February 1979. He was survived by his wife Ada and sons Anthony and Graham.

== Memorials ==
The George Brown Memorial Vintage Run was an event that started in 1979 and was organised by the Stevenage and District Motorcycle Club. It was renamed the Presidents’ Memorial Classic Run in 2025.

The George Brown Memorial Sprint is an event that is organised by the National Sprint Association. It was first held in 1982 at Santa Pod Raceway.

== Records held ==
Over the course of his sprinting career Brown held no less than 30 national and world speed records. These records included the following.

Title	Class	Date	Speed	Time	Bike	Location	Previous record
World standing-start kilometre	Sidecar	November 1960			Nero		
World standing-start kilometre	1000 cc	August 1961	108.73 mph (174.98 km/h)	20.573 s	Nero	Thurleigh	106.77 mph (171.83 km/h)
World standing-start kilometre	250 cc, 350 cc and 500 cc	August 1961	77.5 mph (124.7 km/h)	28.863 s	Ariel Arrow	Thurleigh	65.16 mph (104.86 km/h) (250 cc), 71.69 mph (115.37 km/h) (350 cc), 76.68 mph (123.40 km/h) (500 cc)
World flying-start kilometre	250 cc, 350 cc and 500 cc	August 1961	106.69 mph (171.70 km/h)	20.966 s	Ariel Arrow	Thurleigh	88.77 mph (142.86 km/h) (250 cc), 96.46 mph (155.24 km/h) (350 cc), 104.57 mph (168.29 km/h) (500 cc)
World standing-start kilometre British standing-start kilometre	1000 cc	June 1964	114.83 mph (184.80 km/h)	19.48 s	Super Nero	Chelveston	
British flying-start kilometre	1000 cc	June 1964	172.7 mph (277.9 km/h)	12.96 s	Super Nero	Chelveston	
British flying-start quarter-mile	1000 cc	June 1964	177.16 mph (285.11 km/h)	5.08 s	Super Nero	Chelveston	
British flying-start quarter-mile	1000 cc	August 1964	189.314 mph (304.671 km/h) (average)	4.374 s (mean)	Super Nero	Chelveston	
British standing-start kilometre	1000 cc	August 1964		10.283 s (mean)	Super Nero	Chelveston	
World standing-start kilometre British standing-start kilometre	Solo 1000 cc	5, 6, 7, 8 October 1966	116.79 mph (187.96 km/h) (average)	19.16s (mean)		Greenham Common	114.83 mph (184.80 km/h)
World standing-start kilometre British standing-start kilometre	Sidecar 1000 cc	5, 6, 7, 8 October 1966	102.01 mph (164.17 km/h) (average)	21.92 s (mean)		Greenham Common	
World standing-start ¼ mile British standing-start ¼ mile	Sidecar 1000 cc	5, 6, 7, 8 October 1966	76.22 mph (122.66 km/h) (average)	11.80 s (mean		Greenham Common	
British standing-start ¼ mile	Solo 1300 cc	5, 6, 7, 8 October 1966	80.84 mph (130.10 km/h) (average)	11.13 s (mean)		Greenham Common	
British flying-start kilometre		5, 6, 7, 8 October 1966	122.45 mph (197.06 km/h) (average)	18.26 s (mean)	250 cc Royal Enfield Special	Greenham Common	106.7 mph (171.72 km/h)
British standing-start kilometre		5, 6, 7, 8 October 1966	83.18 mph (133.87 km/h) (average)	26.89 s (mean)	250 cc Royal Enfield Special	Greenham Common	77.5 mph (124.72 km/h)
World standing-start ¼ mile		5, 6, 7, 8 October 1966	62.63 mph (100.79 km/h) (average)	14.49 s (mean)		Greenham Common	58.31 mph (93.84 km/h)
World standing-start mile British standing-start mile	Solo 1300	3, 4, 5 November 1966	114 mph (183.47 km/h) (average)	31.366 s (mean)	Super Nero Mark II	Greenham Common	105.67 mph (170.06 km/h)
World standing-start mile British standing-start mile	Solo 1000	3, 4, 5 November 1966	128.46 mph (206.74 km/h) (average)	28.032 s (mean)	Super Nero Mark I	Greenham Common	97.32 mph (156.62 km/h)
World standing-start mile British standing-start mile	Sidecar 1000	3, 4, 5 November 1966	119.086 mph (191.650 km/h) (average)	30.446 s (mean)	Super Nero Mark I	Greenham Common	105.67 mph (170.06 km/h)
World flying-start kilomotre British flying-start kilometre	Sidecar 1000	3, 4, 5 November 1966	158.238 mph (254.659 km/h) (average)	14.112 s (mean)	Super Nero Mark I	Greenham Common	
World standing-start mile British standing-start mile	Sidecar 1300	3, 4, 5 November 1966	115.915 mph (186.547 km/h) (average)	31.057 s (mean)	Super Nero Mark II	Greenham Common	
World flying-start kilometre British flying-start kilometre	Sidecar 1300	3, 4, 5 November 1966	149.732 mph (240.970 km/h) (average)	14.939 s (mean)	Super Nero Mark II	Greenham Common	
World standing-start kilometre British standing-start kilometre	Sidecar 1300	3, 4, 5 November 1966	103.439 mph (166.469 km/h) (average)	21.625 s (mean)	Super Nero Mark II	Greenham Common	97.20 mph (156.43 km/h)
British flying-start ¼ mile	Sidecar 1300	3, 4, 5 November 1966	152.840 mph (245.972 km/h) (average)	5.888 s (mean)	Super Nero Mark II	Greenham Common	128.72 mph (207.15 km/h)
British standing-start mile	Sidecar 1300	3, 4, 5 November 1966	96.404 mph (155.147 km/h) (average)	37.392 s (mean)	250 cc Royal Enfield Special	Greenham Common	
British standing-start mile	1300 cc solo	1967	128.7 mph (207.12 km/h)	26.96 s	Super Nero		
British flying-start kilometre	1300 cc solo	1967	171.68 mph (276.29 km/h)	13.03 s	Super Nero		
British flying-start ¼ mile		1968	175 mph (281.6 km/h) (average)	5.209 s (mean)	Super Nero	Elvington	
World flying-kilometre British flying-kilometre		1968	182 mph (292.9 km/h) (average)	12.285 s (mean)	Super Nero	Elvington	
World flying-mile British flying-mile	Sidecar	1970	128.234 mph (206.373 km/h) (average)	28.074 s (mean)	Super Nero	Elvington	

== Significant motorcycles ==
=== Cadwell Special ===
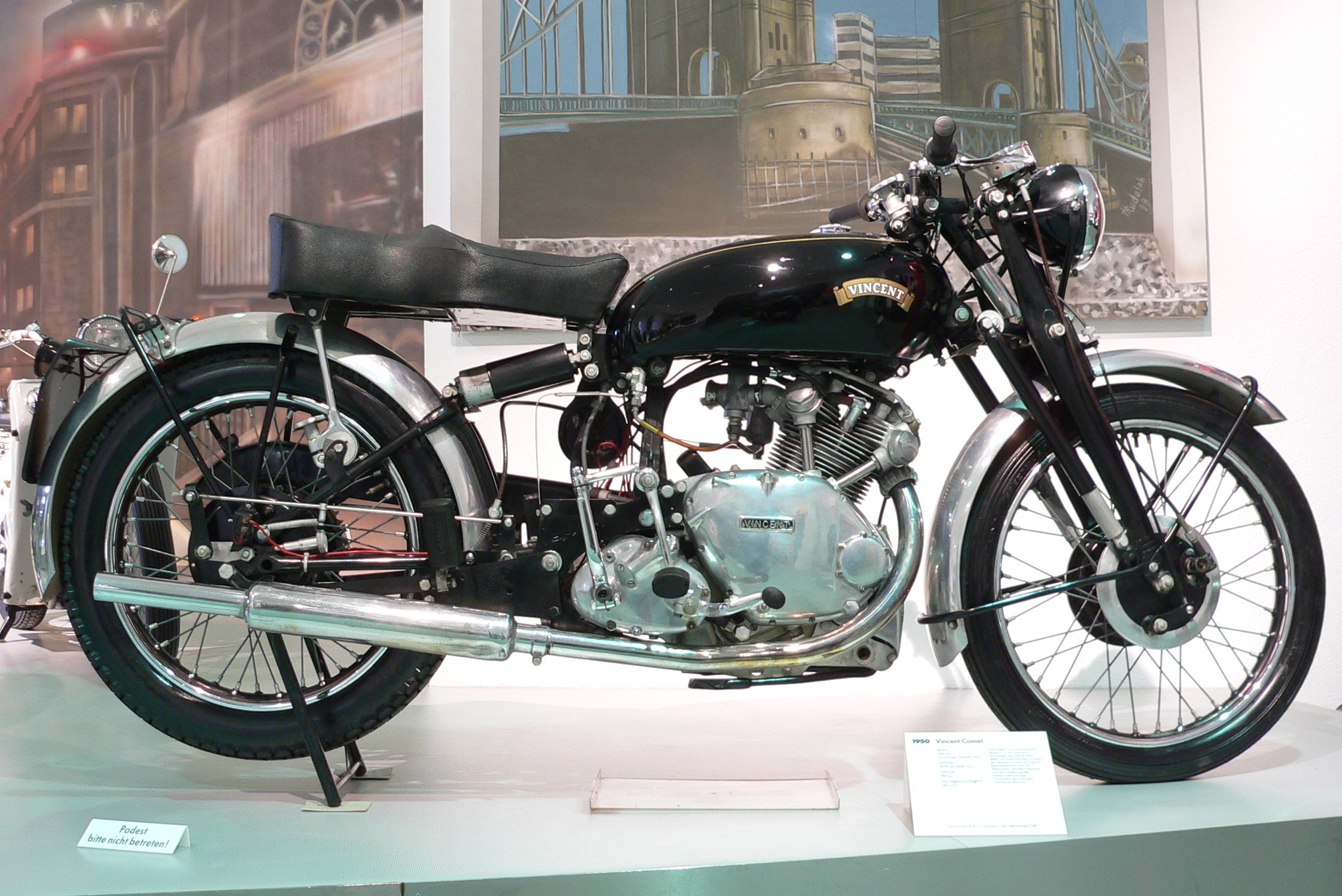
1950 Vincent Comet

In the winter of 1946/47, Brown and Vincent service foreman Norman Brewster approached PCV and proposed building a Series A Comet Special for short circuit racing until a new 500 cc model was ready. PCV agreed, but restricted them to using factory surplus parts. Brown used a Comet engine and frame with serial number TTC17 as the basis of the Special. TTC17 had earlier been ridden at Donington Park by Captain Clark. Brown and Brewster rebuilt the bike and managed to get weight down to 290 lb (131.5 kg). The bike's name came from the location of its first outing, at Cadwell Park.

Vincent designer Philip Edward Irving (PEI) was approached by the West Ham Speedway to build an engine similar to the TTC17 Cadwell unit for speedway use. PCV and PEI designed a modified engine that used a Rapide cylinder head and barrel and a Series A engine case. All of the cooling fins were sawn off the barrel and cylinder head so that the engine would warm up quickly. The first engine had a crankcase of cast Elektron metal. Eventually, the Cadwell Special itself received a Speedway engine. The Cadwell Special was sold by the factory after the Grey Flash bikes became available.

=== Gunga Din ===
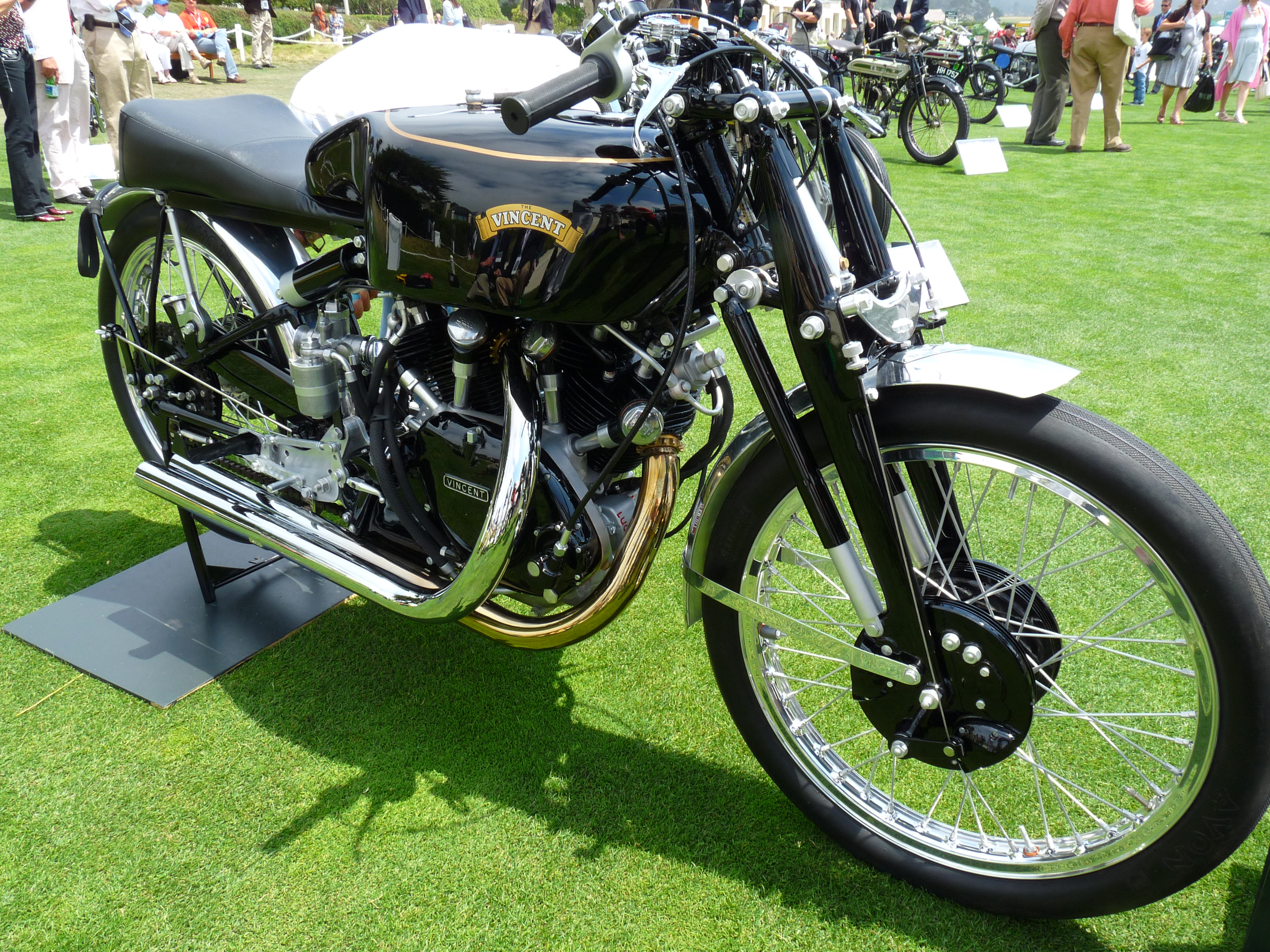
Gunga Din

PCV determined to create a racing model out of the Rapide. A rejected engine, F10AB/1A/71.1, was sent to the development department and completely rebuilt, then mounted in a frame. The bike was soon put to use as a factory racer, as well as a test-bed for performance improvements to be applied throughout the line. This bike was named Gunga Din by motor journalist Charles Markham.

=== Nero ===
Brown wanted to continue racing, and wanted to do it on a bike like Gunga Din. He located a Rapide in Mill Hill, North London that had been damaged in a crash and subsequent fire and bought it for £5. Brown and his brother Cliff rebuilt the wreck, and as they were no longer working for Vincent, were able to make any changes to the bike they wanted. Custom camshafts were made, and the compression ratio was raised to 13:1. Brown originally built the bike known as Nero to be a road-racing machine. The bike was raced in both solo and sidecar configurations.

In 1954, more obvious changes were made, when the rear swing-arm was replaced by one fabricated out of Velocette swing-arm legs and dampers by the Browns thanks to diagrams done by George Buck, a technical adviser at Vincent. The Vincent girdraulic front end and wheel were replaced by a telescopic fork and 19" wheel from an AJS Porcupine, courtesy of Jock West, AJS' sales director. With these modifications complete the bike's wheelbase was the same as a Norton featherbed; 54 in (1,372 mm). This caused the front wheel to lift under hard acceleration, so Brown lengthened the wheelbase by 2 in (51 mm).

George Brown's 1000cc Vincent Special, Nero

The bike underwent steady revision. By 1959, the compression ratio was up to 25:1, and power was approximately 85 hp (63.4 kW) at 6,800 rpm. The forks were AMC Teledraulic telescopics. The bike retained the box-section backbone chassis of the donor Rapide, and the 998 cc 47° Vee-twin cylinder layout. One year later, the bike received 1 7/32" GP carburettors. The rear end was lowered with shorter springs, and the wheelbase was stretched an additional 2½". To handle the extra power a modified Norton clutch and seven friction plates were installed.

Brown heard about a new type of tyre called a slick being used in America. He contacted Avon Tyres and had them duplicate the American product for Nero; the first use of such tyres in Great Britain.

Brown later extended the rear swing-arm another 6 in (152 mm), and extended the front rebound springs. Brown also had a streamlined fairing made for Nero; the first such use of aerodynamics on a bike in Britain. The first one built was of aluminium, and three more were made in fibreglass. They were used on both his custom bikes as well as the factory specials he also raced.

==== Nero replicas ====
Brown built three replicas of Nero for private owners.

One was built for Frenchman Marc Bellon. Bellon contacted Brown by telegram in September 1958 about modifying his personal Rapide, which he then delivered to Brown's workshop. The bike received an AJS 7R telescopic fork and conical brake in front, and a Velocette-based swing arm with Woodhead Munroe shocks in the rear. Front and rear wheels were 19" with aluminium rims. The engine remained stock. Bellon put 10,000 mi (16,093 km) on his street Nero before being called up for military duty. On his return, he found the bike in an unrideable condition, which is how it remained for 20 years. In the mid-1980s, he began a complete rebuild that included Mahle pistons, MkII cams and Alton generator. The Vincent backbone was replaced by a custom large-diameter tube and the steering head with a unit of solid billet. The restoration was completed in 1998.

One of the other Nero replicas was sold to a Scottish physician, who wanted to use it both on the street and in sprints. The other replica was sold to a shop-keeper in Eastbourne who kept it in regular road trim. Brown charged £450 for the conversions. Brown only built three, as most of his efforts then were going into building Super Nero.

=== Super Nero ===
Brown's next bike was built with the goal of taking the World motorcycle land speed record. Construction started in earnest in June 1962, and the bike was first road tested in August. The team included Brown, his wife Ada, fellow sprinter Pat Barrett, and Brown's brother Cliff, who had worked on Reg Dearden's World record challenger ten years earlier.

The bike was called Super Nero, and had a supercharged engine. To provide the forced induction, Brown obtained two 1500 cc Shorrock superchargers. The engine was a Vincent 998 cc V-twin, built to Nero specs with Picador-type ground flywheels, high-lift rocker arms and Stellite cam followers. Compression was reduced to 8:1.

The first incarnation of Super Nero used the modified Model-C Vincent frame from the original Nero, whose engine was then transferred into a new factory Model C frame. Nero's long swing-arm suspension was retained. Super Nero started racing in August. Power was estimated to be between 120 and 130 hp (89.5 and 96.9 kW). In early races it was determined that boost was too low, so sprocket ratios were changed on the blower drive to increase it. Problems encountered included misfiring magnetos and breaking primary chains.

The British Drag Association invited the American Drag Association to an exhibition series in England in 1964. American drag racers would complete with their British counterparts at six airfield tracks. Before the Americans arrived, Brown decided to revise Super Nero in 1963. A new, lower frame was built from 5/8" Reynolds 531 steel tube. The front forks for the new chassis came from a 70 cc Honda Super Cub, and were shortened further for use on the new Super Nero. The front wheel was 17" in height. The head-lug was modified to accept the Honda ball-races. Rake was 30°. The gearbox also served as the oil tank for the engine.

In 1965, Brown's brother Cliff built an experimental engine by boring out the mouth of the crankcase and having custom liners made for the barrel mouths so that the engine could be converted from 1000 cc to 1148 cc by inserting or removing the liners and installing the appropriate barrels and pistons. Brown built a special twin-coil ignition system for the bike as well. At this time, they also discovered that the cause of their chronic misfiring was due to the batteries' plates being vibrated to destruction during the high-speed runs. The customised engine was run in Nero once at Swinderby, during which a connecting rod broke and damaged the engine, after which the engine reverted to a standard crankcase.

Both Nero and Super Nero are part of the collection in the National Motorcycle Museum in Solihull, West Midlands UK.

==== Super Nero Mark II ====
Prior to the start of the 1966 racing season, another bike was built that is known as Super Nero Mark 2 (or Mark II). The tubular frame was the same as that built for Super Nero. The engine was an enlarged V-twin that displaced 1148 cc, and was supercharged as well.

Some references use the name Extra Nero, which is believed to refer to this bike.
