= Vincent Black Shadow =

Hand-built motorcycle produced by Vincent HRD

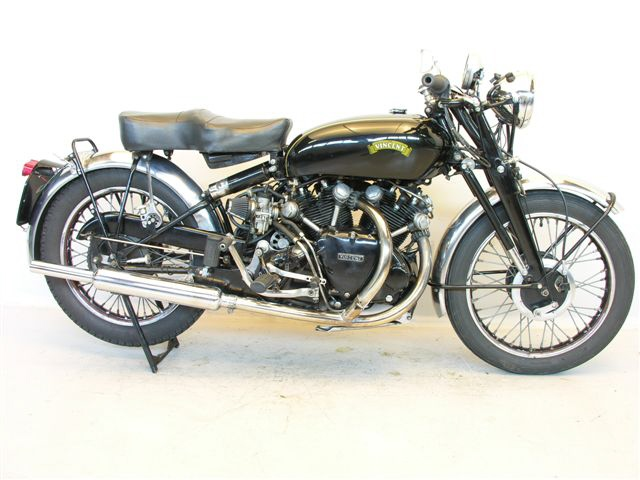
- Manufacturer: Vincent H·R·D
- Production: 1948–1955
- Assembly: England: Stevenage, Hertfordshire
- Class: Standard
- Engine: 998 cc (60.9 cu in) 50° OHV V-twin
- Bore / stroke: 84 mm × 90 mm (3.3 in × 3.5 in)
- Compression ratio: 7.3:1
- Top speed: 125 mph (201.2 km/h) (est.)
- Power: 55 bhp (41 kW) @ 5,500 rpm
- Ignition type: Lucas magneto
- Transmission: 4-speed
- Frame type: Welded box or tubular backbone
- Tyres: 3 × 20 front 3.50 × 19 rear
- Wheelbase: 56.5 in (1,435 mm)
- Seat height: 32.5 in (826 mm)
- Weight: 458 lb (207.7 kg) (dry); 500 lb (226.8 kg) (wet)
- Fuel capacity: 3.5–5 US gal (13.2–18.9 L)
- Related: Rapide, Black Lightning

The Vincent Black Shadow is a British motorcycle designed and built at the Vincent works in Great North Road, Stevenage, Hertfordshire UK. Motorcycles produced by Vincent H·R·D at their factory in Stevenage, Hertfordshire, England were renowned for their design innovation, engineering excellence and high performance. Already advertising their existing 110 mph (177 km/h) Rapide machine as "The world's fastest production motorcycle", in February 1948 the distinctive Vincent Black Shadow was announced with a top speed of 125 mph (201 km/h). Built in three different Series over the course of its life, the line continued until 1955, after which the company stopped all motorcycle production.

== Design ==
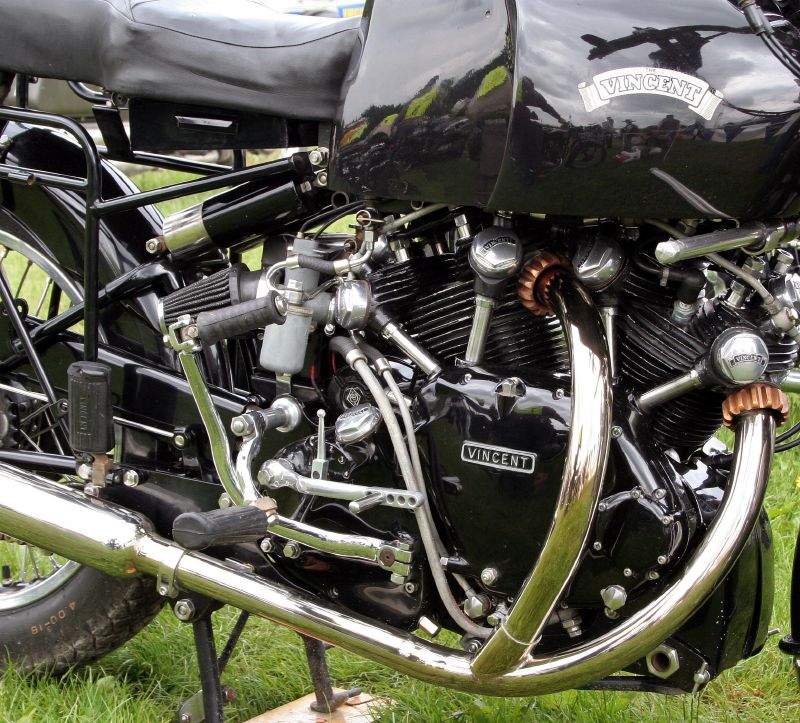
Series C engine

=== Engine and transmission ===
The Black Shadow uses a version of the air-cooled four-stroke 50° V-twin engine that powers the Vincent Rapide. Bore and stroke of the undersquare twin are 84 mm and 90 mm respectively, giving a displacement of 998 cc (60.9 cu in). Each cylinder's two overhead valves are operated through rocker arms and short pushrods by two gear-driven cams mounted high in the engine's timing case. The valves have both upper and lower guides, and the rocker arms are forked at the valve end to operate the valve by pushing on a metal shoulder part way along the length of the stem. On Series B and Series C Shadows the spark-plug for the front cylinder is on the right hand side while the one for the rear cylinder is on the left. On Series D bikes both plugs are on the right. The engine has dry sump lubrication. The electrics on Series D bikes are by Lucas This included a change to coil ignition and a DKX2A distributor.

Engines for Black Shadows were largely built out of selected Rapide production parts. The camshafts, for example, were standard Rapide units; MkIs in early examples and MkIIIs from 1952 onward. Parts were hand-selected for tighter tolerances, and airflow was improved by blending and polishing of the engine's ports. Early Black Shadows have a third inner valve spring not shared with the Rapide, but this feature was dropped from later bikes. Due to the low-octane 'Pool' petrol that was all that was available in the early post-war years, bikes of the period could have only low compression ratios. Although the prototype Black Shadow was built with a compression ratio lower than the Rapide's nominal 6.8:1, production Shadows have a ratio of 7.3:1 due to having different pistons from the Rapide, although still supplied by Specialloid. The Black Shadows have different carburettors from the Rapides, with Series B and C bikes having 1 1/8 in (29 mm) Amal 289 carburettors and Series D bikes having 1 1/8 in (29 mm) Amal Type 389/10 units.

While other contemporary motorcycles tended to be polished and chromed, founder Philip Conrad Vincent (PCV) decreed that the Black Shadow engine itself be black. The engine's signature colour was achieved by applying a "pyluminising" coating of chromate anti-corrosion primer over which a layer of Pinchin & Johnson black enamel was added. The part was then baked in an oven for 2 hours at 200 °F (93.3 °C). Although some have claimed that the black finish increased the rate of heat rejection from the engine, its main real benefit seems to have been its visual impact.

Unit construction combines the bike's engine and 4-speed Vincent transmission in a single housing. The ratio of the bottom gear was raised from 9:1 to 7.2:1

=== Frame and bodywork ===
As in the Series B Rapide, the engine is mounted as a stressed member, eliminating the need for a downtube cradle. Series B and C Black Shadows use an upper frame member (UFM) consisting of a fabricated steel box that doubles as an oil tank. On the Series D bikes the revised UFM is a simple tubular member with brazed lugs at each end bolted to a slightly modified version of the Series C malleable iron steering head casting. This revised UFM no longer carries oil and so a separate oil tank is fitted. Due to extensive use of aluminium alloy, weight for the complete bike is kept to a relatively light 458 lb (208 kg).

The standard handlebar on all models of HRDs and Vincents is the black enamelled "HRD straights". Series B and C bars are 7/8 inch (22 mm) in diameter and 25 inches (640 mm) long with the ends bent back at 20°. Series D bars are 1 1/2 in (38 mm) longer.

The Black Shadow could be had in Touring specification, and a sidecar could be fitted on either side of the bike.

The Series B and C machines do not carry any indication of the model name in their transfers, lining or badges. Beginning in 1955 on the Series D Black Shadow the figure of Mercury is joined by transfer text reading "Black Shadow".

=== Suspension ===
The rear suspension of the Black Shadow is a cantilever system, with a rear frame member (RFM) of two parallel upright triangular members pivoting from heavy plates on the back of the transmission case at the bottom and attached at the top to two spring boxes angled out from the seat post and damped by a hydraulic damper. In the Series D the RFM was redesigned with relocated spring box lugs and a new, single Armstrong spring/damper unit. These changes resulted in a 30% increase in travel to a full 6 in (152 mm).

In front the Series B Black Shadows have the same Brampton girder fork used on the Series B Rapide. A 180 lb front spring is fitted on the Series B Shadows, in contrast to the 160 lb units on the Rapide. In Series C and later Black Shadows the Brampton unit is replaced by Vincent's own Girdraulic blade-type girder variation that used a hydraulic damper in place of a coil spring. Another Series C change was the appearance of curved lugs for the seat stays.

=== Brakes, wheels, tyres ===
The brakes on Series B and Series C Black Shadows are dual 7 in (180 mm) single leading shoe (SLS) drums front and rear. Unlike the Rapide, the drums are not interchangeable front-to-rear on the Black Shadows. The Shadow drums are ribbed cast iron. The front drum has a small flange and is attached with five bolts, while the rear has a larger flange and is attached with ten bolts. The brakes use Ferodo's MR41 linings, which was new on the Shadows.

=== Instrumentation ===
The primary instrumentation on Series B and Series C Black Shadows is a Smiths chronometric speedometer that from 1949 on was a large 5 in (130 mm) unit mounted almost vertically. Speedometers on domestic models are calibrated up to 150 mph (241 km/h), while export models are fitted with a 240 km/h (149 mph) equivalent. Series D Black Shadows do not use the 5 inch speedometer but rather a 150 mph (241 km/h) version of the ordinary 3 in (76 mm) S576/L instrument.

== Model history ==
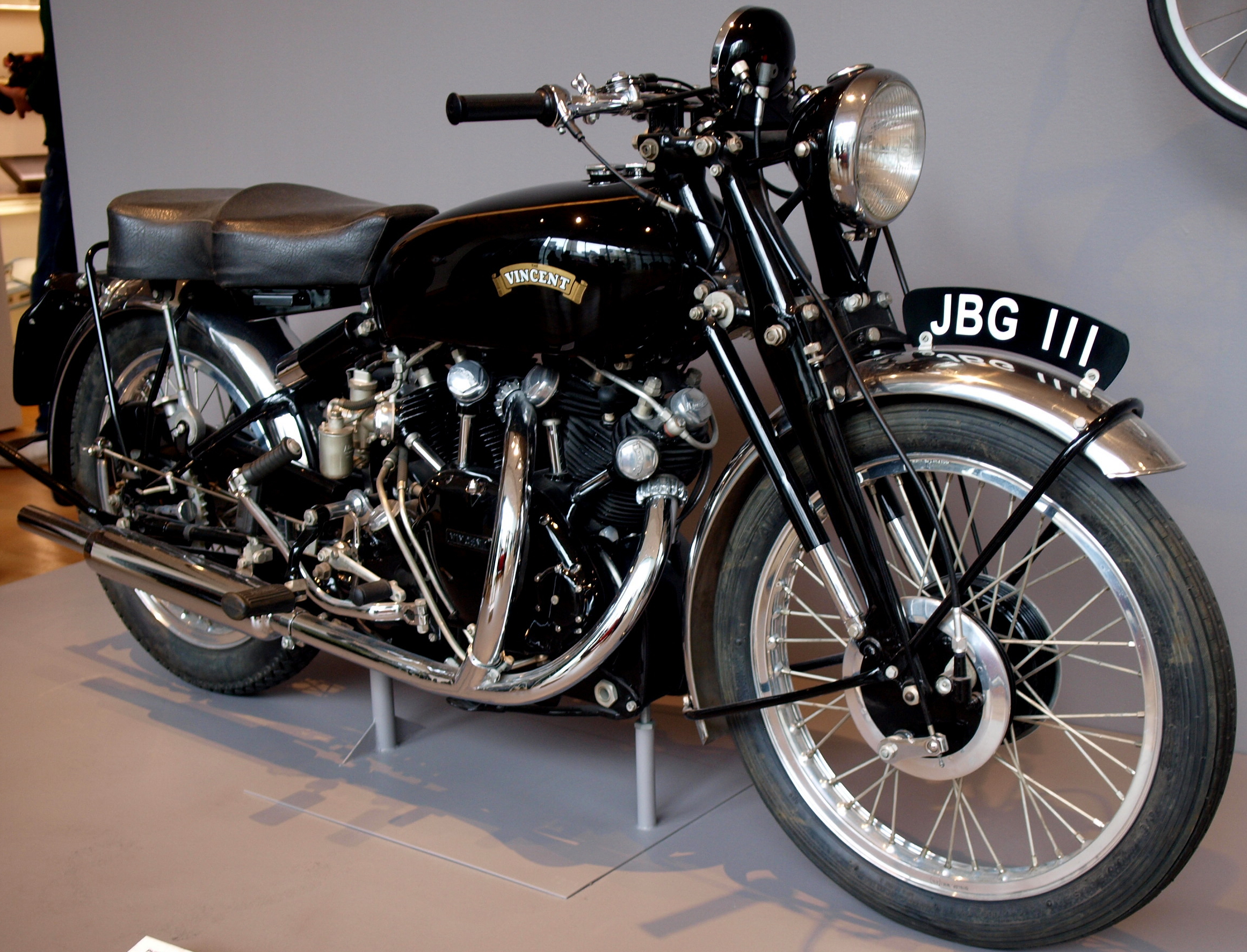
Series C Black Shadow

While the Series B Rapide was not designed to be a racer, PCV felt that steady improvement was necessary and drew up a specification for a version with greater performance. The factory had been receiving inquiries regarding tuning options that would increase performance of the existing model, and PCV believed that a new model would offer two things; an upgrade path for owners looking for more speed and increased profits for the factory. Further encouragement was provided by the racing success of factory racer and performance testbed Gunga Din.

When PCV proposed the new model to Vincent managing director Frank Walker, Walker refused to authorise development. Engineer Phil Irving and racer and Development shop head George Brown quietly built two bikes to the new specifications.

The prototype Black Shadow had engine number F10AB/1B/558 in frame R2549, and was completed on 16 February 1948. The bike was road tested by Charles Markham in Motor Cycling May 1948, during which test the bike was reported to have reached 122 mph (196 km/h).

The Black Shadow was officially introduced at the 1948 Motorcycle Show at Earls Court in London. When it was tested by the respected journal Motor Cycle in 1949, they concluded "It is a connoisseur's machine: one with speed and acceleration far greater than any other standard motor cycle; and with unique and ingenious features which make it one of the outstanding designs of all time. So far as the standards of engine performance, handling and braking are concerned – the chief features which can make or mar an otherwise excellent mount – the mighty Black Shadow must be awarded 99 out of 100 marks: 99 because nothing, it is said, is perfect".

The Black Shadows were built with the same labour-intensive hand-fitting of bearings and major engine parts that Vincent had used prior to the war. Official records say that 1,774 Vincent Black Shadows were made. Vincent also built 15 "White Shadow" models to the same mechanical specifications as the Black Shadows but with an engine that was polished rather than enamelled. White Shadow engines had a prefix of "1A/".

In 2007 the Vincent H·R·D Owners Club commissioned the VOC Spares Company Limited to build a replica Black Shadow from new parts. The goal of the project was to prove that all parts were in stock and available from the VOC Spares Company Limited. Having received glowing reviews from the motorcycle press in the UK, the machine was auctioned by Bonhams and eventually went on display at a museum in New Zealand.

Journalist Hunter S. Thompson wrote "If you rode the Black Shadow at top speed for any length of time, you would almost certainly die. That is why there are not many life members of the Vincent Black Shadow Society." The bike is mentioned several times in Thompson's 1971 novel, Fear and Loathing in Las Vegas.

== Motorsports ==
=== Bonneville 1948 ===
Black Shadow serial number F10AB/1B/900 was a specially prepared model sold to American John Edgar for the purpose of challenging the American land speed record for motorcycles. The goal was to take the AMA National Class A flying-mile record then held by Joe Petrali and his modified Harley-Davidson and which stood at 136.183 mph (219.165 km/h). The bike had to be in Los Angeles California before September 1948.

1B/900 was a factory-built racer, but as there was no plan to market such a version as a separate model when it was built, the bike began life as a Black Shadow even though it was later referred to as a Black Lightning by the factory.

Vincent mechanic Cliff Brown writes that he built a modified engine for the bike, with extensive porting and polishing and a compression ratio of 12.75:1. Brown also reports that he designed and ground three sets of prototype MkII cams for the bike. This origin of the engine is disputed by Denis Minett, head of the Special Engine Department at Vincent at the time. 1B/900 was test-ridden by Cliff's brother George, who was said to have taken the bike to over 140 mph (225 km/h) at the Gransden Aerodrome. After this the bike was shipped to Vincent dealer V.L. Margin in California.

Edgar had arranged for American Rollie Free to pilot the bike on the record attempts. Free unofficially broke the record during a test run at Rosamond Dry Lake in California with a recorded speed of 138 mph.

On 13 September 1948 Free and 1B/900 appeared at the Bonneville Salt Flats in Utah, USA. On his first run Free set a new record for naturally aspirated motorcycles of 148.6 mph (239.1 km/h). Free then stripped off his racing leathers and on his final run, lying prone on the fender of the bike, set a record speed of 150.313 mph (241.905 km/h). A picture taken during this run earned this motorcycle the name "the bathing suit bike".

On the basis of this run Vincent's subsequent advertising used the slogan "The world's fastest standard motorcycle: This is a FACT – NOT a Slogan!"

=== Montlhéry 1952 ===
With support from the Wakefield Oil Company, owners of the Castrol brand, Vincent took seven bikes to Montlhéry France in 1952 to challenge a variety of endurance records, the 100 mph (161 km/h) for 24 hours record in particular. The bikes included four Black Shadows, one Black Lightning and Gunga Din. An additional Black Shadow served as a test hack and did not participate in the record runs.

The four Black Shadows were two pairs of consecutively numbered machines, transported to Montlhery from the Stevenage factory on a Lorry.

The Black Lightning was used with the intention of breaking the shorter high speed records. This machine was initially dispatched to a London dealership previously to the record attempt, however did not sell. This Lightning was returned to the factory, where it was prepared for the Montlhery World Record attempts.

Gunga Din was also used for the high speed record attempts in addition to the Black Lightning. Both the Lightning and Gumga Din were transported to Montlhery in Vincent's K8 Austin van.

The hack bike, registration NRO365, was ridden from the Vincent factory to Montlhery. This Black Shadow was used as a practise bike and was not used in any record attempt.

The record attempts started on 13 May 1952 and continued for three days. The motorcycles faced unusually high temperatures at the track that year. Big end failures put an early end to the attempt but several records were achieved including the 6 Hours and 1000 Kilometres by a Black Shadow.

== See also ==
- List of motorcycles of the 1940s
- List of motorcycles of the 1950s
