= HRD Motorcycles =

British motorcycle manufacturer

HRD Motors Ltd
- Industry: Motorcycle manufacturer
- Founded: 1924
- Defunct: 1928
- Fate: Liquidation
- Successor: Vincent HRD
- Headquarters: England

HRD Motors Ltd was a British motorcycle manufacturer in the 1920s. It was founded by Howard Raymond Davies. He had worked in motorcycling, and had raced with some success in the mid-twenties, but often not finishing due to unreliability. This inspired him to build a reliable performance motorcycle, using the advertising slogan "Built by a rider". Others also aimed at a similar market, like George Brough of Brough Superior motorcycles.

After the First World War many motorcycle makers assembled their machines from engines and other major components sourced from different manufacturers. Davies' goal was to build a superior motorcycle from the best components available.

Motorcycles were produced from 1924 to 1928, but the undercapitalised company, although having a reputation for performance, struggled to survive, and was ultimately sold to OK-Supreme, who then sold the name and goodwill to Phil Vincent, a motorcycle designer. The name was then incorporated into a new company, The Vincent HRD Company Ltd.

== HRD Production History ==
=== 1924 ===
In 1924, with E J Massey, the first HRD motorcycles were built. Motors were sourced from JA Prestwich Industries Ltd (JAP), close ratio gearboxes from Burman, forks from Druid or Webb, chains from Renolds, oil pumps from Pilgrim, and carburettors from Binks. The bikes targeted the more affluent among the mechanically minded, with sporting performance and quality components.

- 1924 Models
- HD90 – 500 cc JAP racing engine – 90 mph (140 km/h) – 90 guineas
- HD80 – 350 cc JAP OHV double port – 80 mph (130 km/h) – 80 guineas
- HD70 – 350 cc JAP OHV – 70 mph (110 km/h) – 70 guineas
- HD70 S – 500 cc JAP sports sidevalve – 70 mph (110 km/h) – Solo: 66 guineas, Sidecar: 83 guineas

=== 1925 ===
In 1925 Davies rode his own motorcycles at the Isle of Man TT, coming second in the Junior and winning the Senior. This brought in orders, but while appearing successful the firm was losing money. The first premises were too small, so they had to enlarge, but were undercapitalised. There was always a waiting list, but only small numbers were produced. In September Bert le Vack set a speed record of 104.41 mph (168.03 km/h) on an HRD at Brooklands.

- 1925 Models
- HD Super90 – 500 cc JAP twin port engine – 100 mph (160 km/h) – 98 guineas

=== 1926 ===
In 1926 the opposition at the TT were faster, and the best placing for HRD was fifth. The model range was broadened, but production didn't meet demand. A general strike inflicted more financial damage.

- 1926 Models
- HD75 – 500 cc Jap OHV engine – 75 mph (121 km/h) – 75 guineas
- HD 600 De Luxe – 600 cc JAP sidevalve – 72 guineas
- HD65 – 350 cc JAP OHV – 65 mph (105 km/h) – 65 guineas
- HD60 – 350 cc JAP sidevalve – 60 mph (97 km/h) – 60 guineas
- The HD Super 90 gained the option of a 600 cc JAP OHV motor, raising the price by 5 guineas.

=== 1927 ===
In 1927 Freddie Dixon took first place in the Junior TT, and sixth in the Senior for HRD. Despite this victory, the financial situation worsened.

== Sold to Vincent ==
In January 1928, the company entered voluntary liquidation. It was bought by Ernest Humphries (of OK Supreme Motors), who sold the name, tooling and patterns to Philip C Vincent for £450 in May, 1928. Vincent subsequently formed The Vincent HRD Company later that year.

== See also ==
- List of motorcycles of the 1920s
