= Vincent Rapide =

Line of motorcycles produced by Vincent HRD

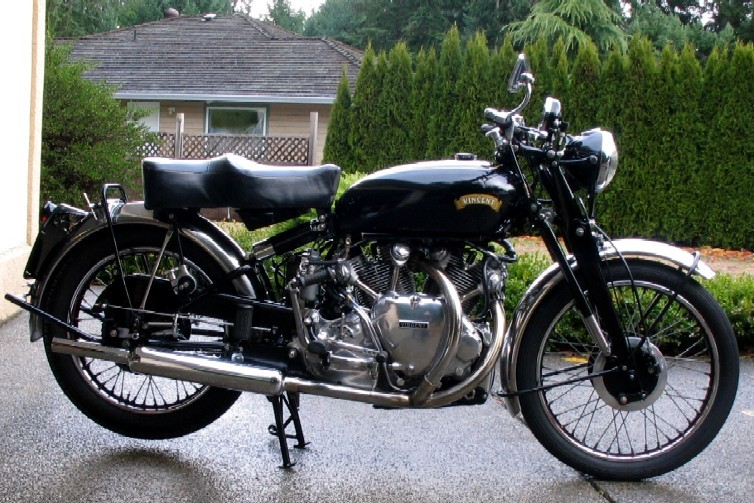
- Manufacturer: Vincent HRD Co., Ltd
- Production: 1936–55
- Assembly: England: Stevenage, Hertfordshire
- Class: Standard
- Engine: 998 cc (60.9 cu in) OHV, air cooled, pushrod V-twin
- Bore / stroke: 84 mm × 90 mm (3.3 in × 3.5 in)
- Top speed: 110 mph (177.0 km/h)(est)
- Power: 45 hp (33.6 kW) @ 5200 rpm
- Transmission: 4-speed
- Frame type: diamond Series A box section backbone Series B, C tubular backbone Series D
- Suspension: cantilever rear Brampton girder fork or Vincent Girdraulic front
- Brakes: dual 7 in (180 mm) single leading shoe (SLS) drums front/rear
- Wheelbase: 58 in (1,500 mm) Series A 56.5 in (1,440 mm) Series B, C, D
- Weight: 430 lb (200 kg) Series A 458 lb (208 kg) Series B, C, D (dry)
- Fuel capacity: 3.75 imp gal (17.0 L; 4.5 US gal)
- Oil capacity: 1/2 imp gal (2.3 L; 0.6 US gal) Series A 6 imp pt (3.4 L) Series B, C 5 imp pt (2.8 L) Series D
- Related: Vincent Black Shadow, Vincent Black Lightning

The Vincent Rapide is a line of standard motorcycles designed and built by the Vincent HRD motorcycle company at their works in Great North Road, Stevenage, Hertfordshire, England. The model debuted in 1936 and was built until 1939. Production resumed in 1946 and ended in 1955. Four major versions were built, labelled Series A through D (The Series D designation was never officially used by the factory).

== Origin of the Vee-twin ==
Whilst working in his office at Stevenage in 1936, designer Phil Irving noticed two drawings of the Vincent HRD engine laying on top of each other in a "V" formation. Irving realised that the 23½° rearward set of the engine's idler would allow a 1-litre 47° V-twin engine to be built using the same cylinders, heads and valve gear as the Vincent single. The new crankcase could even be built on the existing jigs. When company owner Phil Vincent saw the drawing he was immediately enthusiastic, and a few weeks later the first Vincent thousand had been made, with Meteor upper engine parts mounted on new a crankcase. This first Vincent V-twin engine was installed in a frame originally built for a record attempt by Eric Fernihough, who no longer required it.

== Series A ==
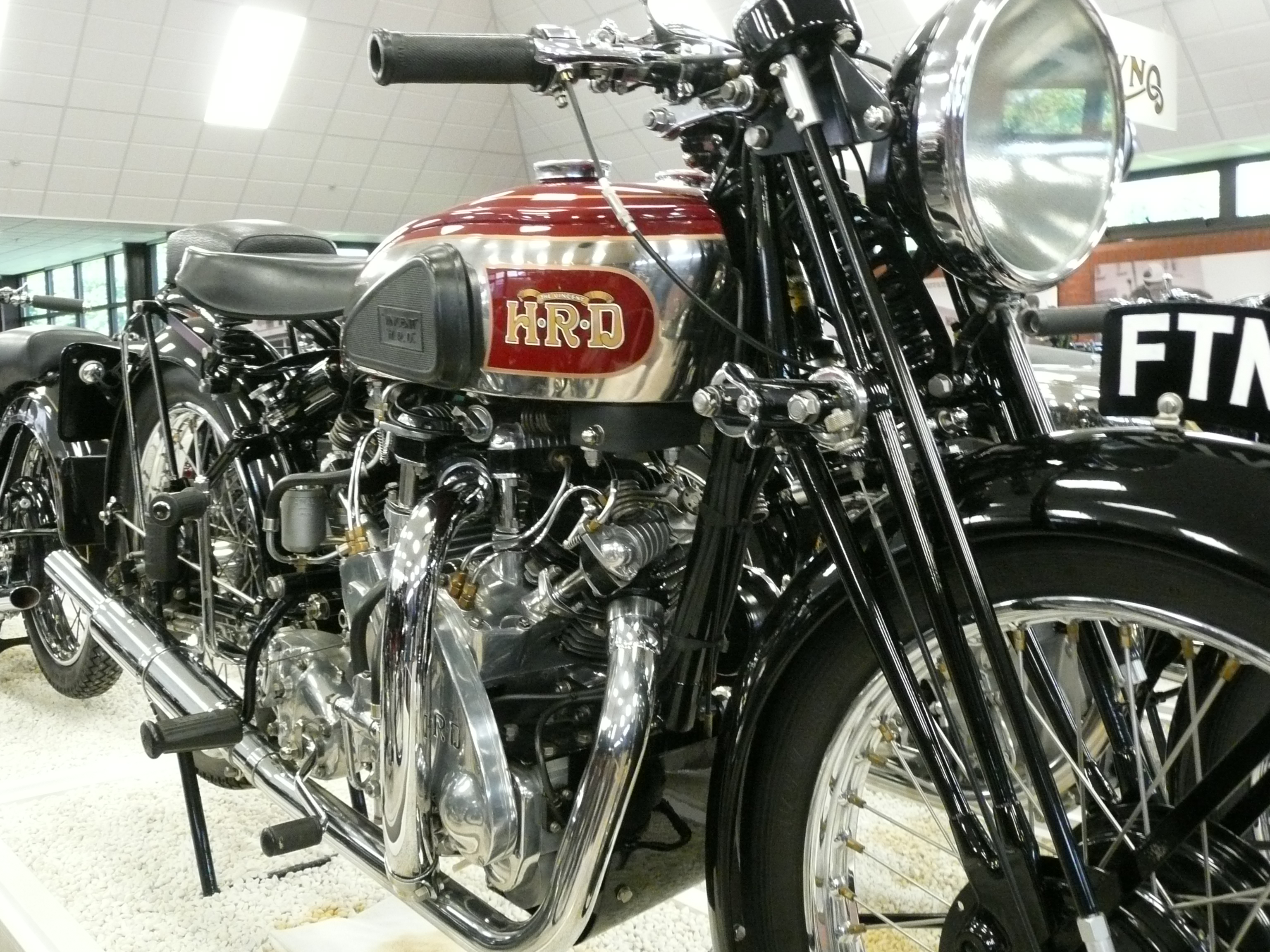
Vincent Rapide Series A (1939)

The Series A Rapide was the first production Vincent to receive the V-twin engine. The bike's frame was a version of the brazed-lug-and-steel-tube diamond frame used by the Comet, but lengthened to accommodate the longer V-twin engine. The rear suspension was based on the cantilever system patented by Phil Vincent while at Cambridge. Comprising a rear frame member (RFM) of two upright triangular arms pivoting at the bottom of the frame and attached to two spring boxes and damper at the top, this system had been used on all Vincents from the first Vincent Special prototype built in 1927. Front suspension was the same friction-damped Brampton girder fork used on the Vincent singles. The larger engine intruded into the space previously occupied by the oil tank, so the Series A Rapide received a petrol tank with two fillers – one for petrol and one for oil as the tank was made to serve double duty. Brakes were dual 7-inch (180 mm) single-leading shoe (SLS), front and rear. The bike came equipped with a side stand. The final wheelbase was 58 in (1,473 mm) and dry weight was 430 lb (195.0 kg).

The engine was an air-cooled 47° V-twin with overhead valves operated by rocker arms and short pushrods driven by two camshafts mounted high in the engine's timing case. With a bore of 84 mm and stroke of 90 mm, total displacement was 998 cc (60.9 cu in). These measurements would not change throughout the engine's production life. The air/fuel mixture was delivered by two Amal 1 1/16" carburettors. Lubrication was by a dry sump system that used an external gear-type oil pump running at one-quarter engine speed to supply oil to the big ends and outer camshaft bushes. Four external 5" long pipes delivered oil to the rocker bushes and rear of each cylinder. With a 6.8:1 compression ratio, the Series A engine produced 45 hp (34 kW) @ 5500 rpm, and was capable of 110 mph (177.0 km/h).

As was the case with the Vincent singles, the transmission in the Series A was a separate 4-speed unit supplied by Burman with a triplex chain primary drive, but with heavy-duty internals and a different wet multiplate clutch. Even with these changes the transmission was unable to cope with the output of the big V-twin. Riders were advised to not open the throttle fully until the clutch was fully engaged.

The Rapide was first shown at the 1936 Motorcycle show at Olympia. It quickly earned two sobriquets. Bill Clarke nicknamed it `The Snarling Beast’ and a reporter struck by the mass of external pipework dubbed it `the plumber’s nightmare’. The bike was listed for sale at £142.

Production of the Series A Rapide ended in 1939.

== Series B ==
Design of a radically revised Series B Rapide took place during World War II, and the bike went into production in 1946. Unit construction allowed Vincent to combine the engine and gearbox into a single casing. Philip Vincent summarised his frame design philosophy in his memoirs, writing "What isn't present takes up no space, cannot bend, and weighs nothing — so eliminate the frame tubes!" The angle between the cylinders was changed from the 47° of the Series A engine to 50° to allow the engine to be installed as a stressed member. This enabled Vincent to reduce the frame to an upper frame member (UFM) that was a steel box-section backbone that doubled as an oil tank, and to which the front headlug and rear suspension were attached. The engine's oil supply lines were now internal, and the engine used an inline felt oil filter instead of the metal gauze of the Series A. The transmission was a Vincent design.

The 56.5-inch (1,440 mm) wheelbase was 1.5 in (38 mm) shorter than the Series A, and its dimensions were closer to contemporary 500 cc bikes. The front and rear suspensions were unchanged, being a Brampton girder fork at the front and a cantilever system at the rear, although a hydraulic shock absorber and spring assembly later replaced the original twin springboxes and friction damper. Brakes remained dual single-leading shoes (SLS), front and rear.

The rear seat was supported by a sub-frame down to the rear frame pivot point, providing a semi-sprung seat with 6 inches (150 mm) of suspension. The Series B had a Feridax Dunlopillo Dualseat, and a tool tray under the front.

Vincent used quickly detachable wheels, making wheel and tyre changes easier. The rear wheel was reversible, and different size rear sprockets could be fitted for quick final-drive ratio changes. The brake and gear shift were adjustable for reach to suit individual feet. The rear mud guard was hinged to facilitate the removal of the rear wheel.

== Series C ==
The 1948 Series C Rapide differed from the Series B primarily in its front suspension. By this time Vincent believed that the Brampton fork had outlived its value, but they had resisted adopting the increasingly common telescopic forks, feeling that they were not sufficiently rigid in torsion, did not offer enough adjustment, and did not handle well when ridden hard when a sidecar was attached. The replacement was a new Vincent design called the Girdraulic fork.

The Girdraulic fork was similar in principle to the girder fork. The lower blade was of forged steel, while the upper blade was of heat-treated alloy (L40 or RR56) forged by the Bristol Aircraft Company. The forks pivoted on spindles of ground 40 ton steel. Long coil springs ran beside each blade from the fork ends to eccentric members in the bottom links. Jounce and rebound were controlled by a centre-mounted hydraulic damper.

During the Korean War nickel chrome steel was officially regulated, meaning the correct materials for some components (e.g. gears) was not available. Some motorcycles built during this period had black rims.

The company discontinued use of the HRD monogram in 1950. The logo now simply read The Vincent. Cast parts had "Vincent" in raised letters.

== Series D ==
The "Series D Rapide" appeared in 1954. While the Series D designation was never officially used by the factory, the extensive differences between these bikes and the Series C Rapides have earned them their own classification.

The Series D used a modified RFM with relocated spring box lugs and a new single Armstrong spring/damper unit that increased suspension travel by 30% to a full 6 in (152 mm). The previous box-section UFM was replaced by a simple tube with brazed lugs at each end bolted to a slightly modified version of the Series C malleable steering head casting. This revised UFM did not carry any oil, and so a separate tank was added. A change of the rear subframe brought a new seat support, which freed the passenger footpegs from the swingarm-connected-seat struts of the Series B and C models.

The Series D had only a single, sprocket-side rear brake. The drum was of ribbed cast iron. Tire sizes grew, being fitted with 3.5 in (89 mm)-19 in (483 mm) front and 4.00-18in rear wheel sizes instead of the 3 in (76 mm)-20 in (508 mm) front and 3.5 in (89 mm)-19 in (483 mm) rear tyres standard for Series B and C bikes. Series D electrics were provided by Lucas A coil ignition system was also fitted.

The Rapide line ended in December 1955, after which Vincent stopped all motorcycle production.

== See also ==
- Vincent Motorcycles
- List of motorcycles of the 1940s
- List of motorcycles of the 1950s
