= Phil Irving =

Australian engineer and author

Philip E Irving
- Phil Irving on the 1949 prototype 'Vindian', an American Indian rolling chassis fitted with an English Vincent Rapide engine
- Died: 1992 (aged 88–89)
- Occupations: Engineer, designer
- Known for: Velocette and Vincent motorcycle engineering

Philip Edward Irving (1903–1992) was an Australian engineer and author, most famous for the Repco-Brabham Formula One and Vincent motorcycle engines. He also worked at Velocette motorcycles, twice and designed the engine of the 1960 EMC 125cc racer.

== Early life ==
Irving was the son of a medical doctor who had a 600 square-mile practice in Western Victoria which he travelled around using a Swift car and two motorcycles, a belt-drive Triumph and a four-cylinder FN. Due to a lack of local repair facilities, Dr. Irving performed all the maintenance at home.

After three years of attendance at Wesley College, Phil Irving obtained a scholarship to Melbourne Technical College, where he studied a diploma course in Mechanical and Electrical Engineering where he designed and partially made his first engine, a small air-cooled two-stroke. He didn't finish the course or the engine, leaving early on the strength of his college studies and accomplishments to take his first job.

== Working career ==
Irving's first engineering job started in 1922 working for the Australian engineer Anthony Michell at the firm of Crankless Engines Ltd in Fitzroy, Victoria. At the firm worked under both Michell and engineer T.L. Sherman. Irving said: "It was the greatest stroke of luck imaginable that I started working under two such eminent men...".

Between 1926 and 1929, Irving jointly owned and operated a motorcycle workshop in the regional town of Ballarat, Australia, with Ken Granter. As the economic climate harshened in 1929, business at the shop slumped and it was forced to close. A historic plaque commemorates the former location of the workshop at 28 Doveton Street, Ballarat in Victoria.

In 1930, he left Australia and travelled to Britain as pillion passenger and mechanic to John Gill, a Scottish engineer, on the return-leg of Gill's World motorcycle and sidecar journey from UK to Australia and back, using a 600 cc sidevalve engined Vincent HRD, giving press-exposure to the business.

On arrival in UK Irving obtained employment at Velocette as a design and production engineer working on metallurgy, developing pioneering techniques to form aluminium castings around the cast-iron barrels used for the motorcycle engine cylinders.

Just before the 1931 British motorcycle show - traditionally held late in the year to showcase the manufacturers' next MY (model year) range – Philip Vincent offered Irving work at his business in Stevenage (alongside engineer E.J. Massey from the original HRD company) where they commenced a lifelong friendship.

Irving had two stints working for Vincent; in the early thirties and from 1943 when he worked at Stevenage as Vincent's Chief Engineer.

From 1937 to 1942 he again worked for Velocette at their Hall Green Factory in Birmingham, where he designed and patented a number of features including the famed rear suspension adjustment used on the post war spring-frame Velocettes. It was also used on the LE Velocette, a motorcycle he sketched during his war years at the company. Irving also designed the prototype Model 'O' Velocette, a shaft-drive twin cylinder machine of 600cc capacity and loosely based on the supercharged 500cc racing machine known as 'The Roarer'.

In 1942 he moved to London and worked with Joe Craig at Associated Motor Cycles Ltd at Plumstead.

In July 1943 Philip Vincent wrote to him and invited him to return to the Vincent HRD company at Stevenage to develop the opposed piston two stroke engine to be fitted to the eleven man airborne lifeboat.

Irving remained in UK until 1949 when he returned home to Australia, after the Vincent motorcycle business was put into receivership under Mr C E Baillie.

During the 1930s and 40s, Phil Irving wrote a technical column in Motor Cycling magazine under the pseudonym 'Slide Rule' some of which were later reprinted in book form as Motorcycle Technicalities. Amongst the other books he authored are Tuning For Speed, Motorcycle Engineering and his autobiography, Phil Irving – An Autobiography.

In 1952 a Vincent Lightning engine was acquired from British racing driver Ken Wharton and fitted by Irving to Reg Hunt's special racing car, which was similar to a Cooper called the ‘Flying Bedstead’, at Hunt's residence in Elsternwick Victoria with the assistance of Dick Boardman, a draftsman working with Irving, who was at the time Chief Engineer of the Chamberlain Group of companies, which included the Rolloy Piston Co. Port Melbourne. After a victory in the same year for the car in the Formula 2 event at Woodside, South Australia, the Vincent motor was fitted with a supercharger and tuned for Hill climb events by Irving. With Irving and Boardman as pit assistants, the car's notable successes were fastest time of the day at the Rob Roy Hill climbs in 1952 and 1953. On the second run in 1953, Hunt was awarded the year's Australian Hill Climb Championship.

At the 1960 Isle of Man TT Races, Dr. Josef Ehrlich, the owner of Ehrlich Motor Cycles (EMC Motorcycles) commissioned Irving to 'reverse-engineer' an MZ 125cc racing engine supplied by Ehrlich and to produce the working drawings of a water-cooled variant which became the 1961 EMC 125cc water-cooled single-cylinder racing engine.

At the end of 1963, Irving was approached by Jack Brabham to design a simple, lightweight, and powerful 3-litre V8 engine for the upcoming change in Formula One engine specifications due for 1966. This engine was built around the 3.5-litre Oldsmobile V8 cylinder block design and became known as the RB620. It incorporated some 'off-the-'shelf' technology such as Vincent valve inspection caps and BSA 500cc Gold Star cam profiles. Jack Brabham won the 1966 Formula 1 Driver's Championship and the Manufacturers' Championship using this engine.

In 1949, Irving became vice-president of the Vincent H.R.D. Owners Club and continued in that role until the death of Phil Vincent in 1979 when he rose to President (an honorary title). Irving held the presidency until his death on 14 January 1992.

Irving was awarded an MBE (Member of the Order of the British Empire) in the Queen's 1976 New Year Honours List for his "services to automotive engineering". His award was announced in the Supplement to The London Gazette dated 31 December 1976.

== Later life ==
In later life, Irving lived permanently in Australia based at Warrandyte, on the outskirts of Melbourne, where he had a small workshop. He never stopped his practical involvement with engines and especially with Vincent motorcycles. Just a few weeks before his death and aged 89 years, he was still working on Harley Davidson motorcycles at Midwest Harley in Ballarat, Australia. Its owner Ken James said: "You can't stop Phil; he just needs to be around engines and make them sing".

Irving's life was devoted to his passion for motorcycles and motor racing. An Australian business KH Equipment Pty. Ltd continues to build and improve on the Vincent concept using the name Irving Vincent in Hallam, Victoria, Australia.

To honour Irving's 'great achievements', the Confederation of Australian Motor Sport named its highest engineering award the Phil Irving Award, conferred on an individual Australian engineer or Australian engineering company demonstrating outstanding skills and achievements when contributing to competitive motor sport. One of the recipients was race car engineer Ron Tauranac in 2003.

There is also a Phil Irving Trophy motorcycle race held at Phillip Island during its annual Island Classic race meeting.

== Published books ==
- Irving, P.E. (1986) [1948]. Tuning for Speed (6th ed.). Menoshire. ISBN 978-0-908031-29-0.
- — (1961). Motorcycle Engineering (1st ed.). Temple Press.
- — (1962). Automobile Engine Tuning. London: Temple Press Books.
- — (1967). Two-Stroke Power Units. London: Newnes.
- — (1976). Rich Mixture: A Motorcycle Miscellany. Australia: Research Publications.
- — (1977). Black Smoke. Australia.
- — (1979). Restoring & Tuning Classic Motorcycles.
- — (2004) [1983]. Motorcycle Technicalities. Turton & Armstrong Pty. ISBN 978-0-908031-82-5.
- — (1992). Phil Irving – An Autobiography. Turton & Armstrong Pty. ISBN 978-0-908031-49-8.

== See also ==
- Brabham
- Vincent Motorcycles
- Phil Vincent
- Vincent Rapide
- Velocette

== Sources ==
- Hoehn, John (2006). Ask for Sixpence. Hirsch Publishing. ISBN 978-0-646-55211-8.
