= Phil Vincent =

British motorcycle designer and manufacturer (1908–1979)

Philip Vincent
- Born: 14 March 1908; Fulham, London, England
- Died: 27 March 1979 (aged 71); Ashford, Surrey, England
- Resting place: St. Peter and St. Paul's Church, Horndon-on-the-Hill, Essex, England
- Education: King's College, Cambridge
- Occupations: Motorcycle designer and manufacturer
- Spouse: Elfrida Nolan (m. 1953)
- Children: 1

Philip Conrad Vincent (14 March 1908 – 27 March 1979) was a British motorcycle designer and manufacturer. Founder of Vincent Motorcycles, his designs influenced the development of motorcycles around the world.

== Early life ==
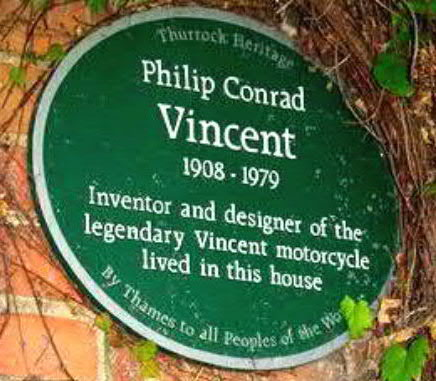
Plaque dedicated in 2002 by Thurrock Heritage on the side of High House, Horndon-on-the-Hill, Essex

Philip Conrad Vincent was born in Wilbraham Gardens, Fulham on 14 March 1908. His mother, Ada Vincent, travelled back from Argentina to have her children in order to secure British citizenship. The family owned a cattle ranch between Monte Buey and Monte Maíz, in the province of Córdoba, Argentina. His education began at St. George's, a British Preparatory School in Quilmes, a suburb of Buenos Aires. He was sent back to England to live with his uncle, John Vincent, who was a veterinary surgeon and lived at High House, Horndon on the Hill, Essex. Philip's education was continued there together with his two sisters, Gwendoline & Marjorie, a cousin and four other local children. He spent a year at Downsend Preparatory School, Leatherhead. He was then accepted at Harrow School where, in the school sanitorium during a three-week period of minor-illness in the company of another patient, an enthusiast, he was introduced to motorcycles.

Philip bought his first motorcycle, a secondhand 350cc BSA from Gamages in Holborn at Christmas 1924 which vibrated badly and was replaced by an ABC; he designed his first bike in 1925. In October 1926 he went up to read the Mechanical Sciences Tripos at King's College, Cambridge at the University of Cambridge. His father agreed that he could have a break from university to develop his first "Vincent Special", with a 350 cc MAG engine, in 1927. In 1928 he had registered a patent for his design of cantilever rear suspension and left Cambridge before graduating. The prototype used his own design of diamond-shaped frame constructed from short-tubes having 'lug' ends consistent with technology of the time, combined with his twin-spring, friction-damped cantilever rear suspension. Other main components added were proprietary – Webb front forks, Royal Enfield brakes, Moss gearbox and a McEvoy fuel tank.

== Manufacturing ==
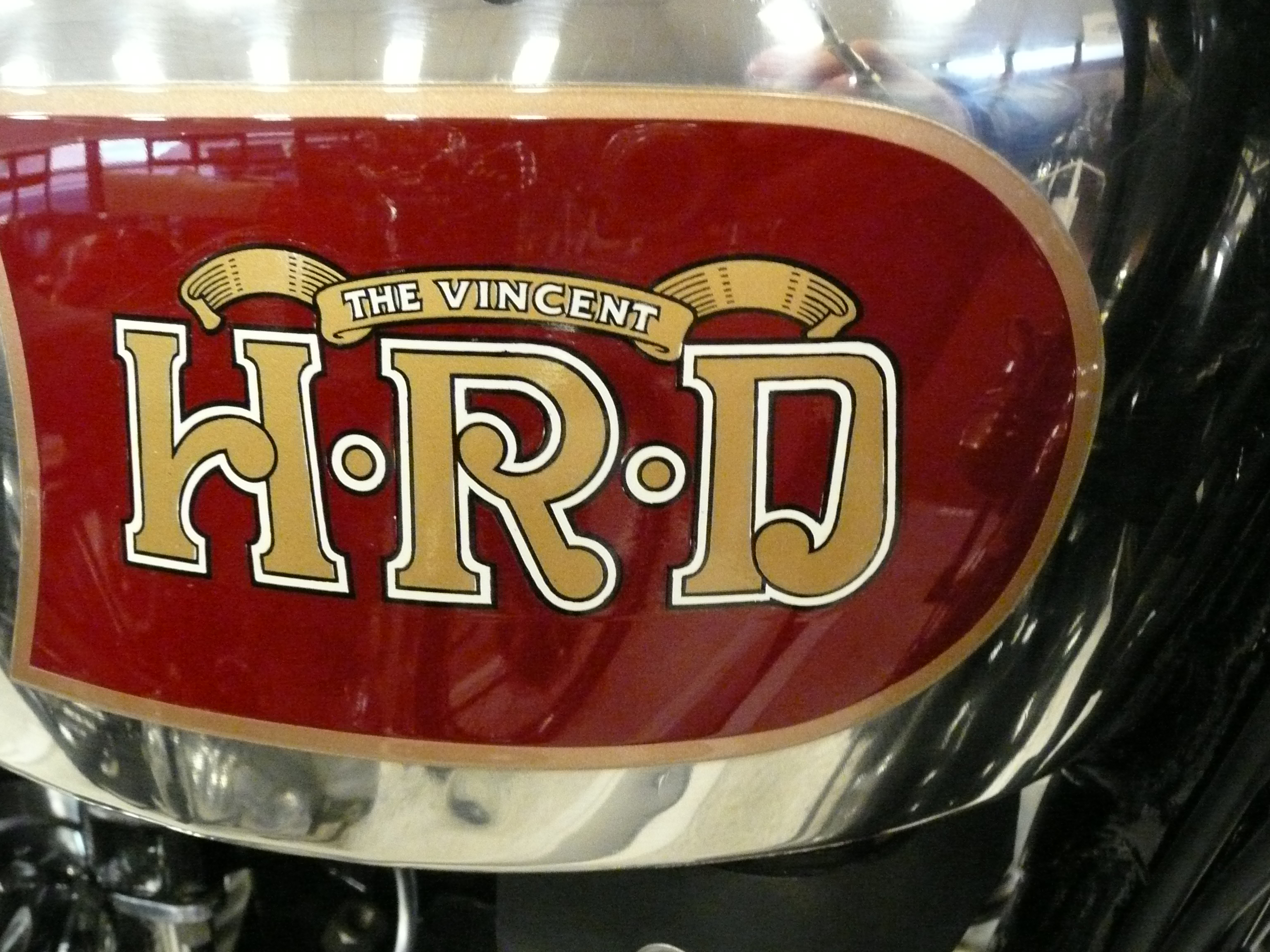

Philip formed his first company with Frank Walker, a family friend. Howard R Davies, founder of the HRD marque and winner of the 1924 Senior Isle of Man TT was in financial difficulties and in 1928 with backing from his family and their cattle ranching business, Philip was able to acquire the trademark, goodwill and remaining HRD spares for £450. The company was promptly named Vincent HRD Co., Ltd., and the logo appeared with The Vincent added in very small letters over the top of the large HRD. Vincent designed a brand new motorcycle with his own spring frame and marketed it as Vincent HRD, with a choice of either JAP or Rudge engines.

In 1928, the first Vincent-HRD motorcycle used a JAP single-cylinder engine in a Vincent-designed cantilever frame. The earliest known example is in Canberra, Australia. Some early bikes used Rudge-Python engines. But after a disastrous 1934 Isle of Man TT, with engine problems and all three entries failing to finish, Philip Vincent (with Phil Irving, who had joined the business in 1931) decided to build their own engines.

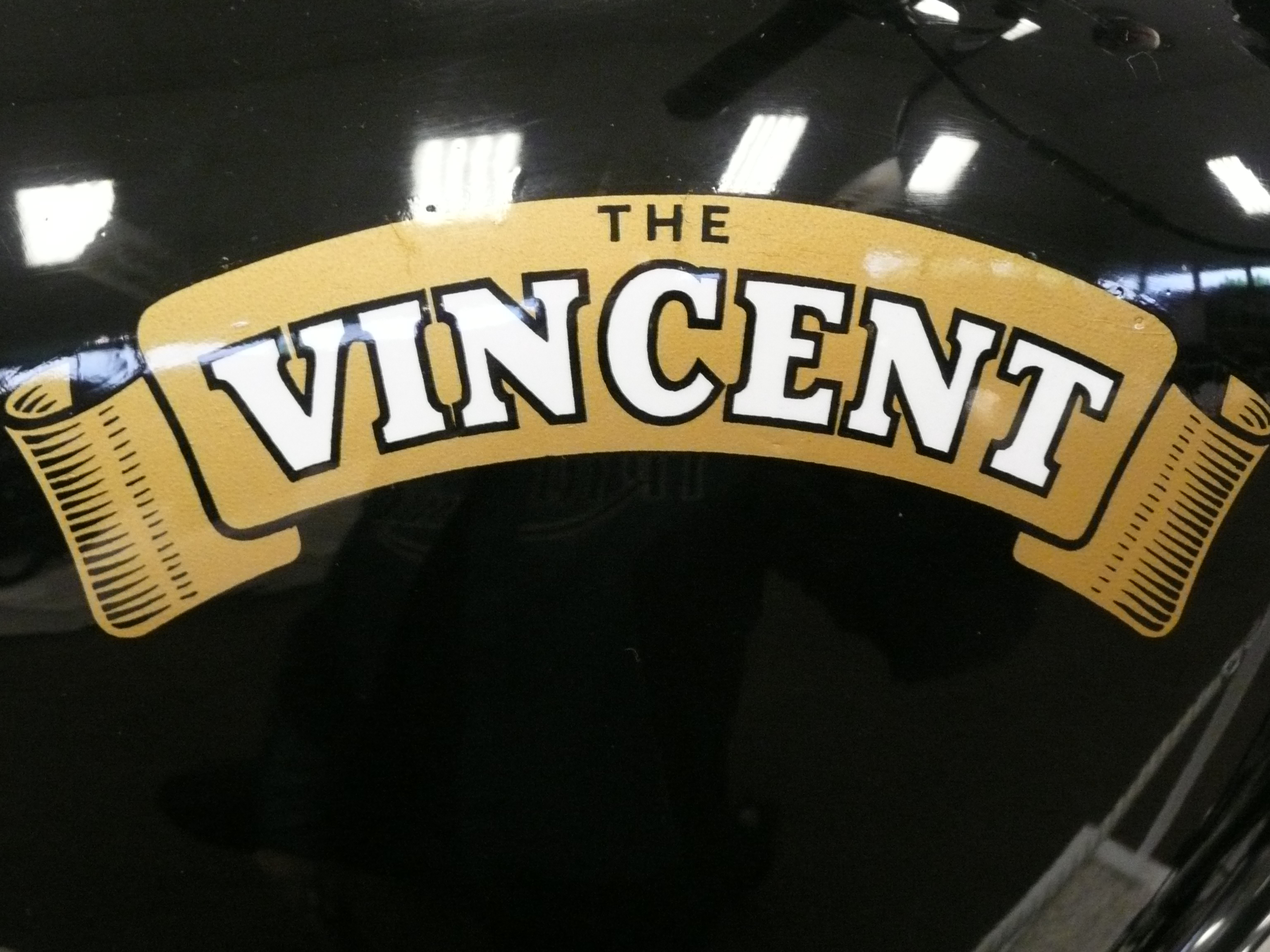

In 1935 the first Vincent powered motorcycle, the 499 cc Comet model was launched. It was quickly followed by the 998 cc Series A Rapide in 1936. During the war when motorcycle production ceased with production switched to armaments, Philip Vincent and Phil Irving designed the Series B twin-cylinder engine with integral gearbox which powered the Series B Rapide. Produced from the cessation of hostilities, it was further developed to power the legendary Vincent Black Shadow and Black Lightning models. In 1949 the HRD logo was dropped to prevent confusion with the "HD" of Harley Davidson in the important American Market.

Philip Vincent also experimented with three-wheeled vehicles, amphibious vehicles, and automobiles. In 1932 the first 3-wheeler, "The Vincent Bantam" appeared, powered by a 293 cc SV JAP or 250 cc Villiers engine. It was a 2.5 cwt delivery van with a car seat and a steering wheel. The Bantam cost £57-10-0 and the windscreen and hood option cost £5-10-0. Production ceased in 1936.

== Writing ==
During the 1960s Vincent contributed to motorcycling journals, writing technical articles as a freelancer.

He used his full title of Phil Vincent C Eng, AMI Mech E, AMIPE (Chartered Engineer, Associate Member of the Institution of Mechanical Engineers, and Associate Member of the Institution of Production Engineers, respectively) in Motor Cycle, and – in accordance with established 'house style' – under the simple abbreviation "P.C.V." in Motorcycle Sport.

Examples of Vincent's works:

- Phil Vincent on oils (1964)
- Spring frame design (1966)
- Three Cylinder engines for roadsters? (1966)
- Vincent suggests a 32-cylinder racer (1967)
- Modern lubrication problems (1969)
- A visit to Castrol (1969)
- PCV on horsepower (1969)

== Later life ==
After the commercial failure of Vincent Motorcycles in 1955, Philip worked on production of small industrial engines, leaving his Stevenage factory for the last time in 1960. He then worked as a car dealer and writer whilst continuing his lifelong technical devotion by working on a rotary-engine concept, which took most of his money.

He collaborated with writer Roy Harper on several books during the early 1970s including his autobiography entitled PCV, before suffering strokes and heart problems.

Philip Conrad Vincent died in 1979 at Ashford Hospital in Middlesex following a long illness. His ashes are interred in the family plot at St. Peter and St. Paul's Church, Horndon-on-the-Hill, Essex.

== See also ==
- Vincent Motorcycles
- HRD Motorcycles
