= Vincent Black Lightning =

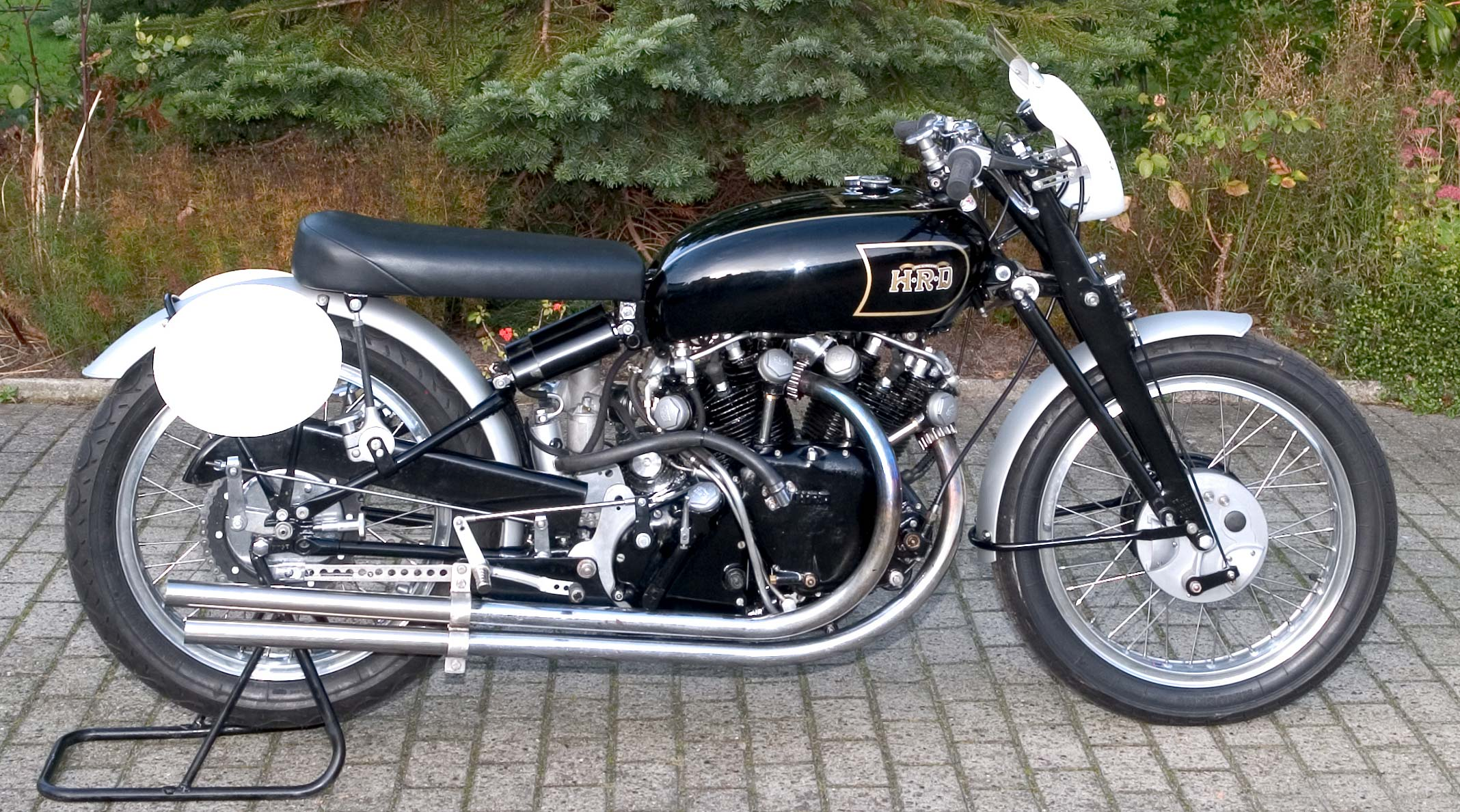
- Manufacturer: Vincent HRD
- Production: 1948–1952
- Engine: 998 cc (60.9 cu in) V-twin, pushrod OHV, air-cooled
- Compression ratio: 6.8:1 to 12.5:1
- Power: 70 bhp (52 kW)
- Wheelbase: 55.5 in (1,410 mm)
- Weight: 380 pounds (170 kg) (dry)
- Fuel capacity: 3.75 imperial gallons (17.0 L)
- Related: Vincent Black Shadow

The Vincent Black Lightning was a Vincent-HRD motorcycle first built in September 1948 at the Vincent works in Great North Road, Stevenage, Hertfordshire, UK, and produced from 1948 to 1952. The bike was a purpose-built factory modified Black Shadow that was then named and produced as the Black Lightning. At the time the Black Lightning was the fastest production motorcycle in the world.

== Development ==
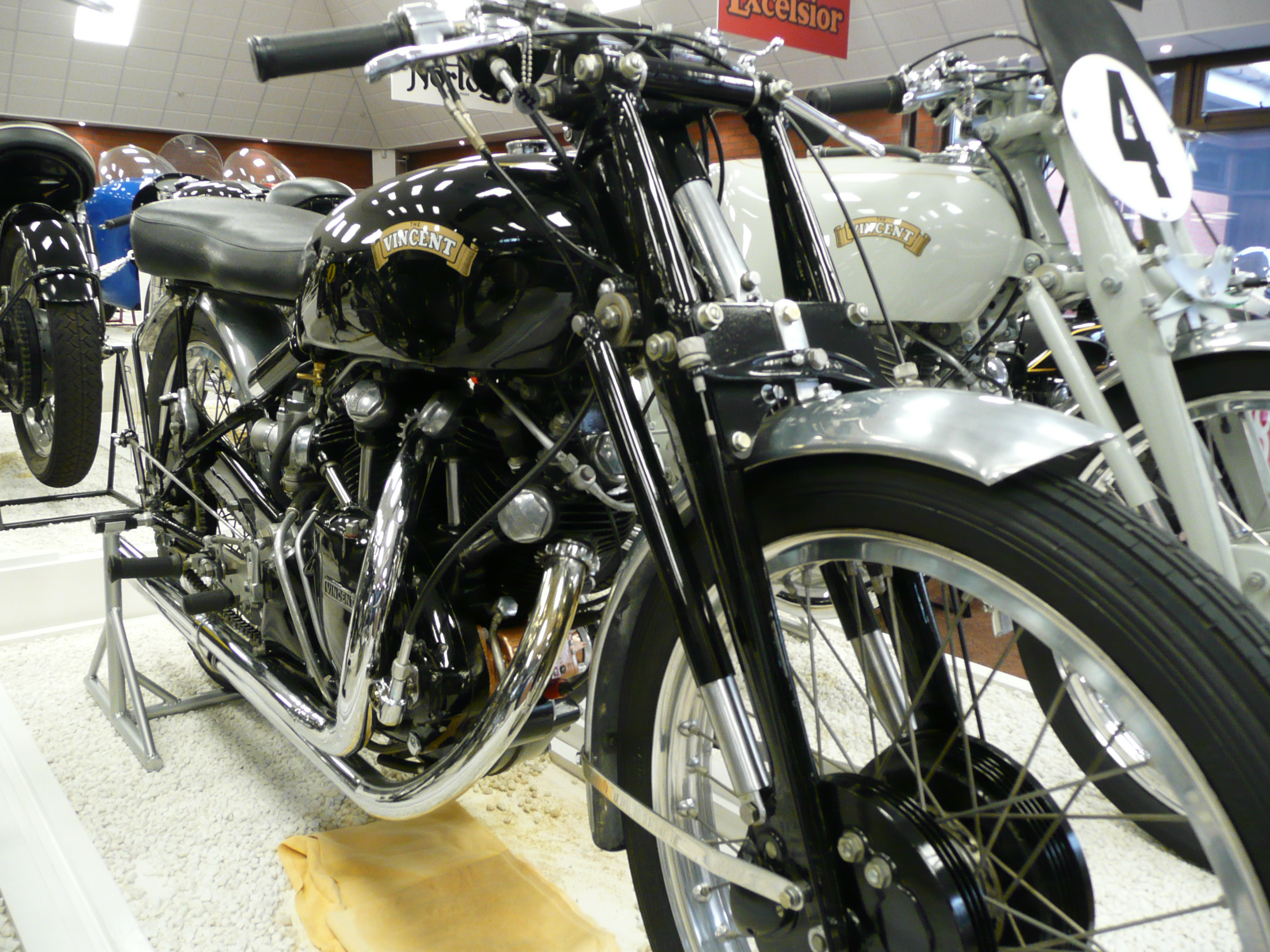
Vincent Series C Black Lightning

Vincent-HRD began motorcycle production in 1928 and were well established after World War II when they launched the 1,000 cc (61 cu in) Black Lightning. This was a production version of the Black Lightning which held the motorcycle land-speed record, with a similar engine specification.

Available to order, a standard Black Lightning was supplied in racing trim with magnesium alloy components, special racing tires on alloy rims, rear-set foot controls, a solo seat and aluminium mudguards. This reduced the Lightning's weight to 380 lb (170 kg). The 998 cc (60.9 cu in) air-cooled OHV pushrod V-twin specifications were always based on standard parts but upgraded with higher-performance racing equipment. The Black Lightning had higher-strength connecting rods, larger inlet ports, polished rocker gear, steel idler gears, racing carburettors, and a manual-advance magneto, and was available with compression ratios between 6.8:1 and 12.5:1. This resulted in 70 bhp (52 kW) and a top speed of 150 mph (240 km/h). Only 31 Black Lightnings were built before production ended in 1952 because of Vincent's financial problems.

== US record and picture ==
Rollie Free speed record attempt at Bonneville Salt Flats in 1948

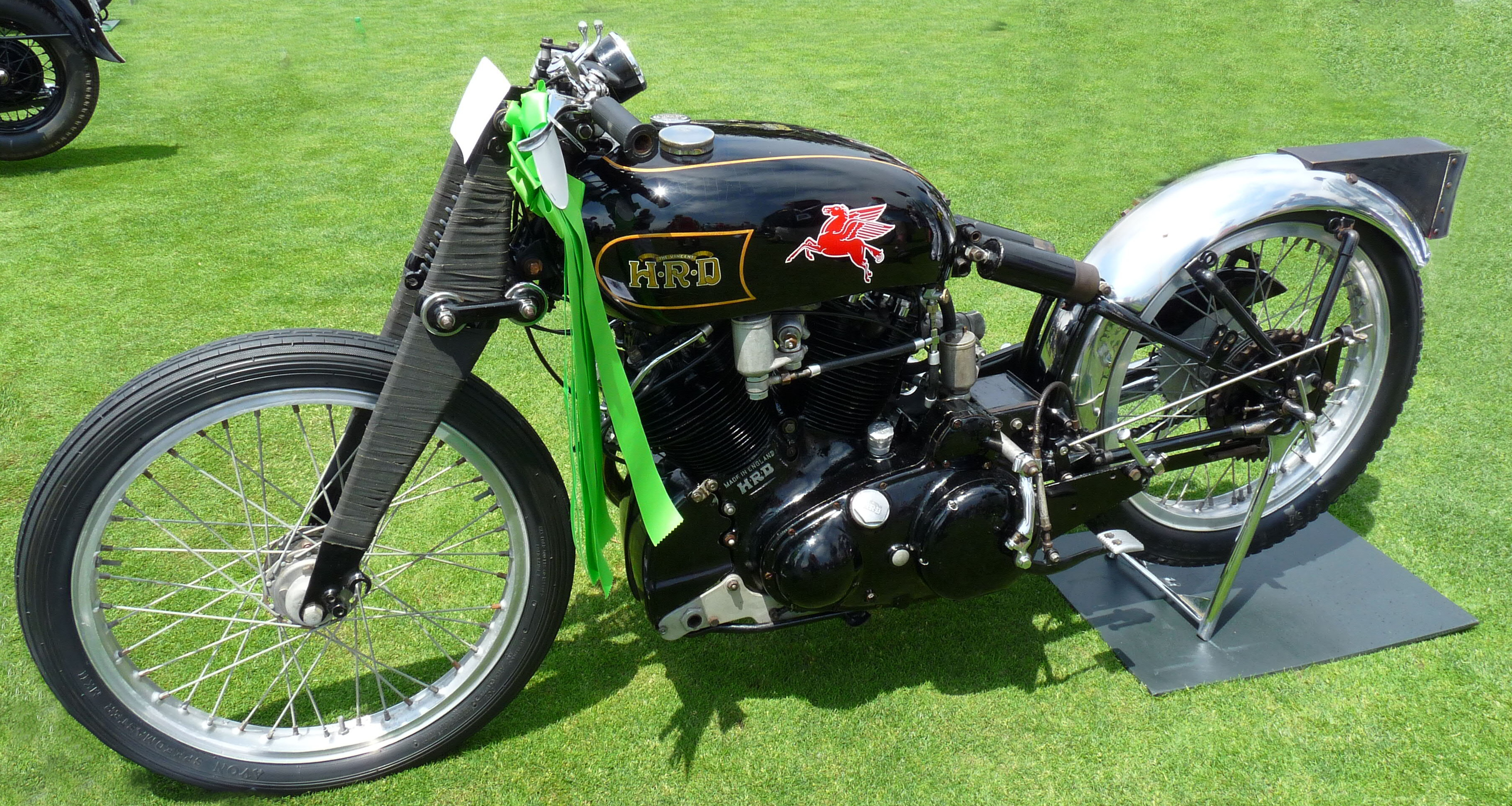
The machine used by Rollie Free displayed at Pebble Beach in 2009

On 13 September 1948, Rollie Free achieved the US national motorcycle speed record at Bonneville Salt Flats in Utah riding the first Vincent Black Lightning. During test runs Free reached average speeds of 148.6 mph (239.1 km/h). To reduce drag, Free stripped to his swimming shorts for the final run, which he made lying flat with his legs stretched out and his head low, guiding the Vincent by following a black stripe painted on the salt bed. The stunt worked as Free covered the mile in 23.9 seconds, passing 150 mph (240 km/h) and on the return run he reached a record average speed of 150.313 mph (241.905 km/h). This led to one of the most famous photographs in motorcycle history, known as the "bathing suit bike". The American Motorcyclist Association certified Free's record. Innovative features of the bike included the first-ever Vincent rear shock absorber, the first Mk II racing cams and horizontally mounted racing carburettors. In 1950, Rollie Free returned to the Bonneville Salt Flats and broke his own record, averaging speeds of 156.58 mph (251.99 km/h) on the Vincent despite a high-speed crash during those speed trials.

== Auction record ==
In February 2018, during an auction held by Bonhams at Las Vegas, a Black Lightning, stated to be one of only 19 surviving, set a world record for the highest-price paid at auction for a motorcycle of $US929,000 ($1.16 million Australian). The machine was used to set a national speed record in Australia during 1953, and was purchased by an undisclosed Australian.

== Richard Thompson song ==
Richard Thompson wrote the song "1952 Vincent Black Lightning" and recorded it for his 1991 album Rumor and Sigh. Thompson later said, "When I was a kid, that was always the exotic bike ... the one that made you go 'ooh, wow'". The song's outlaw hero James, who has "robbed many a man to get my Vincent machine," comments on the bike's mystique in his dying speech:

Says James: "In my opinion,
there's nothing in this world,
beats a '52 Vincent,
and a red-headed girl.
Now Nortons, and Indians, and Greeveses won't do;
they don't have a soul
like a Vincent '52."

== See also ==
- Vincent Black Shadow
- Vincent Rapide
- List of motorcycles of the 1940s
- List of motorcycles of the 1950s

== Notes ==
Records
Preceded by SS100 Pendine	Fastest production motorcycle 1949–1952	Succeeded by Kawasaki Z1
