= List of Vincent motorcycles =

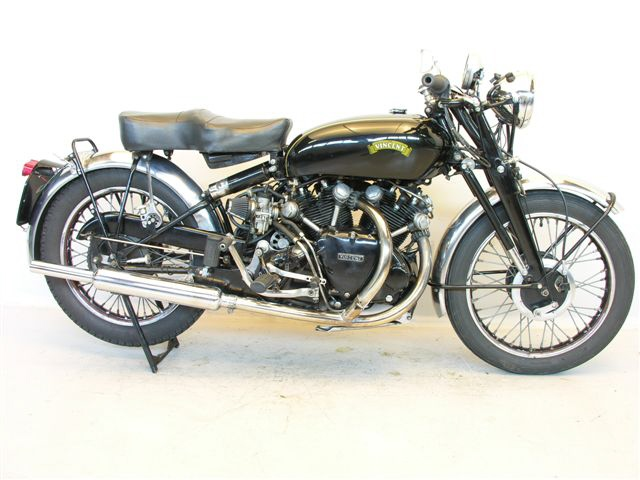
1950 Vincent Black Shadow

This is a list of Vincent Motorcycles.

Year	Engine	Model	Notes
1932	250cc	Bantam trike	delivery van
1935	500cc	Meteor	First in-house Vincent engine
1934	500cc	Comet
1935	500cc	Comet Special	TT replica
1936	1000cc	Series-A Rapide
1946	1000cc	Series-B Rapide
1948	500cc	Series-B Meteor
1948	500cc	Series-C Comet
1948	500cc	Series-C Grey Flash
1948	1000cc	Rapide
1948	1000cc	Series-C Black Shadow
1948	1000cc	Series-C Black Lightning
1949	1000cc	Series-C White Shadow
1950	500cc	Series-C Red Comet
1953	45cc	Firefly	Power Cycle
1954	1000cc	Series-D Black Knight	faired Rapide
1954	1000cc	Series-D Black Prince	faired Shadow
1954	50cc	NSU Quickly
1955	1000cc	Three Wheeler
1955	123cc	NSU Fox

== See also ==
- List of AMC motorcycles*
- List of Ariel motorcycles
- List of BSA motorcycles
- List of Norton motorcycles
- List of Triumph motorcycles
- List of Royal Enfield motorcycles
- List of Velocette motorcycles
