= Andrew Stroud =

New Zealand motorcycle racer

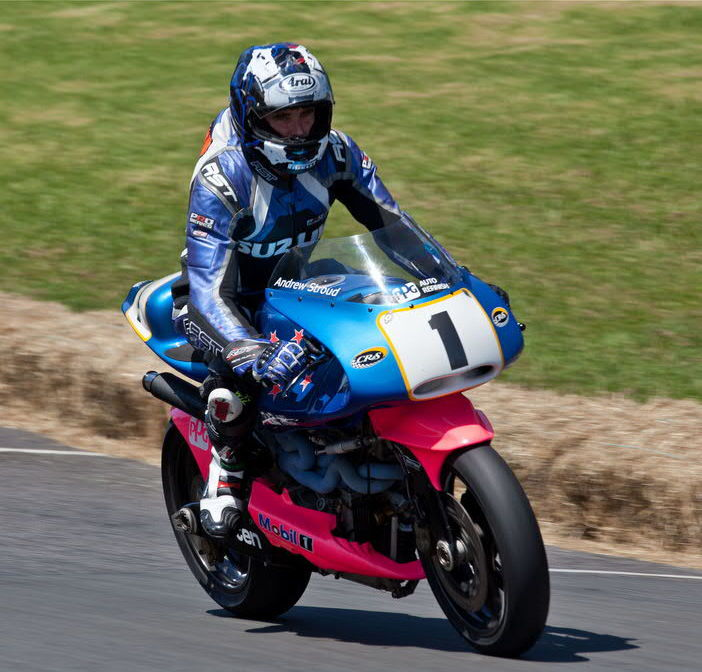
- Andrew Stroud on the Britten V1000 at Paeroa, Waikato, New Zealand in February 2011
- Nationality: New Zealander
- Born: 31 December 1967; Upper Hutt, New Zealand

Andrew Stroud (born 31 December 1967) is a retired champion New Zealand motorcycle racer.

== Early and personal life ==
Stroud lived in Howick, Auckland and educated at St Peter's College and Macleans College. He went on to study engineering (for a three-year period) at Auckland Technical Institute (NZCE Mechanical) before heading to the US to embark on a full-time racing career in 1988. His height is 185 cm and his weight is generally 74 kg. He resides in Hamilton, New Zealand. Since marrying Karyn in 1997, they have had ten children together (Jacob, Caleb, Maddy, Jesse, Isabella, Macallum, Joseph, Lucia, Amea and Elsie).

== Career highlights ==
Stroud started racing in 1986 and won his first championship in 1988 in the NZ 250 Production class. He then raced at Bathurst, where he finished second (behind Mick Doohan) in the 1988 Arai 500 km Superbike race.

In 1988, Stroud raced in the US Endurance series and partnered Graeme Crosby in the Suzuka 8 Hours in Japan. For the next ten years, he competed internationally against the world's best, riding for various Superbike and Grand Prix teams.

Stroud first rode the New Zealand-built Britten V1000 at Daytona in 1992. During the epic battle with the leading factory Ducati Superbike, Stroud came within 0.1 sec of the outright lap record before an electrical problem stopped the bike with a couple of laps remaining. However, he won both races at Daytona in 1994 on the Britten bike while setting the fastest top speed recorded by any motorcycle at Daytona (189 mph or 305 km/h). One of the few people to have had the privilege of racing one of John Britten's superbikes, Stroud won the Battle-of-the-Twins at Daytona on Britten superbikes in 1994, 1995, 1996 and 1997.

In 1995, Stroud won the inaugural World B.E.A.R.S Series (British European American Racing Series, now part of AHMRA) on a Britten bike, three weeks before his friend, John Britten, died. Also in 1995 and on a Britten, Stroud won the European Pro-Twins at Assen. Soon after he put a Kawasaki Superbike on position for the FIM Endurance World Championship round at the same track. In 1997, he won the American AMA Formula Xtreme Championship.

Stroud competed in 41 World Superbike races, 20 FIM 500 GP races, four Suzuka 8 Hours races, one Isle of Man race and three 24hours World endurance races.

Stroud won nine New Zealand superbike national championships. His first championship was in 1991. He repeated this in 1995 and 1999 (riding a Britten V1000) and, riding a Suzuki GSX-R1000 (latterly the GSXR1000K9), in 2002, 2003, 2004, 2006, 2010 and 2011. In 2011, Stroud became national champion for the last time.

Stroud announced his retirement from motorcycle racing in August 2013. Stroud helps manage two of his sons Jacob and Jesse in their racing endeavours. His oldest son Jacob won his first of three national titles in 2016. Younger brother Jesse won his first National (Gixxer cup) championship in 2019.
