= Paeroa Street Circuit =

Circuit for motorcycle racing in New Zealand

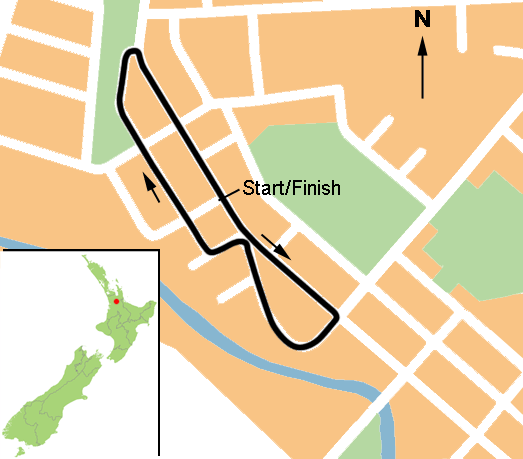
- Map of the Paeroa Street Circuit
- Location: Paeroa, New Zealand
- Coordinates: 37°22′47″S 175°40′11″E
- Capacity: 15,000
- Opened: February 1991
- Closed: September 2018
- Length: 1.520 km (0.945 miles)

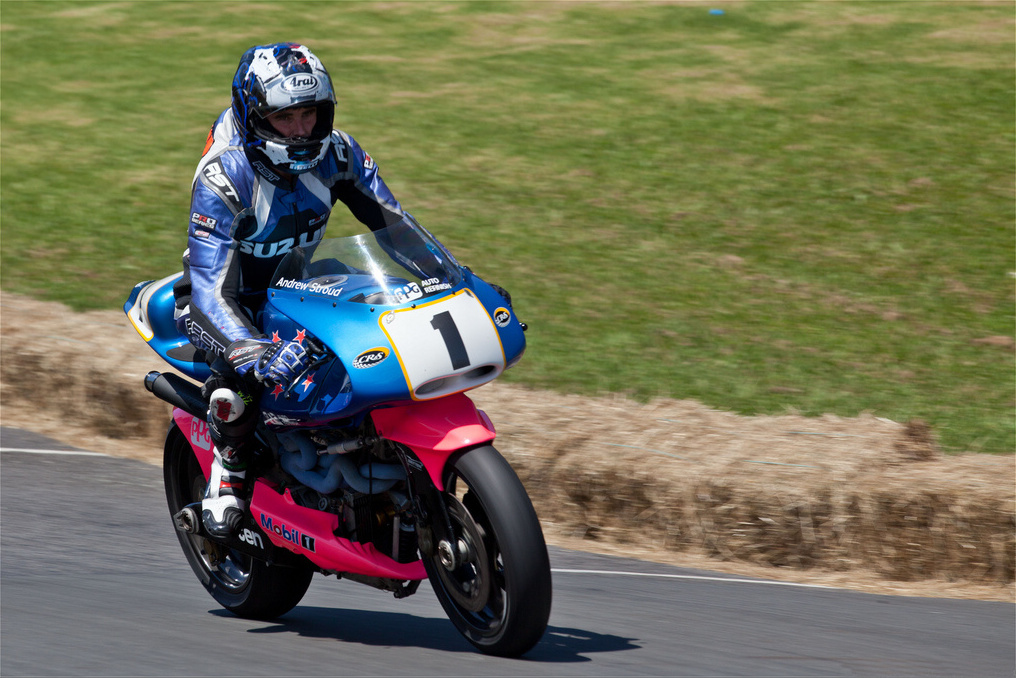
Andrew Stroud on the Britten V1000 at Paeroa in 2011

Paeroa Street Circuit was a 'hacksaw'-shaped temporary street circuit for motorcycle racing in downtown Paeroa, New Zealand.

The course ran along Belmont Road, Normanby Road and State Highway 2 with a right turn into Arney Street and then over the hill into Princes Street. The circuit then running into the 'S' bends linking Wharf Street to Marshall Street, along the main straight to the hairpin opposite the Railway Reserve and back into Belmont Road.

Maximum speeds could reach between 220 km/h (140 mph) and 280 km/h (170 mph) along the main straight. The motorcycle race meeting had been held during February since 1991 until 2018 with the name ‘Battle of the Streets’ attracting participants from across New Zealand and overseas. It was one of the biggest motor racing meetings in New Zealand and the biggest sports event in the Thames Valley with around 13,000 to 15,000 spectators.

The one-mile street lap was home to a wide range of classic and modern motorcycles, consisting of 11 classes that ran throughout the day including:

- Junior Classics
- Senior Classics
- Post Classic Historic Pre-1972
- Post Classics – Forgotten Era Pre-1982
- Formula 2
- Formula 3
- Formula Paeroa
- Sidecars
- BEARS
- Super Motard
- Robert Holden Memorial Race
