= Vincent Meteor =

Vincent HRD Comet, Series A
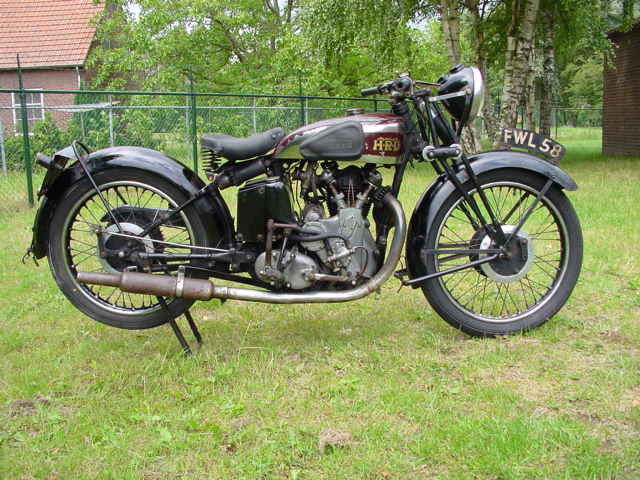
- Manufacturer: Vincent HRD Co., Ltd
- Production: 1935-55
- Engine: 499 cc single cylinder, OHV, air cooled
- Power: 26 bhp @ 5,300 rpm
- Transmission: four speed
- Weight: 413 pounds (187 kg) (dry)
- Related: Vincent Comet

The Vincent Meteor is a British motorcycle designed and built at the Vincent works in Great North Road, Stevenage, Hertfordshire UK. Developed from the Vincent Rapide by Australian engineer Phil Irving in 1935, the Meteor was powered by Vincent Motorcycles first in-house engine and was one of four 499cc single models. As well as the 'standard' Meteor, Vincent produced a sports version, the Vincent Comet, as well as a TT racing model which shared many of the same cycle parts.

== Development ==
Vincent-HRD began in 1928 when Phil Vincent acquired the name, as well as all the jigs, tools and patterns of the HRD Company. Vincent started with engines from other makers such as JAP and Rudge but problems with supplies led to the development of his own 500cc single in 1934. Vincent is quoted as saying at the time "...we never wanted to see another Jap engine as long as we lived and decided we should design and manufacture our own." Designed by Australian engineer Phil Irving, the new engine was developed over three months and the prototype Series 'A' Meteor was refined and developed into a production model, the Series 'B' Meteor, which was produced at the same time as the Series 'C' Comet, with the main differences being the new Girdraulic front fork fitted to the Comet while the Meteor had traditional Brampton girder forks and a slightly smaller carburettor.

An advanced feature of the new Meteor engine was an invention to reduce valve failure, which they decided was caused by lateral vibration. A special design of upper and lower valve guides, without a centre section, meant that the valves had no fulcrum and into the central section they fitted a forked rocker pressed onto a shouldered valve stem. This effectively eliminated the 'rocking' action of the conventional top-end rocker and Vincent top ends set a new performance standard.

When production of Series 'B' models was phased out in 1950 the Meteor was dropped from the range, making it one of the rarer post-war Vincent-HRDs. Falling sales of expensive motorcycles led to closure of the Vincent works in 1956.

== Vanishing 'HRD' ==
The letters HRD were discontinued in 1950 after Phil Vincent visited his American agents and was informed that HRD was too easily confused with the Harley Davidson HD badge. Vincent had gone to a lot of trouble to secure the rights to the HRD logo but had the letters HRD ground off all the castings, which were then polished - but it is still possible to see the letters on some models.

== Surviving examples ==
Vincent Meteors in good condition are highly sought after by collectors and enthusiasts. In March 2008 a 1939 Vincent Meteor 500cc sold by auction for £28,000 ($46,000).

== See also ==
- Vincent Motorcycles
- Vincent Grey Flash
- List of motorcycles of the 1930s
- List of motorcycles of the 1940s
- List of motorcycles of the 1950s
