= Vincent Comet =

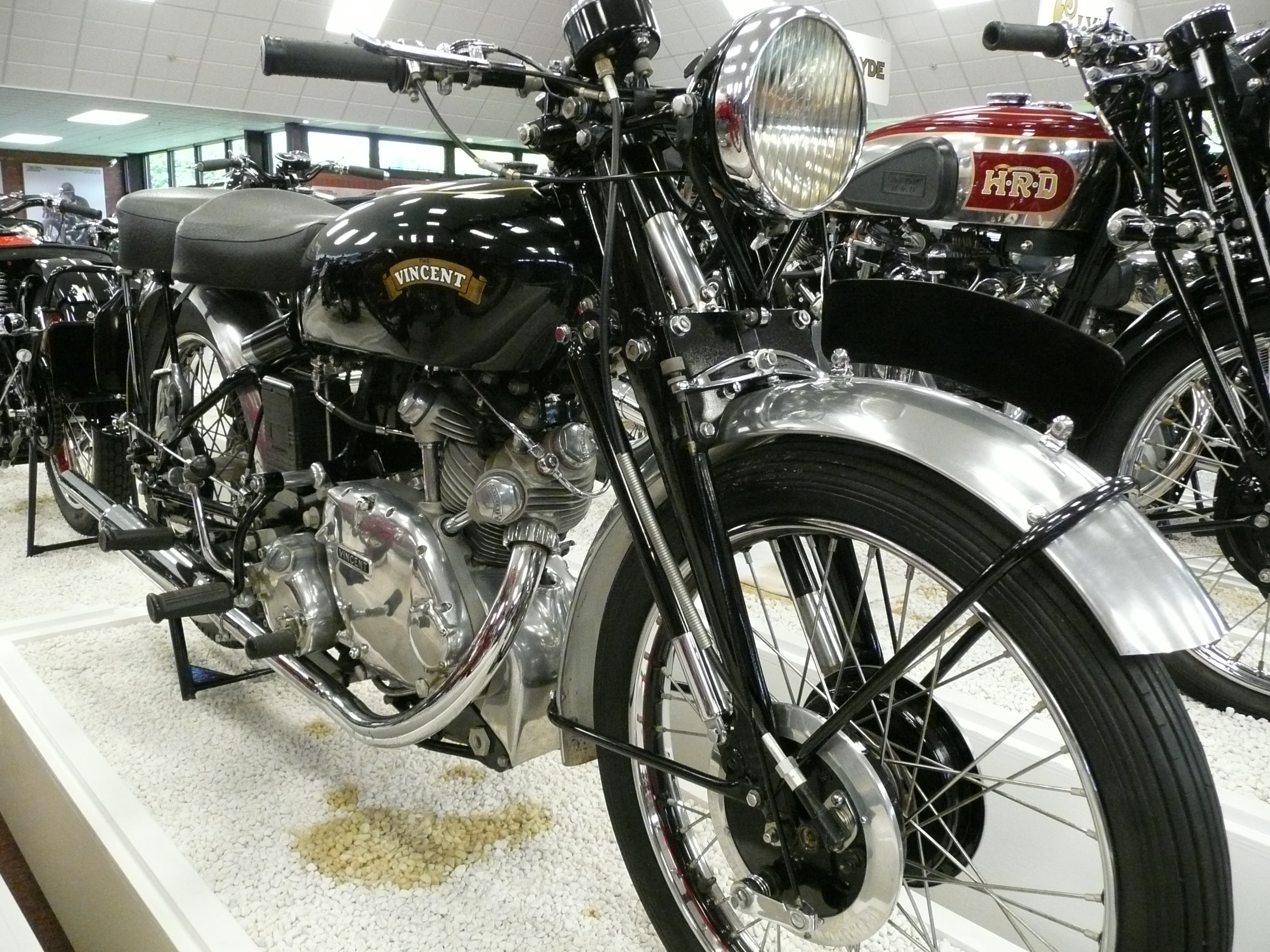
- Manufacturer: Vincent HRD Co., Ltd
- Production: 1935-1955
- Engine: 499 cc single-cylinder, OHV, air-cooled
- Power: 28 hp @ 5,800 rpm
- Transmission: four-speed
- Weight: 413 pounds (187 kg) (dry)

The Vincent Comet was designed and built at the Vincent works in Great North Road, Stevenage, Hertfordshire, England. It was one of four 499 cc single models. As well as the sports Comet, Vincent produced a TT racing model, the Comet Special (a TT model with lights) and the standard Vincent Meteor which shared many of the same cycle parts.

An unusual feature of the valve design for these motors was the double valve guides, and the attachment of the forked rocker arm to a shoulder between the guides, to eliminate side forces on the valve stem and ensure maximum valve life under racing conditions.

The prototype series A was refined and developed into a production model B but after World War II it was the development of the series C that represents the ultimate Vincent 500 cc single. A series D was actually designed and one was built at the factory. Others had to be subsequently made up from spare parts as Vincent production ceased in 1955.

== Specifications ==
The 499 cc single-cylinder, high-camshaft OHV, air-cooled Vincent engine had a light alloy barrel and cylinder head with a cast-iron liner, and a 'backbone' type combined frame and oil tank. The engine acting as a stressed member of the frame, and most other components in common with the post-war twin-cylinder models. Unlike the twins, it had a Burman BAP four-speed gearbox held by a vertical piece of cast aluminium, which mated with the backbone frame that it shared with the twin models. At the time and to this day some members of the motorcycling fraternity quipped that it was really only 'half of' the desirable Rapide twin-cylinder model, although in fact the specification had more in common with the higher performance Black Shadow twin-cylinder model, sharing compression ratio (7.3:1) and the larger carburettor. Unlike the Black Shadow however, it did not have polished internals nor was it selectively assembled. All Comet models had Vincent's "Girdraulic" forks and sprung cantilever rear suspension with hydraulic damping at a time when most manufacturers continued to produce rigid frames.

== See also ==
- Vincent Motorcycles
- Vincent Grey Flash
- List of motorcycles of the 1940s
- List of motorcycles of the 1950s
