= Britten Motorcycle Company =

New Zealand motorcycle company founded by John Britten

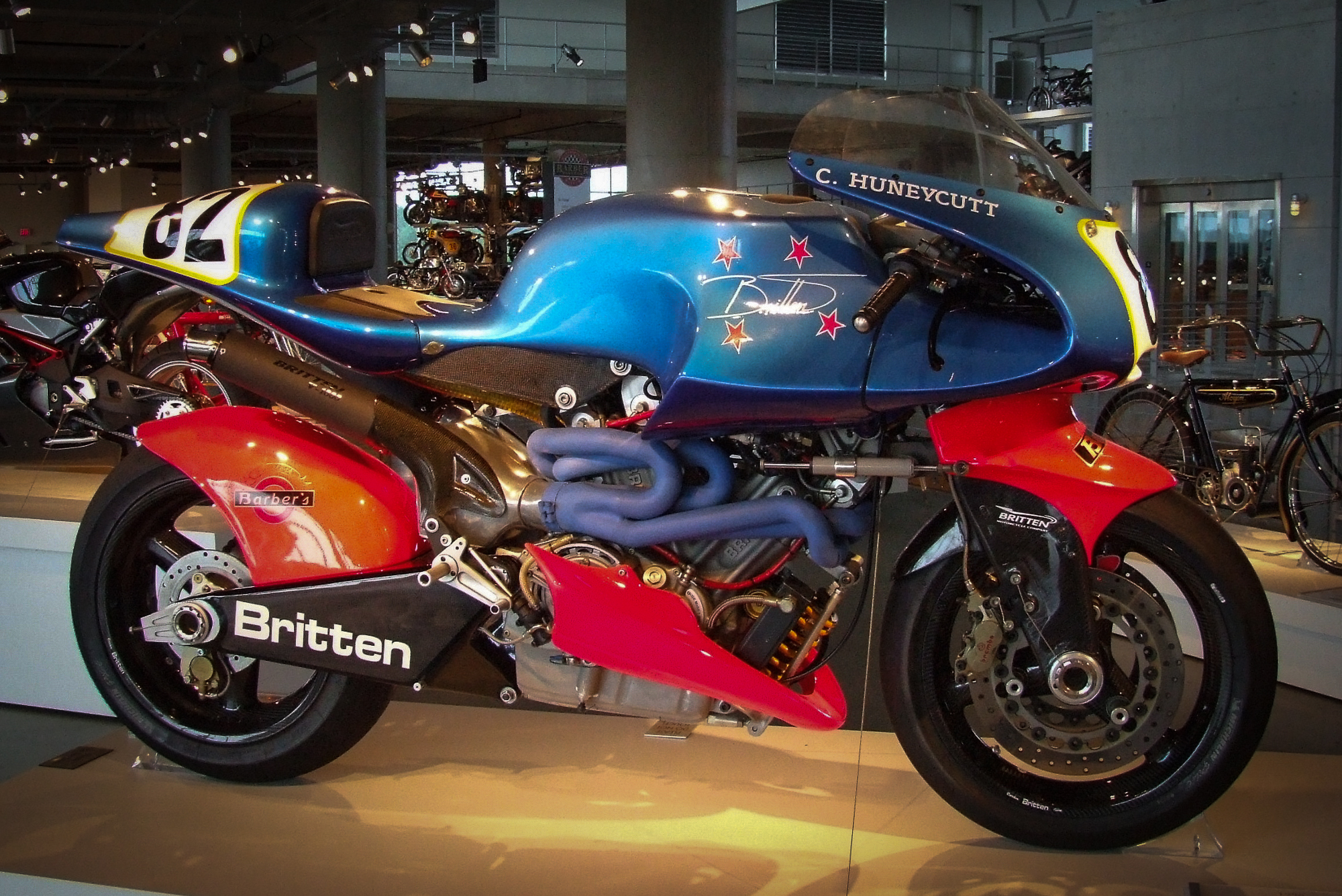
- Industry: Motorcycles
- Founded: 1992; 34 years ago
- Founder: John Britten
- Headquarters: Christchurch, New Zealand
- Products: Britten V1000
- Website: www.britten.co.nz

Britten Motorcycle Company is a Christchurch, New Zealand, motorcycle manufacturer created by John Britten in 1992. The company produced the Britten V1000 motorcycles, which were unusual for their heavy use of carbon fibre for the fairing, wheels and swingarm.

Britten motorcycles had no chassis in the traditional sense. Instead, the engine behaved as a stressed member of the chassis and each end of the motorcycle was bolted to it. Only 10 units were produced by hand between 1991 until Britten's death in 1995. The company continues to exist in a reduced form, preserving the legacy of Britten.
