= Solvang Vintage Motorcycle Museum =

Museum in Solvang, California

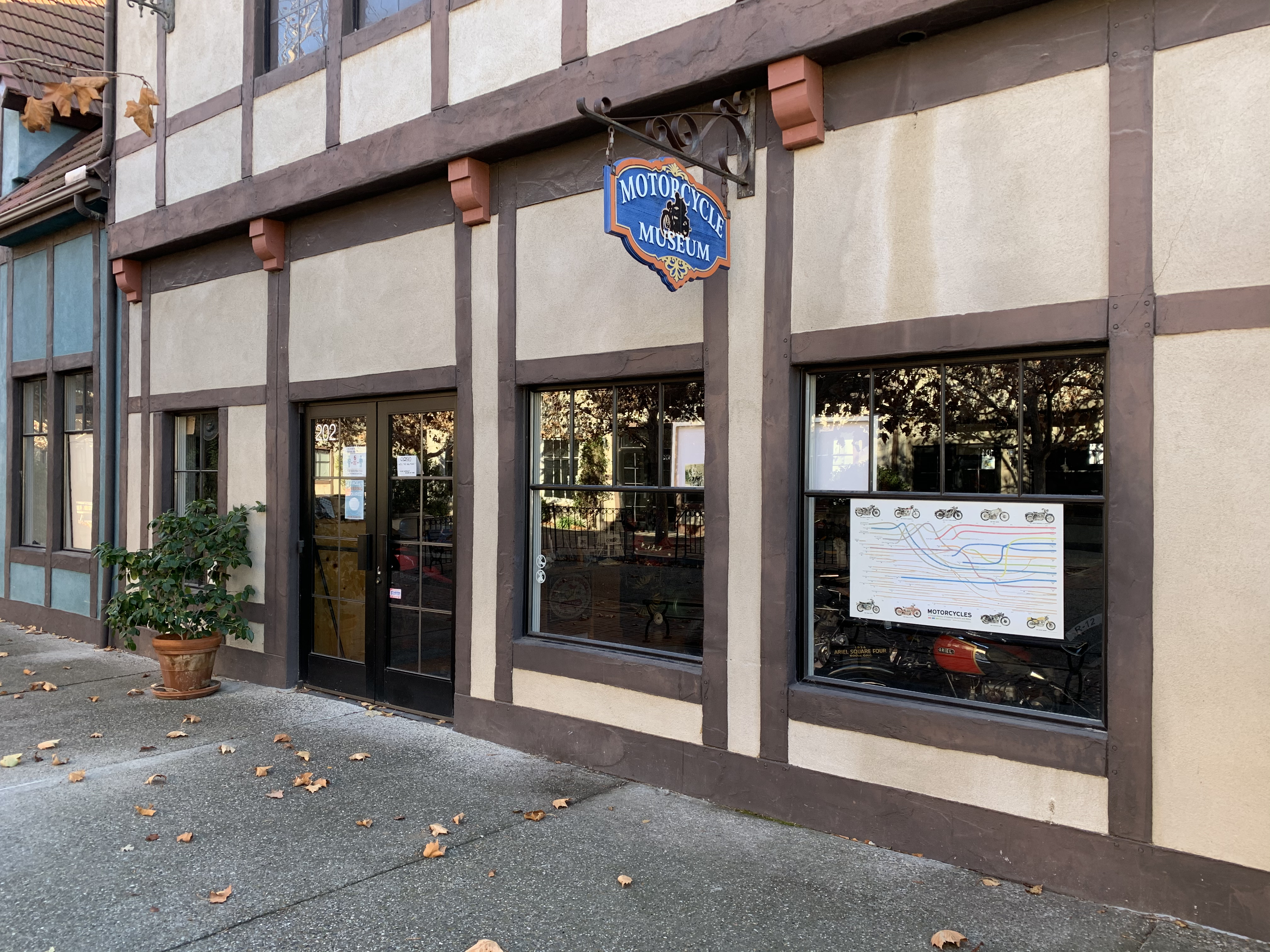
- Established: March 2000
- Location: Solvang, California
- Coordinates: 34.5914°N 120.1395°W
- Founder: Virgil Elings
- Owner: Virgil Elings
- Website: www.motosolvang.com

The Solvang Vintage Motorcycle Museum is a 'Collector's Collection' museum in Solvang, California, United States. The museum was founded in March 2000 by Virgil Elings, a local retiree and a collector of motorcycles.

The museum's collection includes a Britten V1000, a supercharged version of a Vincent Black Lightning, and a rare Vincent Grey Flash, one of four Isle of Man TT racing specials.
