= Britten V1000 =

Handbuilt race motorcycle

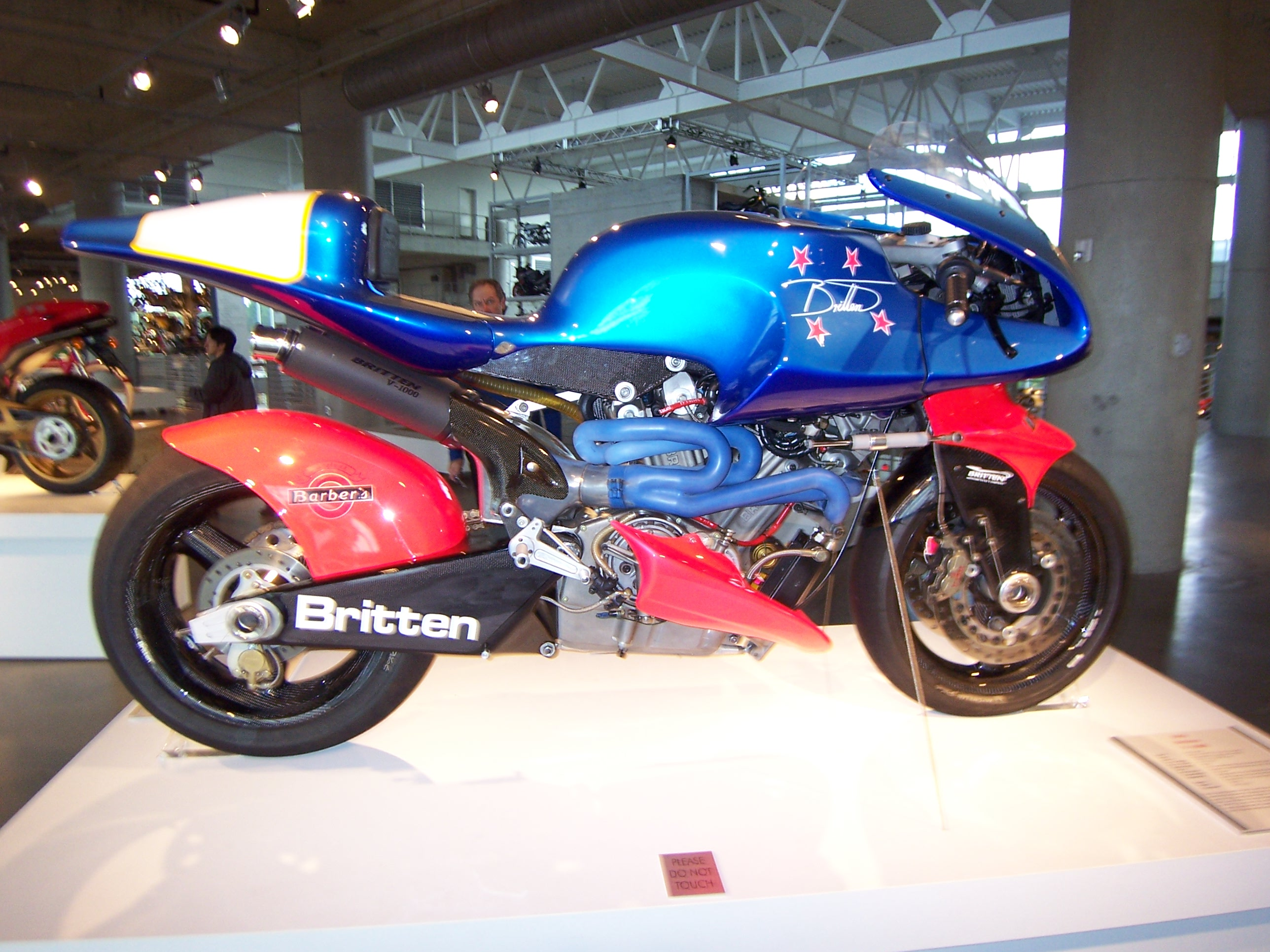
- Manufacturer: Britten Motorcycle Company
- Also called: The Britten
- Production: 1991-1998
- Assembly: Carlyle Street, Christchurch, South Island, New Zealand
- Predecessor: Aero-D-One
- Engine: 998.7 cc (61 cu in) Water-cooled, 60 deg V-Twin quad cam 4-stroke
- Bore / stroke: 98.9 mm × 65.0 mm (3.89 in × 2.56 in)
- Top speed: 303 km/h (188 mph)
- Transmission: 5-speed constant-mesh, manual, chain-drive / opt. 6-speed
- Brakes: Front: Dual 320 mm (12.6in) cast-iron discs, Rear: 210 mm (8.3in) disc
- Wheelbase: 1420 mm
- Weight: 138 kg (303.6 lb) (wet)
- Fuel capacity: 24 L (5.3 imp gal; 6.3 US gal)

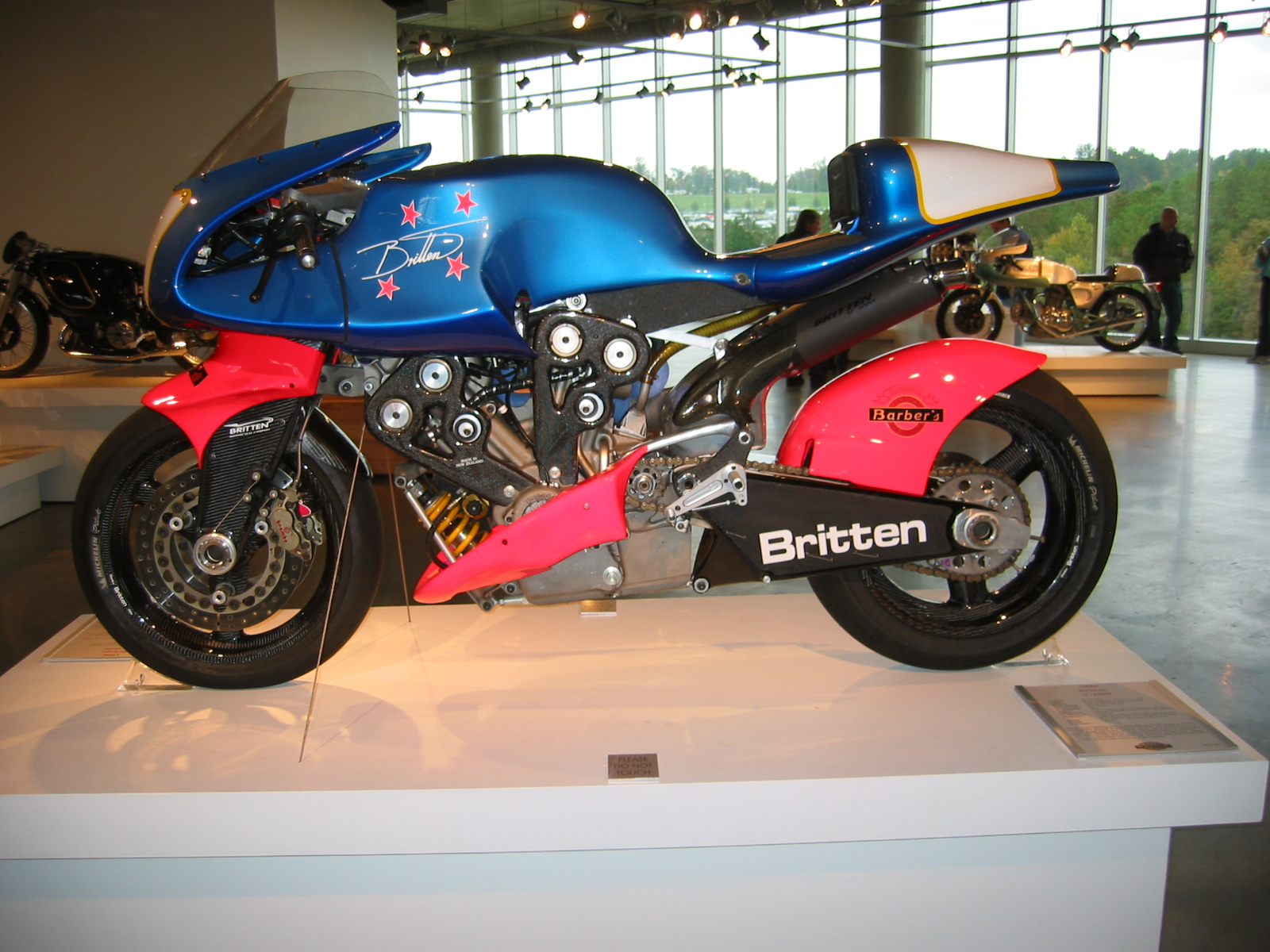
The No.7 Britten V1000 at Barber Vintage Motorcycle Museum in Alabama, USA

The Britten V1000 is a handbuilt race motorcycle designed and built by John Britten and a group of friends in Christchurch, New Zealand, during the early 1990s. The bike went on to win the Battle of the Twins in Daytona International Speedway's Daytona Bike Week festivities in the United States and set several world speed records.

The bike makes extensive use of carbon fibre, and features a radiator located under the seat, double wishbone front suspension, frameless chassis, and engine data logging.

A total of 10 Britten V1000s were produced by the Britten Motorcycle Company and now exist in collections and museums around the world.

Motorcycle journalist Alan Cathcart wrote in 2008:

"It's an easy bike to ride, in the sense it's got a very wide power delivery, but to really get top performance, you have to ride it like a grand prix bike...And having ridden all the superbike contenders in the world today, I can say that the Britten is the closest to a grand prix bike...It's incredibly ironic that instead of Europe or Japan, the most sophisticated and technically advanced motorcycle in the world comes from New Zealand".

== Specifications ==
- Wheelbase: 1420 mm
- Weight: 138 kg (304 lb)
- Fuel tank capacity: 24 litres
- 166 hp (124 kW) at 11,800 rpm
- Maximum safe engine speed: 12,500 rpm
- Maximum speed: 303 km/h (188 mph)

=== Engine ===
- Water-cooled 999 cc 60 deg V-Twin quad-cam 4-stroke
- 4 valves per cylinder, belt driven
- Compression ratio: 11.3 : 1
- Bore x stroke 98.9 mm x 65 mm
- Piston, flat-top slipper
- Titanium conrods with oil feed to little end
- Titanium valves Inlet Ø40 mm Exhaust Ø33 mm
- Wet cast-iron cylinder sleeves / opt silicon carbide–coated alloy sleeves
- Composite head gaskets
- Back torque dry clutch
- Wet sump. Oil feeds to bigends, gudgeon pins, camshaft lobes & gearbox shafts
- Programmable engine management computer with history facility
- Fuel injection - sequential, 2 injectors per cylinder

=== Transmission ===
- Gearbox: 5-speed constant-mesh, sequential manual transmission, chain-drive / opt. 6-speed
- Primary ratio: 1.97
- Gear ratios: 1st 2.5, 2nd 1.77, 3rd 1.38, 4th 1.125, 5th 0.961

=== Chassis ===
- Fully stressed engine with ducted under-seat radiator. Top chassis, girder & swing arm all constructed in carbon/kevlar composites
- Front suspension: double wishbones, Hossack suspension.
- Rear suspension: swing arm with adjustable three-bar linkage
- Shock absorbers: Öhlins
- Rake: adjustable
- Trail: adjustable
- Front wheel: 3.5" x 17" in-house carbon composite
- Rear wheel: 6.0" x 17" in-house carbon composite
- Front brakes: Twin 320 mm cast-iron rotors with opposed 4-piston Brembo callipers
- Rear brakes: 210 mm rotor with opposed-piston Brembo calliper

== Racing Achievements ==
=== 1991 ===
- 2nd and 3rd Battle of the Twins, Daytona, USA

=== 1992 ===
- 1st Battle of the Twins, Assen, Netherlands
- 2nd Pro Twins, Laguna Seca Raceway, USA
- DNF Battle of the Twins, Daytona, USA

=== 1993 ===
- Fastest Top Speed at the Isle of Man TT
- 1st (BEARS) 2nd (Formula 1) Australian TT Bathurst
- 3rd Battle of the Twins, Assen, Netherlands
- NZ Grand Prix title

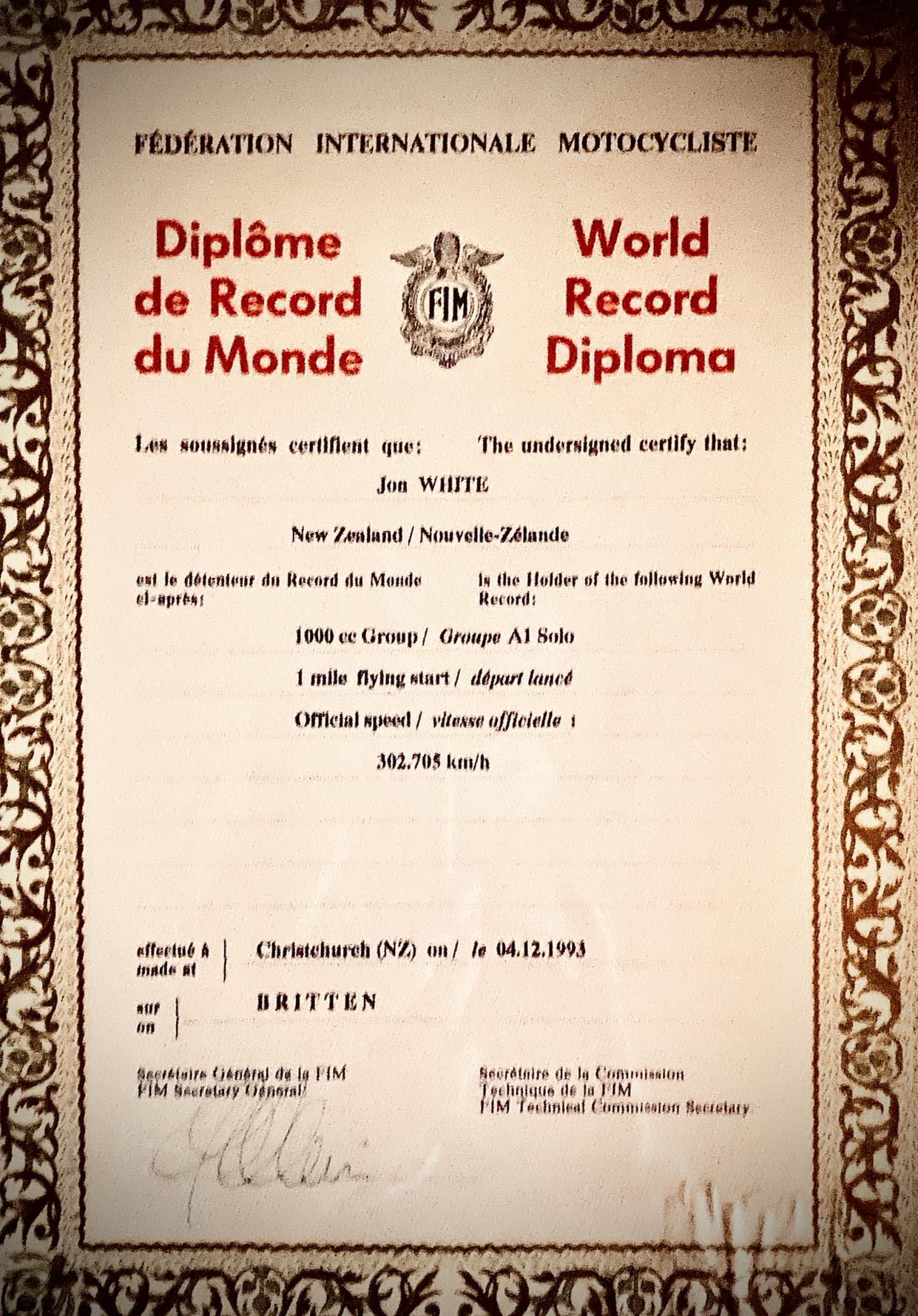
FIM World Record Diploma for the 1-mile flying start in the 1000cc category.

- FIM Flying Mile World Record (4 December 1993)
- Jon White set the world flying mile record for motorcycles under 1000cc in 1993, reaching 188.092 mph (302.705 km/h) on a Britten V1000. This official world record remains unbroken. White also held the NZ Open Flying 1/4 Mile record at 187.96 mph on a Britten V1000 until 2000 when J. Hepburn surpassed it in Southland. White also held the NZ 1050cc Flying 1/4 Mile record at 188.092 mph for 28 years until W. Rands-Trevor broke it in 2021 in Reporoa. In 2022, Rands-Trevor claimed the NZ Open Flying 1/4 Mile record from Hepburn.
- MNZ National Speed Records Flying kilometer (4 December 1993) Jon White set the NZ 1050cc Flying Kilometer and NZ Open Flying Kilometer records at 188.092 mph on December 4, 1993, in Christchurch New Zealand. Both records remain unbroken.
- World standing start 1/4-mile (400 m) record (1000cc)
- 134.617 km/h
- World standing start mile record (1000cc)
- 213.512 km/h
- World standing start kilometre record (1000cc)
- 186.245 km/h

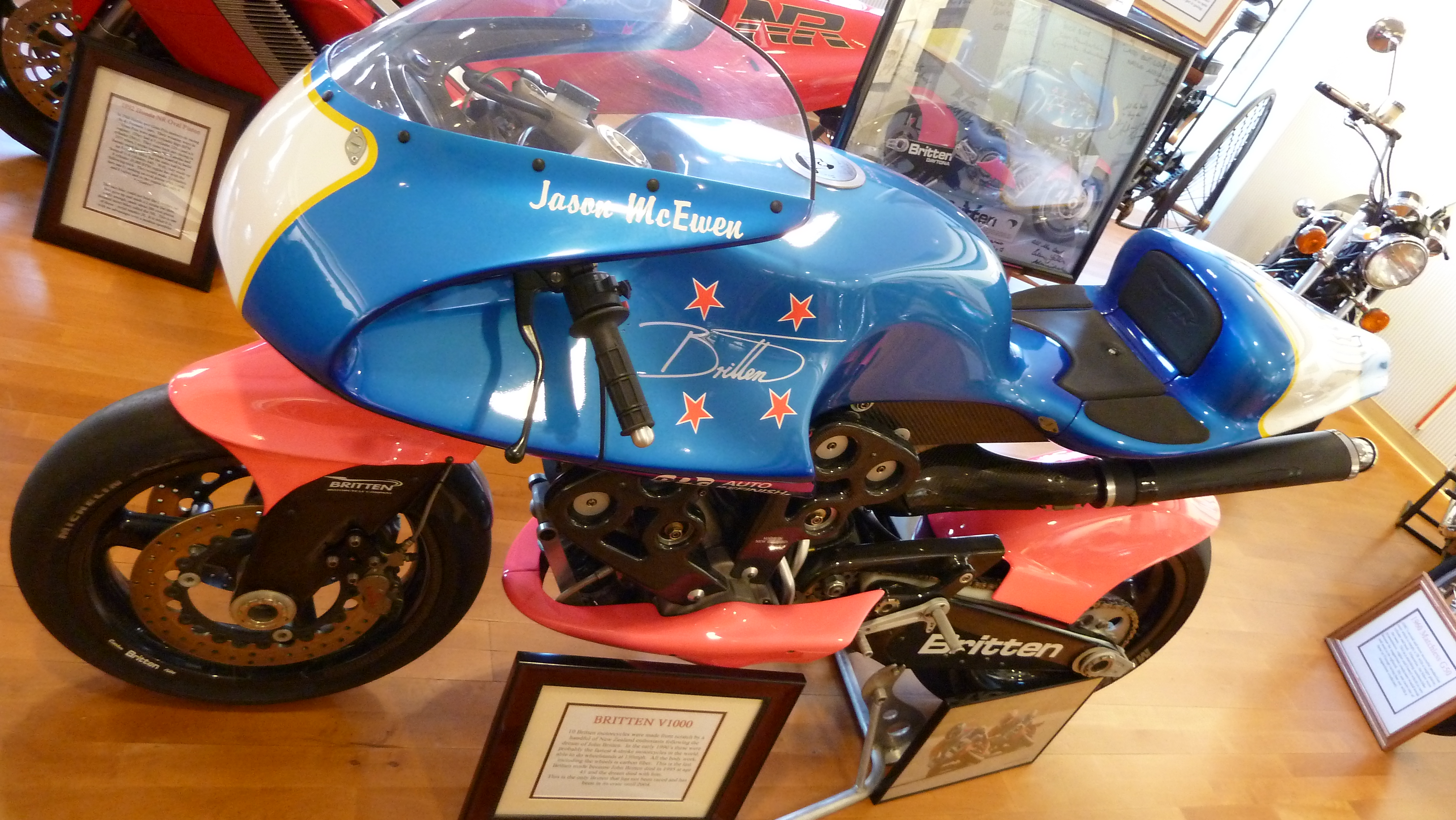
Jason McEwen's 1994 Britten V1000 on display in the Solvang Vintage Motorcycle Museum

=== 1994 ===
- 1st Battle of the Twins, Daytona, USA
- 1st and 2nd New Zealand National Superbike Championship

=== 1995 ===
- 1st World BEARs, rider, Andrew Stroud
