= Vincent Grey Flash =

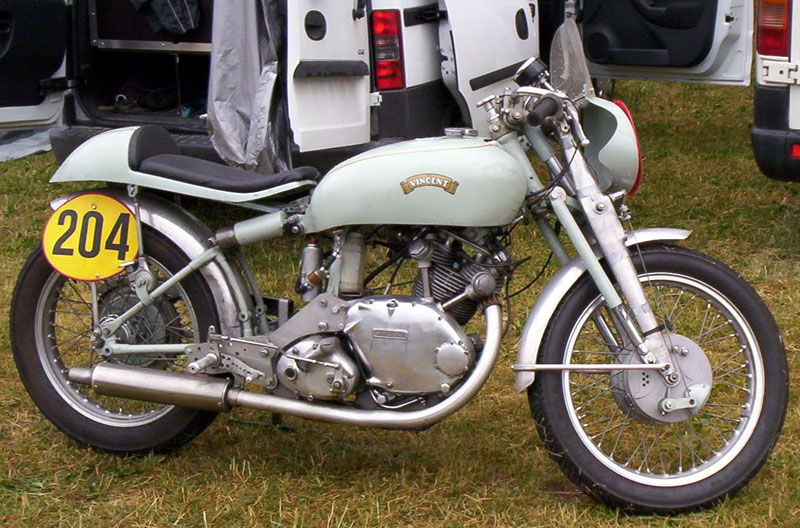
- Manufacturer: Vincent HRD Co. Ltd Stevenage
- Also called: Series C
- Production: 1949–1952
- Predecessor: Vincent Comet
- Engine: 499 cc four stroke single
- Power: 35 bhp at 6,200 rpm
- Suspension: 'Girdraulic' oil damped (front) cantilever monoshock (rear)
- Tyres: Front tyre 3.00 x 21in., Rear tyre 3.50 x 20in.
- Wheelbase: 55.75 inches (1,416 mm)
- Weight: 330 pounds (150 kg) (dry)

The Vincent Grey Flash is a British motorcycle made between 1949 and 1952 by Vincent Motorcycles. Advertised as "By Black Lightning out of Comet" this 500cc single racer is very rare as only 31 were produced.

== Development ==
Vincents had a close association with motorcycle racing and the Phil Irving designed Vincent Comet provided the basis for the Series C 499cc Grey Flash racer. Tuned and stripped down to 330 lb (150 kg) as a 500 cc version of the 1,000 cc Vincent Black Lightning, the new 'Flash' was capable of 115 mph with a power output of 35 bhp 6,200 rpm.

Prototypes were raced in late 1949 and the last model was produced in 1952. The small numbers produced mean that there was plenty of variation of the specification. Earlier models were finished with chrome on the fuel tank and lower fork link but towards the end of production in 1952 this was replaced by grey paint. As well as the Burman BAR gearbox, Vincent also experimented with AJS 7R gearboxes but used Albion gearboxes for most of the machines produced.

== Variants ==
The Grey Flash was produced in Racing, Dual Purpose and Road models, as well as Show models and a number of 'TT specials'.

== Production ==
There is a debate about the number of Vincent Grey Flash motorcycles produced as although the official register lists thirty one, several are known to have been rebuilt. Many surviving Grey Flash motorcycles have been raced and modified to meet changing racing regulations or have been restored using the higher specification of the special show and TT machines for reference, so 'correct' examples are very rare.

== Racing success ==
When he was 16 world champion racer John Surtees was an apprentice at the Vincent factory. He made his first headlines in 1951 when he gave Norton star Geoff Duke a strong challenge in an ACU race at the Thruxton Circuit In 1952 John Surtees set a new lap record on his first outing of the season at Brands Hatch and throughout the early 1950s was virtually unbeatable on his Vincent Grey Flash racer.

== Museum exhibits ==
The National Motorcycle Museum (UK) has a fully restored Vincent Grey Flash which features a special large-capacity fuel tank designed for the Isle of Man TT, which Vincent contested with four special Grey Flashes in 1950.

The Solvang Vintage Motorcycle Museum in Solvang, California also has one of the four 1950 TT Racers which was owned by Ted Davis, Vincent's Chief Engineer. The exhibited bike has an experimental larger valve head and a large aluminium crank pin. Only one of the four Grey Flashes, (ridden by works racer Ken Bills), finished the race in 12th place.

The Australian National Motor Museum of road transport history in Birdwood, South Australia has a 1950 Grey Flash.

== See also ==
- List of motorcycles of the 1940s
- List of motorcycles of the 1950s
