= Vincent Motorcycles =

British motorcycle manufacturer

Vincent Engineers Ltd

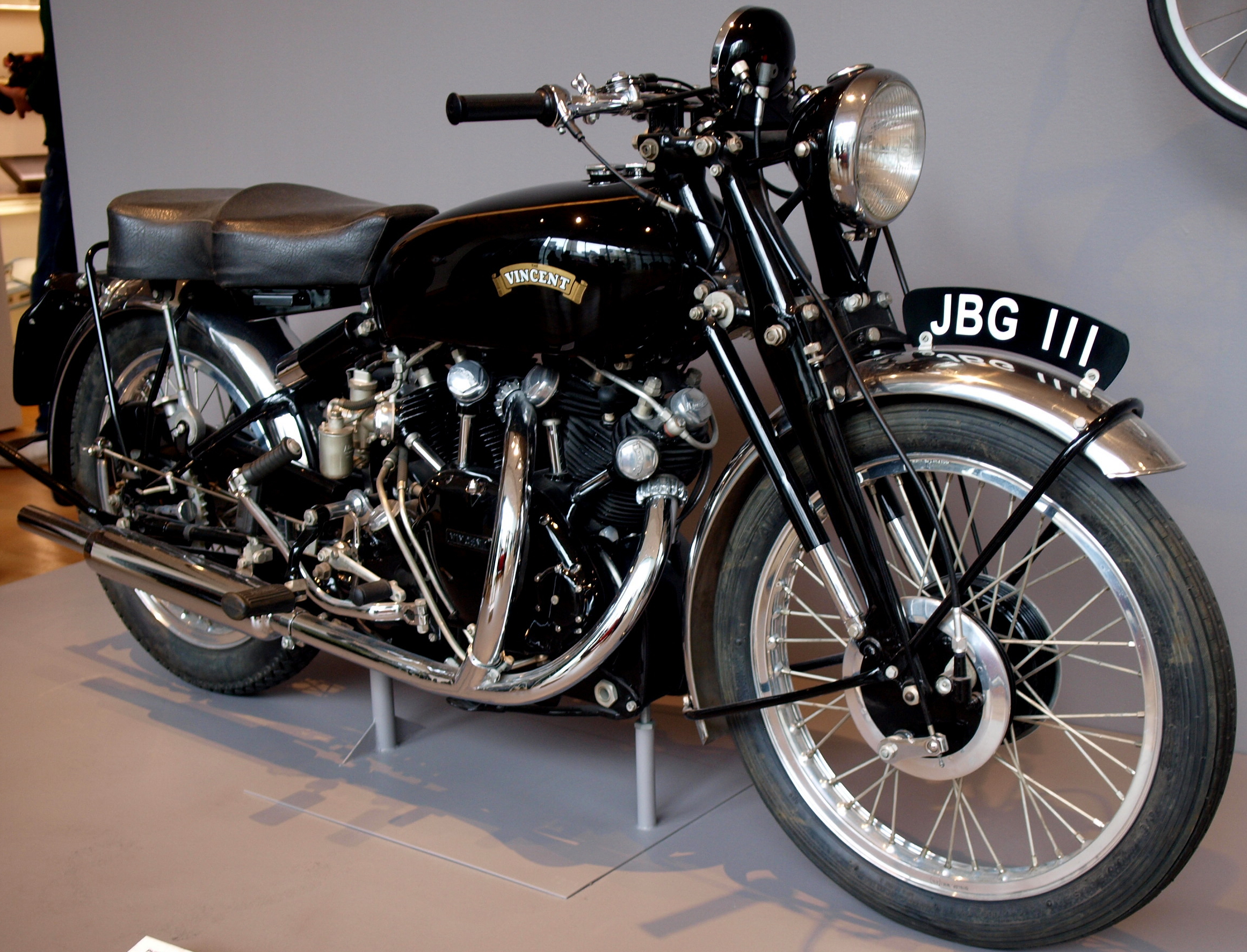
- Vincent Series C Black Shadow
- Trade name: Vincent Engineers (Stevenage) Ltd.
- Formerly: Vincent HRD
- Industry: Manufacturing and engineering
- Founded: 1928
- Founder: Philip Vincent
- Defunct: 1959
- Fate: Bankrupt
- Successor: Harper Engineering (Stevenage)
- Headquarters: Stevenage, Hertfordshire, England
- Key people: Phil Irving (designer and development engineer); Ted Davis (chief tester); George Brown (tester)
- Products: Motorcycles, three-wheelers, pumps, amphibious vehicles, drones

Vincent Motorcycles was a British manufacturer of motorcycles from 1928 to 1955. The business was established by Philip Vincent who bought an existing manufacturing name HRD, initially renaming it as Vincent HRD, producing his own motorcycles as HRD did previously with engines purchased as complete assemblies from other companies. From 1934, two new engines were developed as single cylinder in 500 cc and v-twin 1,000 cc capacities. Production grew from 1936, with the most-famous models being developed from the original designs after the War period in the late 1940s.

The 1948 Vincent Black Shadow was at the time the world's fastest production motorcycle. The name was changed to Vincent Engineers (Stevenage) Ltd. in 1952 after financial losses were experienced when releasing capital to produce a Vincent-engined prototype Indian (Vindian) for the US market during 1949. In 1955 the company discontinued motorcycle production after experiencing further heavy financial losses.

== History ==
Vincent Motorcycles, "the makers of the world's fastest motorcycles", began with the purchase of HRD Motors Ltd less the factory premises, by Philip Vincent in May 1928.

HRD was founded by the British Royal Flying Corps (RFC) pilot, Howard Raymond Davies, who was shot down and captured by the Germans in 1917. Legend has it that it was while a prisoner of war that he conceived the idea of building his own motorcycle, and contemplated how he might achieve that. It was not until 1924 that Davies entered into partnership with E J Massey, trading as HRD Motors. Various models were produced, generally powered by J.A.P. engines.

Although HRD motorcycles won races, the company ran at a loss. In January 1928 it went into voluntary liquidation. The company was initially bought by Ernest Humphries of OK-Supreme Motors for the factory space, and the HRD name, jigs, tools, patterns, and remaining components were subsequently offered for sale again.

=== Phil Vincent ===
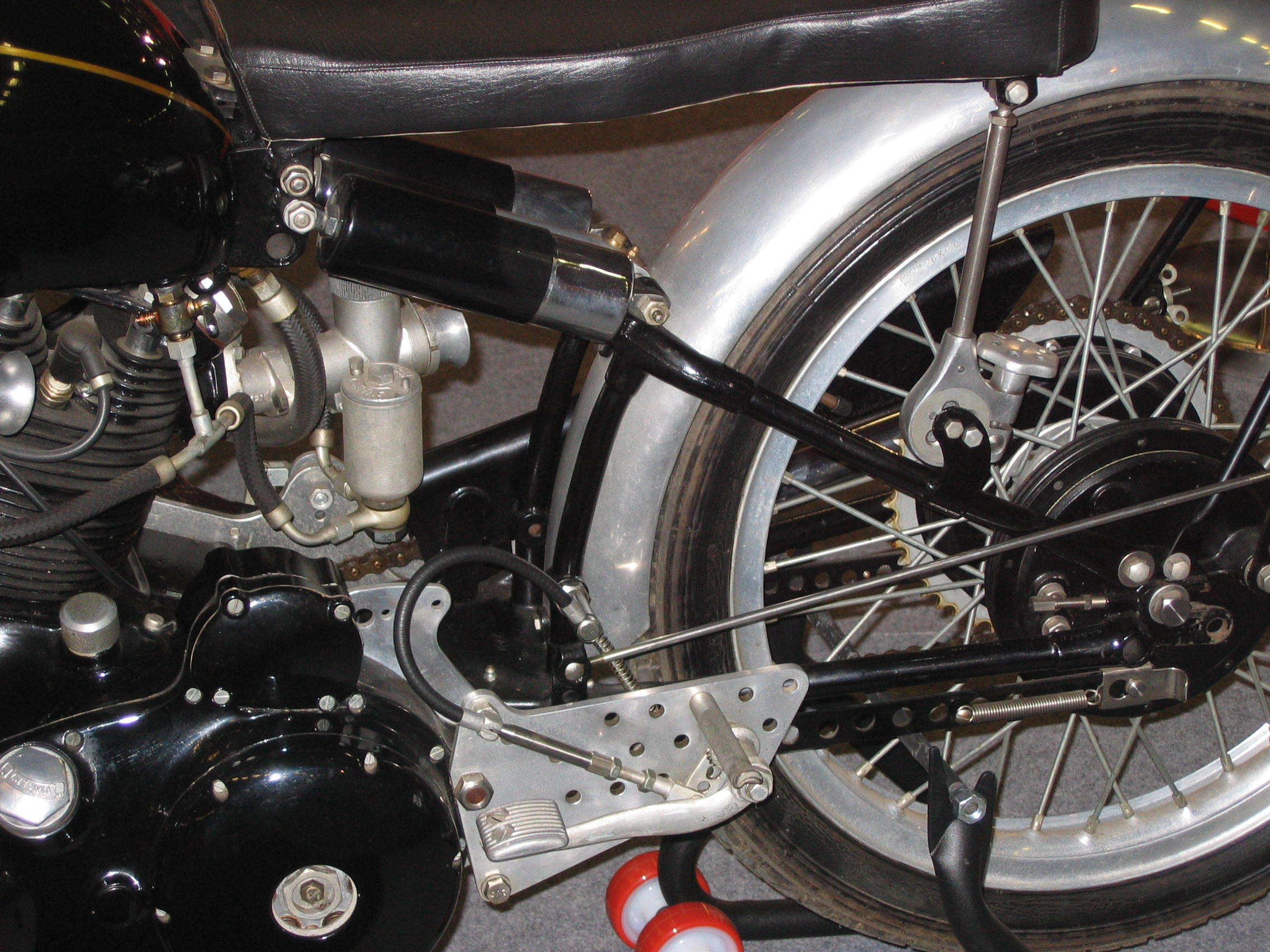
Detail of Vincent cantilever suspension

Philip Vincent was advised to start production under an established name. He had built a motorcycle of his own in 1927 and in 1928 had registered a patent for a cantilever rear suspension of his own design. With the backing of his family wealth from cattle ranching in Argentina, Vincent acquired the trademark, goodwill and remaining components of HRD from Humphries for £450 in 1928.

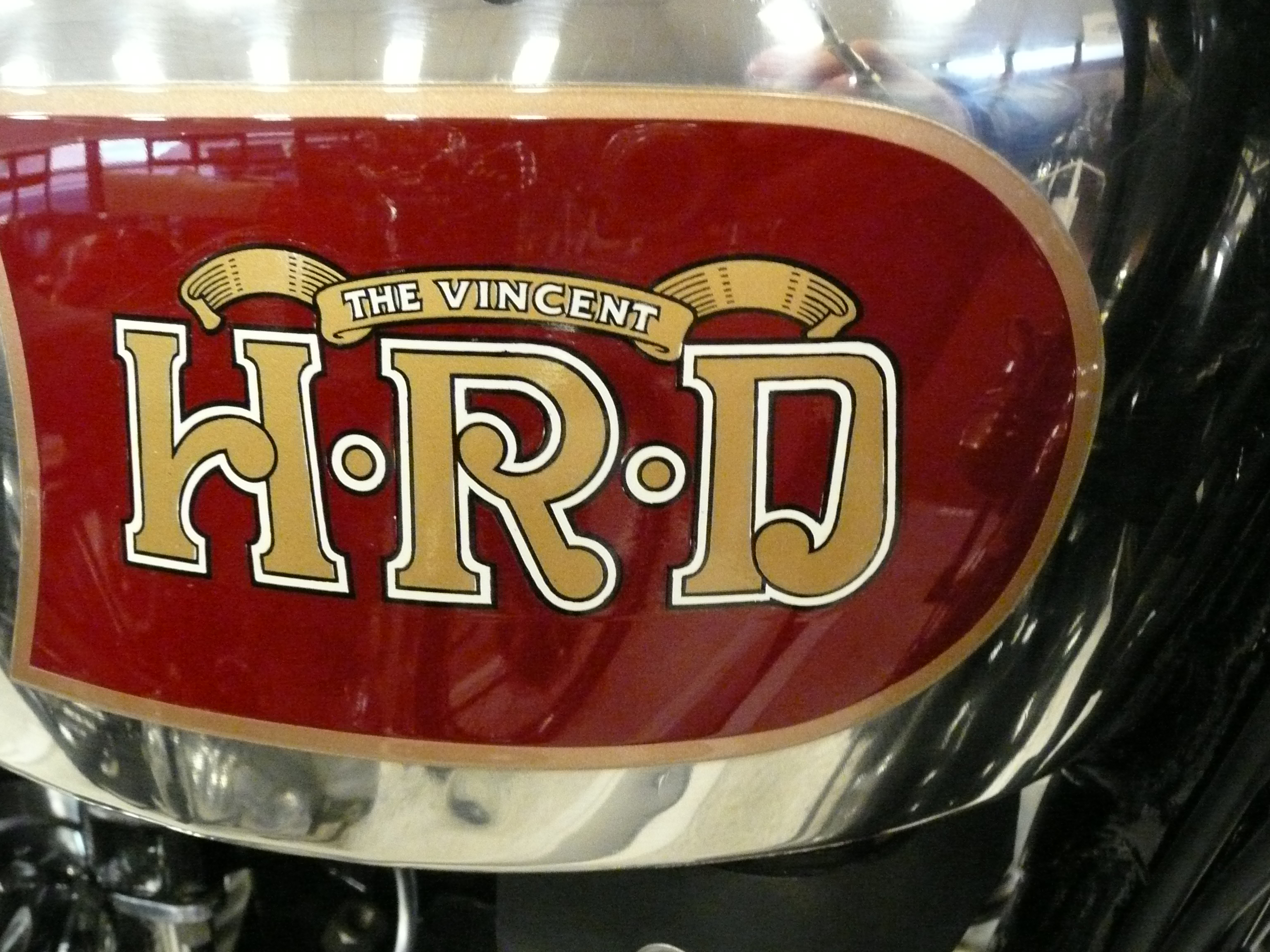

The company was promptly renamed Vincent HRD Co., Ltd and production moved to Stevenage. The new trademark had The Vincent in very small letters above the large "HRD". After World War 2 Britain had an export drive to repay its war debts, and the USA was the largest market for motorcycles, so from 1950 the HRD was dropped from the name to avoid any confusion with the "HD" of Harley Davidson, and the motorcycle became the Vincent.

In 1928 the first Vincent-HRD motorcycle used a J.A.P. single-cylinder engine in a Vincent-designed cantilever frame. The earliest known example extant exists in Canberra, Australia. Some early bikes used Rudge-Python engines. But after a disastrous 1934 Isle of Man TT, with engine problems and all three entries failing to finish, Phil Vincent and Phil Irving decided to build their own engines.

Phil Vincent also experimented with three-wheeled vehicles, amphibious vehicles, and automobiles. In 1932 the first 3-wheeler, "The Vincent Bantam" appeared, powered by a 293cc Villiers engine. It was a 2.5 cwt delivery van with a car seat and a steering wheel. The Bantam cost £57-10-0 and the windscreen and hood option cost £5-10-0. Production ceased in 1936.

=== Phil Irving ===
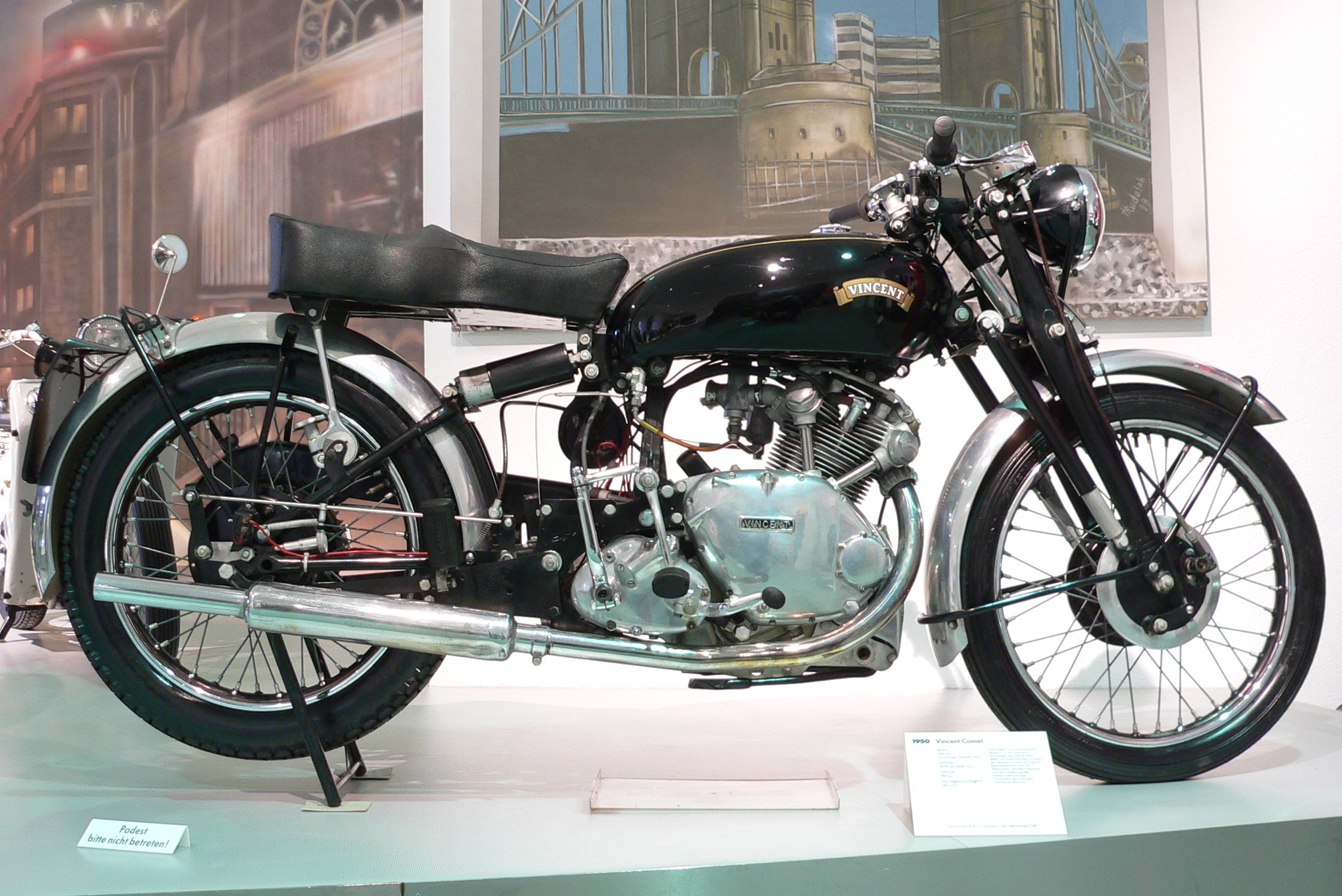
Vincent Comet from 1950 at the Deutsches Zweirad- und NSU-Museum

In late 1931 Phil Irving first joined Vincent as an engineer alongside fellow-engineer E.J. Massey from the original HRD company after initially working on metallurgy for Velocette, leaving to return to his native Australia in 1949. His first engine design was an OHV 500 cc single-cylinder engine in 1934 called the "Meteor".

== World War II ==
In 1937 Phil Irving went to work for Velocette but returned to Vincent Motorcycles in 1943. Vincent primarily made munitions, but Vincent engines were trialled in boats and portable pumps during the war, and the end of hostilities saw Vincent ready to return to motorcycle production. Vincent developed a highly efficient opposed-piston two-stroke engine for use in air-dropped lifeboats, although development outlasted the war and it never went into service.

Vincent already looked to the United States for sales, and in 1944 Eugene Aucott opened the first USA dealership in the city of Philadelphia. Others followed.

== Models ==
=== Meteor and Comet ===
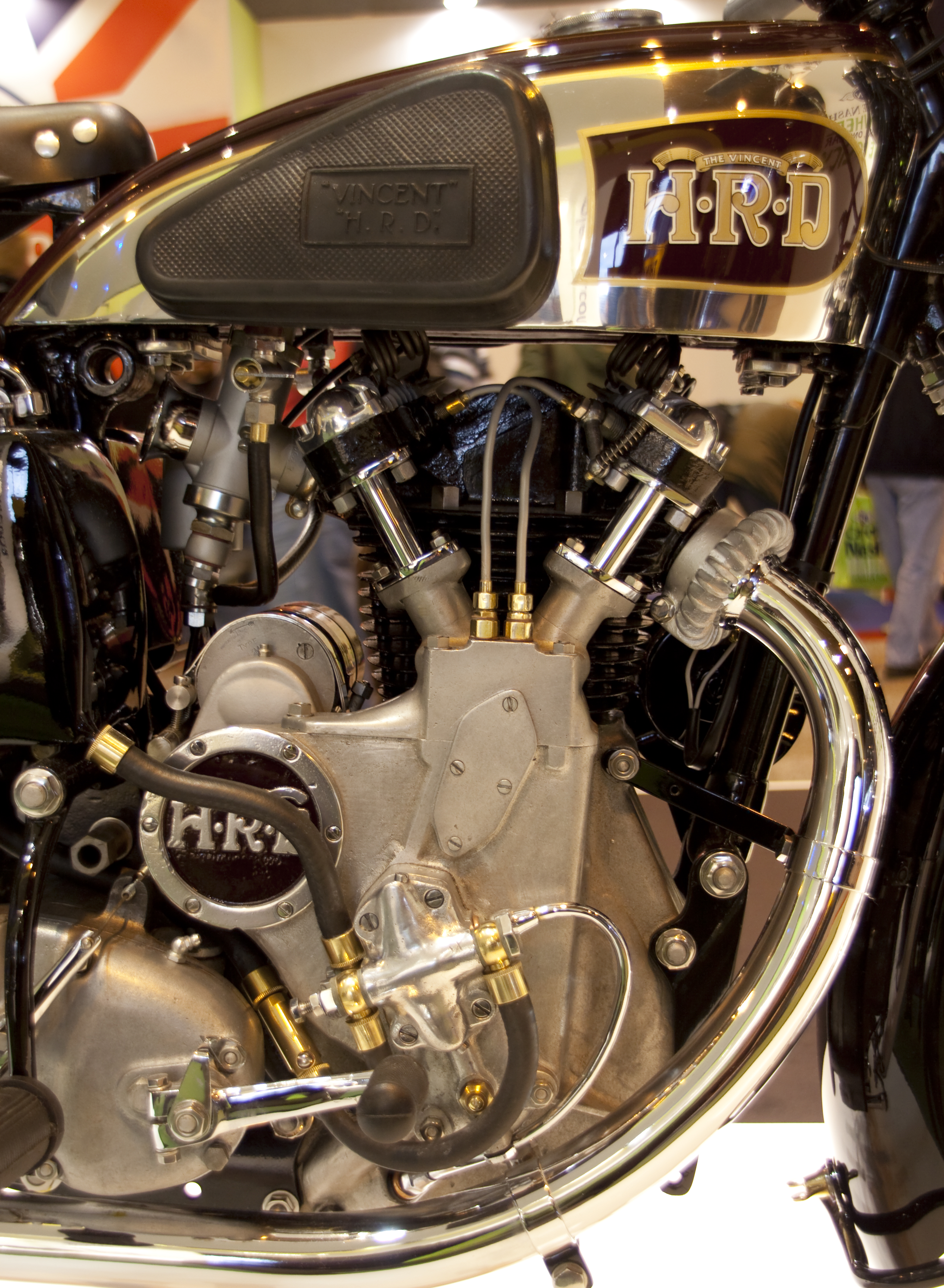
Vincent HRD

The standard machine was known as the Meteor and the sports machine was the Comet; it was distinguished from earlier Vincent models of that name by the "Series-A" prefix. There was a TT replica & the Comet Special (basically a TTR with lights, horn etc.), which used a bronze head. The Meteor engine produced 26 bhp (19 kW) @ 5300 rpm.

An unusual feature of the valve design for these engines was the double valve guides, and the attachment of the forked rocker arm to a shoulder between the guides, to eliminate side forces on the valve stem and ensure maximum valve life under racing conditions.

The Series-A Comet could do 90 mph (140 km/h), but Phil Vincent and his racing customers wanted more.

=== 1936 Series A Rapide ===
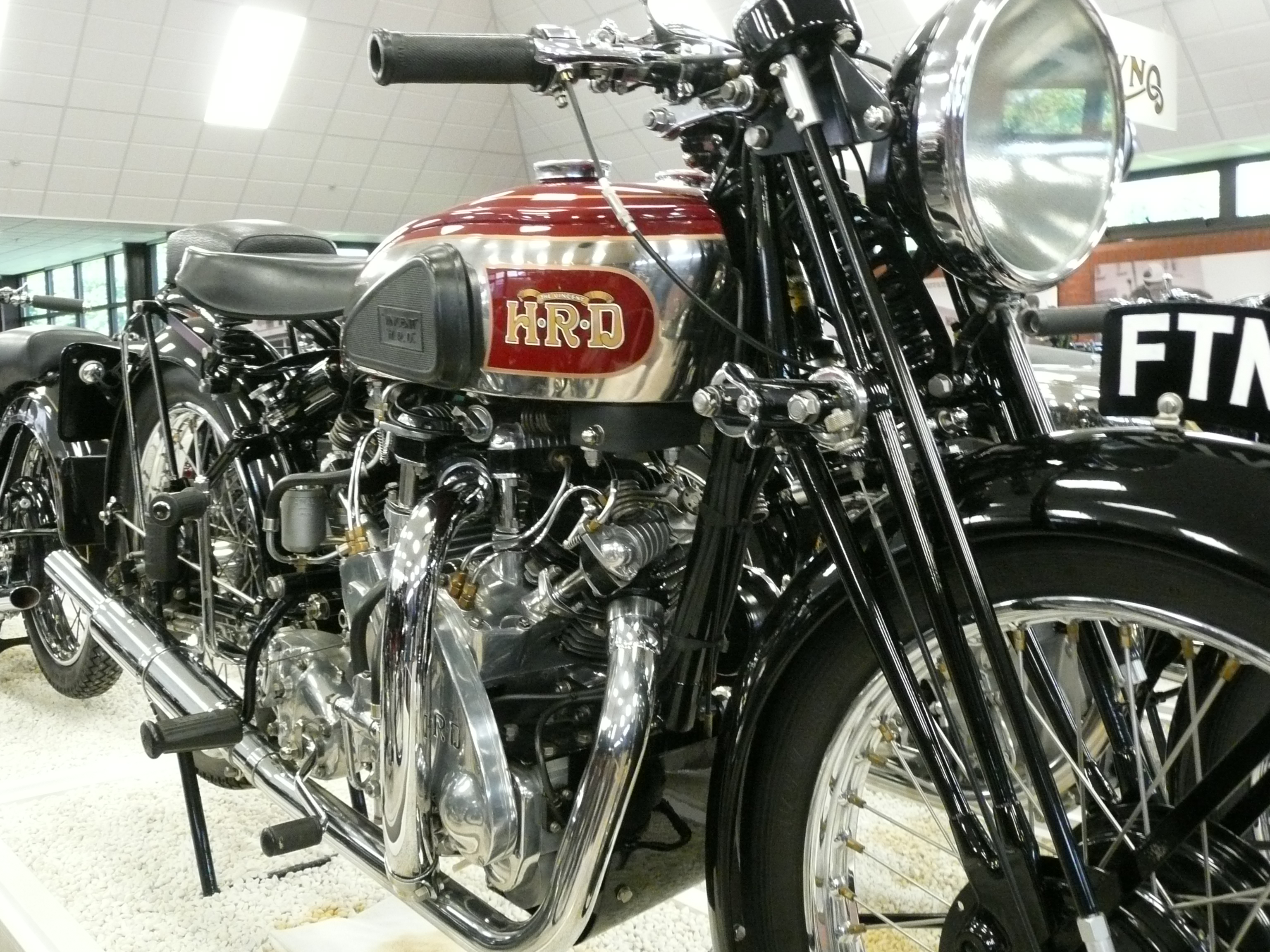
Vincent Series 'A' Rapide

Whilst working in his office at Stevenage in 1936, Phil Irving noticed that two drawings of the Vincent HRD engine lay on top of each other in a "V" formation. He set them out on the drawing board as a v-twin engine in a frame Vincents had made for a record attempt by Eric Fernihough, who no longer required it. When Phil Vincent saw the drawing he was immediately enthusiastic, and a few weeks later the first Vincent thousand had been made, with Meteor upper engine parts mounted on new crankcases. The Vincent V-twin motorcycle incorporated a number of new and innovative ideas, some of which were more successful than others.

The Vincent HRD Series A Rapide was introduced in October 1936. Its frame was of brazed lug construction, based on the Comet design but extended to accommodate the longer V twin engine. It continued the use of "cantilever" rear suspension, which was used on all Vincents produced from 1928 until 1955. Other innovations included a side stand.

Innovative telescopic forks were not adopted by Vincent, with both Phils believing girder forks were superior at the time and beyond. The Series-A had external oil lines – known as "the plumber's nightmare" – and a separate gearbox.

With 6.8:1 compression ratio, the 998 cc Series A Rapide Vincent produced 45 hp (34 kW), and was capable of 110 mph (180 km/h). The high power meant that the Burman clutch and gearbox transmission did not cope well.

=== 1946 Series B Rapide ===
The Series B Rapide designed during the war and released to the press before end of hostilities looked radically different from the A. The oil pipes were now internal. Unit construction allowed Vincent to combine the engine and gearbox into a single casing. Philip Vincent summarised his frame design philosophy in his memoirs, writing "What isn't present takes up no space, cannot bend, and weighs nothing — so eliminate the frame tubes!" The angle between the cylinders was changed to 50° from the 47.5° of the Series A engine to allow the engine to be installed as a stressed member. This enabled Vincent to reduce the frame to an upper frame member (UFM) that was a steel box-section backbone that doubled as an oil tank, and to which the front headlug and rear suspension were attached. Brakes were dual single-leading shoe (SLS), front and rear. The 56.5 in (1,440 mm) wheelbase was 1.5 in (38 mm) shorter than the Series A, and its dimensions were closer to contemporary 500 cc bikes.

The Series B had a Feridax Dunlopillo Dualseat, and a tool tray under the front.

The Series "B" incorporated an internal felt oil filter instead of the metal gauze of the Series "A".

Vincent used quickly detachable wheels, making wheel and tyre changes easier. The rear wheel was reversible, and different size rear sprockets could be fitted for quick final-drive ratio changes. The brake & gear shift were adjustable for reach to suit individual feet. The rear mud guard was hinged to facilitate the removal of the rear wheel.

From today's perspective, it seems incongruous that Vincent could see the need for, and design, a cantilever rear suspension, as well as incorporate so many other new ideas, yet use Brampton girder forks with friction dampers up front. The two Phils felt that the telescopic forks of the time were prone to lateral flex, so they persisted with girder forks, and did use hydraulic damping in the Series C "Girdraulic" forks.

Starting in 1948, Indian Motorcycles distributed Vincents in the United States along with other British motorcycles including AJS, Royal Enfield, Matchless and Norton. That same year an Indian Chief was sent to Stevenage to be fitted with a Vincent Rapide engine. The resulting hybrid Vindian did not go into production.

=== 1948 Series C Vincents ===
Black Shadow and Black Lightning

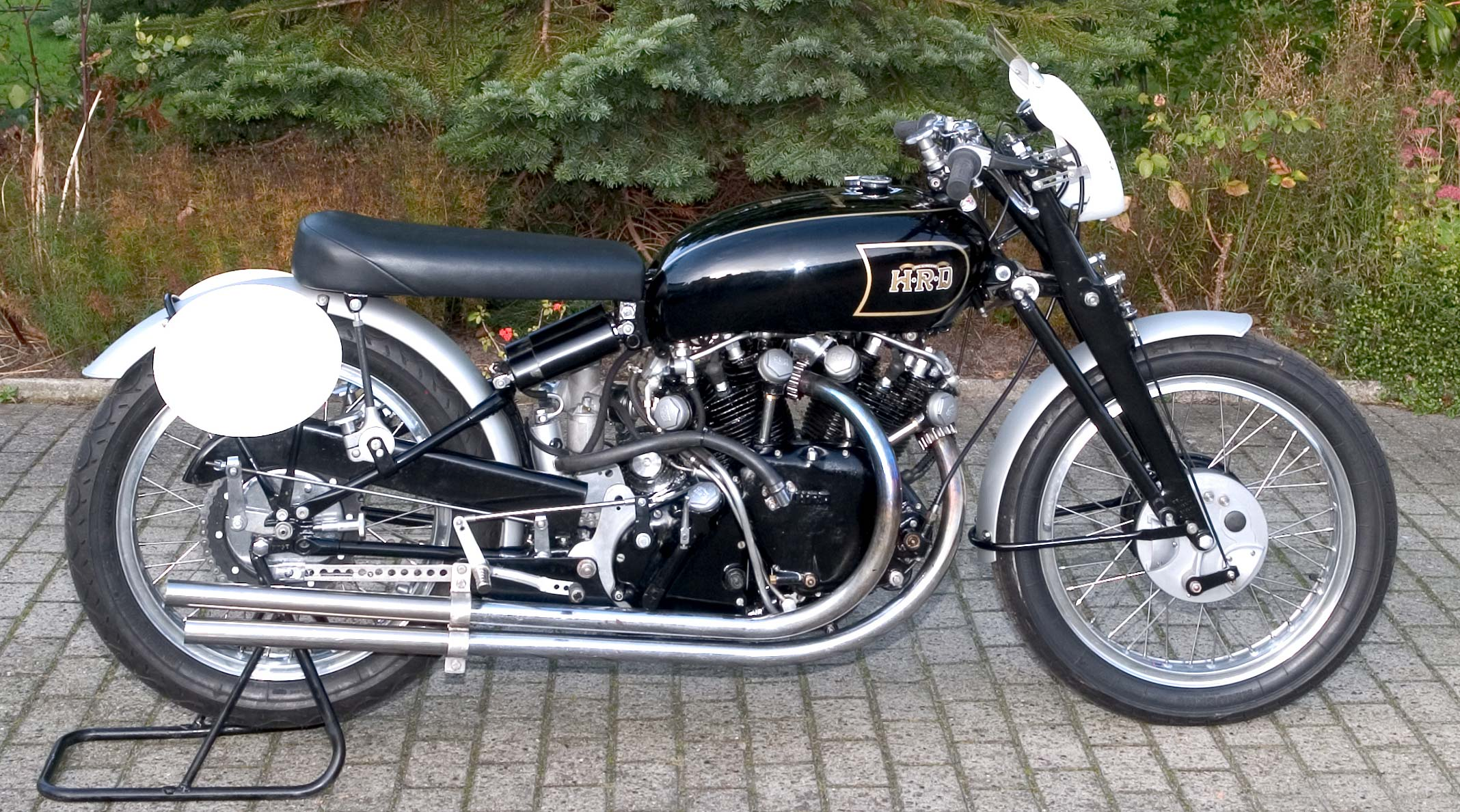
Vincent Black Lightning from 1950 at the Zweirad-Museum Neckarsulm

The 1948 Series C Rapide differed from the Series B in having "Girdraulic" front forks – which were girder forks with hydraulic damping. By 1950, the Series C had a 998 cc, 50° V-twin that put out 45 to 55 hp (34 to 41 kW), depending on the state of tune, either Rapide or Black Shadow.

The Black Shadow, capable of 125 mph (201 km/h), and easily recognised by the black coating on the engine and gearbox unit known as Pylumin, and large 150 mph (240 km/h) speedometer, was introduced. The engine produced 54 bhp (40 kW) @ 5700 rpm in Black Shadow trim.

The Black Lightning was a racing version of the Black Shadow; every necessary steel part on it that could be was remade in aluminium, and anything not essential was removed altogether. These changes helped reduce the weight from 458 lb (208 kg) to 380 lb (170 kg). Every bit the racer, it had a single racing seat and rear-set footrests.

Rollie Free during his US record breaking run in 1948

Rolland "Rollie" Free (18 November 1900 – 11 October 1984) was a motorcycle racer best known for breaking the US motorcycle land speed record in 1948 on the Bonneville Salt Flats, Utah on a Vincent Black Lightning. The picture of Free, prone and wearing a bathing suit, has been described as the most famous picture in motorcycling, and Russell Wright won another World Land Speed Record at Swannanoa with a Vincent HRD motorcycle in 1955 at 185.15 mph (297.97 km/h).

The 500 cc Meteor and Comet singles were introduced, along with a 500 cc racer, the Vincent Grey Flash. The Grey Flash racer used Albion gears, for the greater choice of ratios available. The 500 cc bikes used a wet multiplate clutch, while the 998 cc V-twins used a dry, drum-type servo clutch.

Most Vincents had black tanks and frames. In 1949 a White Shadow (a machine to Black Shadow mechanical specification, but with silver engine casings) was available, but only 15 were sold, and the option was dropped in 1952. In 1950 16 Red Comets were shipped to the United States. There were also 31 of the 1948 Grey Flash built.

During the Korean War nickel chrome steel was officially regulated, meaning the correct materials for some components (e.g. gears) were not available. Some motorcycles built during this period had black rims.

From 1950, HRD was dropped from the name, and the logo now simply read The Vincent.

=== 1954 Series D Vincents ===
The Series D was a natural progression of upgraded machine specification with a modifications to the rear subframe, suspension, seat arrangement and with a new hand-operated stand.

Additional new models were created introduced by fitting some machines with a fibreglass handlebar fairing having a tall screen and matching front legshields and long side enclosures, creating streamlining to improve rider comfort. Named Victor (based on the Comet), Black Knight (based on the Rapide) and Black Prince (based on the Shadow), they were poorly received by the public and suffered delays in production when waiting for the new bodywork to be supplied with an acceptable paint finish.

Sales declined further after the post-war motorcycling boom owing to the availability of cheaper motor cars, a little over 500 "Series D" models were made in total. All motorcycle production ceased in December 1955.

=== Fireflys, three wheelers, and NSU ===
The Firefly was a 45 cc "clip on" engined bicycle built from 1953 to 1955 under licence from Miller, who were suppliers of electrical components to Vincent. It was also known as the Vincent Power Cycle.

By 1954, Vincent Motorcycles was in an increasingly difficult situation. In the quest for solvency, Vincent looked for ways to improve their position. The trike idea was revived. In 1932 "The Vincent Bantam" was first introduced: Vincent's first 3-wheeler, powered by a 293 cc SV JAP or 250 cc Villiers engine, was a 2.5 cwt delivery van which used a car seat and steering wheel rather than the standard motorcycle saddle and handlebars. The Bantam was priced at £57-10-0 with a windscreen and hood available for an additional £5-10-0. It ceased production in 1936 – the first year of the Series A motorcycle.

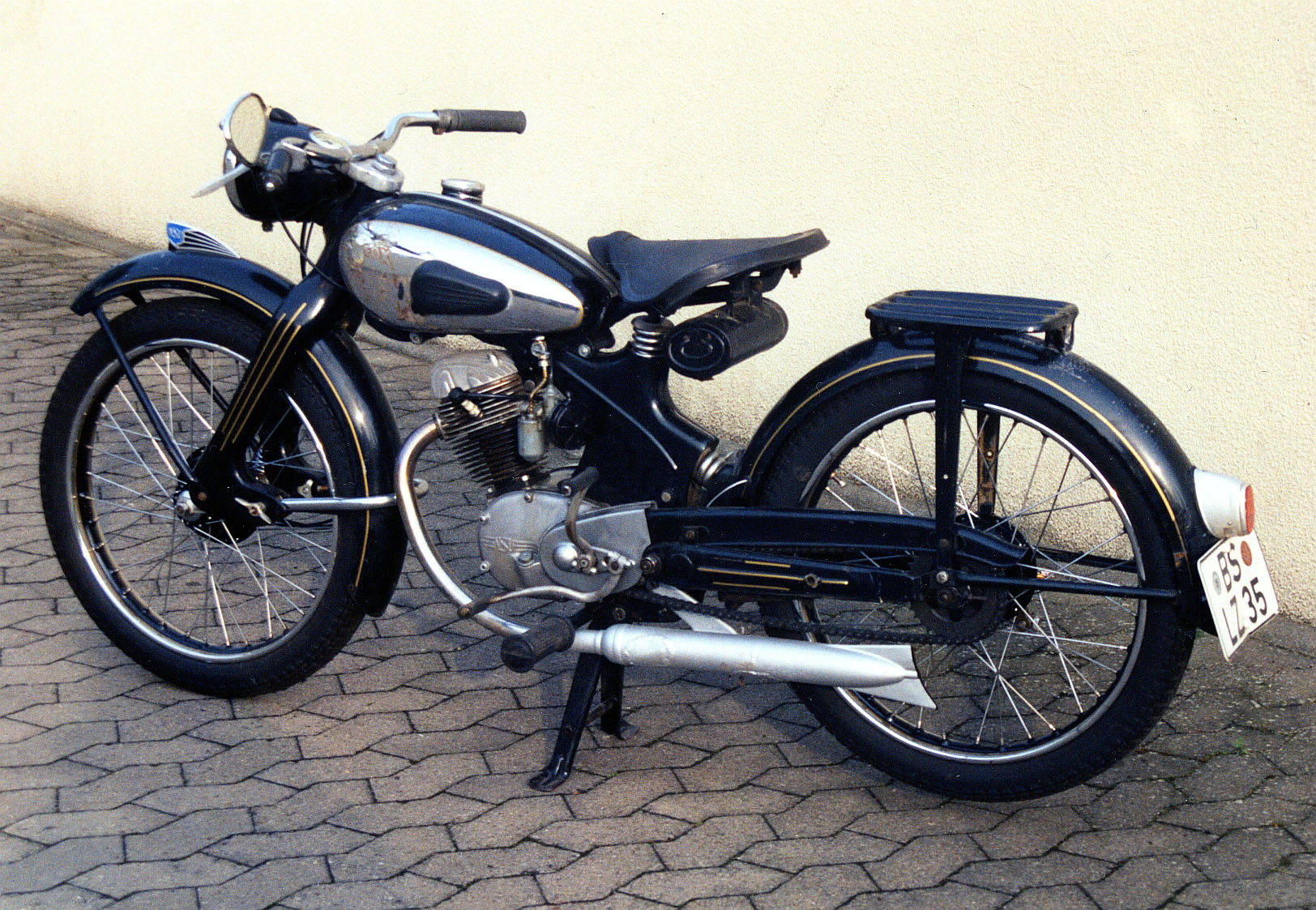
NSU-Vincent Fox

In 1954/1955, due to falling sales of motorcycles, the prototype 3-wheeler powered by a Vincent Rapide 998 cc engine was produced. Some years later, the vehicle was named "Polyphemus" by its owner, Roy Harper. To keep development and production costs low, it used a parts-bin approach, including pieces from Vincent motorcycles, as well as wheels which came from a Morris Minor. The body was made from 16-gauge aluminium. With the standard Rapide engine, "Polyphemus" could reach 90 mph (140 km/h). Before it was sold, in the hands of Ted Davis, it achieved 117 mph (188 km/h) with a Black Lightning engine. The "Vincent 3-wheeler" was eventually sold to a member of the public for £500 – a high price for any vehicle at the time, especially for a vehicle with no reverse gear, self-starter or hood. The BMC Mini launched four years later at a price of £497.

Unfortunately Vincent motorcycles were hand-built and expensive – only a total of 11,000 machines were sold post–World War Two. A sales slump in 1954 forced the company to import and sell NSU mopeds. One hundred and sixty two-stroke Foxes NSU-Vincent 123 cc were built. There were also 40 98cc OHV four-stroke NSU-Vincents, and Vincent also sold the "NSU Quickly" moped; too well it appears (selling about 20,000 in one year – a footnote to how the market had changed again), as NSU took control of its own sales after a year.

== Vincent Picador ==
In an attempt to diversify the company, Phil Vincent undertook development of a version of the motorcycle V-twin for aircraft applications. Development of this engine, named Picador, began in 1951 and continued until 1954, diverting funds from the motorcycle product line.

The Picador was intended to power ultra-light aircraft. In particular the engine was to be used in the ML Aviation U120D Queen Bee pilotless target drone. To qualify for the government contract the motor had to be capable of passing prolonged full power operation tests.

Initially built to Black Lightning specifications, the engine followed typical Vincent practice, with two air-cooled cylinders in a 50° V-formation and with the cylinders offset to improve cooling of the rear cylinder's exhaust valve. The engine displacement was 998 cc (60.9 cu in), and it weighed 200 lb (91 kg), with a power output of 65 hp (48 kW) @ 5000 rpm. The valves were operated by rockers and short pushrods driven by two camshafts mounted high in the engine's timing case, an arrangement euphemistically called "semi-overhead camshafts". The Picador motor was upgraded with a larger principal driveshaft, different big-ends, Scintilla magneto, and a double speed oil pump. To prevent fuel starvation during the U120D's rocket-assisted launch when accelerations of 10Gs would be generated, mechanical fuel injection driven from the propeller shaft replaced the usual carburettors. Unusually for an aircraft engine, the engine was mounted with the crankshaft transverse, although in the Queen Bee drone the engine was rotated 180° from its motorcycle applications, with the exhaust ports at the rear. An oilbath chain primary drive and a bevel gear drove the propeller with a 2:1 reduction from the engine speed.

Due to ML Aviation's inability to deliver a working radio control system, Vincent did not win the contract.

Russel Wright's record breaking bike was fitted with a Picador crank and oil pump, by Vincent, while in England for Earls Court, shortly after the 1955 record attempt.

== "The Last" Vincent motorcycle ==
At the annual dinner of the Vincent H.R.D. Owners Club in the summer of 1955, Phil Vincent announced that the company could no longer continue in the face of heavy losses and that production of motorcycles would cease almost immediately. In 1955, one week before Christmas, the last Vincent came off the production line.

== Post-motorcycle manufacturing ==
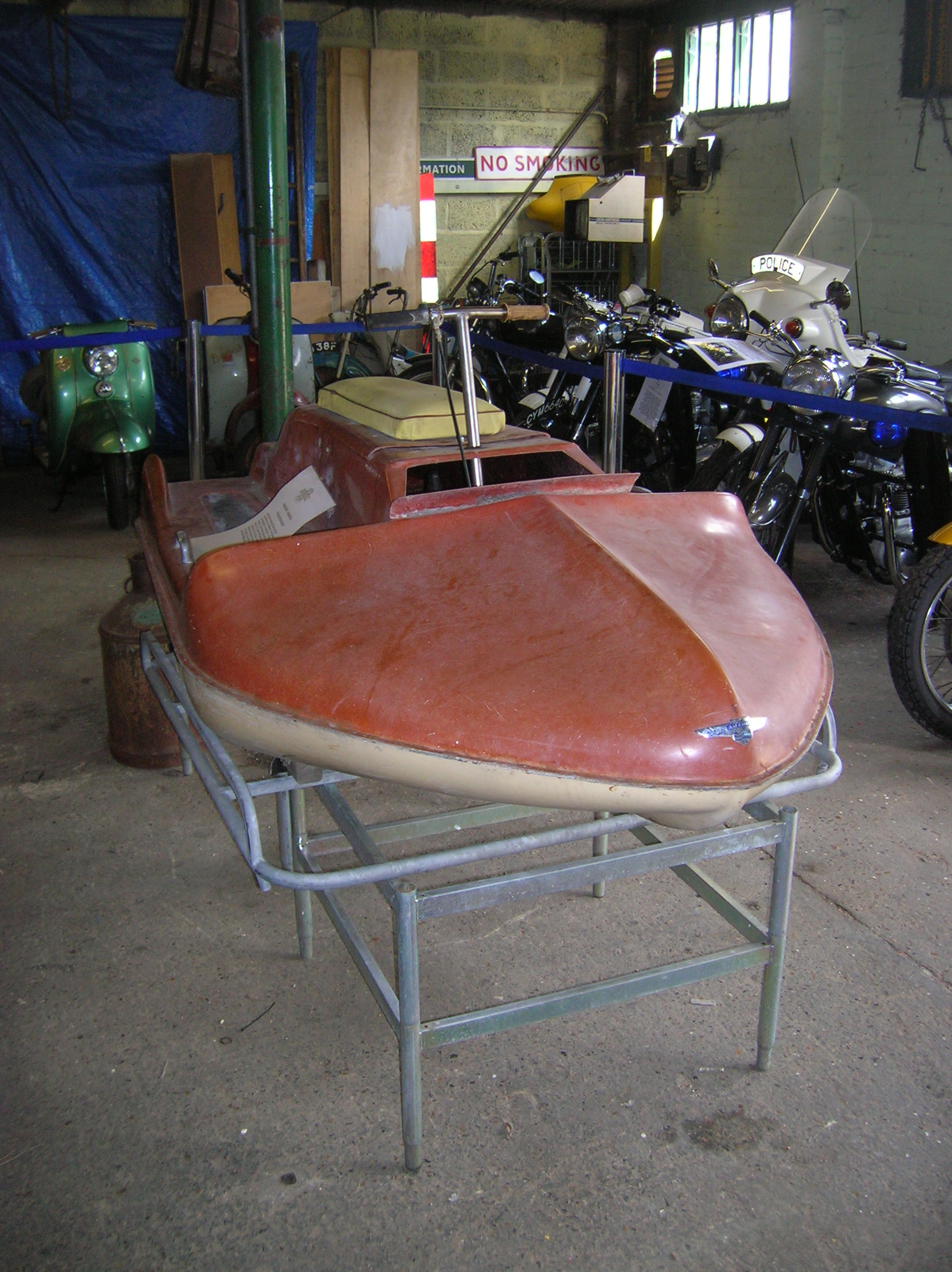
Vincent Amanda watercraft at the London Motorcycle Museum

The factory then turned to general engineering, the manufacture of industrial engines, and there was the Amanda water scooter. A Vincent engineer lost his life testing it, drowning at sea.

The company went into receivership in 1959. The name and motorcycle component manufacturing rights were taken over by a local business, Harper Engines Ltd., of Stevenage, Herts., and has since been bought and sold by other engineering firms. In the early 1970s the Vincent Owners Club created via public subscription the VOC Spares Company Ltd to ensure continued availability of spares. The company is independent of the club who retain a majority share holding.

== Subsequent developments ==
=== Norvin ===
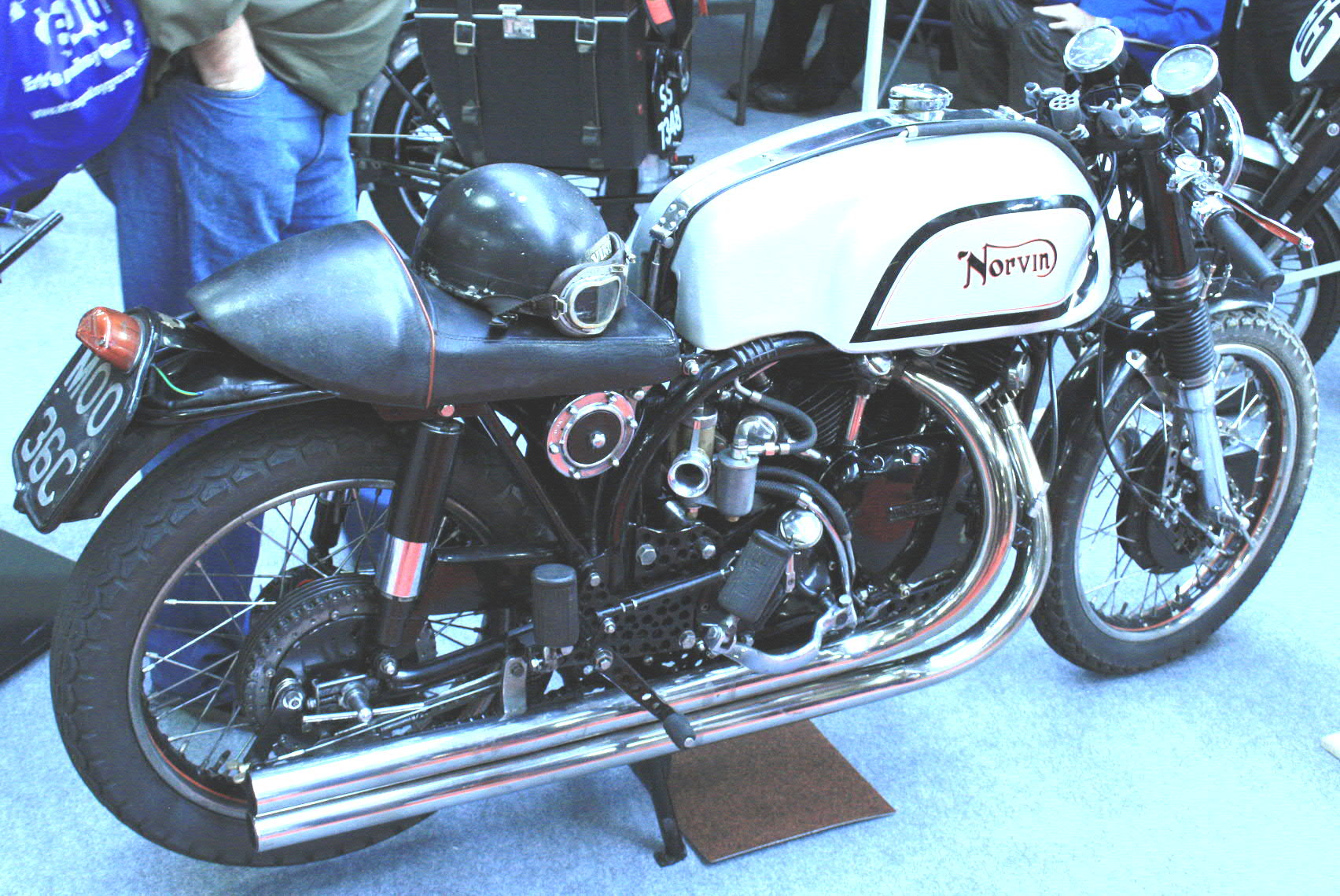
Norvin in traditional 1960s style showing Shadow engine finish in a Manx Norton frame, forks, swinging arm and wheels with rear hub reversed to suit the Vincent timing–side final drive

Vincent engines have been fitted to other frames. The most common was the Norvin, using a Norton Featherbed frame. Other names were used, including Vincent–Norton, Vinton, and Vin–Nor.

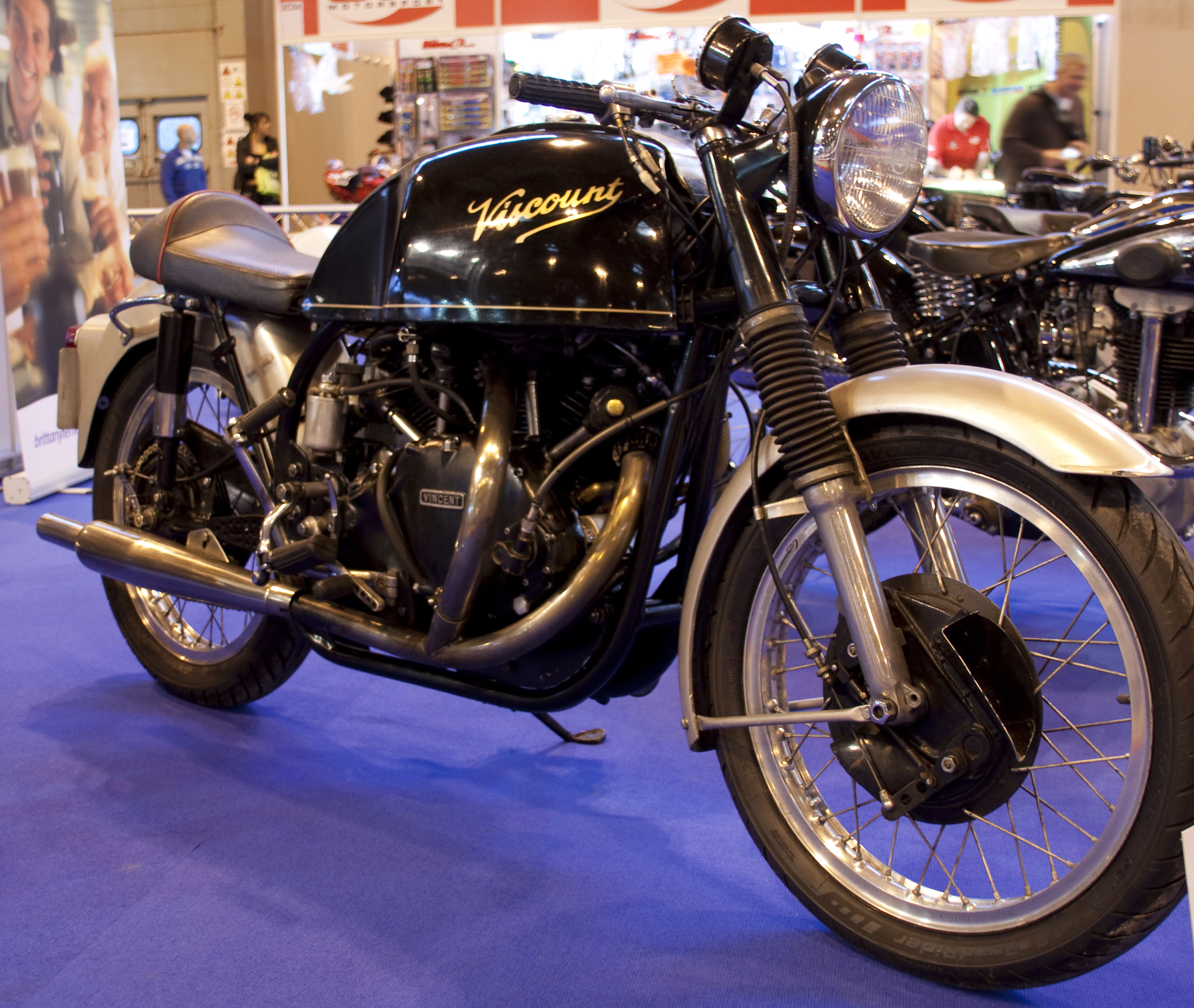
Somerton Viscount 998 cc Norvin with Manx Norton frame, swinging arm and wheels with Norton roadster 'Roadholder' front forks

Whereas most were one-off builds, an early attempt at production was announced by Staffordshire engineer Tom Somerton in late 1959, with an intended low-volume run from 1960. It's not known how many were completed.

New Norvins were announced by Hailwood Motorcycle Restorations in 2008, a brand associated with David Hailwood (Mike Hailwood's son) and bike restorer John Mossey. The business soon was dissolved.

The Norvin is now available from John Mossey under a new brand, JMC Classics, together with the Egli-framed Vincent.

=== Fritz Egli ===
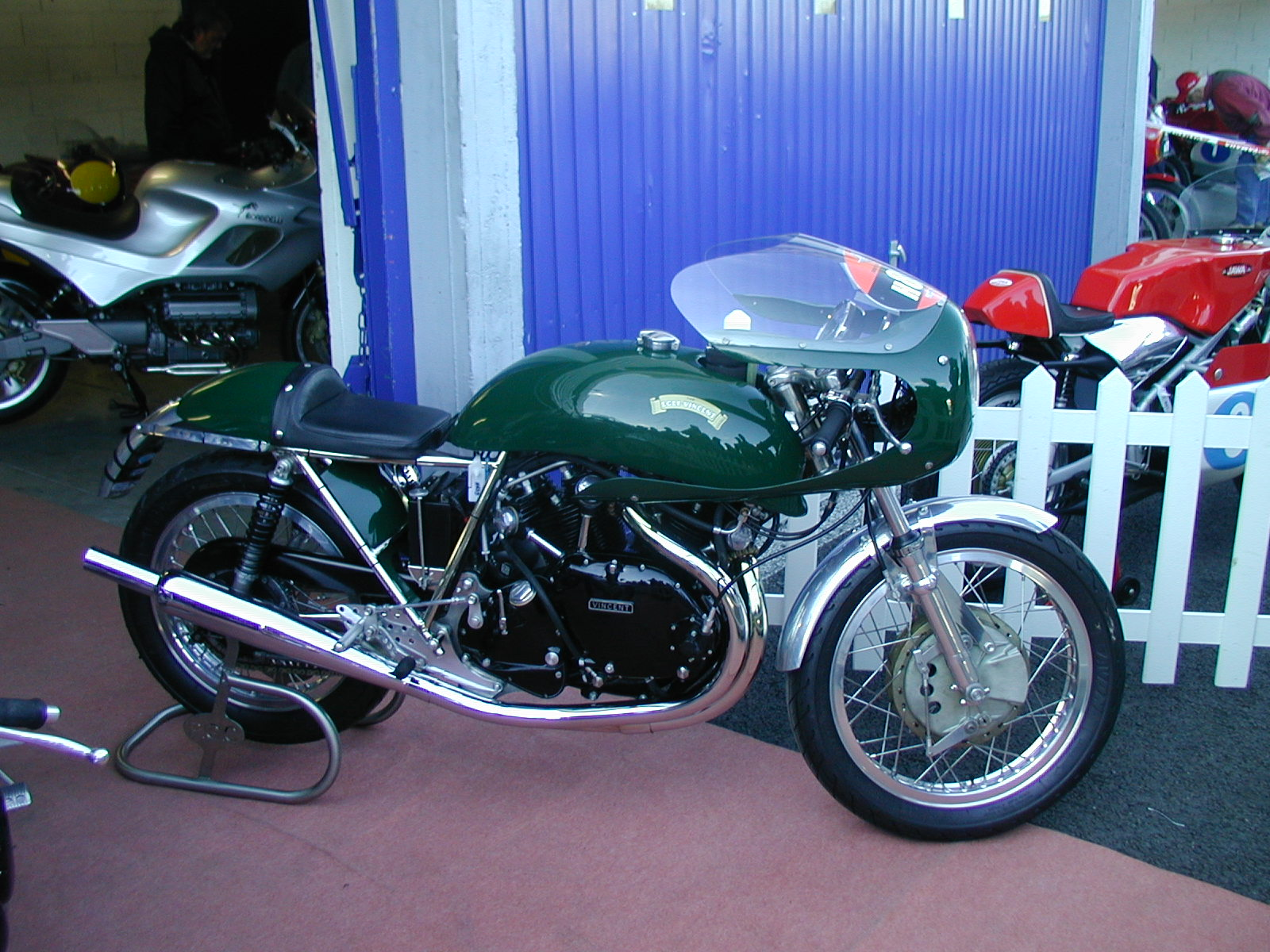
Egli Vincent

Fritz Egli, a specialist frame manufacturer based in Switzerland, produced an Egli-Vincent, and around 100 were produced between 1967 and 1972. Egli-Vincents were subsequently built under licence in France by Patrick Godet and Slater Brothers in the UK. JMC Classics also produce new Egli framed Vincents in UK.

=== Vincent RTV Motorcycles ===
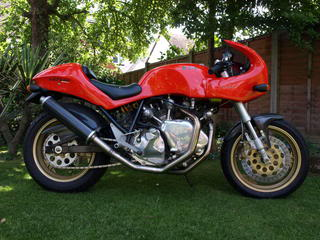
Vincent RTV1200

In 1996, a new motorcycle company was formed by three individuals, Rodney Brown (a metallurgical engineer), Terry Prince (a Vincent enthusiast and specialist) and Ron Slender. Brown provided the financial start and along with Prince were the founding directors, with Slender specialising with business development post-production. The company was named RTV Motorcycles. Its ambition was to produce a modern-day classic Vincent motorcycle that could be marketed, in reasonable volumes, worldwide. It used a redesigned and modernised version of the Vincent engine, engineered by Prince, with an increased capacity and in an Egli-style frame. The motorcycles were to be built individually by hand.

The range was to include both a touring and sports model in capacities of 1,000 cc (RTV1000) and 1,200 cc (RTV1200). Complete new engines would also be made available for separate purchase. Production was initially to begin for the larger capacity machine designated the RTV1200. These were to be fitted, as standard, with state of the art Bosch electric start, Brembo brakes, adjustable Paioli upside down forks, Ohlins rear monoshock and V-2 multiplate clutch. The first factory prototype RTV was built in 1998; other RTV prototypes were in various stages before the company went into voluntary liquidation towards the end of that year.

=== Vincent Motors ===
Vincent Motors USA founder and president, Bernard Li, acquired the Vincent trademark in 1994 and formally launched Vincent Motors USA in 1998, spending about $2 million building prototypes that resemble the original Vincent but utilised modern components like the Honda RC51 V-twin engine. Vincent Motors was based in San Diego.

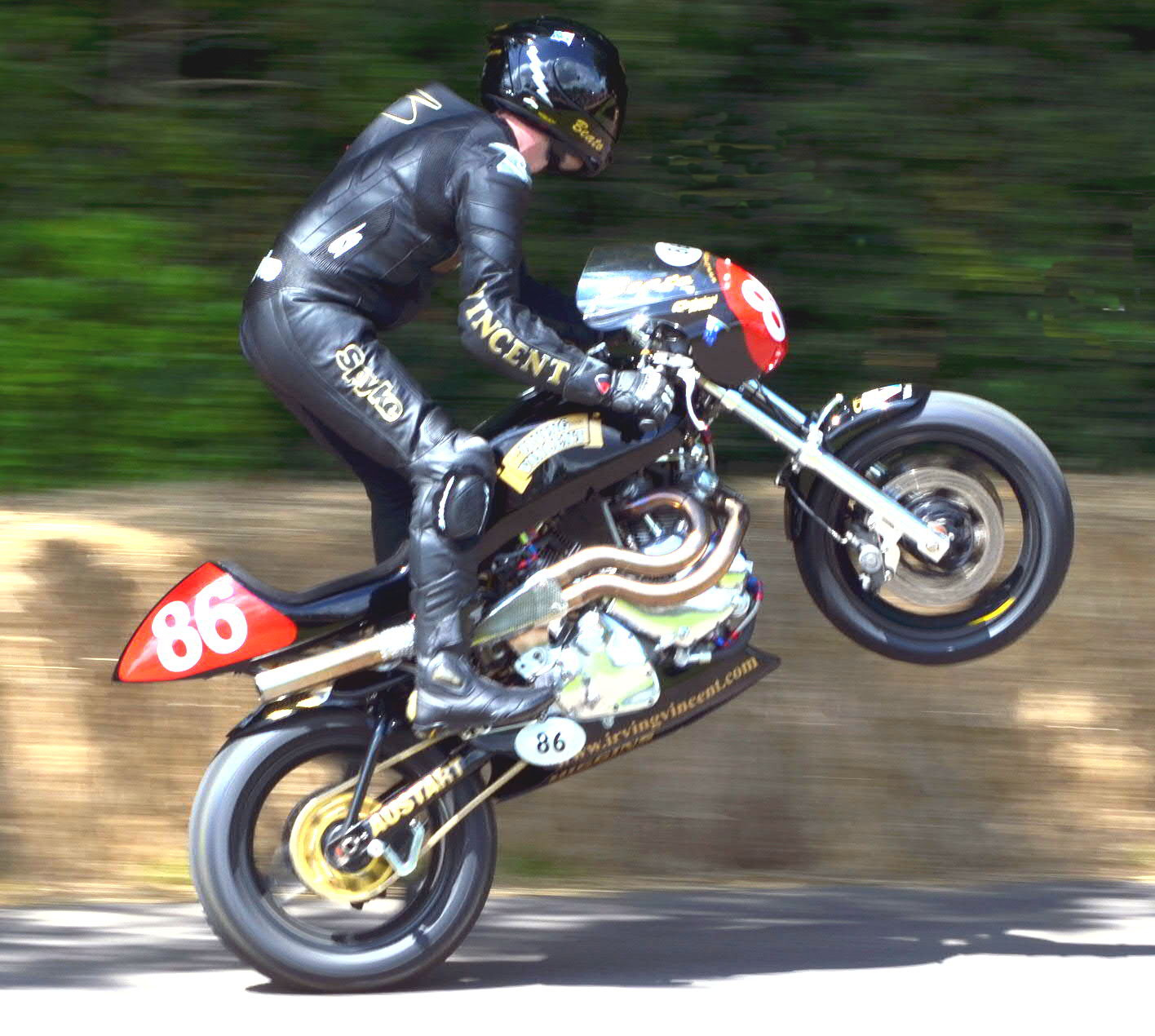
Beau 'Beato' Beaton on the Irving Vincent at Goodwood Festival of Speed in 2012

A resurrection of the Vincent name is now unlikely as the RC51 engine is out of production, and Li was killed in a single-bike crash in Arizona in 2008.

=== Irving Vincent ===
The Irving Vincent is produced in small numbers by HRD Engineering (Horner Race Development – Ken and Barry Horner) in Hallam, Victoria, Australia. Announced in 2003, it is a re-engineered version based on the original Phil Irving drawings, with engine capacities of 1000 cc, 1300 cc or 1600 cc.

Apart from the basic elements of the design, the Irving-Vincent was fully updated, with modern metallurgy, casting and milling allowing far stronger engine construction. The first Irving-Vincent was 1299cc in capacity, had a 14:1 compression ratio, ran on ethanol and developed around 135 hp. Subsequent models increased the engine capacity to 1,571cc, developing 165 hp, followed by a four-valve, fuel injected engine of 1,600cc developing 180 hp and a top speed of nearly 170 mph (274 km/h).

The marque gained worldwide recognition by winning the Daytona (Florida, US) 'Battle of the Twins' in its first attempt in 2008, ridden by Craig McMartin. Plans were made to return to Daytona for the 'Battle of the Twins' with the 1,600cc engined model, but this didn't happen.

== See also ==
- List of Vincent motorcycles
