= Kauaeranga Valley =

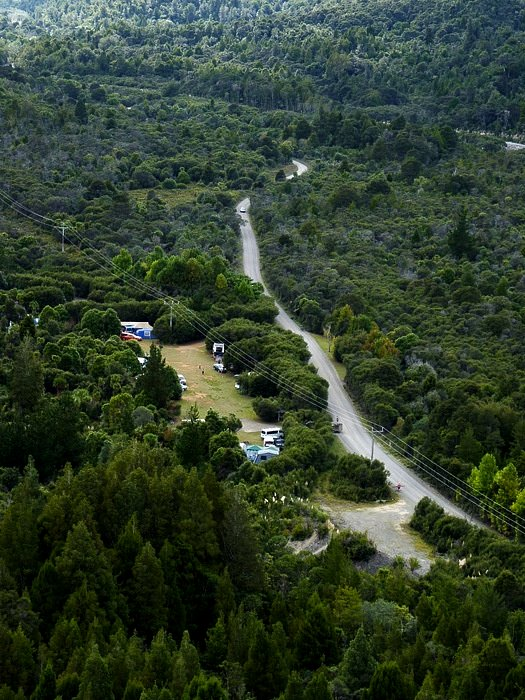
- View from a campsite of the Kauaeranga Valley
- Interactive map of Kauaeranga Valley
- Coordinates: 37.122°S 175.630°E
- Country: New Zealand
- Region: Waikato
- District: Thames-Coromandel District
- Ward: Thames ward
- Community Board: Thames Community
- Electorates: Coromandel; Hauraki-Waikato (Māori)

Government
  - Council: Thames-Coromandel District Council
  - Regional council: Waikato Regional Council
  - Mayor of Thames-Coromandel: Peter Revell
  - Coromandel MP: Scott Simpson
  - Hauraki-Waikato MP: Hana-Rawhiti Maipi-Clarke

Area
  - Total: 179.01 km^{2} (69.12 sq mi)

Population (June 2025)
  - Total: 620
  - Density: 3.5/km^{2} (9.0/sq mi)

Kauaeranga Valley is a valley created by the Kauaeranga River, which flows from the Coromandel Range southwest to the Firth of Thames at Thames, New Zealand in the North Island. It contains the settlement of Kauaeranga (37.1453°S 175.5902°E) on the Coromandel Peninsula. It is located near Thames, in the Thames-Coromandel District in the Waikato region. It covers a land area of 179.01 km^{2}.

Kauaeranga Valley Road is the only significant road in the valley.

== History ==
The local iwi, Ngāti Maru, called the area Waiwhakauaeranga ("waters of the stacked jaw bones") in memory of a battle after which they piled the jaw bones of their enemies on the side of the river.

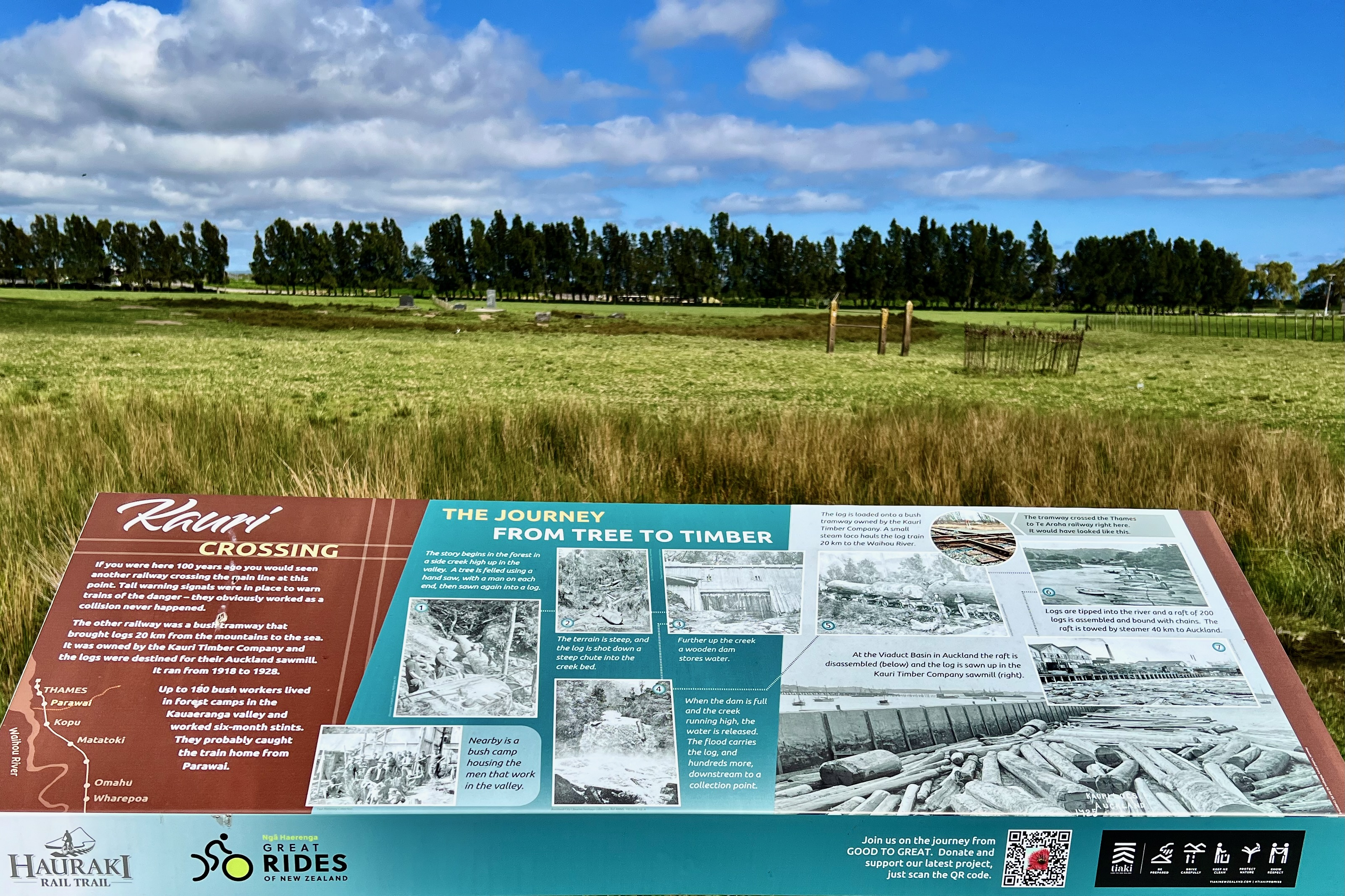
Kauraeranga Valley information board near Totara on Hauraki Rail Trail

The valley was a rich source of kauri timber, and numerous dams and several tramlines were built to facilitate harvesting in the late 19th and early 20th centuries. The last big removal of timber from the Kauraeranga Valley started with the Kauri Timber Company building a 14 mi (23 km) tramway up the valley from the Parawai booms in 1915. Later they extended the line to a dump at the Waihou river below Kopu. All bush operations were finished by January 1928, and the line was lifted. Over 40 million feet of timber was carried over this line. Parts of driving dams, Webb Creek staircase, a log hauling skid road, the Parawai Boom and the Billy Goat incline remain.

In some parts of the valley, farms were established with five lots made available in 1880. Lack of roads and severe weather made farming difficult, so land was allowed to revert to bush. There was little farmed land left by the late 1960s.

Residents first requested that the Auckland Education Board establish a school in the valley in 1896, but the Kauaeranga Valley School did not open until 1903. The initial roll was 30 students. By 1946, with the road to Thames having improved and many children going to school there, the roll had fallen to seven, and the school closed.

A post and telegraph office opened in 1903 The Post Office closed in 1953, with rural delivery taking its place. A telephone office operated from the closure of the post office until 1955, when an automatic exchange would have rendered it unnecessary.

The Kauaeranga Valley Dairy Company opened a factory in November 1907 to produce milk and butter. It closed in September 1908 and moved to Parawai, where it was defunct by 1910.

A road between Thames and Tairua was proposed in 1909, with the recommended route going through the Kauaeranga Valley, up the Piraunui Valley, across the Hihi saddle, and down the third branch of Tairua River. In 1926, a track was created over this route, and the following year, 100 men started work to convert it to a road, but the work was abandoned later that year. After the Second World War, a route further south along the Kirikiri Stream gained favour, and the road which is now State Highway 25A was built from 1961, opening to traffic in March 1967.

From 1957, an electric power line was built from Thames, through the Kauaeranga Valley and north to Coroglen. This was complete by 1959.

Coromandel Forest Park was established in 1970 to provide protection for the remaining native forest, and took over the remaining farmland.

== Demographics ==
Kauaeranga covers 179.01 km^{2} (69.12 sq mi) and had an estimated population of 620 as of June 2025, with a population density of 3.5 people per km^{2}.

Historical population
| Year | Pop. | ±% p.a. |
|---|---|---|
| 2006 | 531 | — |
| 2013 | 528 | −0.08% |
| 2018 | 540 | +0.45% |
| 2023 | 615 | +2.64% |
The 2006 population is for a larger area of 180.50 km^{2}. Source:

Kauaeranga had a population of 615 in the 2023 New Zealand census, an increase of 75 people (13.9%) since the 2018 census, and an increase of 87 people (16.5%) since the 2013 census. There were 312 males and 300 females in 219 dwellings. 1.5% of people identified as LGBTIQ+. The median age was 49.7 years (compared with 38.1 years nationally). There were 120 people (19.5%) aged under 15 years, 66 (10.7%) aged 15 to 29, 279 (45.4%) aged 30 to 64, and 147 (23.9%) aged 65 or older.

People could identify as more than one ethnicity. The results were 93.2% European (Pākehā); 13.7% Māori; 1.5% Pasifika; 2.0% Asian; 1.0% Middle Eastern, Latin American and African New Zealanders (MELAA); and 4.4% other, which includes people giving their ethnicity as "New Zealander". English was spoken by 98.0%, Māori language by 1.5%, Samoan by 0.5%, and other languages by 9.3%. No language could be spoken by 2.0% (e.g. too young to talk). New Zealand Sign Language was known by 0.5%. The percentage of people born overseas was 19.5, compared with 28.8% nationally.

Religious affiliations were 24.9% Christian, 0.5% Māori religious beliefs, 1.0% Buddhist, 1.0% New Age, 0.5% Jewish, and 0.5% other religions. People who answered that they had no religion were 63.4%, and 8.3% of people did not answer the census question.

Of those at least 15 years old, 114 (23.0%) people had a bachelor's or higher degree, 279 (56.4%) had a post-high school certificate or diploma, and 99 (20.0%) people exclusively held high school qualifications. The median income was $32,300, compared with $41,500 nationally. 48 people (9.7%) earned over $100,000 compared to 12.1% nationally. The employment status of those at least 15 was that 210 (42.4%) people were employed full-time, 108 (21.8%) were part-time, and 6 (1.2%) were unemployed.

== Economy ==
In 2018, 13.2% of the workforce worked in healthcare, 10.4% worked in construction, 9.4% of the workforce worked in primary industries, 9.4% worked in manufacturing, 9.4% worked in education, 4.7% worked in transport and 3.8% worked in hospitality.

== Tourism ==
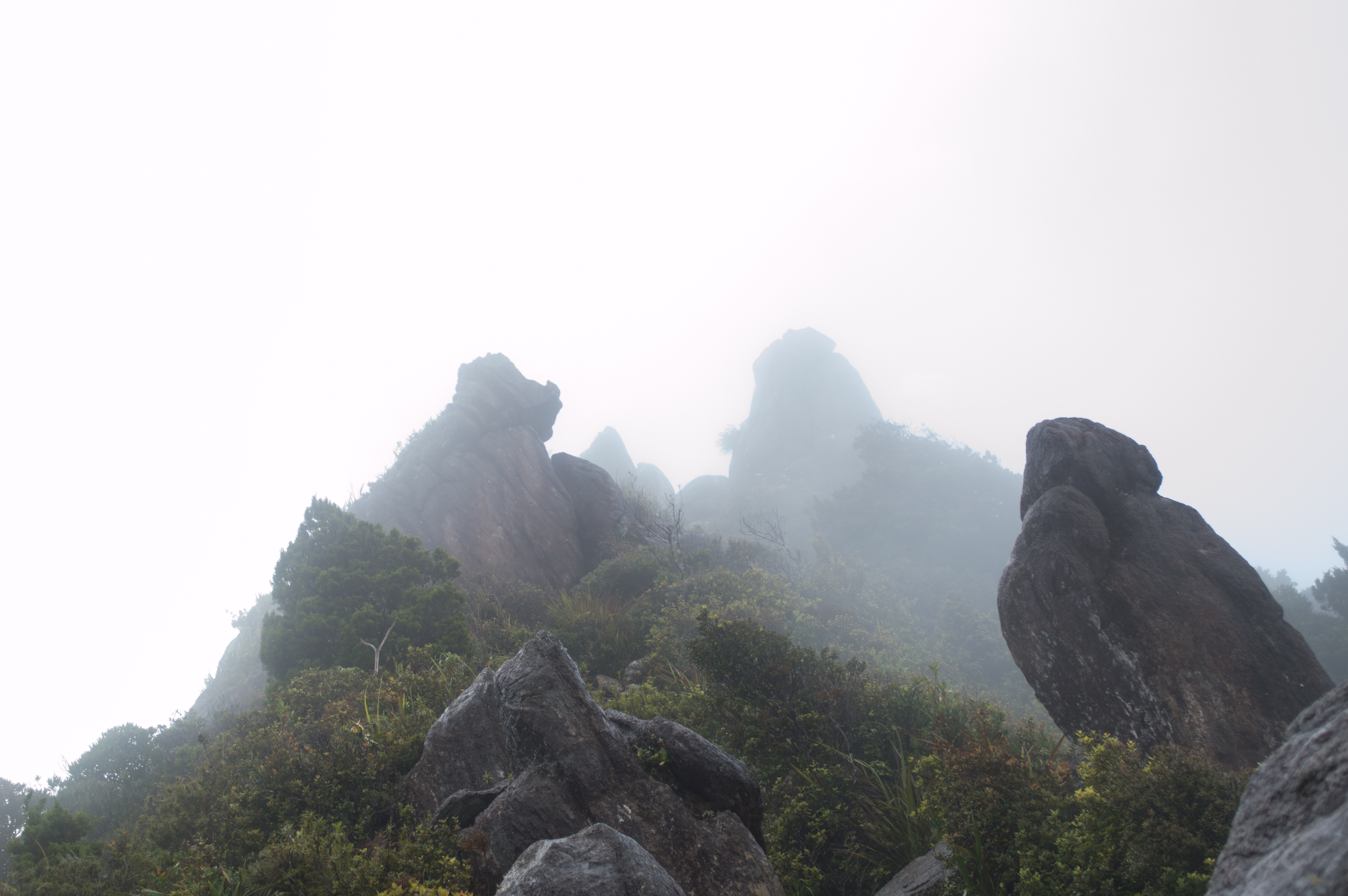
The Pinnacles in Kauaeranga Valley

Kauaeranga Visitor Centre is an information centre run by the Department of Conservation. It accepts payment for camping at the numerous campsites further along the road, and organises accommodation at two cottages next to the centre. The centre is 13 km (8.1 mi) from Thames on Kauaeranga Valley Road. The road is sealed to this point, and gravel for the remaining 9 km (5.6 mi). Short walks, day tramps and multi-day tramps start from the road beyond the centre.

The Pinnacles Walk is a tramp from the end of Kauaeranga Valley Road to the summit of a volcanic plug, 759 metres (2,490 ft) above sea level. The return tramp takes eight hours and is often done over two days.

Pinnacles Hut with 80 bunks and Crosbies Hut with 10 bunks provide basic overnight accommodation for the multi-day tramps.

== Transportation ==
As of 2018, among those who commute to work, 67.9% drove a car, 0.9% rode in a car, 1.9% used a bike, and 1.9% walked or ran.
