= Onemana =

Beach village in New Zealand

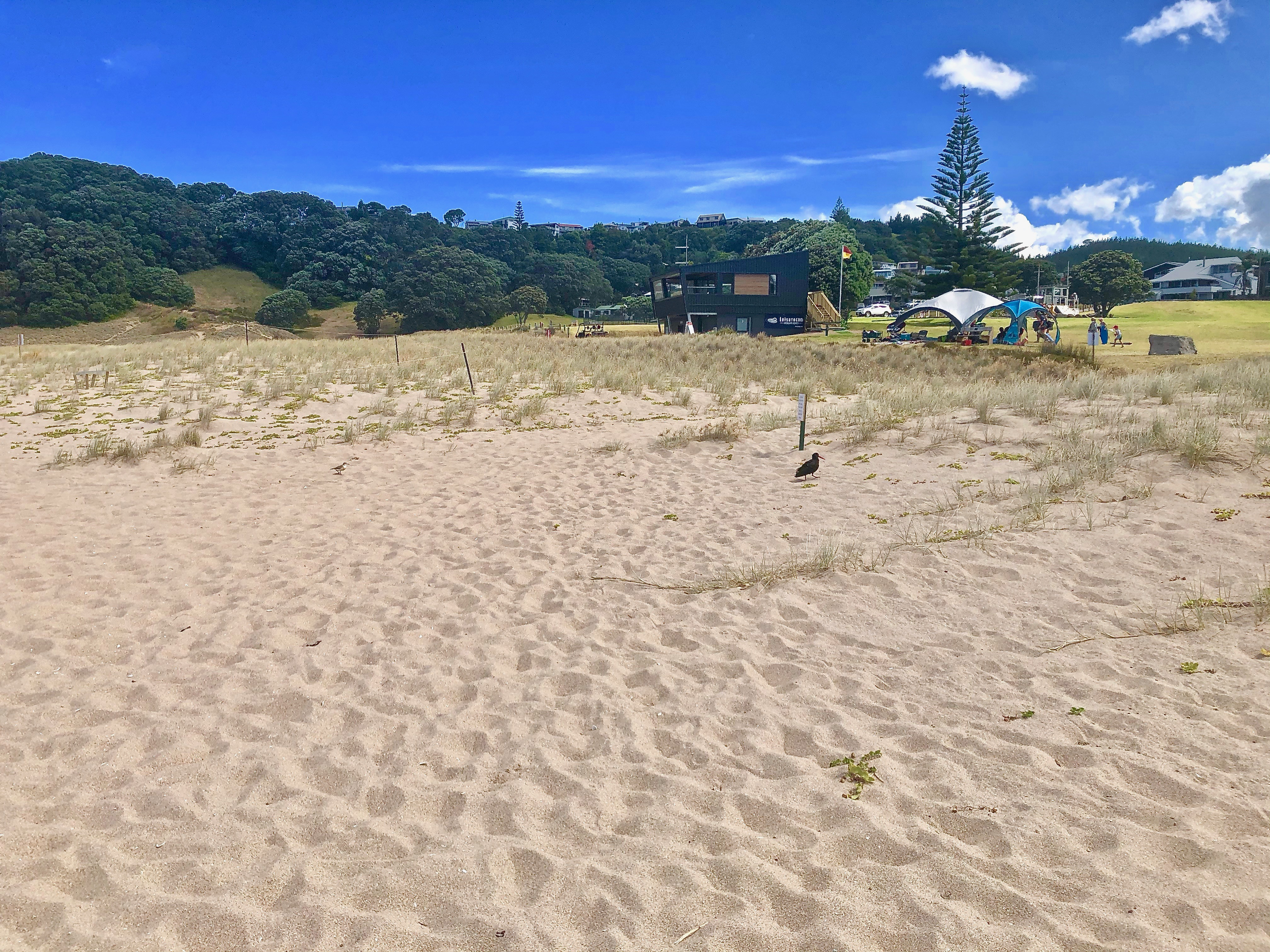
- Onemana village from the beach in 2021
- Interactive map of Onemana
- Coordinates: 37.15177°S 175.87754°E
- Country: New Zealand
- Region: Waikato
- District: Thames-Coromandel District
- Ward: South Eastern ward
- Community Board: Whangamatā Community
- Electorates: Coromandel; Hauraki-Waikato (Māori)

Government
  - Council: Thames-Coromandel District Council
  - Regional council: Waikato Regional Council
  - Mayor of Thames-Coromandel: Peter Revell
  - Coromandel MP: Scott Simpson
  - Hauraki-Waikato MP: Hana-Rawhiti Maipi-Clarke

Area
  - Total: 0.65 km^{2} (0.25 sq mi)

Population (June 2025)
  - Total: 200
  - Density: 310/km^{2} (800/sq mi)

Onemana is a 1970s beach village on the eastern side of the Coromandel Peninsula of New Zealand, with a beach, a surf club, fire station and dairy, along with a spa complex available only to residents. It lies 3 km (1.9 mi) to the east of State Highway 25, south of Pauanui and north of Whangamatā. The Wharekawa River and Opoutere are just to the north and west.

== History ==
The area was originally named Whitipirorua by Māori. The first known settlers of the area were the Ngāti Hei. They were supplanted by Ngāti Hako in the mid 17th century, but Ngā Puhi raids during the Musket Wars of the early 19th century left the area without a permanent population. By a variety of means the land was acquired by the government and sold to settlers. Archaeological evidence suggests that the area was first settled in the 1300s, with a pā located at the south of Onemana Beach. The area was important for the production of stone tools made of matā (chert) and matā tūhua (obsidian).

The 364 section subdivision was created in the 1970s on the Bambury family's Shang-ri-la farm. Much of the archaeological site was destroyed to make way for the subdivision. The name Onemana was adopted for the subdivision, however the name has no traditional relationship with the area.

== Demographics ==
Onemana is described by Statistics New Zealand as a rural settlement. It covers 0.65 km^{2} (0.25 sq mi) and had an estimated population of 200 as of June 2025, with a population density of 308 people per km^{2}. Onemana is part of the larger Whangamatā Rural statistical area.

Historical population
| Year | Pop. | ±% p.a. |
|---|---|---|
| 2006 | 129 | — |
| 2013 | 111 | −2.12% |
| 2018 | 153 | +6.63% |
| 2023 | 192 | +4.65% |

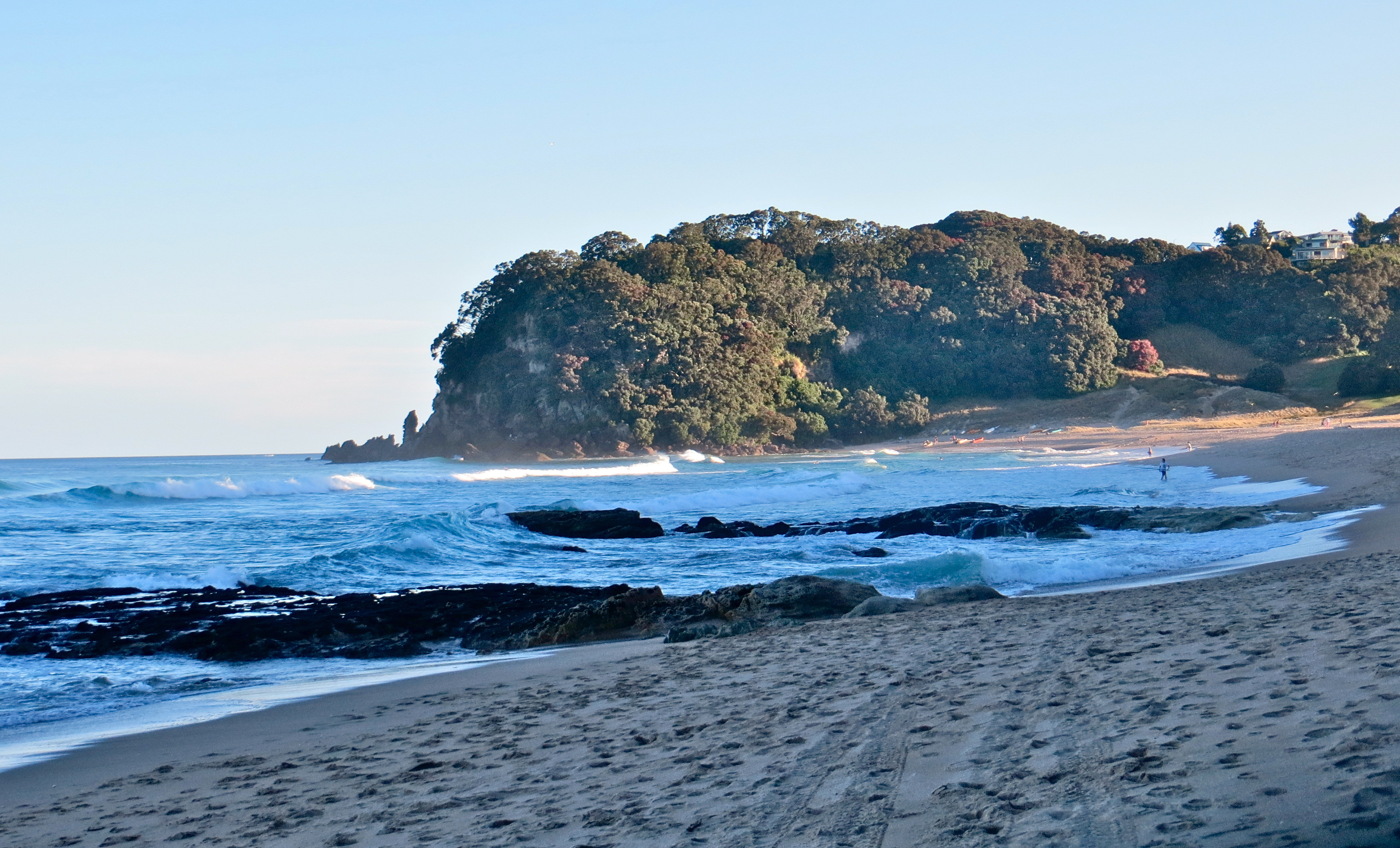
Whitipirorua Point and the south end of Onemana Beach in 2013

Onemana had a population of 192 in the 2023 New Zealand census, an increase of 39 people (25.5%) since the 2018 census, and an increase of 81 people (73.0%) since the 2013 census. There were 96 males and 99 females in 96 dwellings. The median age was 59.3 years (compared with 38.1 years nationally). There were 24 people (12.5%) aged under 15 years, 18 (9.4%) aged 15 to 29, 75 (39.1%) aged 30 to 64, and 75 (39.1%) aged 65 or older.

People could identify as more than one ethnicity. The results were 93.8% European (Pākehā), 17.2% Māori, and 3.1% Asian. English was spoken by 96.9%, Māori language by 3.1%, Samoan by 1.6%, and other languages by 9.4%. No language could be spoken by 3.1% (e.g. too young to talk). New Zealand Sign Language was known by 1.6%. The percentage of people born overseas was 25.0%, compared with 28.8% nationally.

Religious affiliations were 31.2% Christian, 1.6% New Age, and 1.6% other religions. People who answered that they had no religion were 59.4%, and 7.8% of people did not answer the census question.

Of those at least 15 years old, 42 (25.0%) people had a bachelor's or higher degree, 81 (48.2%) had a post-high school certificate or diploma, and 39 (23.2%) people exclusively held high school qualifications. The median income was $33,000, compared with $41,500 nationally. 15 people (8.9%) earned over $100,000 compared to 12.1% nationally. The employment status of those at least 15 was that 57 (33.9%) people were employed full-time, 30 (17.9%) were part-time, and 3 (1.8%) were unemployed.

The population can approach 3,000 during the summer peak.

== Infrastructure ==
A 110 m (360 ft) deep (well) groundwater bore into rhyolite provides water for the village, which used 5,370,000 litres (1,180,000 imp gal; 1,420,000 US gal) in the peak 2 weeks of 2014/2015. The sewage plant handles up to 196 m^{3} (43,000 imp gal) a day, which is disposed of to landfill. Heavy overnight rain from Cyclone Wilma in March 2017 damaged 2 houses with slips and caused wastewater overflows. Onemana sewage plant resource consent renewal was scheduled for 2019/2020. Two accessible toilets, a shelter and community notice board were funded by the Tourism Infrastructure Fund in 2019.

== Surfing ==
Onemana has several surfing peaks along the beach with both right and left handed breaks. The seabed is a mix of sand and rocky reef; and a stream discharges centrally to the bay. A right hand break is sometimes off the southern point through to the beach.
