= Hikuai =

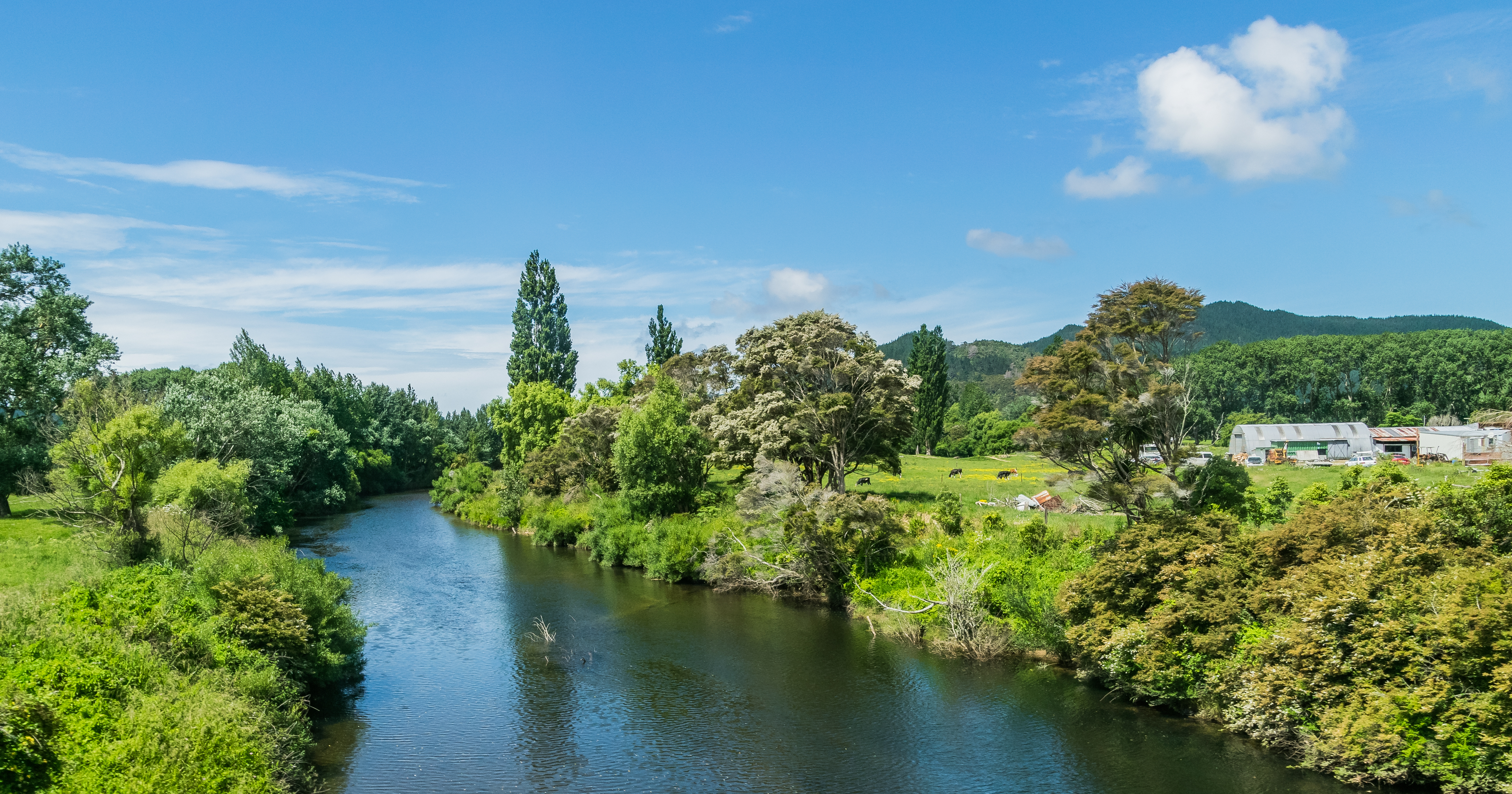
- Tairua River at Hikuai
- Interactive map of Hikuai
- Coordinates: 37.075°S 175.782°E
- Country: New Zealand
- Region: Waikato
- District: Thames-Coromandel District
- Ward: South Eastern ward
- Community Board: Tairua-Pauanui Community
- Electorates: Coromandel; Hauraki-Waikato (Māori)

Government
  - Council: Thames-Coromandel District Council
  - Regional council: Waikato Regional Council
  - Mayor of Thames-Coromandel: Peter Revell
  - Coromandel MP: Scott Simpson
  - Hauraki-Waikato MP: Hana-Rawhiti Maipi-Clarke

Hikuai is a small community on the Tairua River near the base of the Coromandel Peninsula in the North Island of New Zealand. It lies 40 kilometres (25 miles) north of Waihi and 10 kilometres (6.2 miles) southwest of Tairua, close to the junction of State Highways 25 and 25A, the latter of which is a winding road cutting across the steep Coromandel Range of hills. It is a tourist hot spot at times such as New Zealand Labour Day weekend, the Christmas and New Year holiday, and especially when Tairua and Pauanui are busy.

It is prone to heavy precipitation and floods (accelerated by the nearby Tairua River) which occasionally causes impassibility. The cellphone and electricity coverage is patchy but is intact. It has a large colonial and gold mining history making it prone to exploration. Various adventure operators exist and they provide a glance at history and lifestyle.

== Demographics ==
Hikuai statistical area covers an area of the east coast of the Coromandel Peninsula which surrounds but does not include Tairua and Pauanui. It has an area of 284.15 km^{2} (109.71 sq mi) and had an estimated population of 290 as of June 2025, with a population density of 1.0 people per km^{2}.

Historical population for the statistical area
Year	Pop.	±% p.a.
2006	231	—
2013	219	−0.76%
2018	237	+1.59%
2023	270	+2.64%

Hikuai statistical area had a population of 270 in the 2023 New Zealand census, an increase of 33 people (13.9%) since the 2018 census, and an increase of 51 people (23.3%) since the 2013 census. There were 135 males and 135 females in 90 dwellings. 4.4% of people identified as LGBTIQ+. The median age was 45.5 years (compared with 38.1 years nationally). There were 51 people (18.9%) aged under 15 years, 27 (10.0%) aged 15 to 29, 141 (52.2%) aged 30 to 64, and 51 (18.9%) aged 65 or older.

People could identify as more than one ethnicity. The results were 94.4% European (Pākehā); 18.9% Māori; 3.3% Pasifika; 1.1% Asian; and 2.2% Middle Eastern, Latin American and African New Zealanders (MELAA). English was spoken by 97.8%, Māori language by 5.6%, and other languages by 7.8%. No language could be spoken by 1.1% (e.g. too young to talk). The percentage of people born overseas was 13.3, compared with 28.8% nationally.

Religious affiliations were 22.2% Christian, 2.2% Māori religious beliefs, and 1.1% other religions. People who answered that they had no religion were 63.3%, and 8.9% of people did not answer the census question.

Of those at least 15 years old, 42 (19.2%) people had a bachelor's or higher degree, 123 (56.2%) had a post-high school certificate or diploma, and 51 (23.3%) people exclusively held high school qualifications. The median income was $37,400, compared with $41,500 nationally. 15 people (6.8%) earned over $100,000 compared to 12.1% nationally. The employment status of those at least 15 was that 105 (47.9%) people were employed full-time, 42 (19.2%) were part-time, and 3 (1.4%) were unemployed.

== Education ==
Hikuai School is a coeducational full primary (years 1–8) school with a roll of 46 students as of July 2026. The school was built on the present site in 1897.
