= Slipper Island =

Island of New Zealand

Whakahau (Māori)
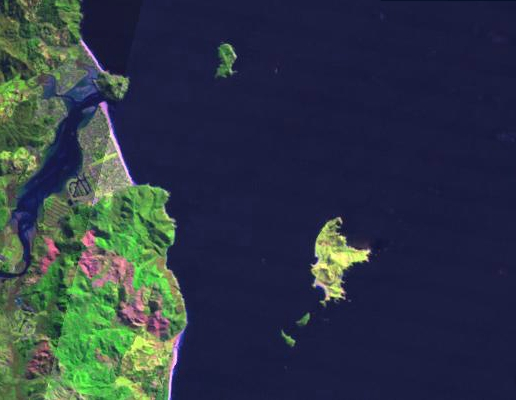
- LANDSAT image of Slipper Island and surroundings
- Interactive map of Slipper Island

Geography
- Location: Waikato region
- Coordinates: 37°03′S 175°56′E
- Area: 2.68 km^{2} (1.03 sq mi)
- Length: 2.8 km (1.74 mi)
- Width: 1.7 km (1.06 mi)
- Highest elevation: 103 m (338 ft)

Administration
- New Zealand

Demographics
- Population: (?)

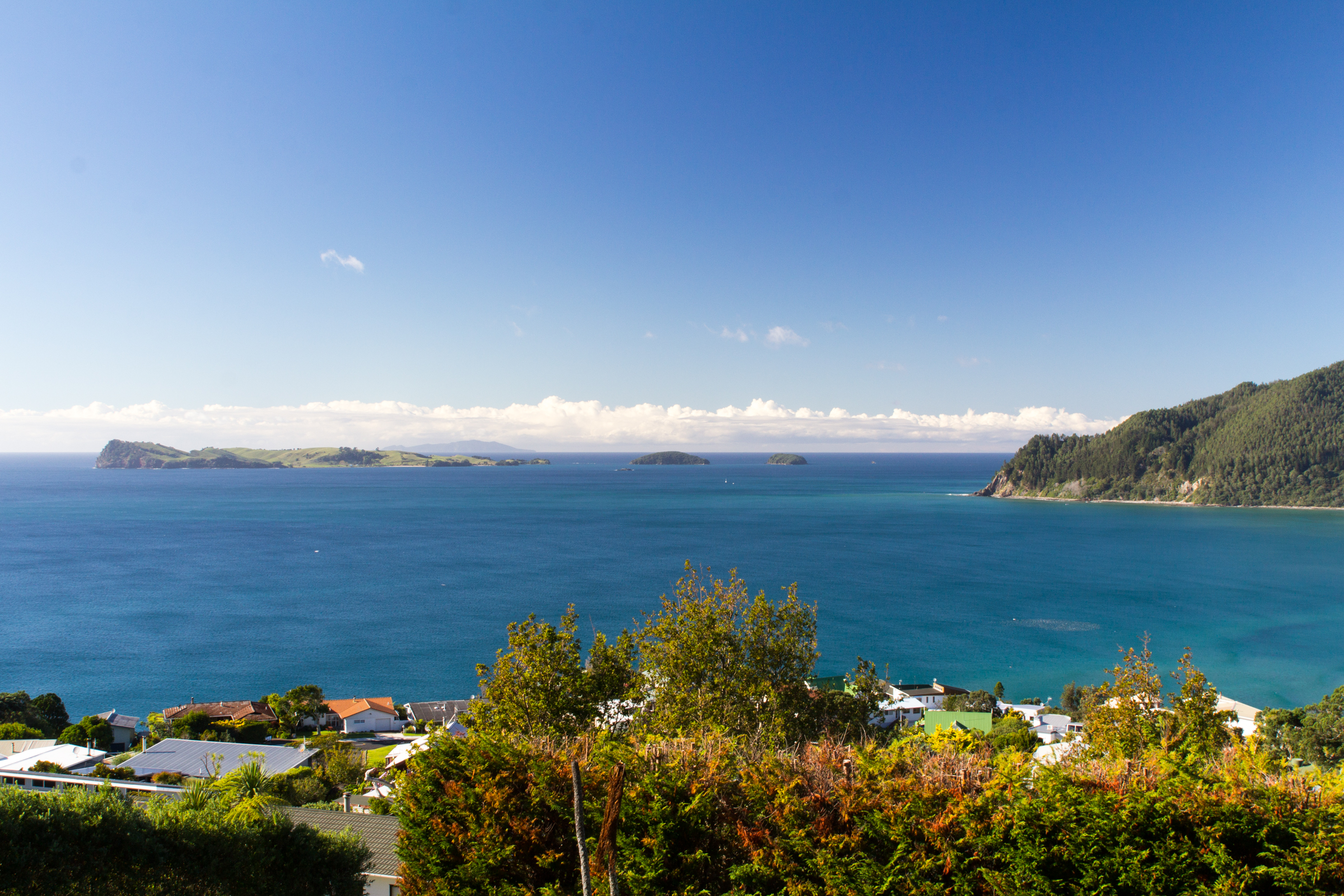
Slipper (left), Penguin and Rabbit Islands from Mount Paku, Tairua

Slipper Island (Māori: Whakahau) is located 3 kilometres (1.9 mi) to the east of the Coromandel Peninsula in New Zealand's North Island and 8 kilometres (5 mi) southeast of the town of Pauanui.

== History ==
Approximately 18,000 years ago during the Last Glacial Maximum when sea levels were over 100 metres lower than present day levels, Slipper Island was connected to the Coromandel by a vast coastal plain. Sea levels began to rise 7,000 years ago, after which the island was separated from the rest of New Zealand. When sea levels were lower, the Tairua River flowed between modern Slipper Island and Shoe Island / Motuhoa, travelling eastwards towards the Pacific Ocean.

There is evidence that the island was the site of early activity of New Zealand's first Māori settlers on their arrival around 1300AD, principally by the discovery of a tropical pearl shell lure in 2001. There are also eight Pā sites and other evidence of occupation such as middens. Numerous moa bone blanks used by early East Polynesian settlers for making fish hooks have also been found. The Island is considered wahi tapu, or sacred to iwi, the Ngāti Maru Runanga and Ngāti Hei. Tuokiokio was the last Māori chief, or rangatira, of Whakahau.

The island was used as a farm from the mid to late 19th century. More recent farm owners included the Normans, later of Opoutere, and the Needhams who purchased the island around 1970. About 217ha (95 per cent) of the island was later set up as a resort by the Needham family, Abe and Nora and their 14 children. This was sold to Auckland-based property developer Wendy Weimei Wu in 2015. The guests and tourists used the then only habitation on the island, the resort of six chalets and the family homestead.

The balance of the island, seven hectares around South Bay, has been subdivided. The television programme Grand Designs New Zealand featured the building of a new house on this land in October 2017.

Several smaller islets (including Penguin Island and Rabbit Island) are found off its southern tip, and the 40-hectare Shoe Island / Motuhoa lies to the northwest.

== See also ==
- List of islands of New Zealand
- New Zealand outlying islands
