= Tairua =

Town in Waikato, New Zealand

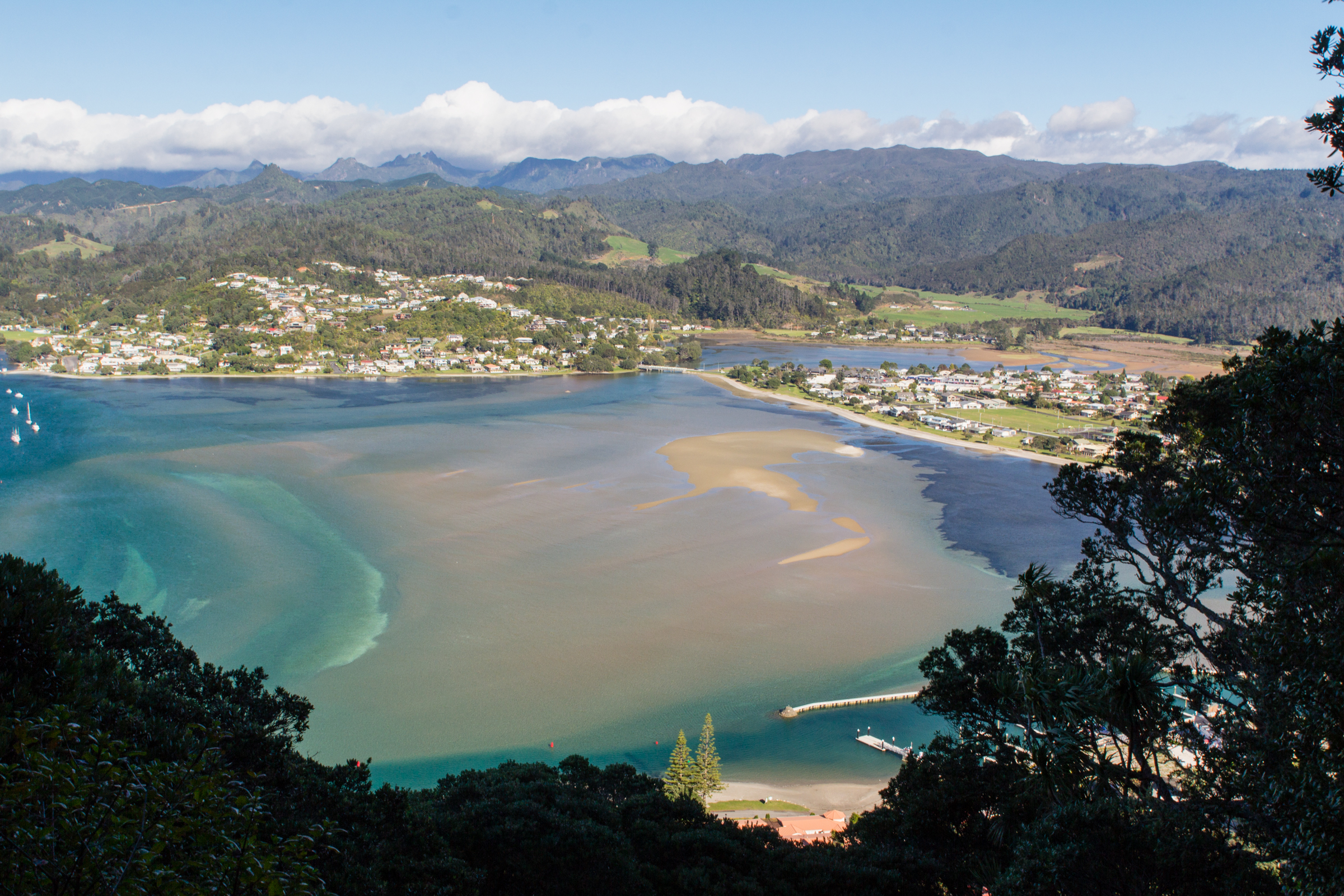
- Tairua from Paku Hill

- Location within New Zealand
- Coordinates: 37°00′23″S 175°50′56″E
- Country: New Zealand
- Region: Waikato
- Territorial authority: Thames-Coromandel District
- Named: around 1800
- Founder: Hongi Hika
- Named for: Tairua translates to Two Tides
- Electorates: Coromandel; Hauraki-Waikato (Māori)

Government
  - Council: Thames-Coromandel District Council
  - Regional council: Waikato Regional Council
  - Mayor of Thames-Coromandel: Peter Revell
  - Coromandel MP: Scott Simpson
  - Hauraki-Waikato MP: Hana-Rawhiti Maipi-Clarke

Area
  - City: 4.17 km^{2} (1.61 sq mi)
  - Urban: 5.45 km^{2} (2.10 sq mi)

Population (June 2025)
  - City: 1,479
  - Urban: 1,640
  - Urban density: 301/km^{2} (779/sq mi)
  - District: 32,200
- Time zone: UTC+12:00
  - Summer (DST): UTC+13:00 (NZDT)
- Postcode(s): 3508
- Area code: 07
- Local iwi: Ngāti Hei

Tairua is a beachside town located on the east coast of the Coromandel Peninsula in the North Island of New Zealand in the Thames-Coromandel District. It is located 150 kilometres (93 miles) east of Auckland and 125 kilometers (78 miles) north of Tauranga. It lies at the mouth of the Tairua River on its north bank and on the small Paku Peninsula. As the 2023 census, the town had a permanent population of 1,630. Tairua is a Māori name which translates literally as tai: tides, rua: two.

Directly opposite Tairua on the south bank of the river's estuary is the smaller settlement of Pauanui. The two settlements are 30 kilometres east of Thames although the town has closer connections with the sea side resort town Whangamatā. Several islands lie off the mouth of the river, notably Slipper Island to the southeast and the Aldermen Islands 20 kilometres to the east. Mount Paku is an extinct volcano that lies by Tairua Harbour. It was thought to have formed the Alderman Islands.

== History and features ==
The earliest occupation of the area was once thought to have been by early Polynesian explorers based on the discovery of a pearl-shell (not native to New Zealand) lure shank found here and originally carbon-dated to the 11th century. Subsequent reassessment of the archaeological site has resulted in dates in the 14th century.

In 1769, Lieutenant James Cook sailed past the coast of Tairua, and named many of the off shore islands after members of his crew and the shapes of the islands. European settlement first took place in the 1830s.

Early European settlers to the area, in the late 19th century, were primarily drawn by timber stocks (predominantly kauri) and gold prospecting.

From the late 1960s Tairua has become a holiday destination, with major activities including game fishing, scuba diving, and surfing.

Radio Tairua is an independent radio station on frequency 88.3FM, which has broadcast to the area since May 2007.

The local Oturu Marae is located in Tairua. It is a tribal meeting ground for Ngāti Rautao and includes the Ngatau Wiwi meeting house.

== Demographics ==
Tairua covers 4.17 km^{2} (1.61 sq mi) and had an estimated population of 1,640 as of June 2025, with a population density of 393 people per km^{2}.

Historical population
Year	Pop.	±% p.a.
2006	1,266	—
2013	1,227	−0.45%
2018	1,479	+3.81%
2023	1,653	+2.25%

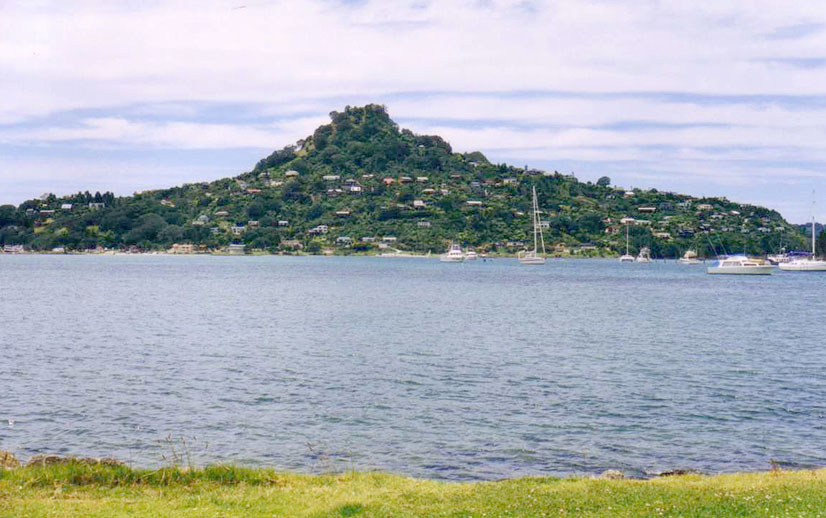
Mount Paku

Tairua had a population of 1,653 in the 2023 New Zealand census, an increase of 174 people (11.8%) since the 2018 census, and an increase of 426 people (34.7%) since the 2013 census. There were 813 males and 840 females in 708 dwellings. 2.2% of people identified as LGBTIQ+. The median age was 59.1 years (compared with 38.1 years nationally). There were 213 people (12.9%) aged under 15 years, 135 (8.2%) aged 15 to 29, 663 (40.1%) aged 30 to 64, and 645 (39.0%) aged 65 or older.

People could identify as more than one ethnicity. The results were 91.8% European (Pākehā); 12.2% Māori; 2.7% Pasifika; 4.5% Asian; 0.4% Middle Eastern, Latin American and African New Zealanders (MELAA); and 2.2% other, which includes people giving their ethnicity as "New Zealander". English was spoken by 98.5%, Māori language by 1.6%, and other languages by 8.3%. No language could be spoken by 1.1% (e.g. too young to talk). New Zealand Sign Language was known by 0.4%. The percentage of people born overseas was 21.6, compared with 28.8% nationally.

Religious affiliations were 29.8% Christian, 0.9% Hindu, 0.4% Māori religious beliefs, 0.7% Buddhist, 0.4% New Age, and 1.8% other religions. People who answered that they had no religion were 56.6%, and 9.6% of people did not answer the census question.

Of those at least 15 years old, 309 (21.5%) people had a bachelor's or higher degree, 780 (54.2%) had a post-high school certificate or diploma, and 354 (24.6%) people exclusively held high school qualifications. The median income was $29,100, compared with $41,500 nationally. 96 people (6.7%) earned over $100,000 compared to 12.1% nationally. The employment status of those at least 15 was that 429 (29.8%) people were employed full-time, 252 (17.5%) were part-time, and 33 (2.3%) were unemployed.

== Climate ==
Tairua features an extremely mild oceanic climate (Köppen: Cfb) with no month having an average temperature above 20 °C or below 10 °C. As a result of this, temperatures above 30 °C or below 0 °C are almost unheard of with the town being a popular holiday location because of its mild weather, beautiful beaches and rugged hills and mountains. These surrounding hills and mountains also cause the city to see significant rainfall throughout the year, especially in winter which can often lead to flooding and slips which isolate the community (almost annually) for a day or two at a time. This high rainfall also leads to lush temperate rainforest vegetation surrounding the city.

Climate data for Tairua, New Zealand (1981–2010)
Month	Jan	Feb	Mar	Apr	May	Jun	Jul	Aug	Sep	Oct	Nov	Dec	Year
Mean daily maximum °C (°F)	24.2 (75.6)	24.3 (75.7)	22.9 (73.2)	20.5 (68.9)	17.6 (63.7)	15.4 (59.7)	14.7 (58.5)	15.3 (59.5)	16.7 (62.1)	18.4 (65.1)	20.5 (68.9)	22.3 (72.1)	19.4 (66.9)
Daily mean °C (°F)	19.4 (66.9)	19.6 (67.3)	18.4 (65.1)	16 (61)	13.1 (55.6)	11.1 (52.0)	10.3 (50.5)	11 (52)	12.5 (54.5)	14.1 (57.4)	16.1 (61.0)	17.8 (64.0)	14.9 (58.9)
Mean daily minimum °C (°F)	14.7 (58.5)	15 (59)	13.9 (57.0)	11.5 (52.7)	8.7 (47.7)	6.9 (44.4)	5.9 (42.6)	6.8 (44.2)	8.3 (46.9)	9.9 (49.8)	11.7 (53.1)	13.3 (55.9)	10.6 (51.0)
Average precipitation mm (inches)	131 (5.2)	122 (4.8)	189 (7.4)	152 (6.0)	164 (6.5)	211 (8.3)	184 (7.2)	199 (7.8)	158 (6.2)	121 (4.8)	125 (4.9)	129 (5.1)	1,885 (74.2)
Source: NIWA

== Tourism ==
The town is a resort popular with domestic tourists, especially people who own a bach in the town. It has several beaches around the town that are popular for surfing and the harbour attracts kayaking and jet skiing. A pathway allows visitors to walk from the centre of town to the top of Mt Paku.

The area is noted for its fishing, with big kahawai, snapper and kingfish being the most prominent fish in the waters surrounding the town. The abundance of rocky islands also make Tairua a popular place for scuba diving and snorkelling. Most diving is done at the Alderman Islands, 20 kilometres from the town and is stated as a marine reserve. Native rainforests are nearby, and areas such as the Coromandel Forest Park and its Broken Hills are within easy reach of the town.

== Education ==
Tairua School is a coeducational full primary (years 1–8) school with a roll of 130 as of July 2026.

Central Kids Tairua Kindergarten provides early childhood education for children aged 2–5 years.
