= Shoe Island =

Shoe Island may refer to:

In Canada:

- Shoe Island (Nunavut) an island in Nunavut

In New Zealand:

- Shoe Island (Waikato) an island in Waikato
- a small island of the Auckland Islands

In the Philippines:

- Shoe Lake (Philippines)

In the United States

- Shoe Island (Lake Michigan), an island in Lake Michigan in the U.S. state of Michigan
