= Whangamata Beach Hop =

The Whangamata Beach Hop is an event held in the town of Whangamatā, on the southeast coast of the Coromandel Peninsula in the North Island of New Zealand.

The first Beach Hop Whangamata Event was held in April 2001 and was established to coincide with the local Rock and Roll Club's birthday hop, which was bringing people to the town.

The 2002 Beach Hop Festival put Whangamatā on the map for its rock and roll clubs, bands, hot rods, classic cars and motorcycles. Entrants were received from overseas. The event was featured in a number of national publications.

Beach Hop 2010 had a police estimate of 60,000 people in attendance.
