= Shoe Island / Motuhoa =

Island of New Zealand

Shoe Island
Motuhoa (Māori)
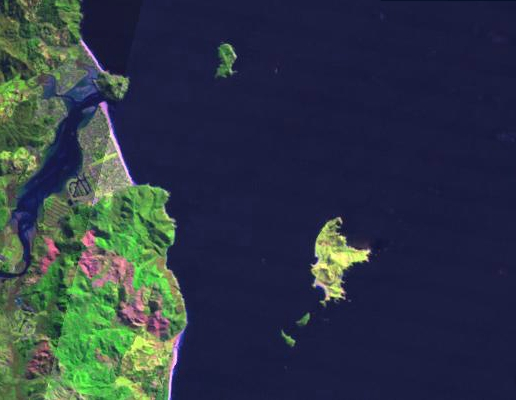
- LANDSAT image showing Shoe Island (centre top), Slipper Island (lower right), and surround area
- Interactive map of Shoe Island

Geography
- Location: Waikato region
- Coordinates: 36°59′30″S 175°54′20″E
- Area: 0.40 km^{2} (0.15 sq mi)
- Length: 1.1 km (0.68 mi)
- Width: 0.6 km (0.37 mi)
- Highest elevation: 124 m (407 ft)

Administration
- New Zealand

Demographics
- Population: uninhabited

Shoe Island / Motuhoa is a small island covering some 40 hectares (99 acres) lying off the east coast of New Zealand's Coromandel Peninsula. It lies immediately to the east of the entrance to Tairua Harbour. The larger Slipper Island lies to the southeast.

The island is steep, with a reef at its northern end. Its highest point is at an altitude of 124 metres (407 ft).

The island is rated as having outstanding natural character. Of volcanic origin, its basic structure is of rhyolite, with its interior covered by windswept indigenous bush and with bare coastal cliffs. Its general isolation and lack of extensive human activities mean that the island has been left in a largely pristine natural condition.

== See also ==
- Desert island
- List of islands
