= Opoutere =

- Coordinates: 37°6′39″S 175°52′23″E
- Country: New Zealand
- Region: Waikato
- District: Thames-Coromandel District

Opoutere is a locality and beach on the eastern side of the Coromandel Peninsula of New Zealand. It lies to the east of State Highway 25, south of Pauanui and north of Whangamatā. The Wharekawa Harbour lies to the south east.

The name "Opoutere" means "place of floating posts".

== History ==
The first known settlers of the area were the Ngāti Hei. They were supplanted by the Ngāti Hako in the mid 17th century, who were replaced through conquest by Ngāti Hikairo. Marutuāhu granted Hikairo possession of lands won in conquest as part of the confederation, and so Hikairo from his Pa at Turuakange (Turua) extended his mana whenua in a straight line Pakirarahi, Wharekawa, Tairua, Pauanui, Opoutere

In the 1870s and 1880s, gold prospectors staked claims on quartz outcrops around the Wharekewa Harbour, resulting in half a dozen major gold strikes, and several mines being established in the 1890s. Kauri logging was underway in the 1890s too, and as it petered out, gum-diggers moved in. At the start of the 20th century, there was a settlement of about 50 people near the mouth of the harbour, with a store, a bakery and a post office. An Anglican church was built but was taken over by Ringatū worshippers. As the forest disappeared and the gum industry declined in the 1920s, the village also declined. By the late 1930s, the shops had closed, and the church had been abandoned. Farming and the planting of pines for the Tairua State Forest gradually healed the land.

After World War II, a few families from Auckland and Hamilton built baches beside the harbour, and in the 1950s a holiday store and a camping ground opened. Three small subdivisions were established in the late 1960s and 1970s, but the local community resisted further development during the 1980s.

== Gallery ==
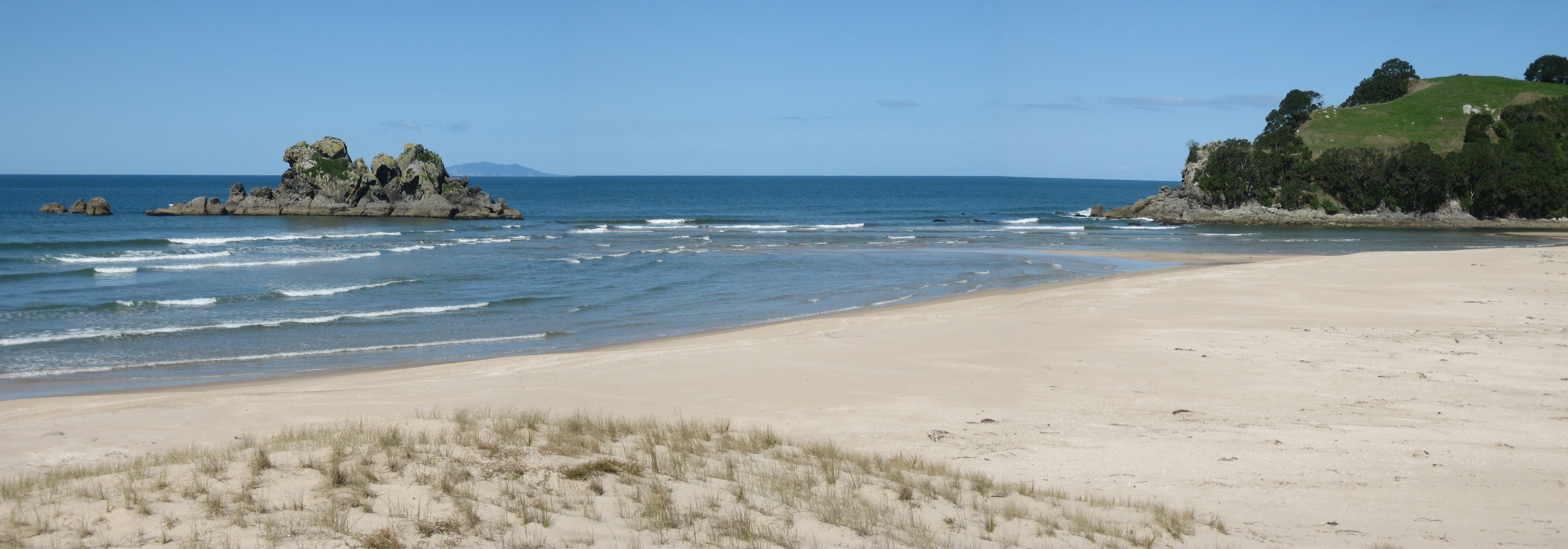
Southern end of Opoutere Beach

== Education ==
Opoutere School is a coeducational full primary school (years 1–8), with a decile rating of 4 and a roll of 103. A native school was first built in 1908, but the original school building later became a youth hostel.
