= Kauaeranga River =

Coordinates: 37°09′S 175°33′E

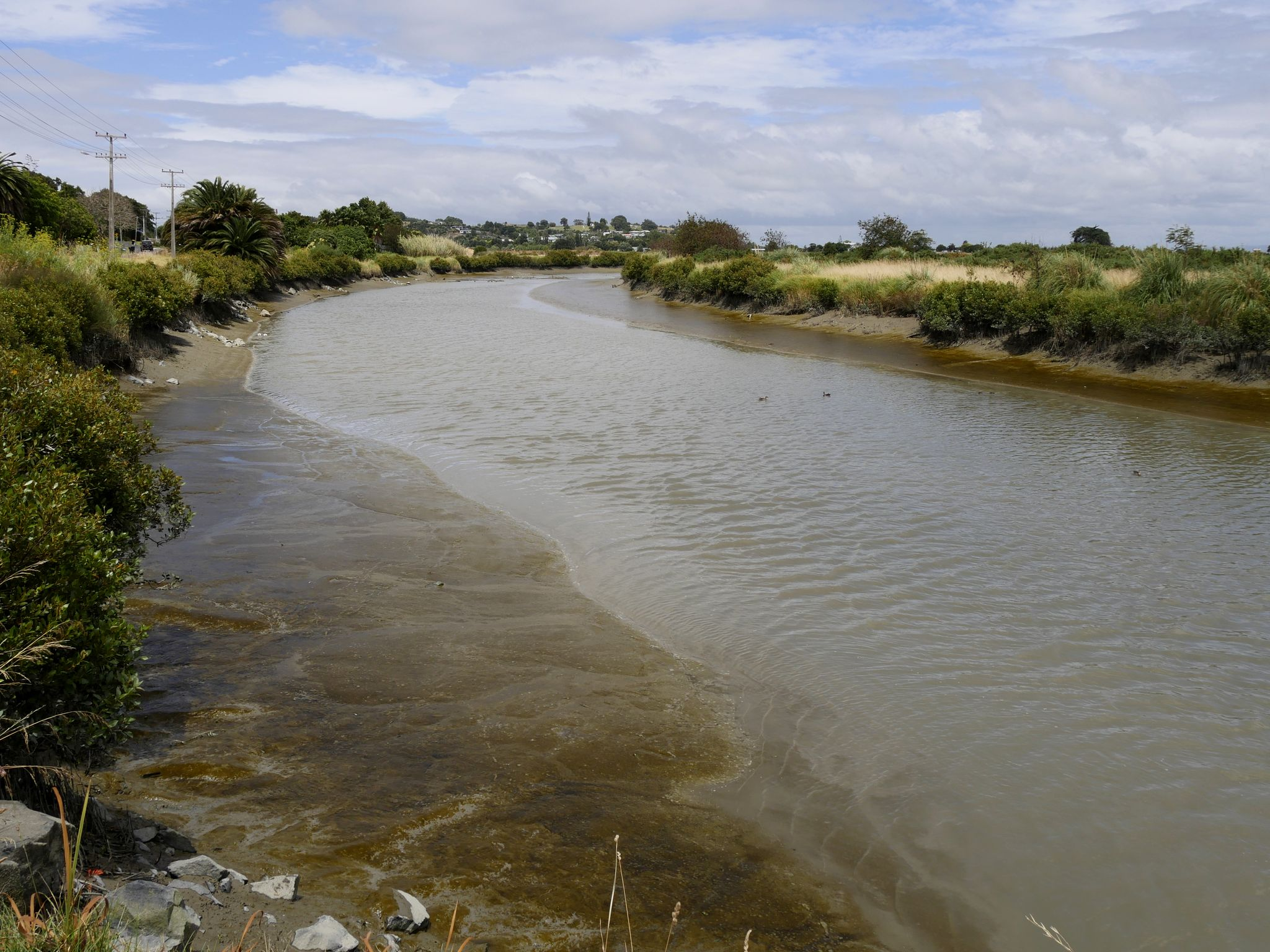

Location
- Country: New Zealand

Physical characteristics
- Source
  - location: The Pinnacles
  - elevation: 773 m (2,536 ft)
- Mouth
  - location: Firth of Thames
  - elevation: 0m
- Length: 31.2 km (19.4 mi)
- Basin size: 139 km^{2} (54 sq mi)

The Kauaeranga River is a river of New Zealand's North Island. One of the main rivers on the Coromandel Peninsula, it rises in the Coromandel Range which forms the backbone of the peninsula, flowing southwest through the Kauaeranga Valley to reach the Firth of Thames at Thames.

Apart from ammoniacal nitrogen, water quality is generally good.

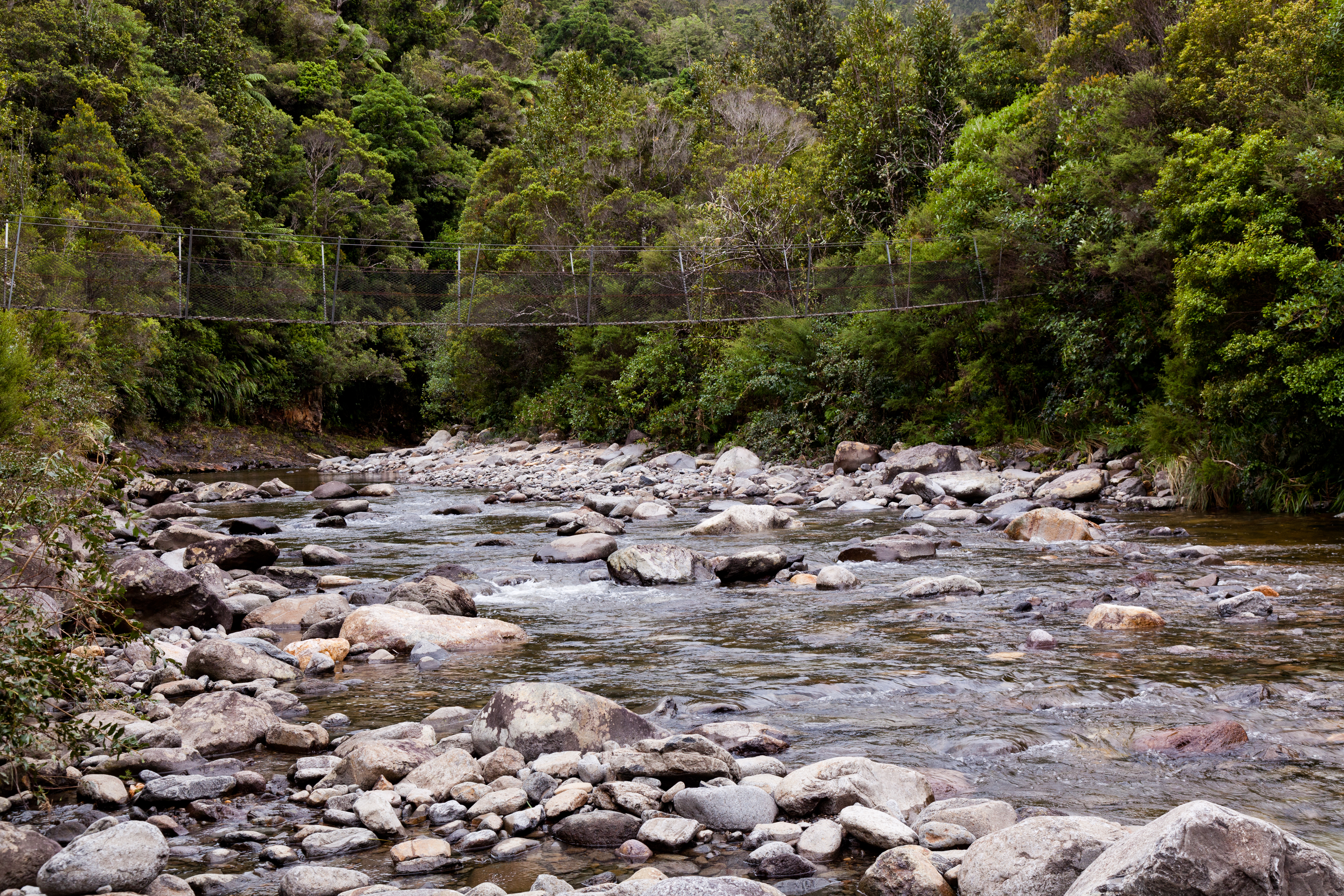
Swing Bridge over Kauaeranga River

== See also ==
- List of rivers of New Zealand

== Sources ==
"Place name detail: Kauaeranga River". New Zealand Gazetteer. Land Information New Zealand.
