= Pauanui =

Town in Coromandel Peninsula, New Zealand

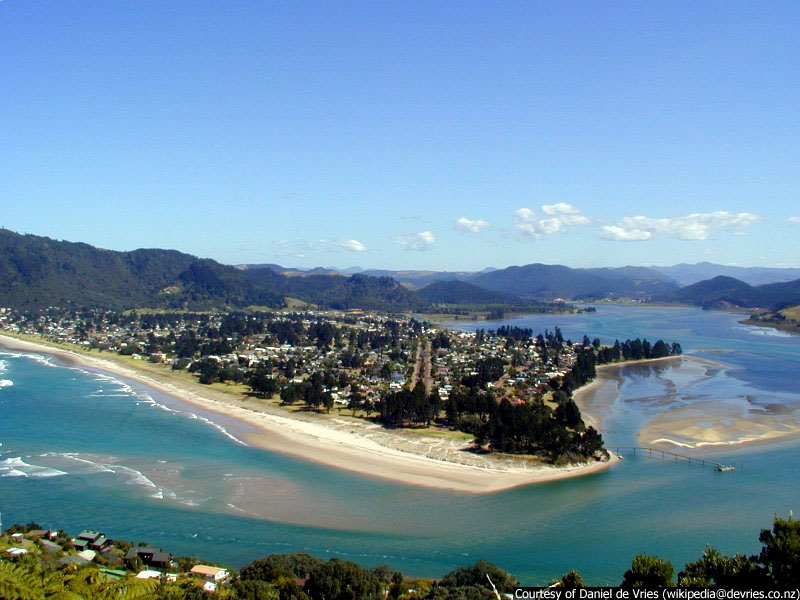
- View of Pauanui from the top of Mount Paku
- Interactive map of Pauanui
- Coordinates: 37°1′5″S 175°51′45″E
- Country: New Zealand
- Region: Waikato
- District: Thames-Coromandel District
- Ward: South Eastern ward
- Community Board: Tairua-Pāuanui Community
- Electorates: Coromandel; Hauraki-Waikato (Māori)

Government
  - Council: Thames-Coromandel District Council
  - Regional council: Waikato Regional Council
  - Mayor of Thames-Coromandel: Peter Revell
  - Coromandel MP: Scott Simpson
  - Hauraki-Waikato MP: Hana-Rawhiti Maipi-Clarke

Area
  - Total: 9.75 km^{2} (3.76 sq mi)

Population (June 2025)
  - Total: 1,070
  - Density: 110/km^{2} (284/sq mi)

The town of Pauanui (Māori: Pāuanui, meaning "big pāua") is on the east coast of the Coromandel Peninsula in the North Island of New Zealand. It lies at the mouth of the Tairua River on its south bank, directly opposite the larger town of Tairua.

The two settlements are 30 kilometres east of Thames. Several islands lie off the mouth of the river, notably Slipper Island to the southeast and the Aldermen Islands 20 kilometres to the East.

The area is a popular holiday destination, with an estimated summer holidaymaker population of over 15,000. Pauanui is known as New Zealand's holiday destination for the elite and wealthy. It is approximately a one-hour 50-minute drive from Auckland, New Zealand's most populous city.

The settlement has an airstrip used by recreational light-aircraft pilots and is noted for game fishing, diving, surfing and its excellent beach.

The area was developed in the late 1960s with a focus on families and included features that were first of their kind in New Zealand, such as red-coloured roads to improve the visibility of pedestrians.

== Demographics ==
Pauanui covers 9.75 km^{2} (3.76 sq mi) and had an estimated population of 1,070 as of June 2025, with a population density of 110 people per km^{2}.

Historical population
Year	Pop.	±% p.a.
2006	801	—
2013	825	+0.42%
2018	1,005	+4.03%
2023	1,068	+1.22%

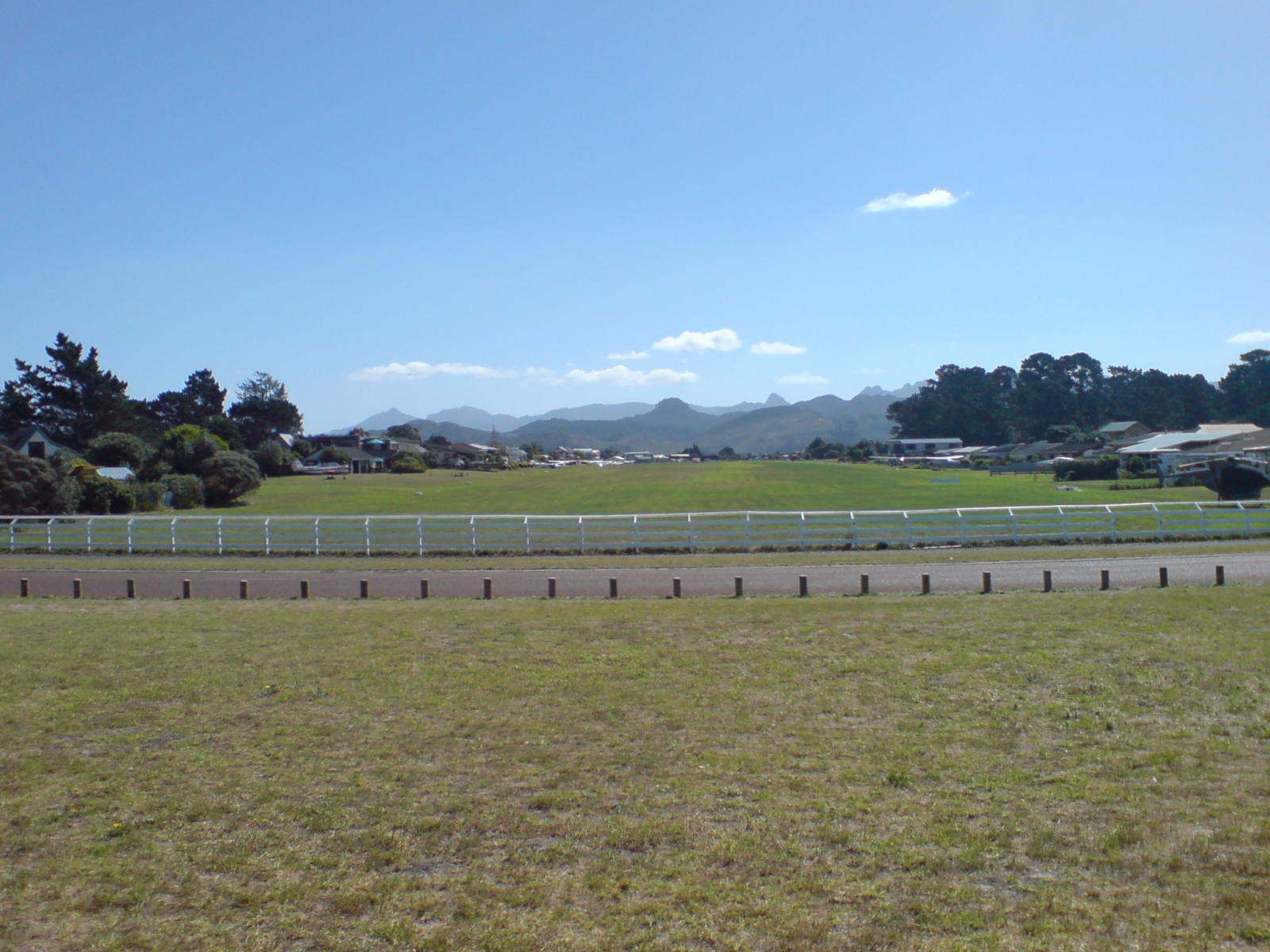
The Pauanui airfield, with aircraft parked almost in the backyards of properties.

Pauanui had a population of 1,068 in the 2023 New Zealand census, an increase of 63 people (6.3%) since the 2018 census, and an increase of 243 people (29.5%) since the 2013 census. There were 519 males, 537 females and 9 people of other genders in 486 dwellings. 1.7% of people identified as LGBTIQ+. The median age was 61.8 years (compared with 38.1 years nationally). There were 96 people (9.0%) aged under 15 years, 102 (9.6%) aged 15 to 29, 390 (36.5%) aged 30 to 64, and 483 (45.2%) aged 65 or older.

People could identify as more than one ethnicity. The results were 94.9% European (Pākehā); 6.7% Māori; 0.3% Pasifika; 3.9% Asian; 0.6% Middle Eastern, Latin American and African New Zealanders (MELAA); and 1.7% other, which includes people giving their ethnicity as "New Zealander". English was spoken by 98.9%, Māori language by 1.7%, and other languages by 5.6%. No language could be spoken by 0.8% (e.g. too young to talk). New Zealand Sign Language was known by 0.3%. The percentage of people born overseas was 20.2, compared with 28.8% nationally.

Religious affiliations were 36.5% Christian, 1.4% Hindu, 0.8% Buddhist, 0.6% New Age, and 0.8% other religions. People who answered that they had no religion were 53.4%, and 6.5% of people did not answer the census question.

Of those at least 15 years old, 162 (16.7%) people had a bachelor's or higher degree, 600 (61.7%) had a post-high school certificate or diploma, and 207 (21.3%) people exclusively held high school qualifications. The median income was $33,300, compared with $41,500 nationally. 96 people (9.9%) earned over $100,000 compared to 12.1% nationally. The employment status of those at least 15 was that 312 (32.1%) people were employed full-time, 135 (13.9%) were part-time, and 3 (0.3%) were unemployed.
