= Coromandel Forest Park =

Protected area of New Zealand

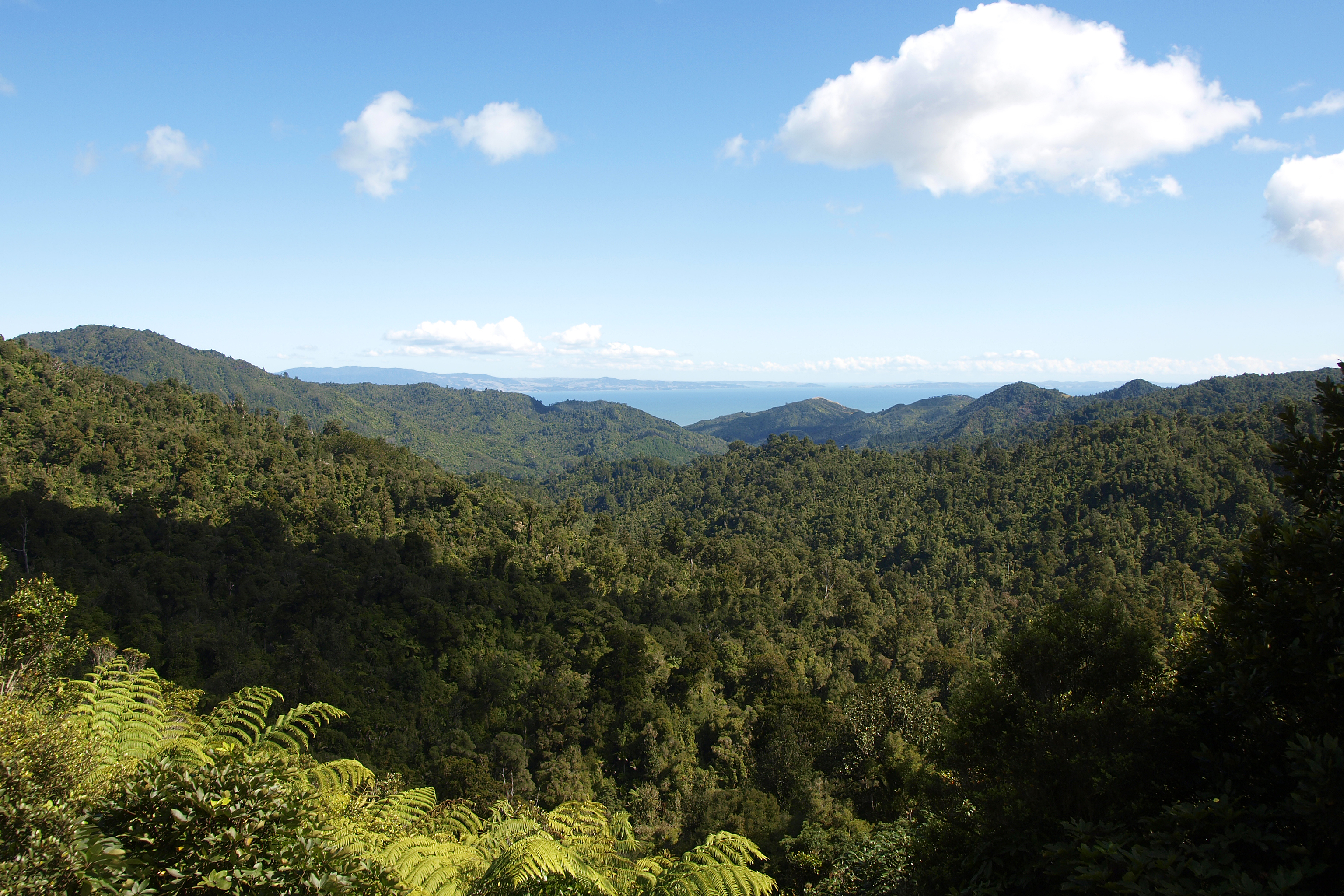
- Coromandel Forest Park, west towards Firth of Thames

- Location within New Zealand
- Location: Waikato Region, New Zealand
- Nearest city: Tauranga
- Coordinates: 37.0254308°S 175.6640365°E
- Area: 71,899 hectares (177,670 acres)
- Established: 1971
- Governing body: Department of Conservation

Coromandel Forest Park is a protected area and conservation park administered by the Department of Conservation, covering 71,899 hectares of the Coromandel Peninsula, in the Thames Coromandel District of the Waikato Region.

It consists of hills and valleys covered in dense native bush. One of the valleys, Kauaeranga Valley, also includes several swimming holes.

The park borders the holiday resort town of Whangamatā.

== History ==
=== Early history ===
The forest park began as the Crosbies Settlement, an isolated group of five lots farmed by European settlers Thomas and Agnes Crosbie. The lots were only accessible by foot, horseback or horse-drawn vehicle. The lots were sold to another family in 1917, who had abandoned by the land by 1926. Other attempts to farm the land were unsuccessful, and bush had reclaimed the cleared land by the 1960s.

In 1970 and 1971, the lots were incorporated into the newly established Coromandel Forest Park. A remaining woolshed was used as a trampers' hut until it blew down in the late 1980s.

=== Modern history ===
The Department of Conservation built new huts in the park in 2010.

A canyoner was airlifted out of the park in October 2019 following a fall.

In January 2021, the Department of Conservation expressed concerns about the scale of illegal dumping of rubbish in the Coromandel Forest Park, including in waterways.

Drone photography taken in June 2021 indicated possums were causing "top down" collapse in the Papakai block of the forest, while pest control was protecting native rātā trees in other parts of the park.

== Mining ==
Wharekirauponga Forest, in the southern part of the park, was initially rejected as a gold-mining site in the 1980s, but further exploration drilling from 2005 onwards suggested it could be viable as a gold-mining site.

OceanaGold purchased mining interest in 2016. It found gold and silver in the area in February 2019, and formally applied for a mining permit in May 2019.

An anti-mining group, Coromandel Watchdog, claims the area should be protected from gold mining because the bush has high ecological value, priority ecosystems, threatened species and the headwater of a major catchment. It claims mining would also destroy an important habitat of the endangered Archey's Frog. Former MP Catherine Delahunty has been involved in protests against mining Coromandel Forest Park.

== See also ==
- Conservation parks of New Zealand
