= Aldermen Islands =

Island group in Mercury Bay, New Zealand

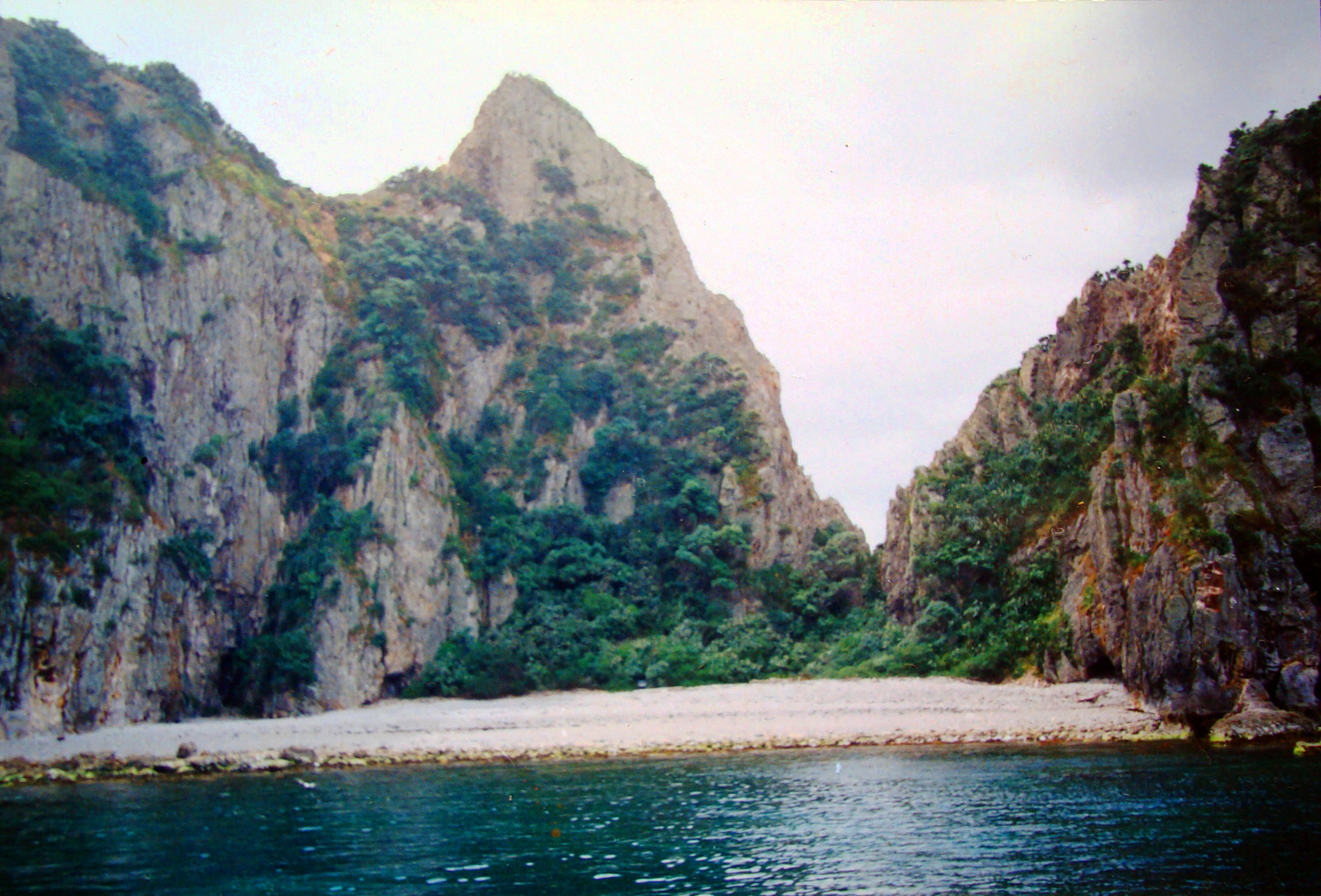
- A bay on one of the Aldermen Islands.
- Interactive map of Aldermen Islands

Geography
- Location: Mercury Bay in the North Island
- Coordinates: 36°58′S 176°05′E
- Area: 1.3 km^{2} (0.50 sq mi)

Administration
- New Zealand

Demographics
- Population: 0

The Aldermen Islands are a small group of rocky islets to the southeast of Mercury Bay in the North Island of New Zealand. They are located off the coast of the Coromandel Peninsula, 20 kilometres (12 mi) east of the mouth of the Tairua River.

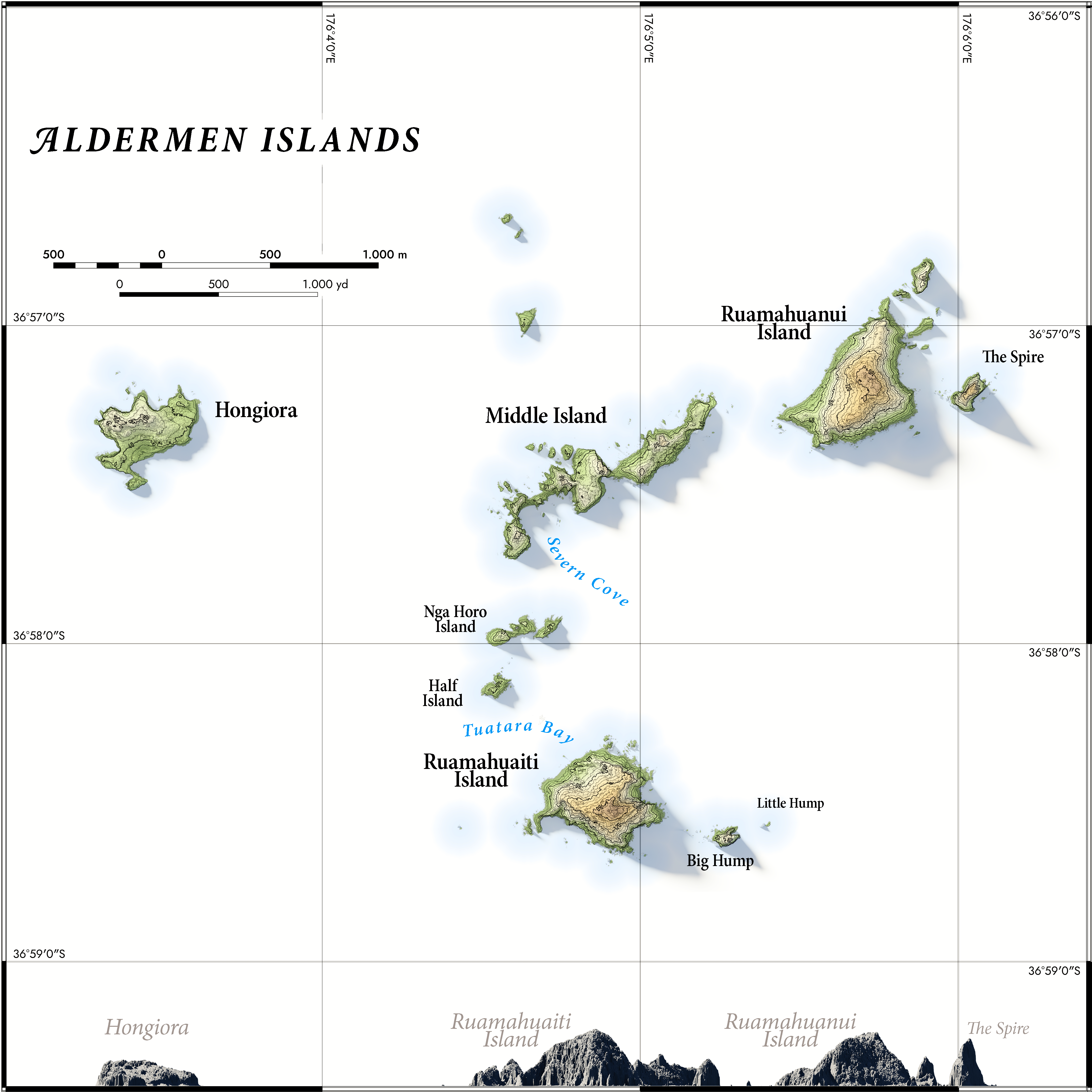
Map of the Andermen Islands

The islands were named 'the Court of Aldermen' by Captain Cook and his crew on 3 November 1769 after previously naming Mayor Island. The Aldermen group consists of four main islands: Hongiora, Middle, Ruamahuanui, and Ruamahuaiti. The smaller islands include Big Hump, Little Hump, Nga Horo Island, Half Island and The Spire. Their combined area is 133.5 ha (330 acres). The islands are a forested nature reserve hosting rare species including the tuatara. Access is by permit only.

The Aldermen Islands are the remains of eroded Pliocene or Early Pleistocene lava domes that form part of the Whitianga Group. Approximately 18,000 years ago during the Last Glacial Maximum when sea levels were over 100 metres lower than present day levels, the islands were hilly features surrounded by a vast coastal plain. Sea levels began to rise 7,000 years ago, after which the islands separated from the rest of New Zealand. When sea levels were lower, the Tairua River flowed south of the features, travelling eastwards towards the Pacific Ocean.

== See also ==
- List of islands of New Zealand
