= Whangamatā =

Town in Waikato, New Zealand

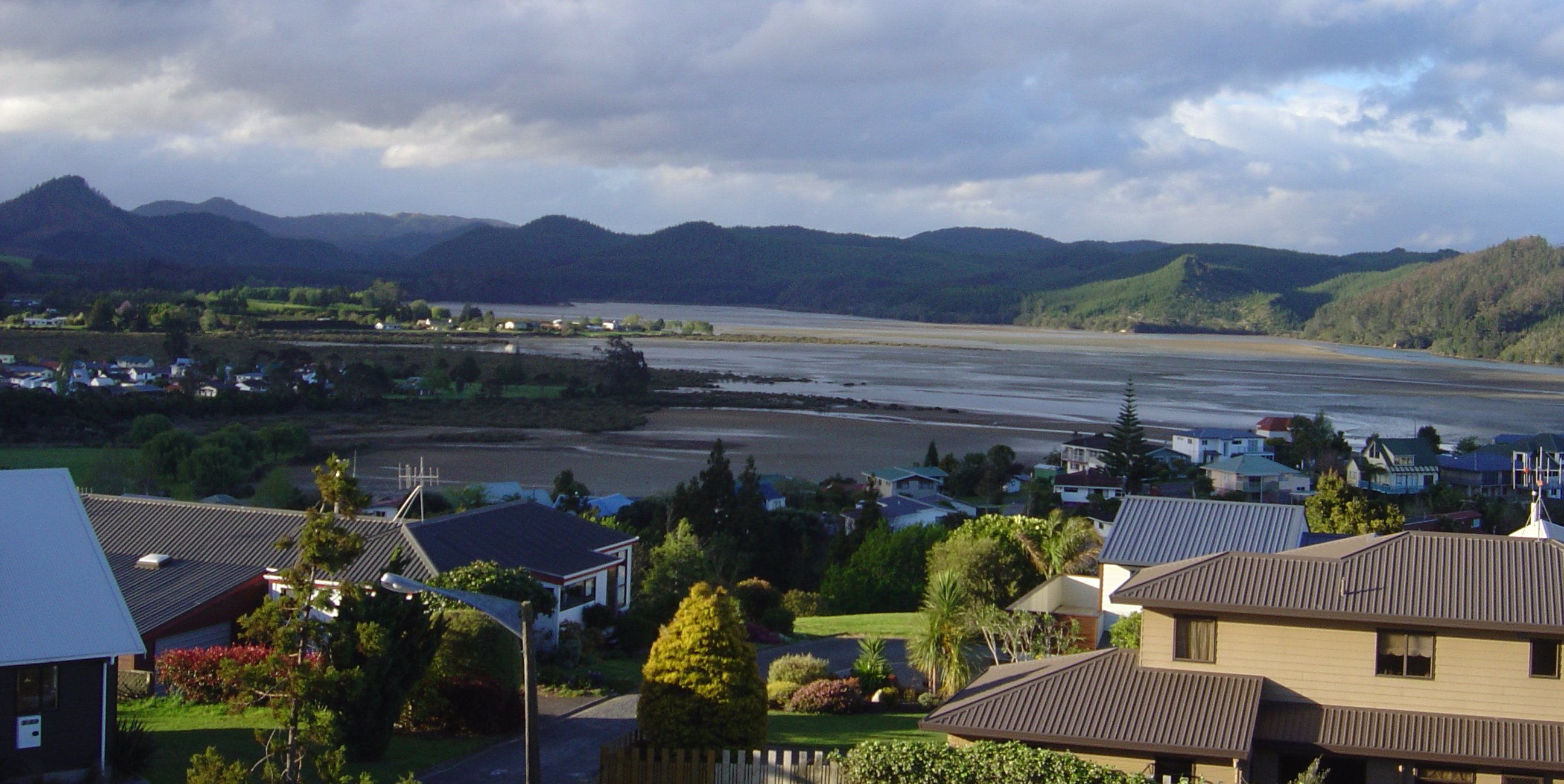
- A view of Whangamatā
- Interactive map of Whangamatā
- Coordinates: 37°12′50″S 175°52′19″E
- Country: New Zealand
- Region: Waikato
- District: Thames-Coromandel District
- Ward: South Eastern ward
- Community Board: Whangamatā Community
- Electorates: Coromandel; Hauraki-Waikato (Māori)

Government
  - Council: Thames-Coromandel District Council
  - Regional council: Waikato Regional Council
  - Mayor of Thames-Coromandel: Peter Revell
  - Coromandel MP: Scott Simpson
  - Hauraki-Waikato MP: Hana-Rawhiti Maipi-Clarke

Area
  - Total: 8.46 km^{2} (3.27 sq mi)

Population (June 2025)
  - Total: 4,230
  - Density: 500/km^{2} (1,290/sq mi)
- Postcode(s): 3620

The town of Whangamatā is on the southeast coast of the Coromandel Peninsula in the North Island of New Zealand. It is located 30 kilometres north of Waihi, to the north of the western extremity of the Bay of Plenty.

In holiday times the population swells considerably: New Year's celebrations fill the town to over 25,000 though this falls soon after New Year's Day.

A number of off-shore islands can be seen from the beach. Hauturu or Clark Island is accessible by wading at low tide and is popular in summer months for rock-pool fossickers and kayakers. Whenuakura, sometimes known as Donut Island, sits about a kilometre east of the southern part of Whangamatā beach (Otahu Beach). Tuatara roamed on Whenuakura until fairly recently. Whenuakura Island has a large collapsed blow hole which has formed a small beach inside the island – hence the alternative name.

The town has two ocean beaches, both of which are extremely safe for swimming and surfing. There is a safe boating harbour at the North end of the town and another estuary at the South end. 15 minutes drive south of Whangamatā is the quietly popular beach Whiritoa. Other beaches just north of Whangamatā are Onemana and Opoutere.

== Place name ==
The Māori name 'Whangamatā' comes from the words 'whanga', which means bay, and 'matā', which means a hard stone, in reference to the obsidian which washes up on the beach. Areas along the coast such as Onemana were locations where matā (chert) and matā tūhua (obsidian) were found and processed into stone tools.

== Demographics ==
Stats NZ describes Whangamatā as a small urban area. It covers 8.46 km^{2} (3.27 sq mi) and had an estimated population of 4,230 as of June 2025, with a population density of 500 people per km^{2}.

Historical population for the urban area
Year	Pop.	±% p.a.
2006	3,561	—
2013	3,516	−0.18%
2018	4,074	+2.99%
2023	4,269	+0.94%

Whangamatā had a population of 4,269 in the 2023 New Zealand census, an increase of 195 people (4.8%) since the 2018 census, and an increase of 753 people (21.4%) since the 2013 census. There were 2,100 males, 2,151 females and 15 people of other genders in 1,926 dwellings. 1.5% of people identified as LGBTIQ+. The median age was 59.6 years (compared with 38.1 years nationally). There were 519 people (12.2%) aged under 15 years, 405 (9.5%) aged 15 to 29, 1,623 (38.0%) aged 30 to 64, and 1,719 (40.3%) aged 65 or older.

People could identify as more than one ethnicity. The results were 91.4% European (Pākehā); 14.8% Māori; 2.2% Pasifika; 2.5% Asian; 0.6% Middle Eastern, Latin American and African New Zealanders (MELAA); and 2.7% other, which includes people giving their ethnicity as "New Zealander". English was spoken by 98.6%, Māori language by 1.8%, Samoan by 0.1%, and other languages by 5.1%. No language could be spoken by 0.9% (e.g. too young to talk). New Zealand Sign Language was known by 0.3%. The percentage of people born overseas was 14.0, compared with 28.8% nationally.

Religious affiliations were 28.2% Christian, 0.6% Hindu, 0.1% Islam, 0.3% Māori religious beliefs, 0.4% Buddhist, 0.4% New Age, 0.1% Jewish, and 0.8% other religions. People who answered that they had no religion were 59.9%, and 9.3% of people did not answer the census question.

Of those at least 15 years old, 624 (16.6%) people had a bachelor's or higher degree, 2,190 (58.4%) had a post-high school certificate or diploma, and 936 (25.0%) people exclusively held high school qualifications. The median income was $30,500, compared with $41,500 nationally. 267 people (7.1%) earned over $100,000 compared to 12.1% nationally. The employment status of those at least 15 was that 1,236 (33.0%) people were employed full-time, 588 (15.7%) were part-time, and 63 (1.7%) were unemployed.

Individual statistical areas
Name	Area (km^{2})	Population	Density (per km^{2})	Dwellings	Median age	Median income
Whangamatā West	2.28	1,053	462	429	58.8 years	$29,800
Whangamatā East	6.18	3,213	520	1,503	59.9 years	$30,700
New Zealand					38.1 years	$41,500

=== Rural area ===
Whangamatā Rural statistical area, which includes Onemana and Opoutere, covers 153.67 km^{2} (59.33 sq mi) and had an estimated population of 530 as of June 2025, with a population density of 3.4 people per km^{2}.

Historical population for Whangamatā Rural
Year	Pop.	±% p.a.
2006	402	—
2013	357	−1.68%
2018	432	+3.89%
2023	522	+3.86%

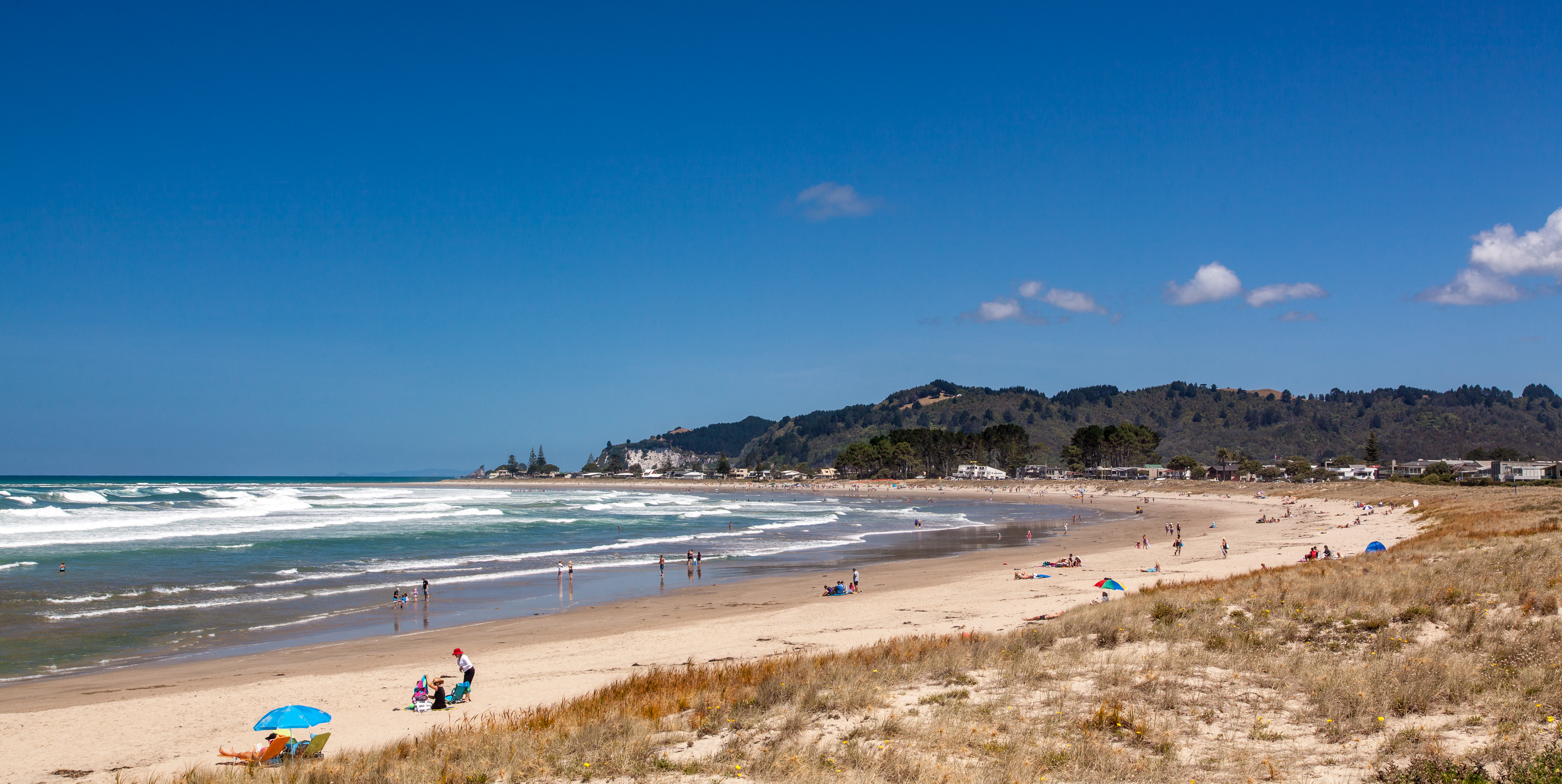
Whangamatā Beach

Whangamatā Rural had a population of 522 in the 2023 New Zealand census, an increase of 90 people (20.8%) since the 2018 census, and an increase of 165 people (46.2%) since the 2013 census. There were 261 males and 258 females in 231 dwellings. 1.1% of people identified as LGBTIQ+. The median age was 53.9 years (compared with 38.1 years nationally). There were 69 people (13.2%) aged under 15 years, 60 (11.5%) aged 15 to 29, 237 (45.4%) aged 30 to 64, and 153 (29.3%) aged 65 or older.

People could identify as more than one ethnicity. The results were 86.2% European (Pākehā); 23.0% Māori; 0.6% Pasifika; 1.7% Asian; 0.6% Middle Eastern, Latin American and African New Zealanders (MELAA); and 2.3% other, which includes people giving their ethnicity as "New Zealander". English was spoken by 97.7%, Māori language by 7.5%, Samoan by 0.6%, and other languages by 7.5%. No language could be spoken by 1.1% (e.g. too young to talk). New Zealand Sign Language was known by 0.6%. The percentage of people born overseas was 19.5, compared with 28.8% nationally.

Religious affiliations were 25.9% Christian, 1.1% Hindu, 0.6% Māori religious beliefs, 0.6% New Age, and 0.6% other religions. People who answered that they had no religion were 64.4%, and 7.5% of people did not answer the census question.

Of those at least 15 years old, 99 (21.9%) people had a bachelor's or higher degree, 252 (55.6%) had a post-high school certificate or diploma, and 102 (22.5%) people exclusively held high school qualifications. The median income was $33,200, compared with $41,500 nationally. 39 people (8.6%) earned over $100,000 compared to 12.1% nationally. The employment status of those at least 15 was that 171 (37.7%) people were employed full-time, 87 (19.2%) were part-time, and 9 (2.0%) were unemployed.

== Education ==
Whangamata Area School is a coeducational composite school (years 1–13) with a roll of 560 students as of July 2026.

== Marina ==
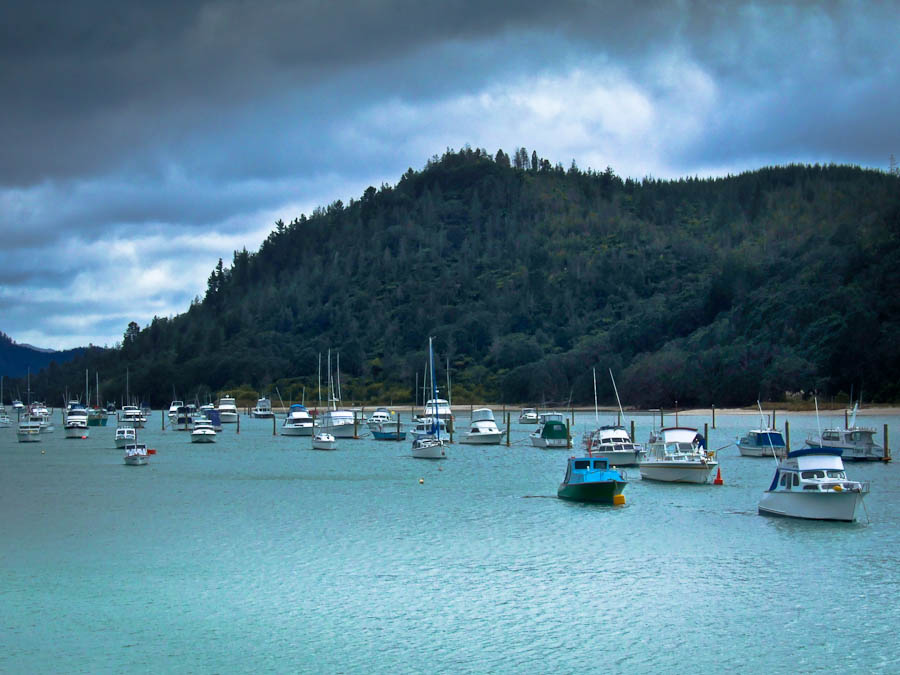
Whangamatā Harbour

A controversial marina has been constructed on the Whangamatā estuary. An Environment Court hearing stipulated that the marina could go ahead as long as certain conditions were met. Chris Carter, a former Minister of Conservation, blocked the development but his decision was judicially reviewed by the marina developers.

The decision was sent back to Conservation Minister Chris Carter, who stated that in the interests of transparency he would then give the final decision to Environment Minister David Benson-Pope, who allowed the marina to go ahead provided that strict conditions were met regarding containment of dredged materials during construction and monitoring of the surf break at the estuary's entrance. The marina opened in November 2009.

== Climate ==
Climate data for Whangamatā (Tairua Forest) (1971–1993)
Month	Jan	Feb	Mar	Apr	May	Jun	Jul	Aug	Sep	Oct	Nov	Dec	Year
Record high °C (°F)	32.5 (90.5)	31.7 (89.1)	34.0 (93.2)	26.3 (79.3)	23.1 (73.6)	21.8 (71.2)	19.8 (67.6)	20.0 (68.0)	24.0 (75.2)	25.5 (77.9)	28.0 (82.4)	29.0 (84.2)	34.0 (93.2)
Mean maximum °C (°F)	28.3 (82.9)	27.8 (82.0)	26.4 (79.5)	23.9 (75.0)	20.7 (69.3)	18.9 (66.0)	18.0 (64.4)	18.4 (65.1)	20.5 (68.9)	22.2 (72.0)	24.3 (75.7)	26.5 (79.7)	29.2 (84.6)
Mean daily maximum °C (°F)	23.9 (75.0)	23.7 (74.7)	22.3 (72.1)	19.9 (67.8)	17.2 (63.0)	15.0 (59.0)	14.5 (58.1)	15.1 (59.2)	16.6 (61.9)	18.3 (64.9)	20.3 (68.5)	22.2 (72.0)	19.1 (66.4)
Daily mean °C (°F)	19.2 (66.6)	19.1 (66.4)	17.8 (64.0)	15.2 (59.4)	12.6 (54.7)	10.6 (51.1)	9.9 (49.8)	10.6 (51.1)	12.3 (54.1)	13.9 (57.0)	15.9 (60.6)	17.5 (63.5)	14.6 (58.2)
Mean daily minimum °C (°F)	14.4 (57.9)	14.5 (58.1)	13.2 (55.8)	10.5 (50.9)	8.0 (46.4)	6.2 (43.2)	5.3 (41.5)	6.0 (42.8)	8.0 (46.4)	9.4 (48.9)	11.4 (52.5)	12.8 (55.0)	10.0 (49.9)
Mean minimum °C (°F)	8.3 (46.9)	8.9 (48.0)	6.7 (44.1)	4.1 (39.4)	1.7 (35.1)	0.0 (32.0)	−0.4 (31.3)	−0.3 (31.5)	1.9 (35.4)	3.3 (37.9)	5.3 (41.5)	6.8 (44.2)	−1.9 (28.6)
Record low °C (°F)	4.0 (39.2)	4.9 (40.8)	3.4 (38.1)	0.5 (32.9)	−0.3 (31.5)	−3.2 (26.2)	−4.0 (24.8)	−4.5 (23.9)	−1.0 (30.2)	1.2 (34.2)	−1.9 (28.6)	0.6 (33.1)	−4.5 (23.9)
Average rainfall mm (inches)	116.8 (4.60)	128.8 (5.07)	174.1 (6.85)	141.4 (5.57)	108.7 (4.28)	179.3 (7.06)	128.2 (5.05)	189.3 (7.45)	116.4 (4.58)	107.3 (4.22)	123.2 (4.85)	108.6 (4.28)	1,622.1 (63.86)
Source: Earth Sciences NZ (rainfall 1981–2010)

== See also ==
- Whangamata Beach Hop
