= Thames-Coromandel District Council =

Territorial authority of New Zealand

Coordinates: 37.138247°S 175.5409228°E

Type
- Term limits: None

History
- Founded: 6 March 1989

Leadership
- Mayor: Peter Revell
- Deputy mayor: John Grant

Structure
- Seats: 11 seats (1 mayor, 10 ward seats)
- Political groups: Independent (11)
- Length of term: 3 years

Elections
- Last election: 2025
- Next election: 2028

Website
- tcdc.govt.nz

Thames-Coromandel District Council is the territorial authority for the Thames-Coromandel District of New Zealand's North Island. It serves as the district's local government, with the Waikato Regional Council serving as the regional authority. It has existed since 1975, surviving in a re-constituted form through the 1989 reforms to local government.

The council has 10 councillors and is chaired by the mayor of Thames-Coromandel (currently Peter Revell since October 2025).

In 2026 24,456 were registered to vote in the District.

== Composition ==
The council currently consists of a mayor elected at-large and 10 councillors, elected from five wards. One councillor is returned from Te Tara o Te Ika Māori ward, which covers the entire district, one from Coromandel-Colville general ward, three from Mercury Bay general ward, two from South-Eastern general ward and three from Thames general ward.

=== Current council ===
The present council was elected in the 2025 local elections:

Thames-Coromandel District Council, 2025–2028
Position	Name	Ward	Affiliation
Mayor	Peter Revell	At-large	Independent
Deputy mayor	John Grant	Mercury Bay	Independent
Councillor	Michael Barlow	Te Tara o te Ika	Independent
Councillor	Robert Ashman	Coromandel-Colville	Independent
Councillor	Tony Brljevich	Mercury Bay	Independent
Councillor	Flemming Rasmussen	Mercury Bay	Independent
Councillor	John Freer	South East	Independent
Councillor	Alison Smith	South East	Independent
Councillor	Greg Hampton	Thames	Independent
Councillor	Martin Rodley	Thames	Independent
Councillor	Robyn Sinclair	Thames	Independent

=== Community boards ===
The Thames-Coromandel District Council currently has five community boards:

Thames Coromandel District Council community boards
Community board	Elected members			Council appointees
Community board	Chair	Deputy chair	Board members	Council appointees
Coromandel-Colville	Gavin Jeffcoat	Kate James	Jean Ashby; James Davis	Cr Robert Ashman
Mercury Bay	Richard Shelford-Woodcock	Kim Abrahamson	Rob Davis; Peter MacKenzie	Deputy mayor John Grant; Cr Flemming Rasmussen; Cr Tony Brljevich
Tairua-Pāuanui	Warwick Brooks	Georgina Bond	Michael Bush; Barry Roberts	Cr Alison Smith; Cr John Freer
Thames	Adrian Catran	Rob Johnston	Holly MacKenzie; Cole McDowell	Cr Martin Rodley; Cr Greg Hampton; Cr Robyn Sinclair
Whangamatā	Mark Drury	Neil Evans	Sally Smith; Terry Walker	Cr Alison Smith; Cr John Freer

== History ==
The area was under the authority of the Auckland Province government from 1853 to 1876. It was divided into the territories of Coromandel County Council and Thames County Council from 1876 to 1975. It came under the authority of the Thames/Coromandel District Council from 1975 to 1989. The current council was established in 1989.

== Elections ==
- 1977
- 1980
- 1983
- 1986
- 1989
- 1992
- 1995
- 1998
- 2001
- 2004
- 2007
- 2010
- 2013
- 2016
- 2019
- 2022
- 2025
