= Tairua River =

River in New Zealand

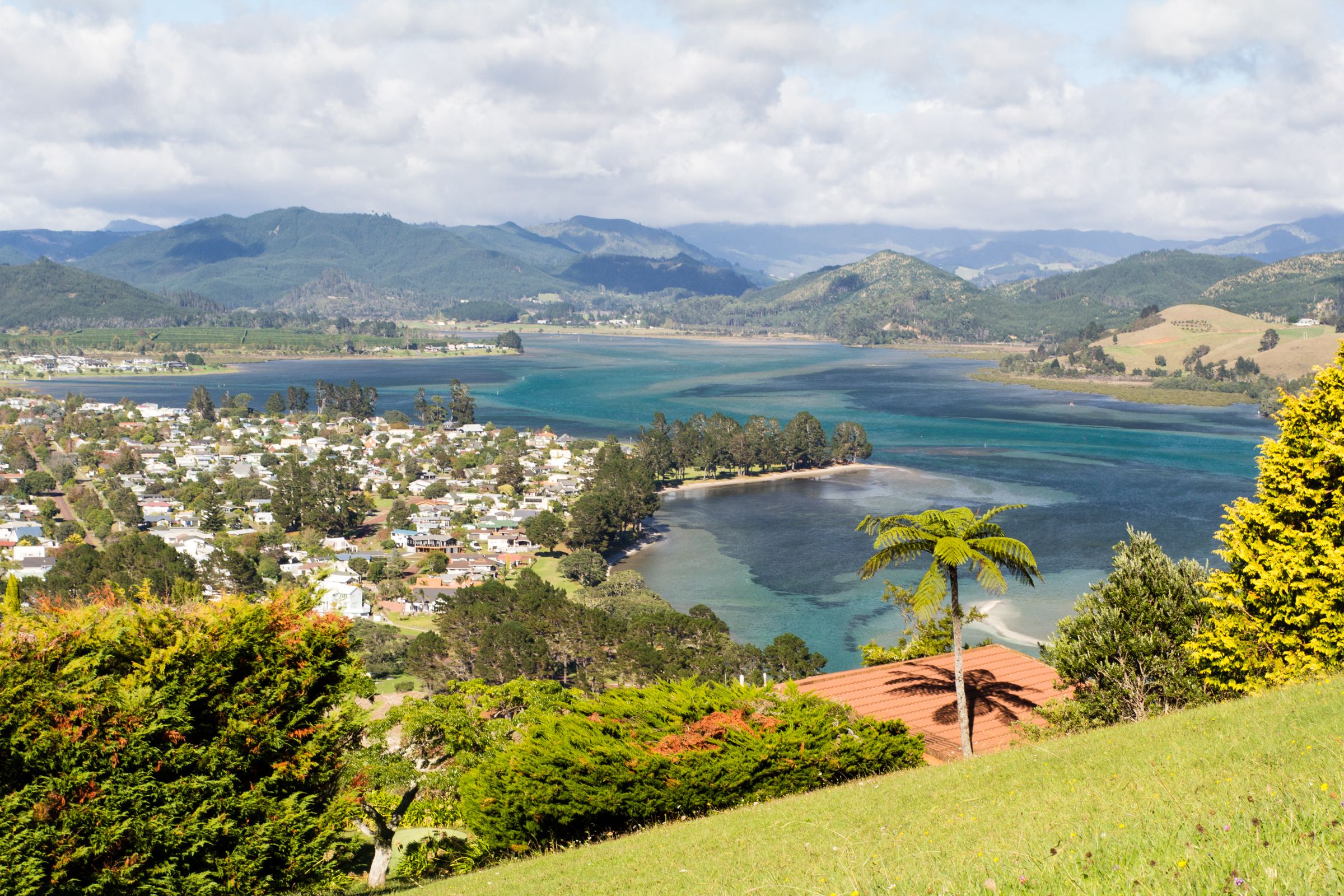
Tairua Harbour, output of the Tairua river into the Pacific

The Tairua River is a river located on the east coast of the Coromandel Peninsula in the North Island of New Zealand. It flows north and then northeast for a total of 35 kilometers (22 miles) from its source in the Coromandel Range, west of Whangamatā, passing through the town of Hikuai before emptying into the Tairua Harbour, which opens into the Pacific Ocean at Tairua on the peninsula's east coast. The small Shoe Island lies directly opposite the river's mouth, 2 kilometers (1.2 miles) out into the Pacific.

The Tairua River is used for recreational angling. It contains a variety of fish species, including rainbow trout.
