= Thames-Coromandel District =

- Territorial authority district
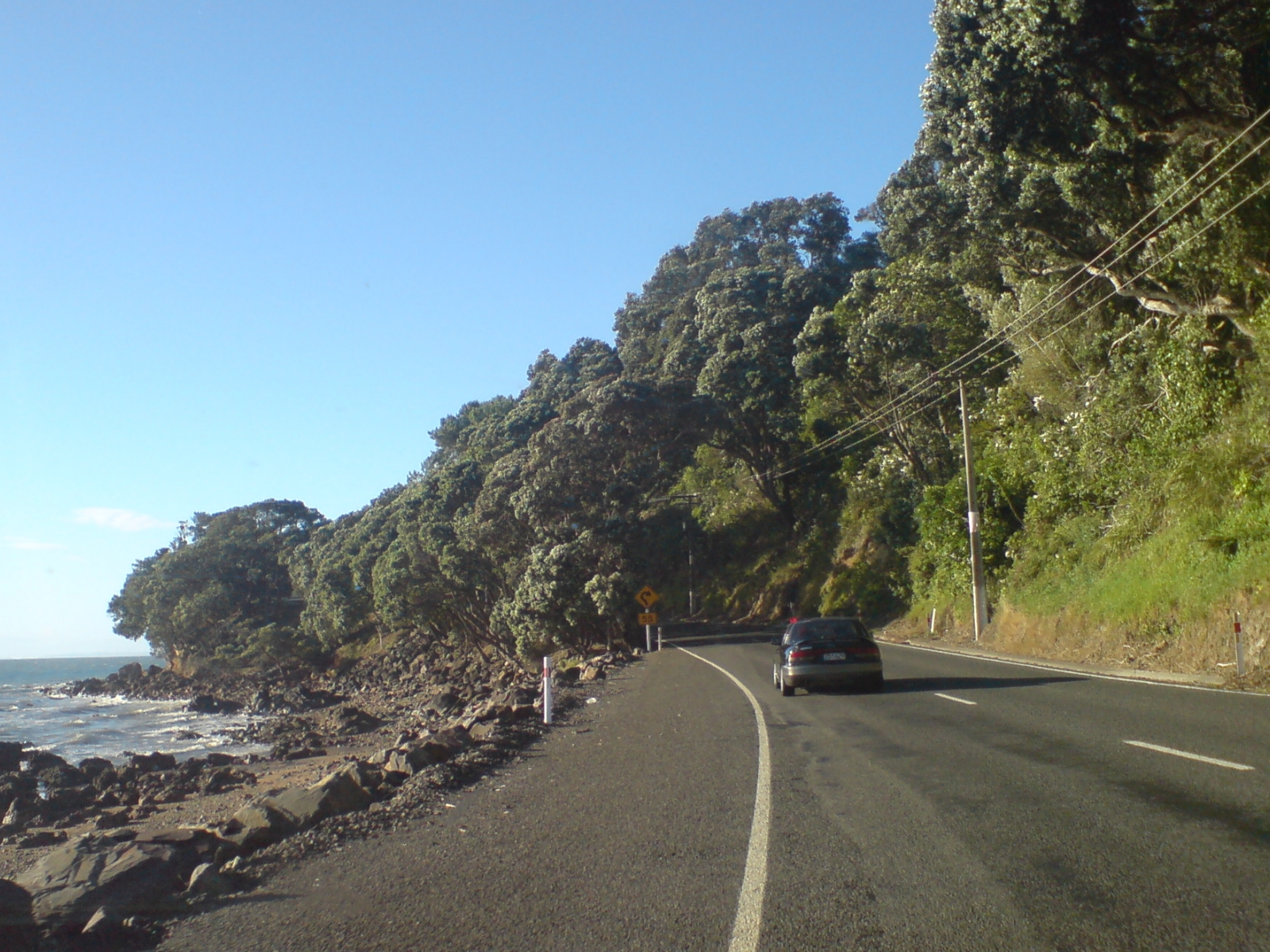
- The road northwards from Thames. Somewhere south of Te Mata.

- Thames-Coromandel district within the North Island
- Coordinates: 36°56′31″S 175°40′34″E
- Country: New Zealand
- Region: Waikato
- Wards: Coromandel-Colville; Mercury Bay; South East; Thames
- Formed: 1975
- Seat: Thames

Government
  - Mayor: Peter Revell
  - Territorial authority: Thames-Coromandel District Council

Area
  - Land: 2,207.59 km^{2} (852.36 sq mi)

Population (June 2025)
  - Total: 32,200
  - Density: 14.6/km^{2} (37.8/sq mi)
- Time zone: UTC+12 (NZST)
  - Summer (DST): UTC+13 (NZDT)
- Postcode(s): Map of postcodes
- Website: Thames-Coromandel District Council

The Thames-Coromandel District is a territorial authority district in the North Island of New Zealand, covering all the Coromandel Peninsula and extending south to Hikutaia.

It is administered by the Thames-Coromandel District Council, which has its seat in the town of Thames. It was the first district council to be formed in New Zealand, being constituted in 1975. The district lies within the Waikato Regional Council area. Its only land boundary is with Hauraki District.

== Demographics ==
The district had a population of 32,200 in June 2025. 7,230 live in Thames, 6,140 in Whitianga, 4,230 in Whangamatā, and 1,780 in Coromandel. It covers 2,207.59 km^{2} (852.36 sq mi) and had a population density of 14.6 people per km^{2}.

Historical population
Year	Pop.	±% p.a.
2006	25,938	—
2013	26,178	+0.13%
2018	29,895	+2.69%
2023	31,995	+1.37%

Thames-Coromandel District had a population of 31,995 in the 2023 New Zealand census, an increase of 2,100 people (7.0%) since the 2018 census, and an increase of 5,817 people (22.2%) since the 2013 census. There were 15,729 males, 16,182 females and 87 people of other genders in 13,557 dwellings. 2.3% of people identified as LGBTIQ+. The median age was 55.2 years (compared with 38.1 years nationally). There were 4,365 people (13.6%) aged under 15 years, 3,528 (11.0%) aged 15 to 29, 13,284 (41.5%) aged 30 to 64, and 10,821 (33.8%) aged 65 or older.

People could identify as more than one ethnicity. The results were 88.4% European (Pākehā); 18.8% Māori; 2.5% Pasifika; 3.6% Asian; 0.6% Middle Eastern, Latin American and African New Zealanders (MELAA); and 2.5% other, which includes people giving their ethnicity as "New Zealander". English was spoken by 98.3%, Māori language by 3.9%, Samoan by 0.2% and other languages by 6.6%. No language could be spoken by 1.2% (e.g. too young to talk). New Zealand Sign Language was known by 0.4%. The percentage of people born overseas was 16.9, compared with 28.8% nationally.

Religious affiliations were 28.0% Christian, 0.7% Hindu, 0.1% Islam, 1.0% Māori religious beliefs, 0.9% Buddhist, 0.6% New Age, 0.1% Jewish, and 1.3% other religions. People who answered that they had no religion were 58.8%, and 8.6% of people did not answer the census question.

Of those at least 15 years old, 3,582 (13.0%) people had a bachelor's or higher degree, 15,453 (55.9%) had a post-high school certificate or diploma, and 7,461 (27.0%) people exclusively held high school qualifications. The median income was $30,000, compared with $41,500 nationally. 1,848 people (6.7%) earned over $100,000 compared to 12.1% nationally. The employment status of those at least 15 was that 9,969 (36.1%) people were employed full-time, 4,404 (15.9%) were part-time, and 645 (2.3%) were unemployed.

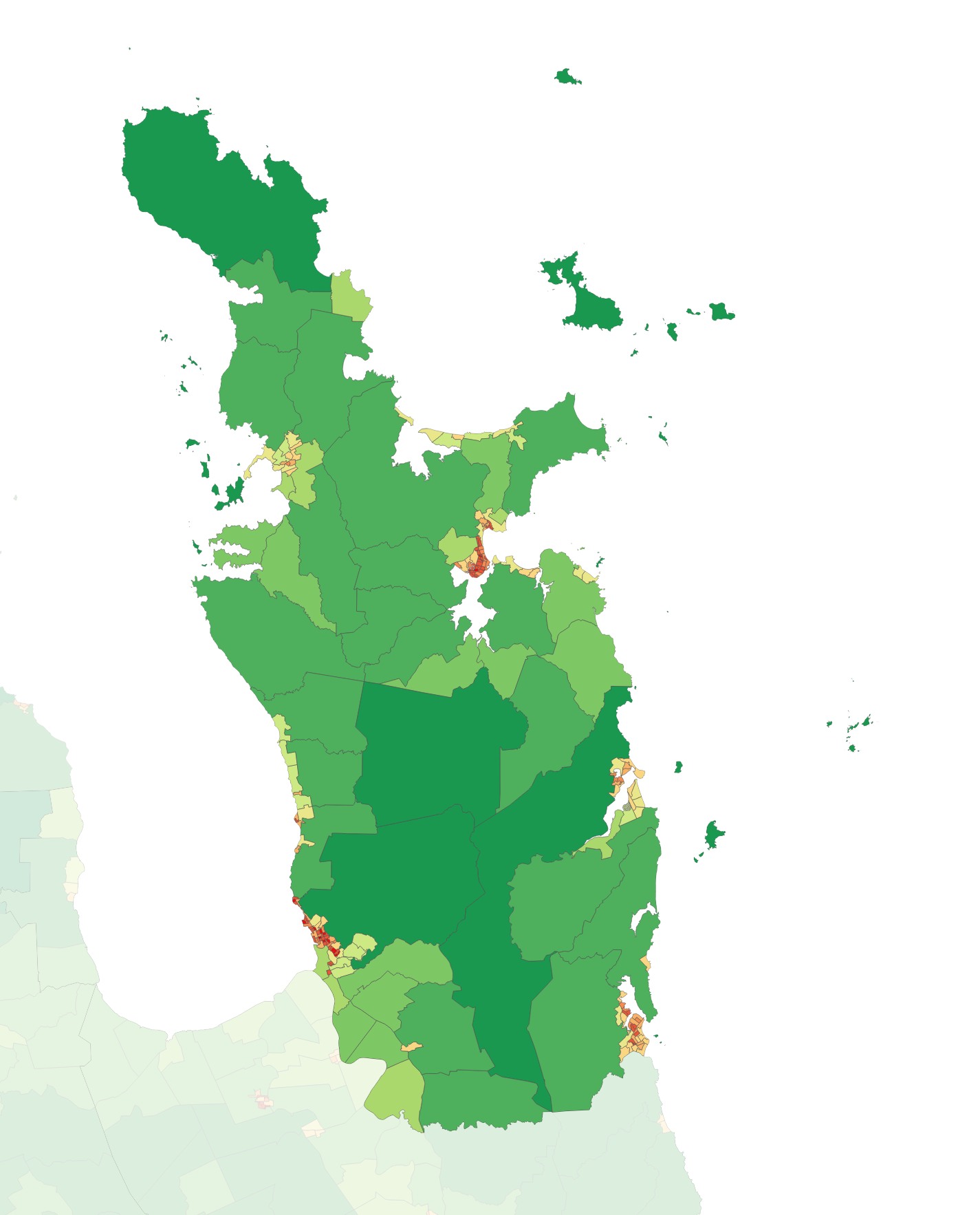
Population density in the 2023 census

Individual wards
Name	Area (km^{2})	Population	Density (per km^{2})	Dwellings	Median age	Median income
Coromandel-Colville Ward	560.29	3,345	6.0	1,353	55.1 years	$27,800
Mercury Bay Ward	709.67	10,134	14.3	4,329	53.4 years	$31,900
Thames Ward	473.19	10,737	22.7	4,425	54.5 years	$29,400
South East Ward	464.44	7,779	16.7	3,450	59.1 years	$30,800
New Zealand					38.1 years	$41,500

== Local government ==
The Thames-Coromandel District Council was formed from the amalgamation of the Thames Borough, Thames County and Coromandel County councils in 1975, and is led by the Mayor of Thames-Coromandel.

=== History ===
In 1923, the constituent counties included -

	area	population	gravel roads	mud roads	tracks
Coromandel County	440 mi^{2} (1,100 km^{2})	2,120	42 mi (68 km)	74 mi (119 km)	189 mi (304 km)
Thames County	413 mi^{2} (1,070 km^{2})	5,373	52 mi (84 km)	26 mi (42 km)	155 mi (249 km)
Thames Borough	3,670 acres (14.9 km^{2})	4,765			
Totals	2,185 km^{2} (844 sq mi)	12,258			
