= Coromandel Peninsula =

Peninsula in New Zealand

Coordinates: 36°50′S 175°35′E

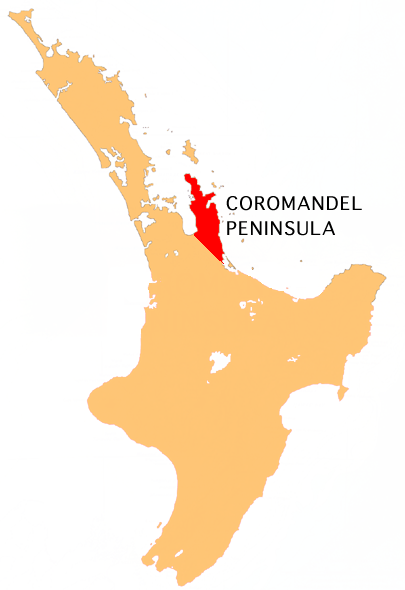
Location of Coromandel Peninsula

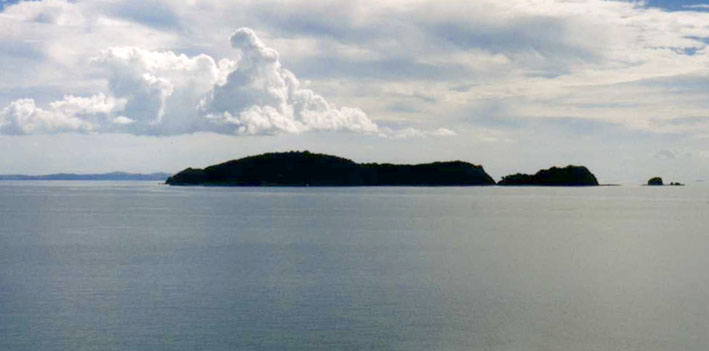
Motukawao Islands and Hauraki Gulf from near Colville

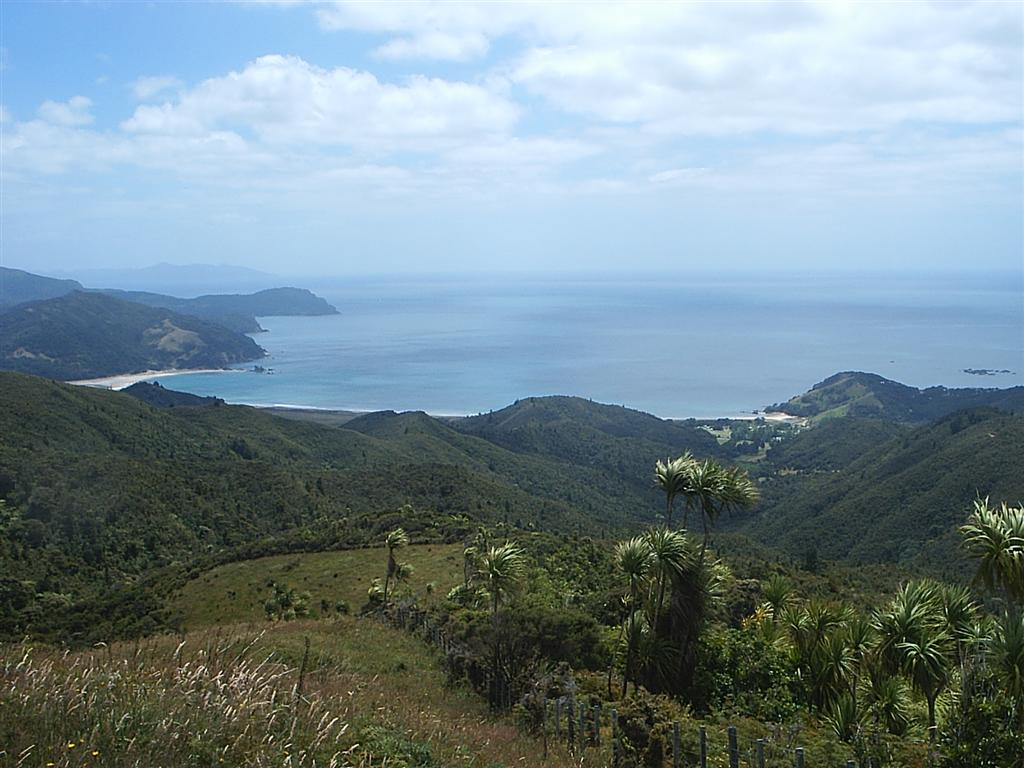
Waikawau Bay

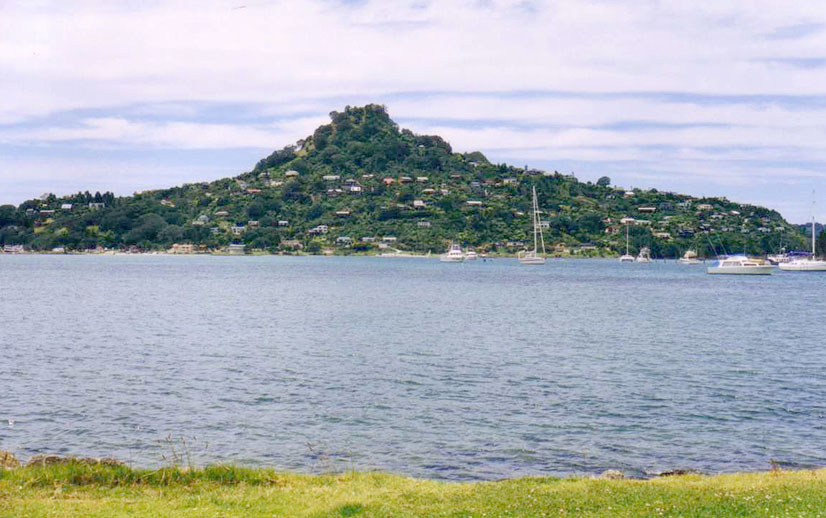
Tairua

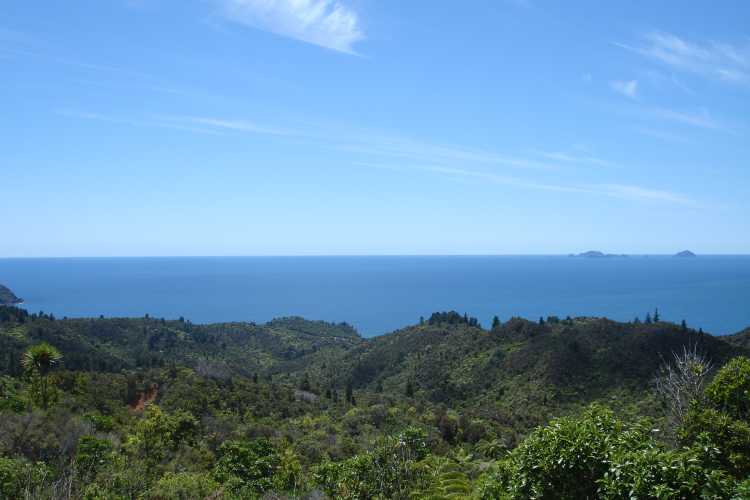
View over Mercury Bay from the Tairua–Whitianga road

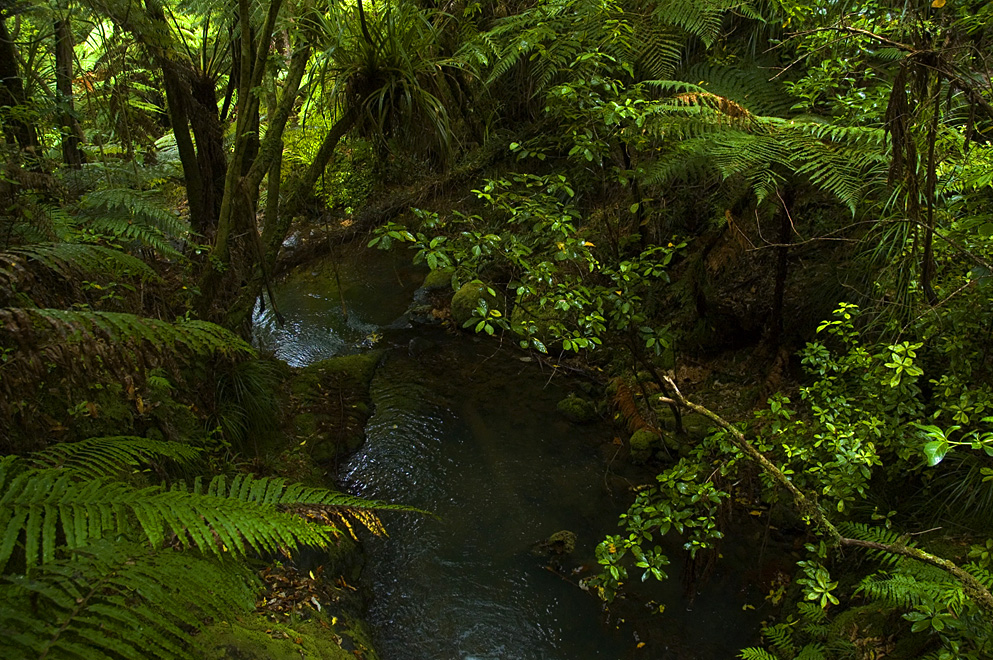
Rainforest of inland Coromandel Peninsula

The Coromandel Peninsula (Māori: Te Tara-o-te-Ika-a-Māui) on the North Island of New Zealand extends 85 kilometres (53 mi) north from the western end of the Bay of Plenty, forming a natural barrier protecting the Hauraki Gulf and the Firth of Thames in the west from the Pacific Ocean to the east. It is 40 kilometres (25 mi) wide at its broadest point. Almost its entire population lives on the narrow coastal strips fronting the Hauraki Gulf and the Bay of Plenty. In clear weather the peninsula is clearly visible from Auckland, the country's biggest city, which lies on the far shore of the Hauraki Gulf, 55 kilometres (34 mi) to the west. The peninsula is part of the Thames-Coromandel District and the Waikato Region.

== Names ==
The Māori name for the peninsula is Te Tara-o-te-Ika-a-Māui, meaning "the barb of Māui's fish". This comes from the legend of Māui and the Fish, in which the demigod uses his hook to catch a great fish (Te Ika-a-Māui or the North Island) from the depths of the Pacific Ocean. In Hauraki Māori tradition, the fish is likened to a stingray, with the Wellington Region being its head, the Northland Peninsula its tail, and Coromandel Peninsula its barb or spine.

The English-language name for the peninsula comes from HMS Coromandel (originally named HMS Malabar), a ship of the British Royal Navy that stopped at Coromandel Harbour in 1820 to buy kauri spars. The ship was named for the Coromandel Coast of India.

== Geography ==
The peninsula is steep and hilly and largely covered in bush. The Coromandel Range forms the spine for most of the peninsula, with the Moehau Range at the northern end providing the highest point at nearly 900 metres (3,000 ft). The large Great Barrier Island, which lies beyond the northern tip, can be thought of as an extension of the ranges. The island is separated from Cape Colville on the peninsula's northern coast by the Colville Channel.

Although the peninsula is close to large centres of population such as Auckland to the west and Tauranga to the southeast, its rugged nature means that much of it is relatively isolated, and the interior and northern tip are both largely undeveloped and sparsely inhabited. The Coromandel Forest Park covers much of the inland part of the peninsula.

Numerous small islands and island groups lie offshore, such as the Motukawao Islands to the northwest, the Aldermen Islands and Slipper Island to the southeast, and the Mercury Islands to the northeast.

The peninsula shows considerable signs of past volcanism. It comprises the eroded remnants of the Coromandel Volcanic Zone, which was highly active during the Miocene and Pliocene periods. Volcanic activity has since primarily shifted southeast to the Taupō Volcanic Zone, although Mayor Island / Tūhua some 25 km to the east was recently active. Geothermal activity is still present on the peninsula, with hot springs in several places, notably at Hot Water Beach (in the central east coast between Whitianga and Tairua) and near Te Aroha.

== People ==
Owing to the nature of the land, much of the Coromandel's population clusters in a small number of towns and communities along the southeastern and southwestern coasts. Only five towns have populations of over 1000 (Coromandel, Whitianga, Thames, Tairua, and Whangamatā), and of these only Thames, with 7,230 people, and Whitianga, with 6,140 people, have populations of over 5000. Several small towns dot the coast of the Firth of Thames in the southwest. Other small towns on the peninsula include Te Puru, Matarangi, Whangapoua, Whiritoa, Hikuai, Port Jackson, Port Charles, Tairua, Pauanui and Colville. The population of several of these centres is highly seasonal, with many Aucklanders having holiday homes in the Coromandel. (Note: Normal New Zealand usage tends to refer to places informally as being "in the Coromandel" rather than "on the Coromandel Peninsula".) During the summer holiday period around Christmas and New Year, visiting families and travellers from around the North Island add significantly to activity in the area, particularly in Whangamatā, Whitianga, Matarangi, Tairua and Pauanui.

The peninsula is a popular place to live for people who have chosen an alternative lifestyle, especially those who have left Auckland. The 1970s saw thousands of hippies relocate from large cities around New Zealand to the Coromandel in search of an environmentally friendly lifestyle associated with the counterculture back-to-the-land movement. As of 2010, increasing numbers of affluent Aucklanders have started moving to the Coromandel.

Population density decreases with both distance from the coast and distance north. Of the main population centres, only Coromandel, Colville, Matarangi and Whitianga lie in the north of the peninsula, and much of the inland parts remain virtually uninhabited.

== History ==
Prior to contact with Europeans, the Tahanga Quarries of Opito Bay were an important source of basalt (karā or pakawera), which Māori used in the production of stone tools such as adzes (particularly during the Māori Archaic period (1300–1500)).

== Industries and attractions ==
The area was once known largely for its hard-rock gold mining and kauri gum digging and forestry industries, but is now a popular tourist destination. Most mining ceased around the 1980s. In late 2009, New Zealand's Energy and Resources Minister Gerry Brownlee (National Party) noted that there was a possibility of new mining in conservation areas, even though he had previously declared that a stocktake of mineral resources in protected areas did not indicate a desire to mine there.

A forest park occupies much of the centre of the peninsula, and the coasts are dotted with numerous beaches and scenic views. Evidence of the region's geothermal origins can be found in hot springs, notably at Hot Water Beach on the peninsula's east coast. The town of Whangamatā is a popular holiday retreat, and Whitianga on Mercury Bay is renowned for its yachting. The peninsula's waters are also a popular destination for scuba divers. Cathedral Cove, named for its cathedral-like arch through the limestone cliff, is a popular destination, only accessible by boat or on foot. In recent years, dolphins and more coast-loving whales are appearing along the coasts as their numbers began to recover, such as southern right whale, Bryde's whale and humpback whale.

== Transport ==
The towns are connected by State Highways 25 and 25A, which form a circuit around the peninsula. Not all of the roads on the peninsula are sealed (i.e. are gravel roads) notably the 309 Road, which connects Coromandel Town and Whitianga. Some hire car companies have contracts that specifically exclude driving on these roads. A passenger ferry runs from Ferry Landing to Whitianga, providing direct access to the shops and restaurants of Whitianga for pedestrians and cyclists based in Cook's Beach, Flaxmill Bay, Front Beach, and Ferry Landing. The ferry takes only 5 minutes to cross the harbour, while the trip by road takes 40 to 45 minutes.

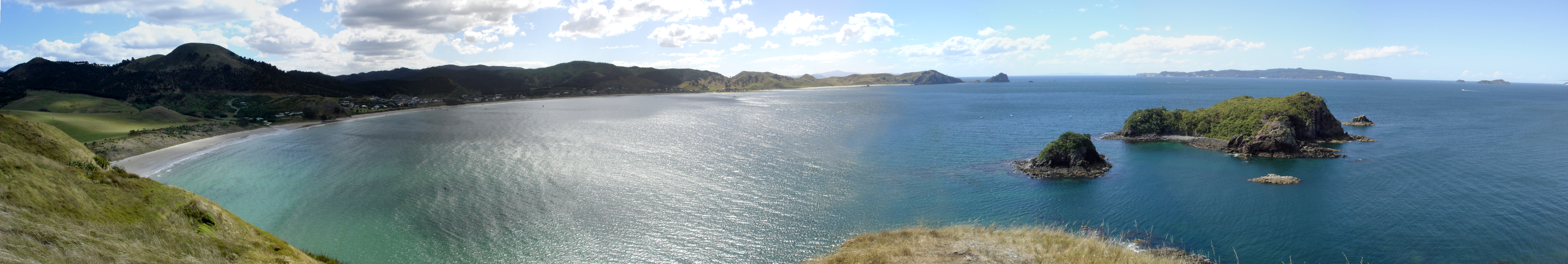
Opito Bay on the east coast of Coromandel Peninsula
