= Tomarata Lake =

Lake in the Auckland Region, New Zealand

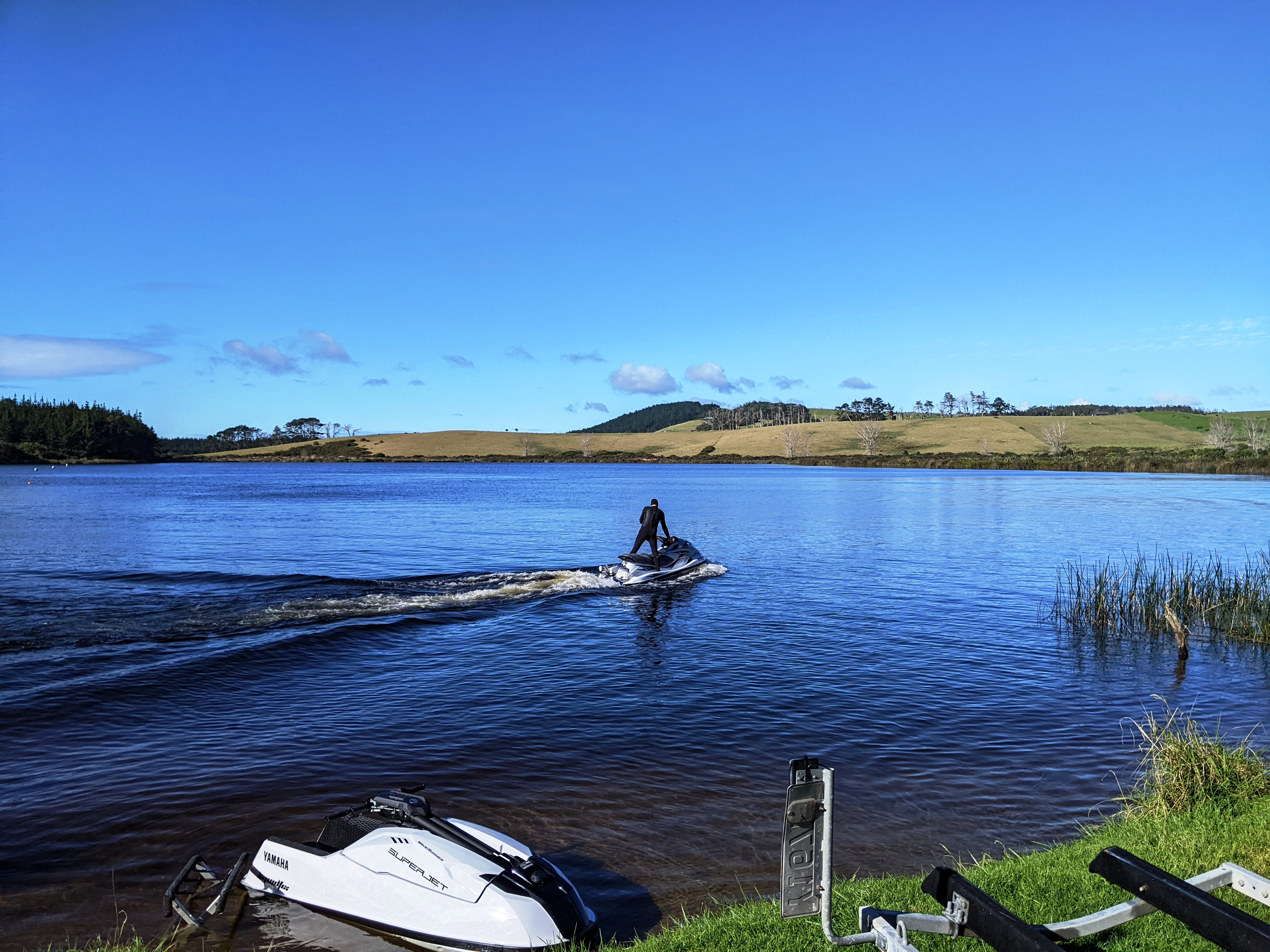
- Jetskiing at Tomarata Lake in 2022

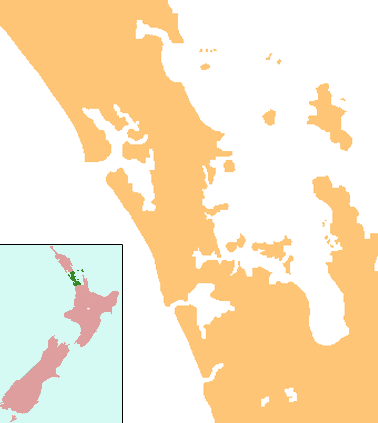
- Location within New Zealand Auckland
- Location: Auckland Region, North Island, New Zealand
- Coordinates: 36.194°S 174.651°E
- Primary outflows: Spectacle Lake
- Basin countries: New Zealand
- Max. length: 600 metres (2,000 ft)
- Max. width: 320 metres (1,050 ft)
- Surface area: 14.4 ha (36 acres)
- Max. depth: 6 metres (20 ft)
- Surface elevation: 23 m (75 ft)

Tomarata Lake is a lake at Tomarata, Rodney in the northern Auckland Region of New Zealand.

== Geography ==
Tomarata Lake is a sand dune lake located around 15 km (9.3 mi) northeast of Wellsford. It is adjacent to the Mangawhai Forest and near Te Ārai Regional Park. The lake drains into Spectacle Lake, which in turn drains into Slipper Lake, and eventually flows into the Jellicoe Channel. A former sand quarry is located near the lake, which over time developed into a lake itself.

The lake was created when the Te Ārai sand dunes began to build up, preventing water from escaping the area. It is the only example of a peatland lake in the Auckland Region. The lake has no inflow streams, and is instead fed by rainwater and the surrounding wetlands.

== Biodiversity ==
The lake is a part of the Tomarata — Te Ārai Dune Lakes biodiversity focus area, and is surrounded by extensive wetlands.

The lake is home to many threatened bird species, such as the New Zealand fernbird, Eurasian bittern and the Buff-banded rail.

== Recreation ==
The lake is used for recreational swimming, boating and jetskiing, and is the most accessible of the northern Rodney lakes.

== See also ==
- List of lakes of New Zealand
