= Gannet (disambiguation) =

The gannet is a seabird. It may also refer to:

== Geography ==
- Gannet Island (Western Australia)
- Gannet Islands, Labrador, Canada – see Gannet Islands Ecological Reserve
- Kārewa / Gannet Island, New Zealand
- Gannet Rock, New Zealand
- Gannet Lake, Georgia, United States

== Aircraft ==
- Colyaer Gannet S100, a Spanish flying boat
- Fairey Gannet, a British Cold-War era naval aircraft
- Gloster Gannet, a British pre-Second World War aircraft
- Grumman Gannet, the original name for the British Fleet Air Arm version of the Grumman Hellcat fighter
- Tugan Gannet, a small, twin-engine airliner built in Australia in the 1930s

== Ships ==
- HMS Gannet, nine Royal Navy ships and two shore establishments
- USS Gannet (AM-41), a minesweeper laid down in 1918
- USS Gannet (MSC-290), a minesweeper laid down in 1959

== Other uses ==
- Gannet oil and gas field, North Sea

== See also ==
- Gannett (disambiguation)
