= Colville, New Zealand =

Colville
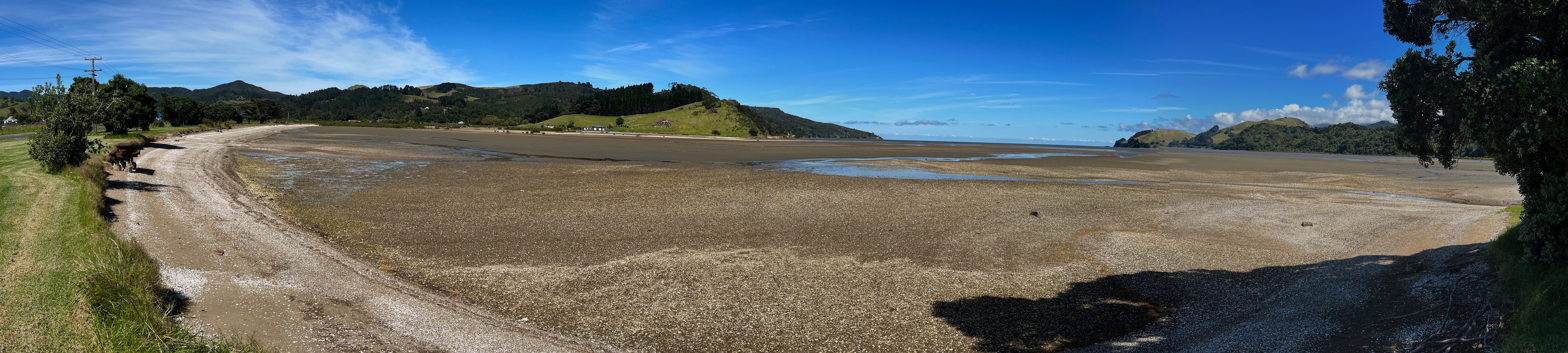
- Colville and Colville Bay
- Interactive map of Colville
- Coordinates: 36°38′3″S 175°28′35″E
- Country: New Zealand
- Region: Waikato
- District: Thames-Coromandel District
- Ward: Coromandel-Colville ward
- Community Board: Coromandel-Colville Community
- Electorates: Coromandel; Hauraki-Waikato (Māori)

Government
  - Council: Thames-Coromandel District Council
  - Regional council: Waikato Regional Council
  - Mayor of Thames-Coromandel: Peter Revell
  - Coromandel MP: Scott Simpson
  - Hauraki-Waikato MP: Hana-Rawhiti Maipi-Clarke

Area
  - Total: 44.28 km^{2} (17.10 sq mi)

Population (2023)
  - Total: 172
  - Density: 3.88/km^{2} (10.1/sq mi)

Colville (Māori: Te Umanga-wha-o-nga-waka), a small town in the north of the Coromandel Peninsula in the North Island of New Zealand, lies 26 kilometres north of Coromandel in Colville Bay on the Hauraki Gulf, and is the northernmost town of any note on the peninsula. North of Colville, 28 kilometres of rough road lead to the small settlement of Port Jackson, close to the peninsula's northwesternmost point, Cape Colville and 20 km to Port Charles on the northeastern side.

The town is the service and social centre for the area, with a co-operatively-owned general store, cafe, Postal Delivery Centre, volunteer fire brigade, school, community hall and several houses. Just beyond the town is the beginning of the Te Moehau Range, which forms the bulk of the northern end of the Coromandel Peninsula, and contains valuable ecological areas, including a population of the threatened North Island brown kiwi.

Colville the town took its name from the cape, which Captain James Cook named on 18 November 1769 after Rear Admiral Lord Colville, under whom Cook had previously served (1759–1761) on HMS Northumberland in the Royal Navy. Colville was also known as Cabbage Bay, thought to be in reference to the cabbage trees in the bay.

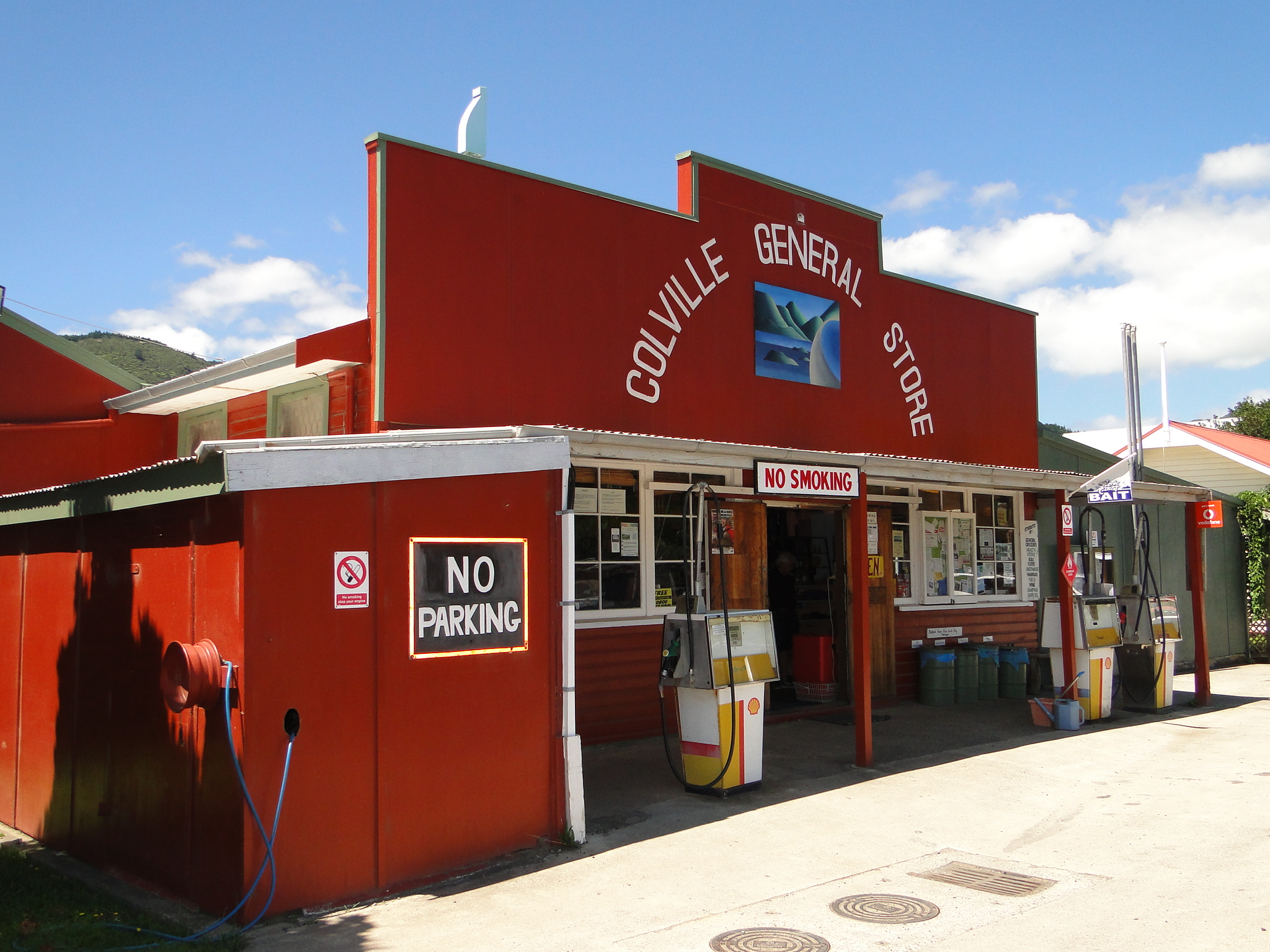
Colville General Store

Colville township grew following the construction of a general store with a motor garage alongside. This was built by Richard (Dick) Goudie, a local man whose grandparents had settled in Cabbage Bay. Dick Goudie later ran a taxi service from the town, being the first to drive a motor vehicle across the new bridge at Papa Aroha which opened up the northern peninsula from Coromandel. Fossicking for semi-precious stones such as carnelian and for kauri gum are popular activities among tourists visiting the town.

Another member of the Goudie family, John, developed a motor camp a few kilometres north of the town some years later.

The Motukawao Islands lie five kilometres off the coast to the southwest of Colville, in the Hauraki Gulf.

== Demographics ==
Colville township is in an SA1 statistical area which covers 44.28 km^{2} (17.10 sq mi) and includes the area around Colville Bay and to the east of it but not including the east coast of the peninsula. The SA1 area is part of the larger Colville statistical area.

Historical population of Colville and its surrounds
Year	Pop.	±% p.a.
2006	117	—
2013	129	+1.40%
2018	159	+4.27%
2023	174	+1.82%

The SA1 statistical area had a population of 174 in the 2023 New Zealand census, an increase of 15 people (9.4%) since the 2018 census, and an increase of 45 people (34.9%) since the 2013 census. There were 84 males, 90 females and 3 people of other genders in 57 dwellings. 6.9% of people identified as LGBTIQ+. The median age was 52.2 years (compared with 38.1 years nationally). There were 33 people (19.0%) aged under 15 years, 9 (5.2%) aged 15 to 29, 81 (46.6%) aged 30 to 64, and 51 (29.3%) aged 65 or older.

People could identify as more than one ethnicity. The results were 96.6% European (Pākehā); 12.1% Māori; 3.4% Pasifika; 3.4% Asian; and 1.7% Middle Eastern, Latin American and African New Zealanders (MELAA). English was spoken by 100.0%, Māori language by 3.4%, and other languages by 15.5%. The percentage of people born overseas was 20.7, compared with 28.8% nationally.

Religious affiliations were 15.5% Christian, 5.2% Buddhist, and 1.7% New Age. People who answered that they had no religion were 67.2%, and 10.3% of people did not answer the census question.

Of those at least 15 years old, 33 (23.4%) people had a bachelor's or higher degree, 78 (55.3%) had a post-high school certificate or diploma, and 30 (21.3%) people exclusively held high school qualifications. The median income was $23,200, compared with $41,500 nationally. 3 people (2.1%) earned over $100,000 compared to 12.1% nationally. The employment status of those at least 15 was that 42 (29.8%) people were employed full-time, 27 (19.1%) were part-time, and 6 (4.3%) were unemployed.

=== Colville statistical area ===
Colville statistical area is much larger than the town, and covers the western side of the Coromandel Peninsula north of the Waikawau River and the entire area north of and including Kennedy Bay, but excludes Coromandel town. It covers 543.30 km^{2} (209.77 sq mi) and had an estimated population of 1,560 as of June 2025, with a population density of 2.9 people per km^{2}.

Historical population for Colville statistical area
Year	Pop.	±% p.a.
2006	1,371	—
2013	1,290	−0.87%
2018	1,485	+2.86%
2023	1,563	+1.03%

Colville statistical area had a population of 1,563 in the 2023 New Zealand census, an increase of 78 people (5.3%) since the 2018 census, and an increase of 273 people (21.2%) since the 2013 census. There were 801 males, 762 females and 3 people of other genders in 582 dwellings. 2.7% of people identified as LGBTIQ+. The median age was 52.9 years (compared with 38.1 years nationally). There were 240 people (15.4%) aged under 15 years, 153 (9.8%) aged 15 to 29, 729 (46.6%) aged 30 to 64, and 438 (28.0%) aged 65 or older.

People could identify as more than one ethnicity. The results were 76.2% European (Pākehā); 40.3% Māori; 4.2% Pasifika; 1.2% Asian; 0.8% Middle Eastern, Latin American and African New Zealanders (MELAA); and 2.9% other, which includes people giving their ethnicity as "New Zealander". English was spoken by 98.3%, Māori language by 14.0%, Samoan by 0.2%, and other languages by 6.3%. No language could be spoken by 1.0% (e.g. too young to talk). New Zealand Sign Language was known by 0.2%. The percentage of people born overseas was 13.2, compared with 28.8% nationally.

Religious affiliations were 20.7% Christian, 4.8% Māori religious beliefs, 1.3% Buddhist, 1.2% New Age, 0.2% Jewish, and 1.2% other religions. People who answered that they had no religion were 63.3%, and 8.3% of people did not answer the census question.

Of those at least 15 years old, 231 (17.5%) people had a bachelor's or higher degree, 753 (56.9%) had a post-high school certificate or diploma, and 336 (25.4%) people exclusively held high school qualifications. The median income was $27,100, compared with $41,500 nationally. 81 people (6.1%) earned over $100,000 compared to 12.1% nationally. The employment status of those at least 15 was that 456 (34.5%) people were employed full-time, 213 (16.1%) were part-time, and 57 (4.3%) were unemployed.

== Education ==
Colville School, opened in 1891, is a coeducational full primary (years 1–8) school with a decile rating of 2 and a roll of 38 students as of July 2026.
