= Spectacle Lake (New Zealand) =

Lake in New Zealand

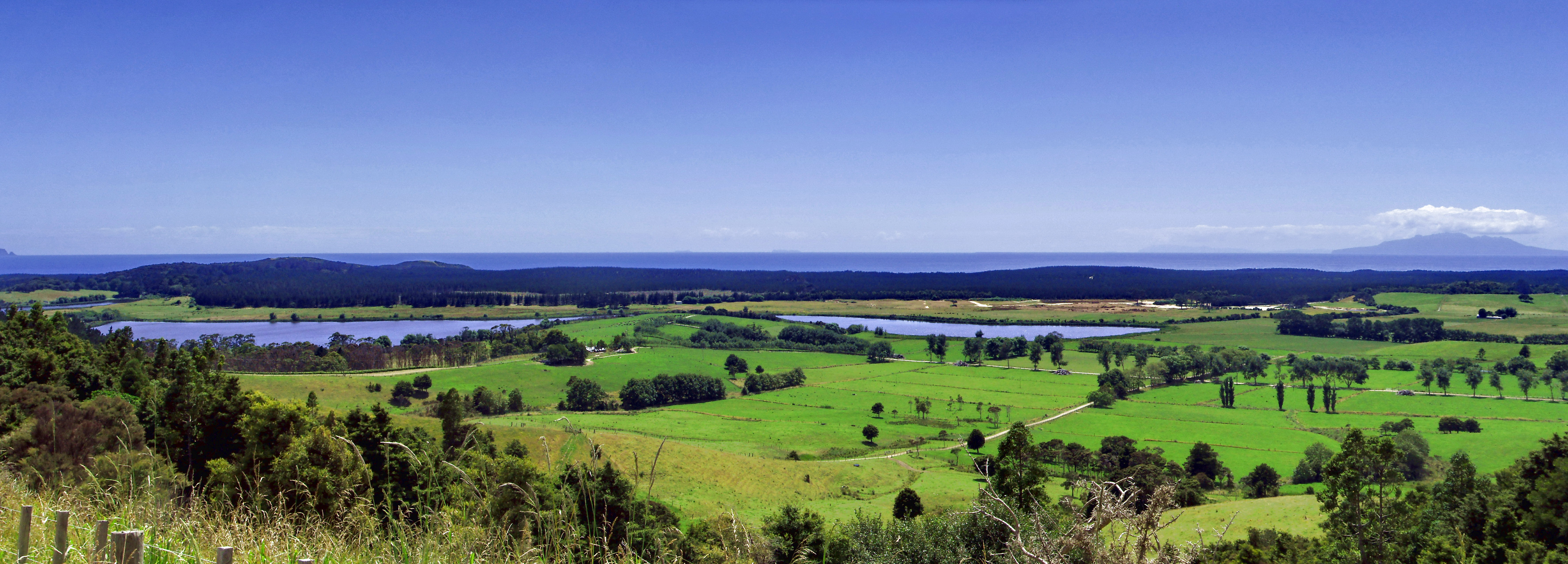
- Spectacle Lake in 2009

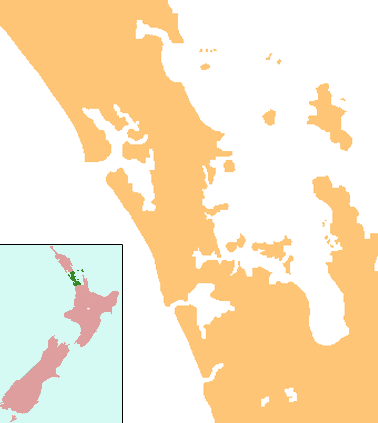
- Location within New Zealand Auckland
- Location: Auckland Region, North Island, New Zealand
- Coordinates: 36.18027°S 174.63027°E
- Primary inflows: Tomarata Lake
- Primary outflows: Slipper Lake
- Basin countries: New Zealand
- Max. length: 1,600 metres (5,200 ft)
- Max. width: 550 metres (1,800 ft)
- Surface area: 43.8 ha (108 acres)
- Max. depth: 7 metres (23 ft)

Spectacle Lake is a lake at Te Ārai, Rodney in the northern Auckland Region of New Zealand.

== Geography ==
Spectacle Lake is a sand dune lake located approximately 15 km (9.3 mi) northeast of Wellsford. The lake is fed by a small channel from Tomarata Lake to the southeast, and flows into Slipper Lake, which eventually flows into the Jellicoe Channel. The dune lakes are primarily fed by rainwater and the surrounding wetlands.

== Biodiversity ==
The lake is a part of the Tomarata — Te Ārai Dune Lakes biodiversity focus area.

== See also ==
- List of lakes of New Zealand
