= Waikawau River (Waikawau Bay) =

River in New Zealand

Coordinates: 36.58483°S 175.50194°E

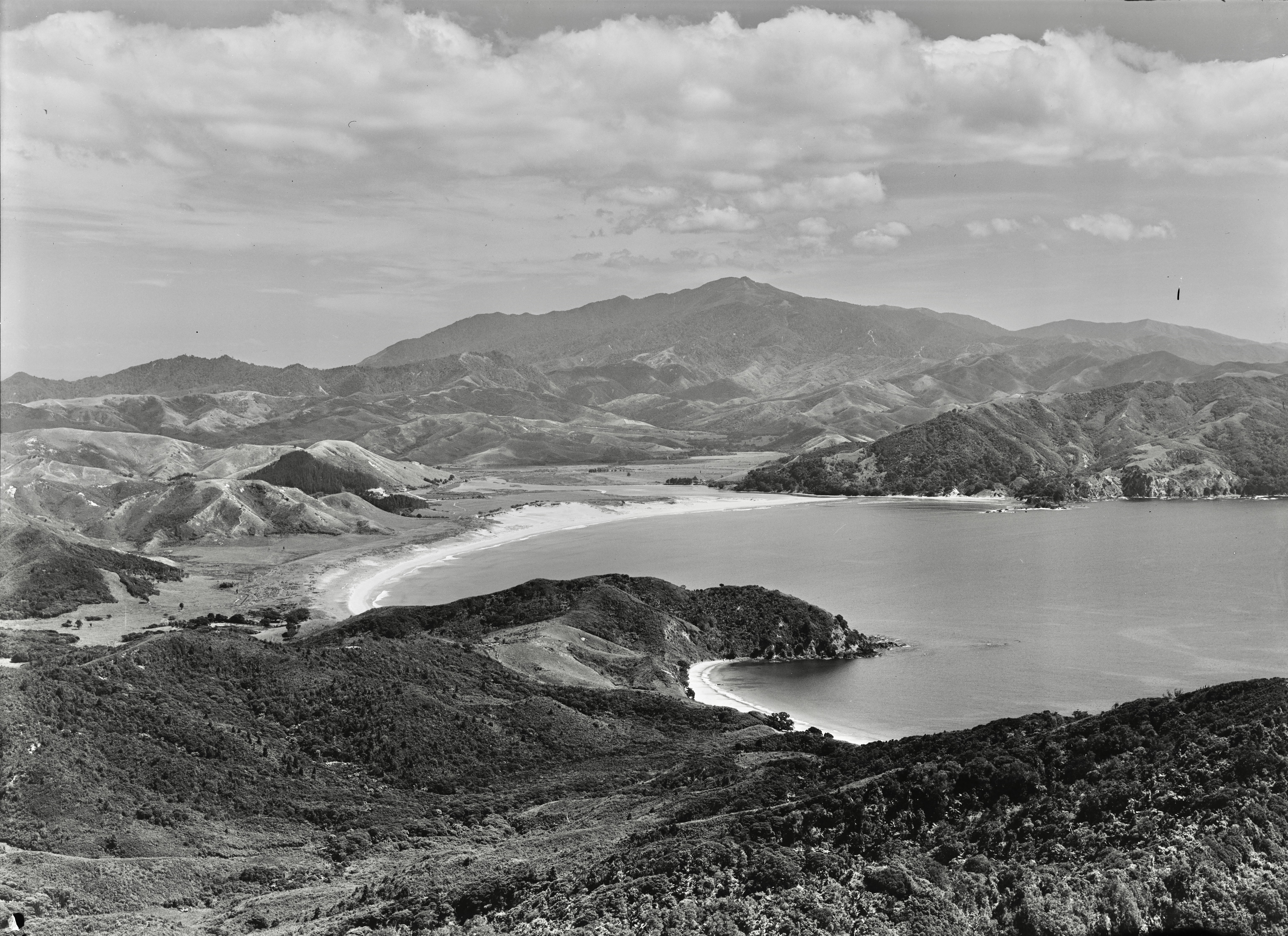
- Waikawau Bay and Waikawau River (centre)

Location
- Country: New Zealand

Physical characteristics
- Source
  - location: Onekura, Moehau Range
  - elevation: 374 m (1,227 ft)
- Mouth
  - location: Waikawau Bay, Pacific Ocean
  - elevation: 0m
- Length: 10 km (6 mi)

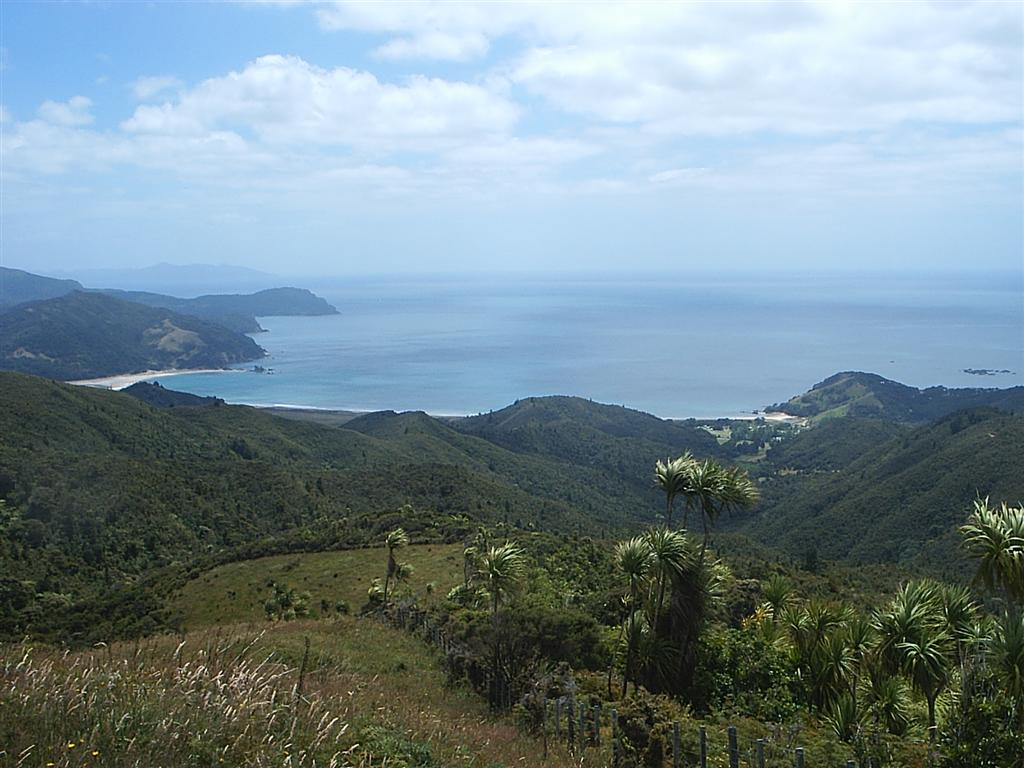
Coromandel Waikawau Bay

The Waikawau River is the name of two rivers on the Coromandel Peninsula in New Zealand's North Island, which each have nearby settlements called Waikawau. The more southerly flows generally west from its sources in the Coromandel Range, reaching the Firth of Thames at Waikawau Beach. This river flows south east off the Moehau Range to join the Pacific in Waikawau Bay. Both rivers were officially named on 21 June 2019.

The New Zealand Ministry for Culture and Heritage gives a translation of "water of the shag" for Waikawau.

Waikawau River has 69% of its catchment in forest and scrub. Fish in the river include giant kōkopu, long and shortfin eels (tuna), giant bully (tītarakura), common bully (toitoi), redfin bully, torrentfish (panoko), smelt (pōrohe), īnanga, koura, trout and shrimp. Since 2006 work has been done to enhance 60 ha (150 acres) of wetlands and saltmarsh in the estuary, to increase bittern (matuku hūrepo), spotless crake (pūweto), banded rail (moho-pererū), fernbird (kōtātā) and pateke. 98 plant species have also been identified in the reserve, which is part of the 1,150 ha (2,800 acres) Waikawau Bay Farm Park. A campsite is at the eastern end of the bay, established in 1929.

== See also ==
- List of rivers of New Zealand
