= Slipper Lake =

Lake in New Zealand

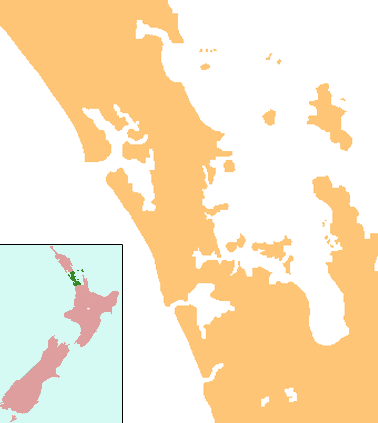
- Location within New Zealand Auckland
- Location: Auckland Region, North Island, New Zealand
- Coordinates: 36.17194°S 174.63055°E
- Primary inflows: Spectacle Lake
- Primary outflows: Unnamed stream flowing into the Jellicoe Channel
- Basin countries: New Zealand
- Max. length: 630 metres (2,070 ft)
- Max. width: 220 metres (720 ft)
- Surface area: 9 ha (22 acres)
- Max. depth: 5.3 metres (17 ft)

Slipper Lake is a lake at Te Ārai, Rodney in the northern Auckland Region of New Zealand.

== Geography ==
Slipper Lake is a sand dune lake located approximately 16 km (9.9 mi) northeast of the town of Wellsford. It covers an area of about 9 ha (22 acres). The lake is fed by an inlet that drains nearby Spectacle Lake. An unnamed stream flows from Slipper Lake into the Jellicoe Channel. The lake was created when the Te Ārai sand dunes began to build up, preventing water from escaping the area. The dune lakes are primarily fed by rainwater and the surrounding wetlands.

== Biodiversity ==
The lake is a part of the Tomarata — Te Ārai Dune Lakes biodiversity focus area.

== See also ==
- List of lakes of New Zealand
