= Port Jackson (disambiguation) =

Port Jackson is a harbour of Sydney, Australia.

Port Jackson may also refer to:

- Port Jackson, New Zealand, a small settlement on the Coromandel Peninsula's coast
- Port Jackson shark, a species of shark found in the coastal region of southern Australia, including the waters in the harbour of Sydney
- Port Jackson willow or Acacia saligna, a species of Acacia from Australia that has become an invasive weed in South Africa
- Ficus rubiginosa or "Port Jackson fig", of Australia
