= Gannett (disambiguation) =

Gannett is an American media holding company.

Gannett may also refer to:

== Geography ==
- Gannett Peak, mountain peak in Wyoming, United States
- Gannett, Idaho, community in Blaine County, Idaho
- Gannett Glacier, glacier in the Rocky Mountains within the United States

== People ==
- Gannett (surname), a surname

== Business ==
- Gannett Building, historic industrial and commercial building in Monroe County, New York, United States
- Gannett Digital, division of Gannett Company
- Guy Gannett Communications, a defunct media company headquartered in Maine, United States
- Tegna Inc., the company known as Gannett until 2015 that holds broadcasting and digital assets

== See also ==
- Gannet (disambiguation)
