= Hauraki Gulf =

Gulf in New Zealand

Hauraki Gulf / Tīkapa Moana
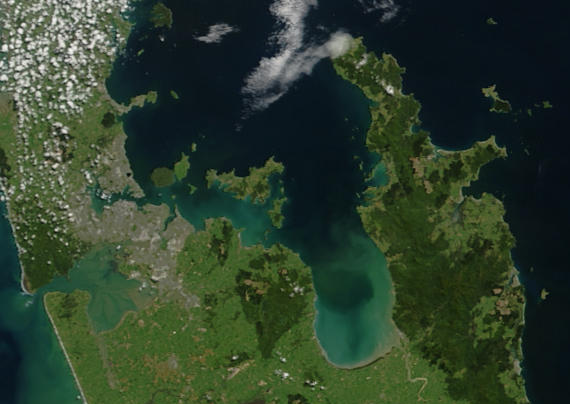
- True-colour image showing the Hauraki Gulf / Tīkapa Moana, with Auckland (left) and the Coromandel Peninsula (right), by NASA's Terra satellite, 2002.

- Location within New Zealand
- Interactive map of Hauraki Gulf / Tīkapa Moana
- Location: Upper North Island, New Zealand
- Coordinates: 36°20′S 175°05′E
- River sources: Tamaki River, Whau River, Wairoa River, Piako River, Waihou River, Waiau River, Mahurangi River
- Ocean/sea sources: Pacific Ocean
- Basin countries: New Zealand
- Max. length: 120 km (74.56 mi)
- Max. width: 60 km (37.28 mi)
- Surface area: 4,000 km^{2} (1,500 mi^{2})
- Islands: Great Barrier Island, Little Barrier Island, Waiheke Island, Rangitoto, Motutapu, Tiritiri Matangi Island, Ponui Island Motukorea / Browns Island, The Noises
- Sections/sub-basins: Firth of Thames, Tamaki Strait, Rangitoto Channel, Colville Channel, Cradock Channel, Waitematā Harbour
- Settlements: Auckland, Thames, Coromandel, Snells Beach, Orewa

The Hauraki Gulf (Māori: Tīkapa Moana) is a coastal feature of the North Island of New Zealand. It has an area of 4000 km^{2}, and lies between, in anticlockwise order, the Auckland Region, the Hauraki Plains, the Coromandel Peninsula, and Great Barrier Island. Most of the gulf is part of the Hauraki Gulf Marine Park.

Hauraki is Māori for north wind. In 2014, the gulf was officially named Hauraki Gulf / Tīkapa Moana. The New Zealand Ministry for Culture and Heritage gives a translation of "the mournful sea" for Tīkapa Moana. In traditional legend, the Hauraki Gulf is protected by a taniwha named Ureia, who takes the form of a whale.

== Geography ==
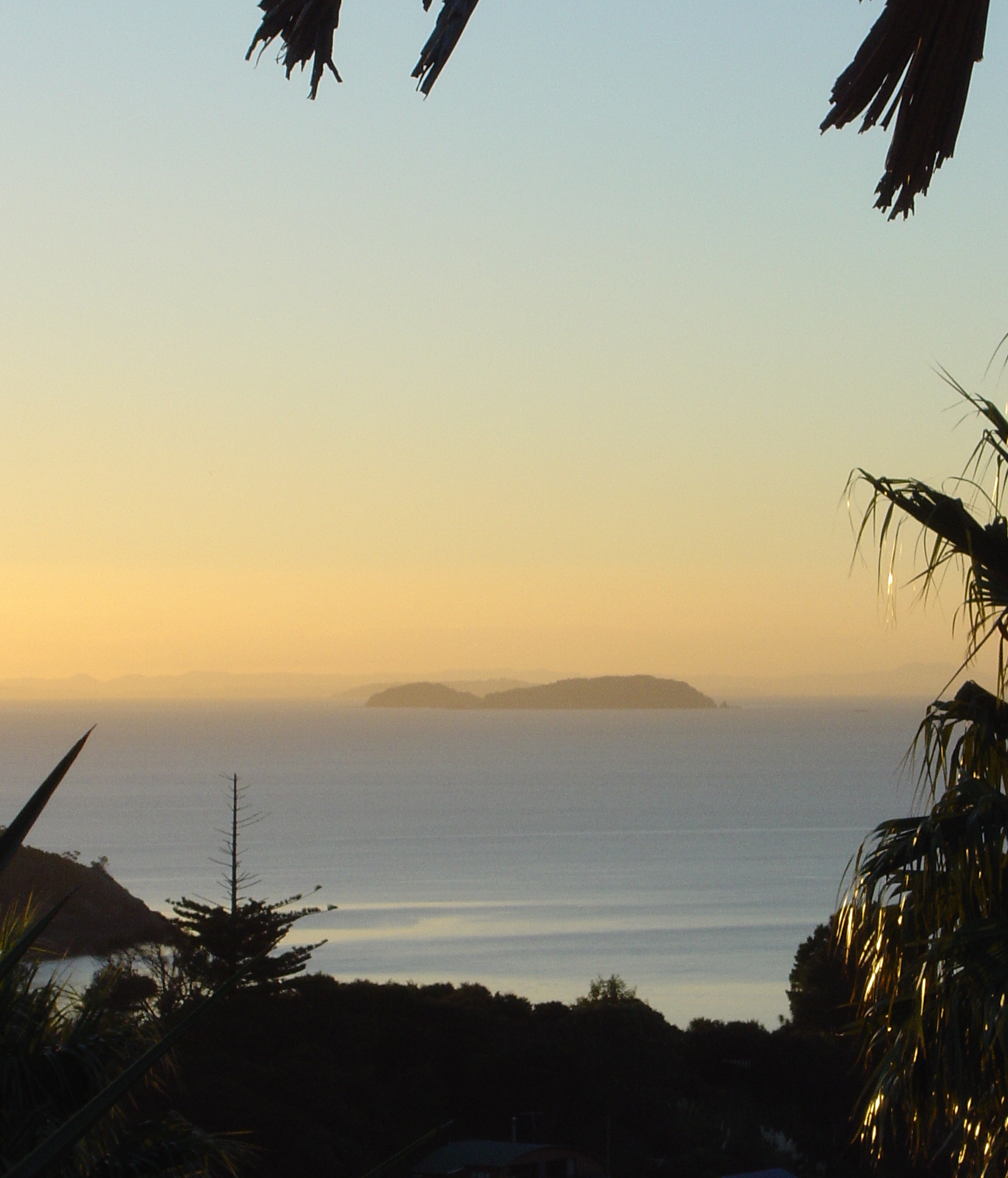
Sunset view of The Noises viewed from Waiheke Island

The gulf is part of the Pacific Ocean, which it joins to the north and east. It is largely protected from the Pacific by Great Barrier Island and Little Barrier Island to the north, and by the 80-kilometre-long Coromandel Peninsula to the east. It is thus well protected against all but northern winds.

Three large channels join the gulf to the Pacific. Colville Channel lies between the Coromandel Peninsula and Great Barrier, Cradock Channel lies between the two islands, and Jellicoe Channel lies between Little Barrier and the Northland Peninsula. To the north of Auckland several peninsulas jut into the gulf, notably the Whangaparāoa Peninsula. Tiritiri Matangi Island is near the end of this peninsula. Further north, Kawau Island nestles under the Tāwharanui Peninsula.

Numerous beaches dot the shores of the gulf, many of them well known for swimming and surfing.

During the last glaciation period the gulf was dry land, with the sea level being around 100–110 m (300 ft) lower than at present. The gulf was submerged when the sea reached its current level around 7200 years ago. During this period, the area was home to two river systems. The first of these was a river formed by two tributaries, the Mahurangi River and Waitematā Harbour (then a river). This river flowed north-east between modern day Little Barrier Island and Great Barrier Island, and emptied into the Pacific Ocean north of Great Barrier Island. The second was a stream formed by the major Hauraki Plains rivers: the Waihou River, Piako River and Waitakaruru River. Prior to the Ōruanui eruption 27,000 years ago, the Waikato River also flowed into the Hauraki Gulf at the Firth of Thames. The Hauraki Plains rivers were met by two tributaries, the Wairoa River to the west from modern-day Clevedon and the Umangawha Stream to the east, at Colville, Coromandel Peninsula. This river flowed north, along the plains, turning east and exiting towards the Pacific Ocean along the modern-day Colville Channel between the Coromandel Peninsula and Great Barrier Island.

=== Islands ===
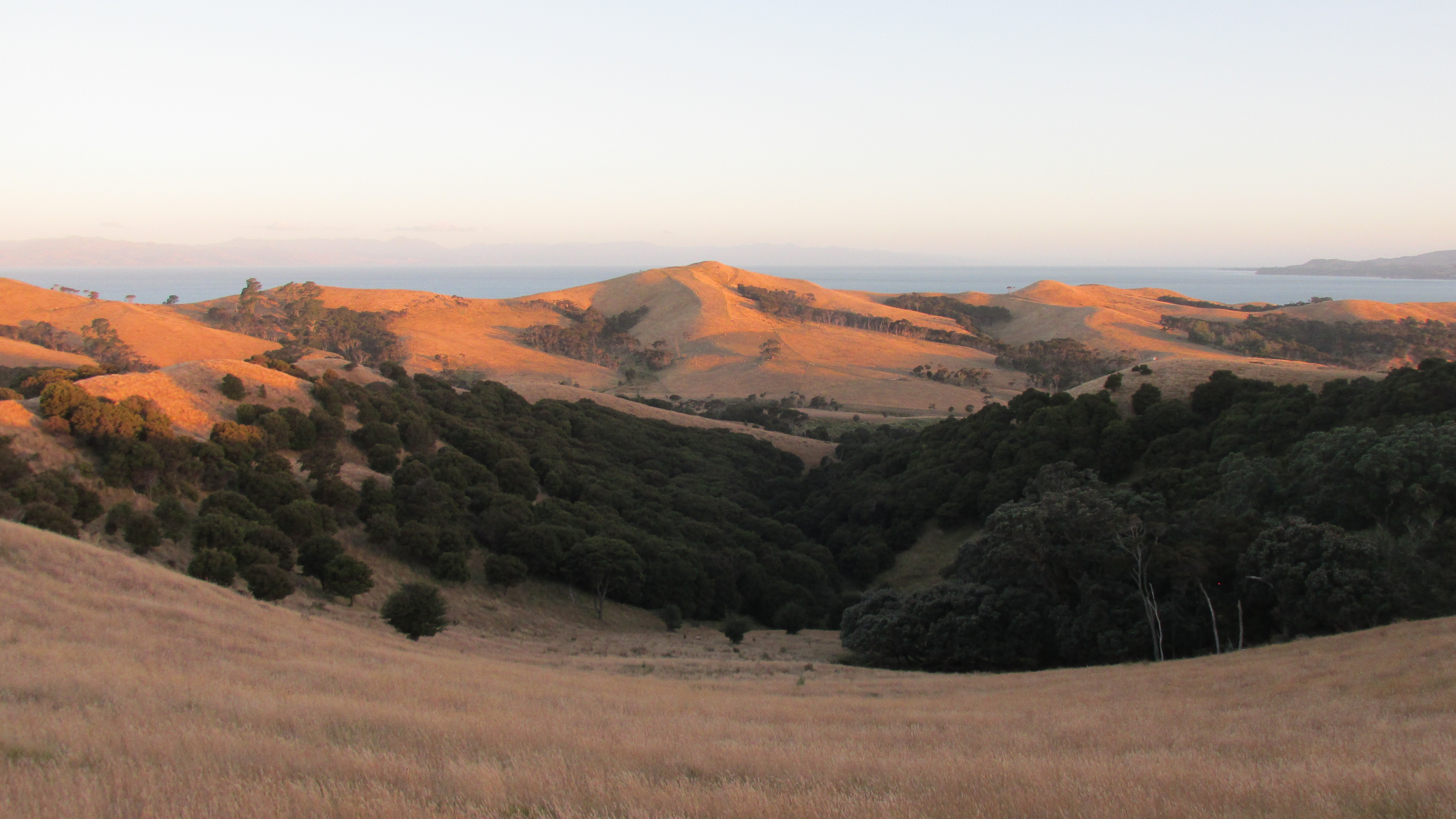
Farmland and native bush on Ponui Island

In the west of the gulf lie a string of islands guarding the mouth of the Waitematā Harbour, one of Auckland's two harbours. These include Ponui Island, Waiheke Island, Tiritiri Matangi and the iconic dome of Rangitoto Island (a dormant volcano), which is connected to the much older Motutapu Island by a causeway. The islands are separated from the mainland by the Tāmaki Strait and Rangitoto Channel.

Other islands in the gulf include Browns Island, Motuihe Island, Pakihi Island, Pakatoa Island, Rākino Island, and Rotoroa Island in the inner gulf, around Waiheke and Rangitoto; Tarahiki Island just east of Waiheke; Motukawao Islands and Whanganui Island in the lee of the Coromandel Peninsula; and Channel Island in the outer gulf.

In March 2020, a small excavation was carried out in a large coastal midden on Ōtata Island. In January 2018, huge swells in the Hauraki Gulf caused widespread damage to its coastal areas and in only a few hours, the coastline of Ōtata had been reduced by up to 5 meters, exposing the midden. The aim of the excavation was to record this information before it is lost to erosion and was carried out in partnership with Ngāi Tai ki Tāmaki, the landowners. An understanding the changing marine environment around the island will also form part of the work.

=== Firth of Thames ===
At the southern end of the gulf is the wide, relatively shallow Firth of Thames. Beyond this lie the Hauraki Plains, drained by the Waihou River and the Piako River. The Hunua Ranges and hills of the Coromandel Peninsula rise on either side of the Firth.

== History ==
Traditional Tāmaki Māori histories describe the naming of the gulf. The migratory canoes Tainui and Arawa left Raʻiātea at similar times, and both explored the Bay of Plenty area. The crew of both canoes met at Horuhoru Rock (Gannet Rock), where a ceremony was held in memory for the relatives they had lost on the journey. During the ceremony, a mauri stone brought with them on their voyage named Tīkapa was placed on the island. The name Tīkapa Moana was adopted for the surrounding ocean, and became the name of the gulf.

An early visitor to the coast near the Thames was the 150-ton brig Fancy, under the command of Captain Thomas Dell, in December 1795. After three months in the area, the vessel returned to Sydney on 15 March 1795 with a cargo of flax and 200 spars.

== Ecology ==
=== Species ===
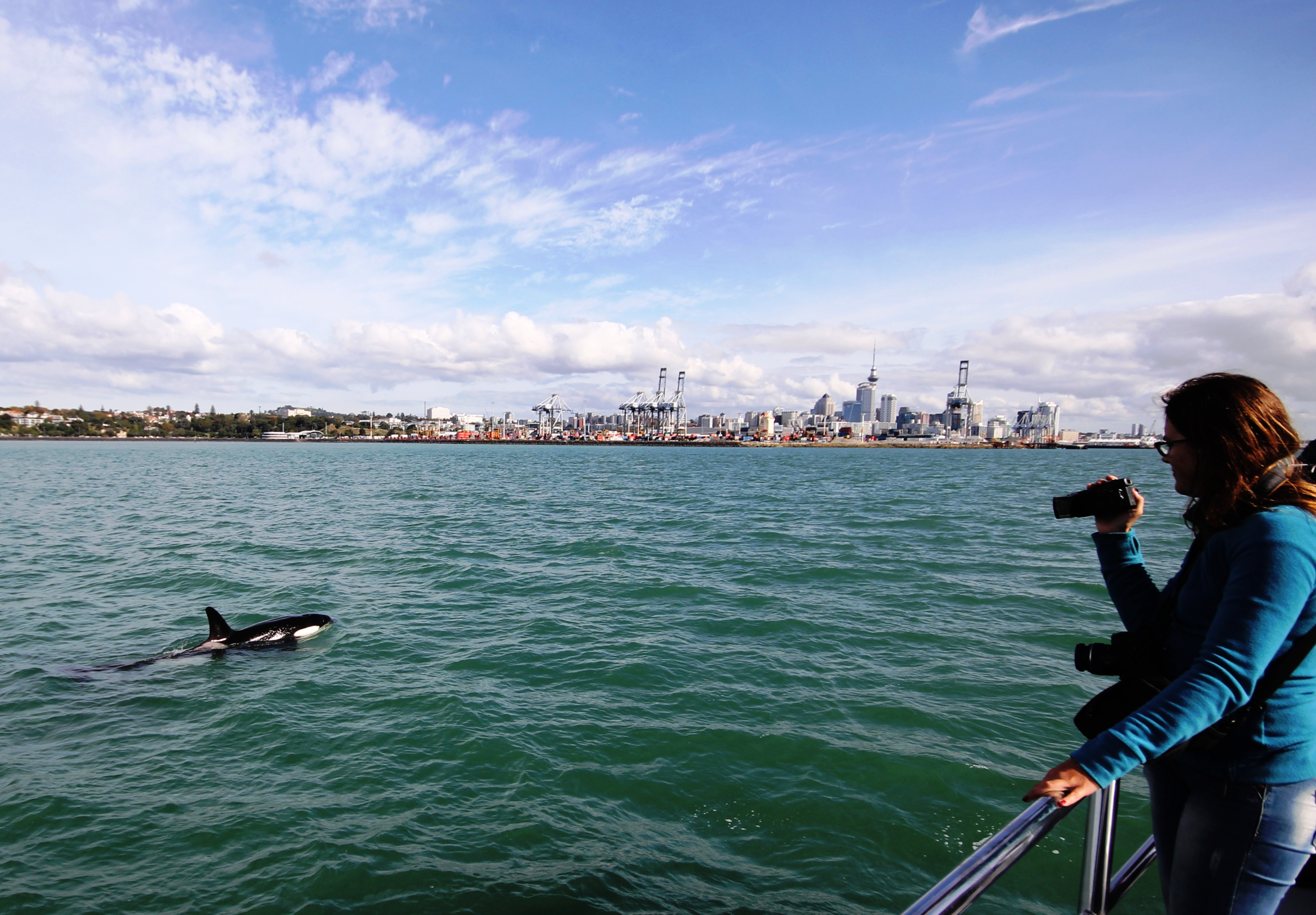
An orca swims in Waitematā Harbour, with Auckland CBD in the background.

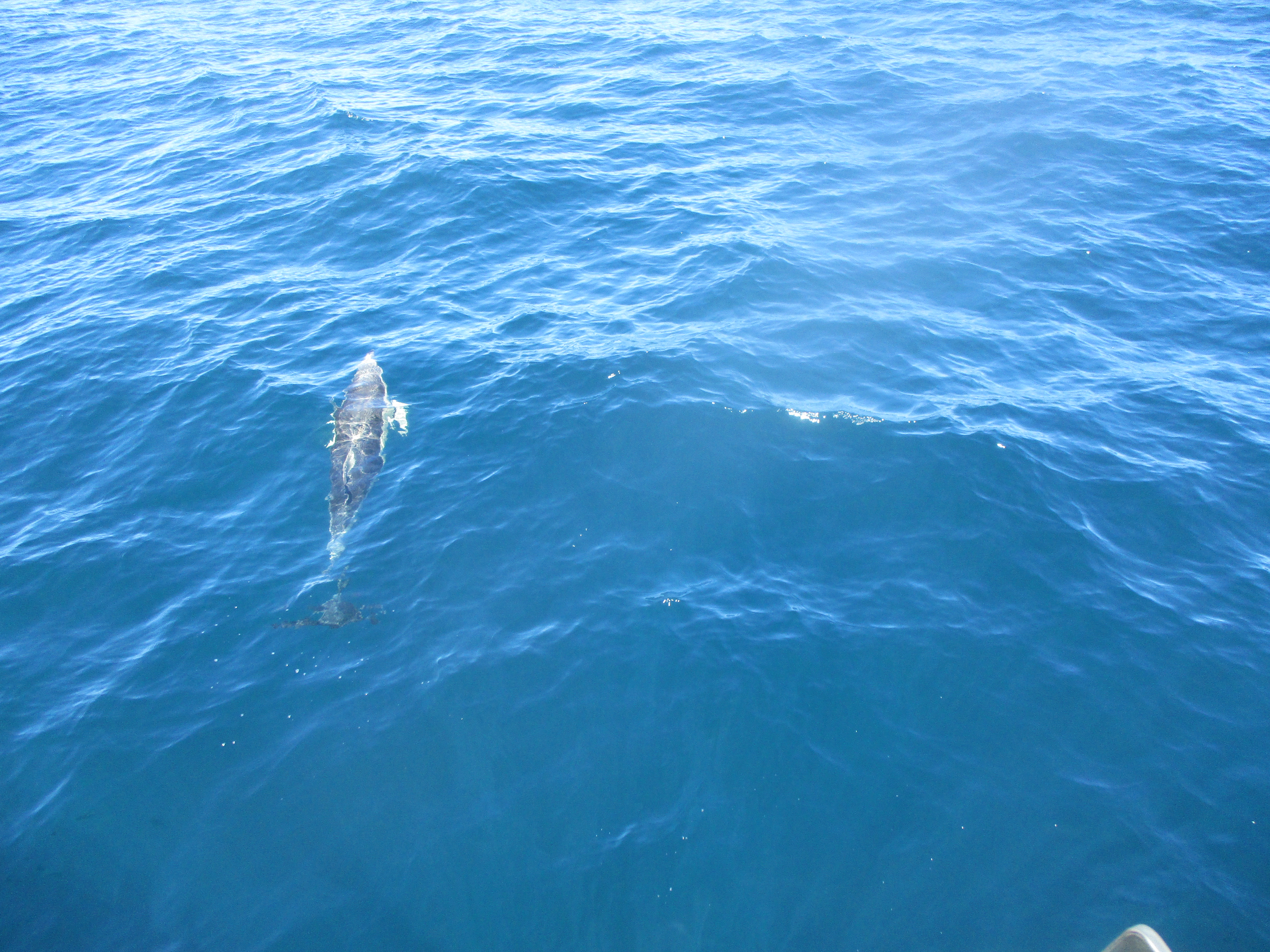
Dolphins in the Hauraki Gulf

Some particular common or known animals include bottlenose and common dolphins, the latter sometimes seen in "super schools" of 300-500 animals or more, while various species of whales and orcas are a relatively common sight. There are approximately 25 species of marine mammals in the gulf. Nearly a third of the world's marine mammal species live in or visit the Marine Park.

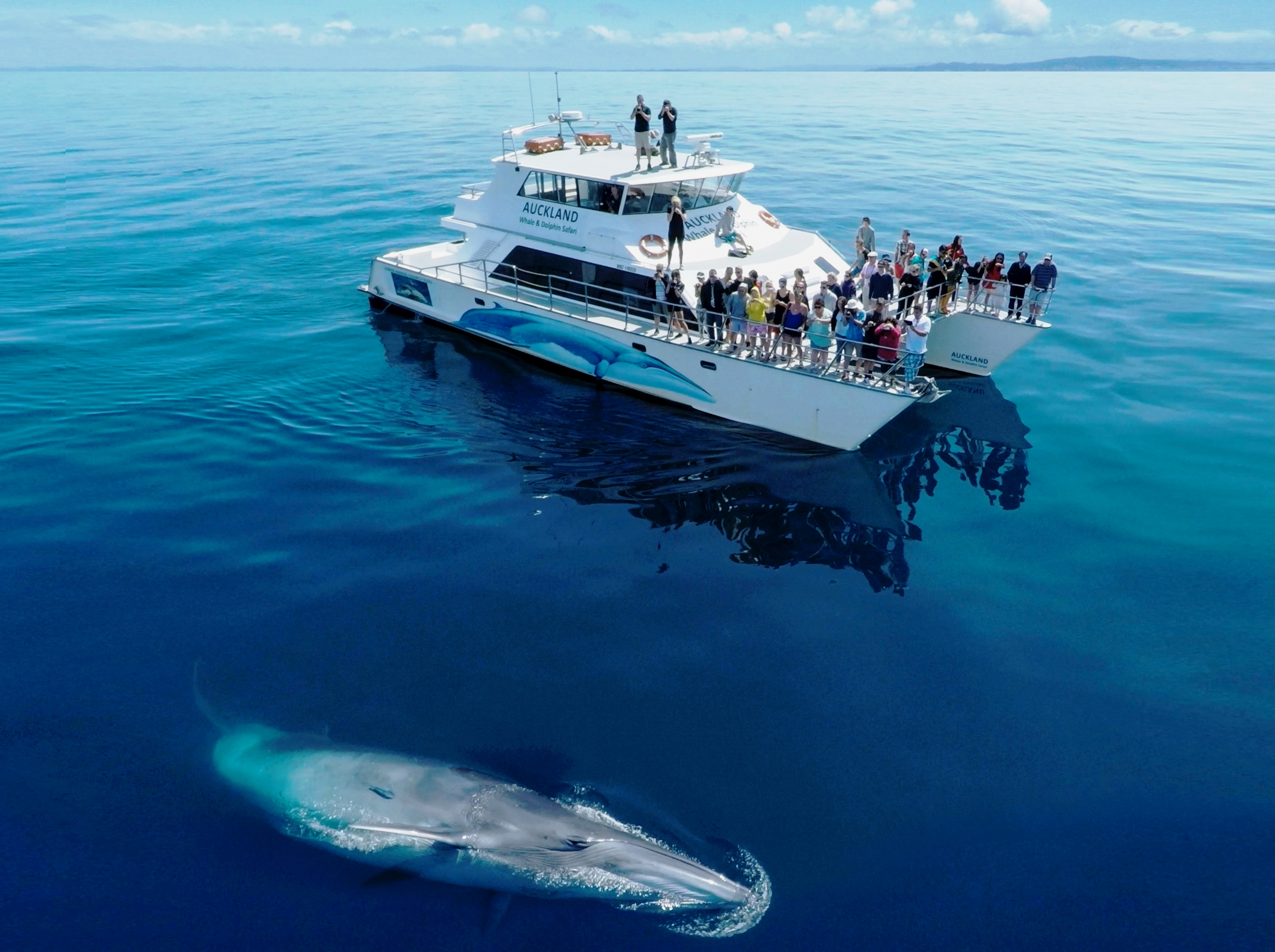
A Bryde's whale with a watching vessel.

Among larger cetaceans, Bryde's whales are residents and relatively common in the Gulf, and their presence in these busily travelled waters leads to a large number of ship strikes, with sometimes several of the whales dying each year from collisions with shipping vessels or sport boats. The population remaining is estimated to be between 100-200. In recent years, increases in numbers of migrating baleen whales are confirmed long after the end of hunting era. These are humpback whales, southern blue whales, pygmy blue whales, and southern minke whales. Less frequently, fin whales and sei whales are seen as well. For southern right whales, these whales will possibly become seasonal residents in the gulf as the populations recover (one of two of the first confirmed birth records on New Zealand's main islands since after commercial and illegal whalings were recorded at around Milford and Browns Bay in 2012). Sperm whales visit occasionally.

Many of the islands are official or unofficial bird sanctuaries, holding important or critically endangered species like kiwi, takahē, brown teal and grey-faced petrel. Centred on the main conservation island of Tiritiri Matangi and Little Barrier Island, numerous bird species that were locally extinct have been reintroduced in the last decades, while there have also been some naturally occurring bird "re-colonisations", especially after introduced pests were removed from breeding and nesting grounds.

=== Environmental damage ===
The gulf is a vibrant natural environment, which has seen significant damage during the 20th and early 21st century from human use. Although major study by the Hauraki Gulf Forum in 2011 found that all environmental indicators were still worsening or stable at problematic levels, voluntary coast clean-up groups have collected about 450,000 litres of litter from the shoreline, although further conservation efforts are required to maintain the environmental integrity of the gulf.

Particularly damaging were the introduction of industrialised fishing, with for example snapper fishing peaking in the 1970s at more than 10,000 tonnes a year (though even in the 2000s, private fishing of this species is also a considerable factor, weighing in at 400–800 tonnes a year). This severe overfishing, which unbalanced the marine environment by the removal of a main predator in the food chain, led to further degradation, such as a widespread disappearance of kelp beds as they were overtaken by kina barrens. Trawler fishing in general is seen as severely damaging the gulf, and lobster stock are also reported as not rebuilding. It is estimated that today's fish stocks are around 25% of pre-European levels.

Also particularly damaging are the results of nitrogen carried into the gulf from surrounding agricultural land, with almost 90% coming from the dairy-farming runoff into the Firth of Thames.

Other exploitation such as the dredging of the mussel beds of the Firth of Thames, reaching its height in 1961 with an estimated 15 million mussels taken (shortly before collapse of the industry) have led to damage which has not been recovered from forty years later, possibly due to the dredging having destroyed the seafloor, and sediment drainage from the agriculture in the Firth of Thames affecting the mussel's viability.

Numerous beaches dot the shores of the gulf, many of them well known for swimming and surfing. Although environmental problems exist around urban areas, with 14 out of 52 beaches in the Auckland Region at least occasionally showing unsafe pollution levels (mostly because of untreated sewage) for bathing, environmental groups are working to clean the beaches and restore their vitality.

== Marine Park ==
The Hauraki Gulf was declared a marine park in 2000 by legislative statute. This was accompanied by the formation of the Hauraki Gulf Forum, whose membership includes representatives of local iwi and local authorities in the area surrounding the Hauraki Gulf. The park is distinctly different from other conservation areas of New Zealand not only by being a marine environment, but because it is home to more than one million people along its shores and on its islands. It also contains a number of (above-water) wildlife sanctuaries.

== Campaigns ==
LegaSea, a non-profit environmental organisation based in New Zealand, is involved in campaigns to restrict destructive fishing methods in the Hauraki Gulf Marine Park, stretching from Te Ārai, Bream Bay to Waihi Beach, opposing fishing methods such as bottom trawling, Danish seining, and scallop dredging. In 2022, LegaSea established the Hauraki Gulf Alliance, a coalition of environmental organisations and community groups advocating the removal of these practices from the Hauraki Gulf.
