= Tomarata =

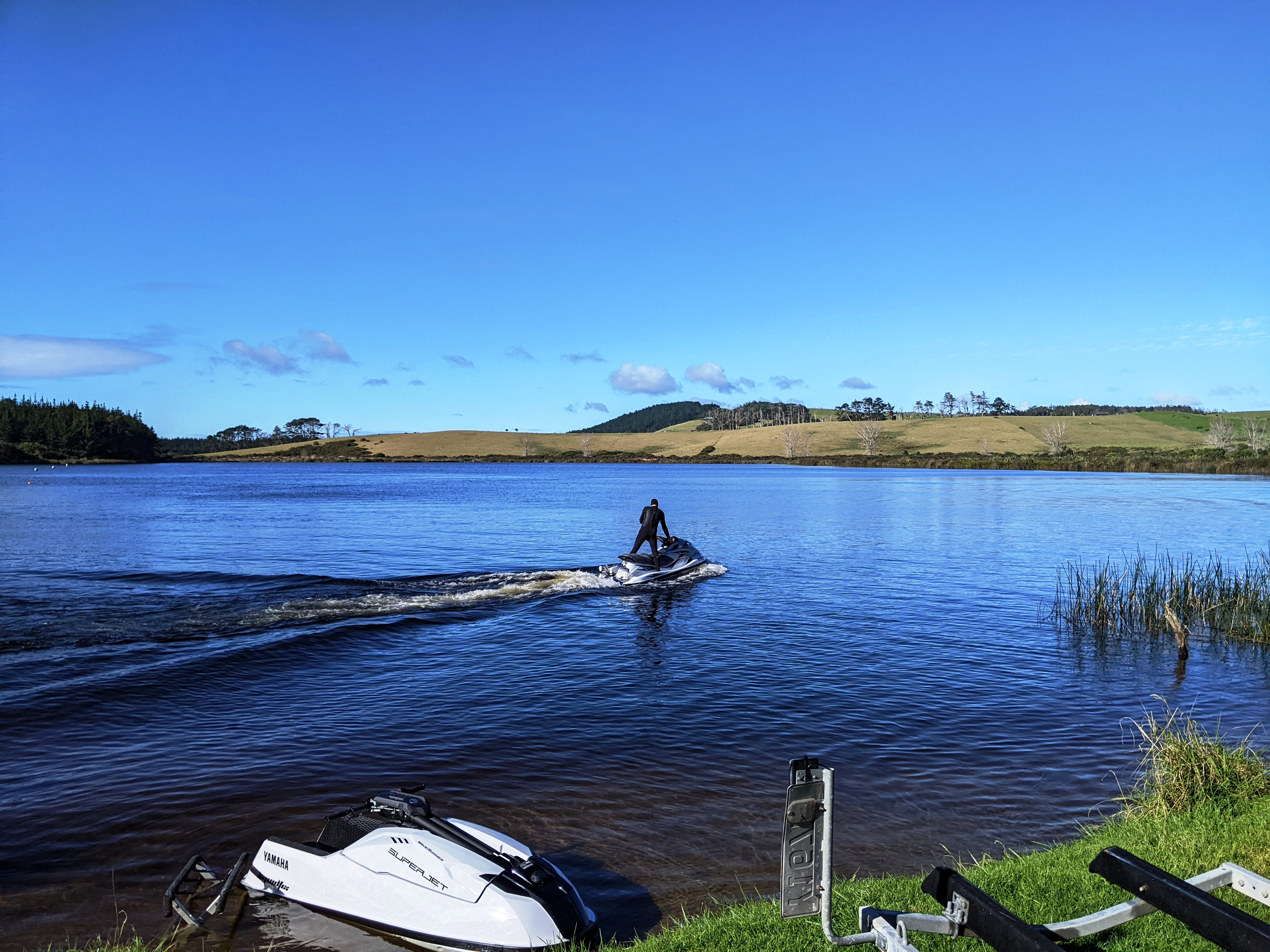
- Jetski on Tomarata Lake
- Interactive map of Tomarata
- Coordinates: 36°13′54″S 174°37′57″E
- Country: New Zealand
- Region: Auckland Region
- Ward: Rodney ward
- Community board: Rodney Local Board
- Subdivision: Wellsford subdivision

Government
  - Territorial Authority: Auckland Council

Tomarata is a locality in the Auckland Region of New Zealand. Wellsford lies to the south-west, Te Ārai to the north, and Pākiri to the south-east. Tomarata Lake is nearby and is popular for boating, water skiing, kayaking and swimming. It is also used as a place to picnic and has a trail that follows the edge of the lake for hiking.

== History ==
Tomarata Lake was created around 12,000 years ago by the formation of sand dunes along the coast that prevented water from running out to sea. Thus, no rivers or streams flow into these lakes; their water comes from rainfall and water that seeps through the sand.

Tomarata was a location for the late 19th/early 20th century kauri gum digging trade.

== Education ==
Tomarata School is a coeducational full primary (years 1–8) school with a roll of 96 students as of July 2026.
