= Little Barrier Island =

Island in the Hauraki Gulf, New Zealand

Māori: Te Hauturu-o-Toi Nickname: Hauturu
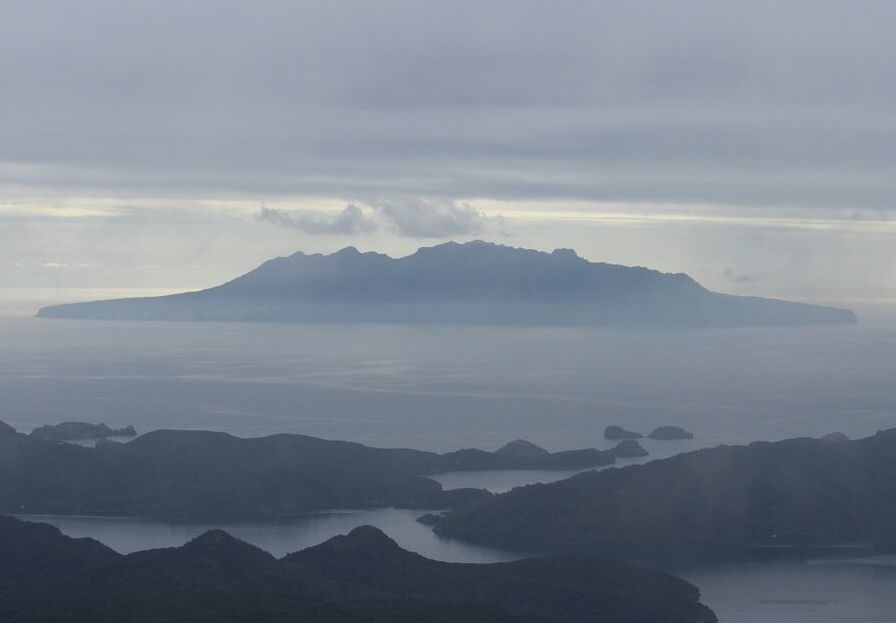
- View of Little Barrier Island from Great Barrier Island

- Location within New Zealand

Geography
- Location: Hauraki Gulf, Auckland Region
- Coordinates: 36°11′57″S 175°04′53″E
- Area: 28.17 km^{2} (10.88 sq mi)
- Length: 7.5 km (4.66 mi)
- Width: 5.5 km (3.42 mi)
- Highest elevation: 722 m (2369 ft)
- Highest point: Mount Hauturu

Administration
- New Zealand

Demographics
- Population: No permanent inhabitants

Additional information
- Wildlife sanctuary

Little Barrier Island, or Hauturu in Māori (the official Māori title is Te Hauturu-o-Toi), lies off the northeastern coast of New Zealand's North Island. Located 80 kilometres (50 mi) to the north of Auckland, the island is separated from the mainland to the west by the Jellicoe Channel, and from the larger Great Barrier Island to the east by the Cradock Channel. The two aptly named islands shelter the Hauraki Gulf from many of the storms of the Pacific Ocean.

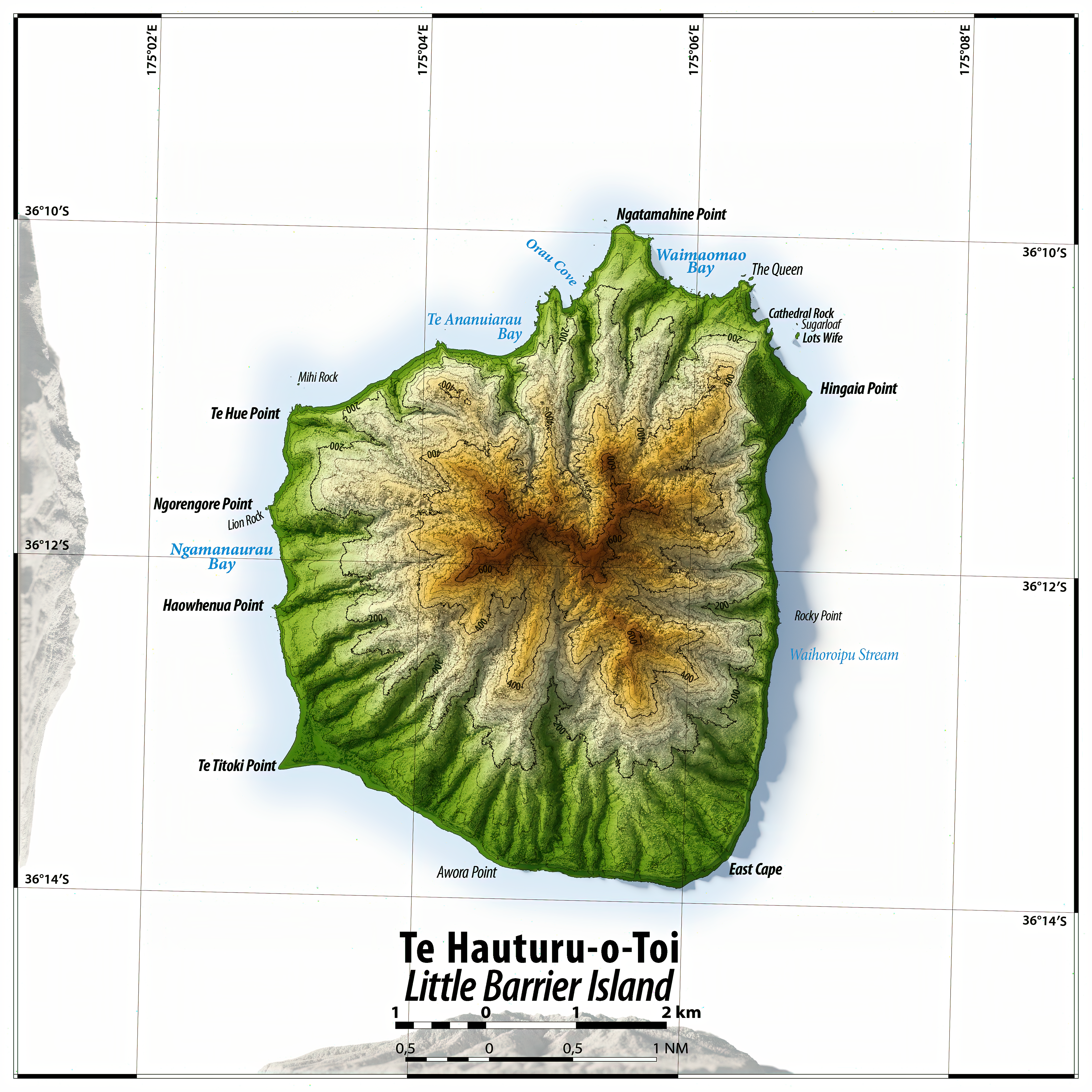
Topographic map of Little Barrier Island

Settled by the Māori between 1350 and 1650, the island was occupied by them until the New Zealand government declared the island a wildlife sanctuary in 1897. Since the island came under control of the government, it has been under limited access, with only a few rangers living on the island. The Māori name of the island means "the resting place of lingering breezes". Along with its larger neighbour Great Barrier, it was given its English name by Captain James Cook in 1769.

The island is a nature sanctuary which has been described by the MBIE as "the most intact [native] ecosystem in New Zealand". However, several invasive species were introduced by both Maori and European settlers, including cats, which were destructive to local small bird and reptile species until they were eradicated between July 1977 and June 1980 in what was possibly New Zealand's costliest pest control programme. This was followed by a rat eradication programme from 2004. A cost benefit analysis has been published.

== History ==
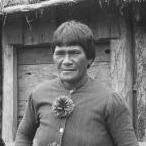
Rāhui Te Kiri, one who authorities evicted from the island in 1896

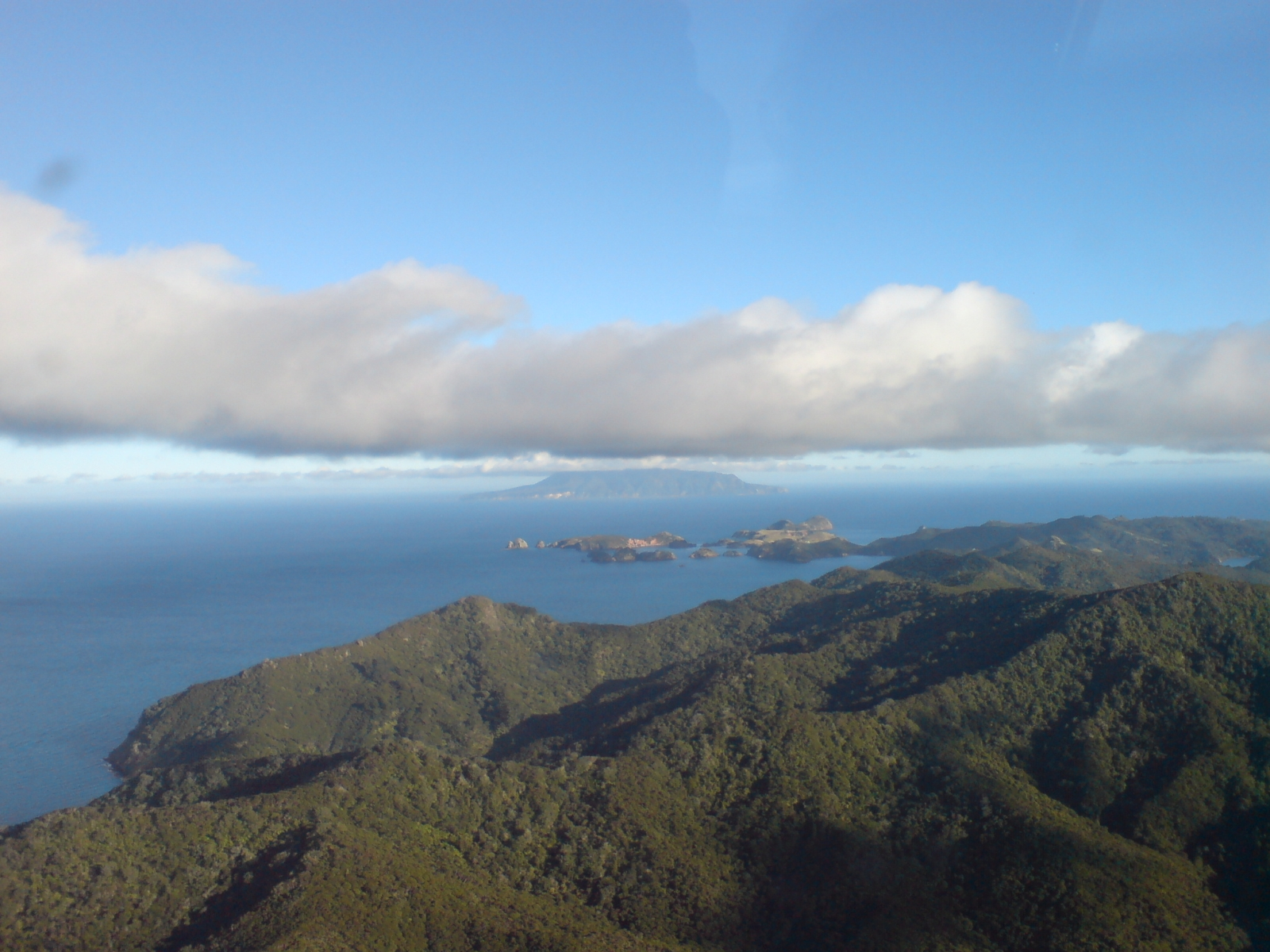
The island (in the distance) from over Great Barrier Island

Māori occupied the island for centuries prior to the first European visits, probably first settling there between 1350 and 1650 CE. The initial occupation was by descendants of Toi te Huatahi, followed by Tainui, who were then conquered by Ngāti Wai. By 1881 only a few Ngāti Wai were still living there and the British Crown attempted to buy the island in order to turn it into a nature reserve. After the purchase fell through, the island was instead appropriated through an Act of Parliament in 1894 and became New Zealand's first nature reserve the following year. The Ngāti Wai still on the island, including the chiefs Wiremu Te Heru Tenetahi and Rāhui Te Kiri and their family, and a few Europeans living on the island, were forcibly removed from the island by a group of officials, police and soldiers in 1896. Since 1897, there has always been a caretaker or ranger resident on the island. In 2011 the Crown settled treaty claims with local iwi, and the island was returned to iwi, who in turn gifted it back to the people of New Zealand.

Access is heavily restricted for conservation reasons, and the island is uninhabited except for rotational conservation staff, scientists and rangers under the authority of the Department of Conservation. Electricity for their needs was provided by a diesel generator linked to a battery bank until 2005, and has since been replaced by twenty 175-watt solar panels, with the generator remaining solely for backup. Over the expected 20-year life-span, the new system is expected to generate fuel savings sufficient to replace its purchase costs.

=== Stonework ===
Māori stonework has been found at fourteen locations on the island, primarily around the coastal flats at Te Titoki Point. Man-made cuttings, which were described in 1895 as ruts for hauling canoes, can be seen on the boulder beach ridge at Te Titoki Point. There are also stone rows measuring up to 60 metres (200 ft) long, 2 metres (6 ft 7 in) wide and 0.5 metres (1 ft 8 in) high, located near the mouth of Te Waikohare Stream.

Stone rows and heaps can be found 200 metres (660 ft) to 500 metres (1,600 ft) from the mouths of Te Waikohare and Tirikawa Streams. The largest is 2 metres (6 ft 7 in) high and 4 metres (13 ft) wide. The most extensive stonework is located in the northwest of the island, near the ridge south of Te Hue Stream, where it is spread over several hectares. This site includes a number of terraces, which are stone-faced or have stone retaining walls. There are also numerous stone heaps and rows, and several free standing stone walls.

Stonework in the northeast of the island is more weathered than in other areas and partially buried. Because of this weathering these features are thought to be older than at the other sites.

== Geography ==
Map centered on Little Barrier with surface volcanics such as andesite in red shading and dacite in purple shading. Clicking on the map enlarges it, and enables panning and mouseover of volcanic feature name/wikilink and ages before present. The key to the other volcanics that are shown with panning is basalt - brown, monogenetic basalts - dark brown, undifferentiated basalts of the Tangihua Complex in Northland Allochthon - light brown, arc basalts - deep orange brown, arc ring basalts - orange brown, rhyolite - violet, basaltic andesite - light red, ignimbrite (lighter shades of violet), and plutonic - gray.

The island is an extinct andesitic stratovolcano, roughly circular in shape, about 6 km (3.7 mi) across, with an area of 28 km^{2} (11 sq mi). Its earliest volcanic activity is estimated to have occurred 3 million years ago and the latest 1.2 million years ago. The volcano is most closely related to two volcanoes over 120 km (75 mi) northwest, near Whangārei. The volcanic activity on the island is associated with the Coromandel Volcanic Zone, which later moved southwards to form the modern Taupō Volcanic Zone. The island was one of the final volcanic events in the zone, as most volcanism in the zone occurred between 18 and 4 million years ago.

The island is steeply sloping, and deeply dissected by ravines radiating from a central range that peaks at Mount Hauturu, whose altitude is 722 m (2,369 ft). Te Titoki Point is the only area of flat land on the island.

Approximately 18,000 years ago during the Last Glacial Maximum when sea levels were over 100 metres lower than present day levels, Little Barrier Island was landlocked to the North Island, surrounded by a vast coastal plain where the Hauraki Gulf / Tīkapa Moana exists today. Sea levels began to rise 7,000 years ago, after which Little Barrier became an island separated from the rest of New Zealand. During the glacial period, a river formed by the Mahurangi River and Waitematā Harbour river flowed between Little Barrier Island and Great Barrier Island.

== Environment ==
A dense forest cover shelters numerous rare or endangered animal species. The total number of species of native plants is thought to range around 400, and the island may shelter more endangered birds than any other island in New Zealand. The island has been identified as an Important Bird Area by BirdLife International because it is a nesting site for vulnerable Cook's and Parkinson's petrels. In February 2013, there were reports of the critically endangered New Zealand storm petrel (Oceanites maorianus) breeding on the island.

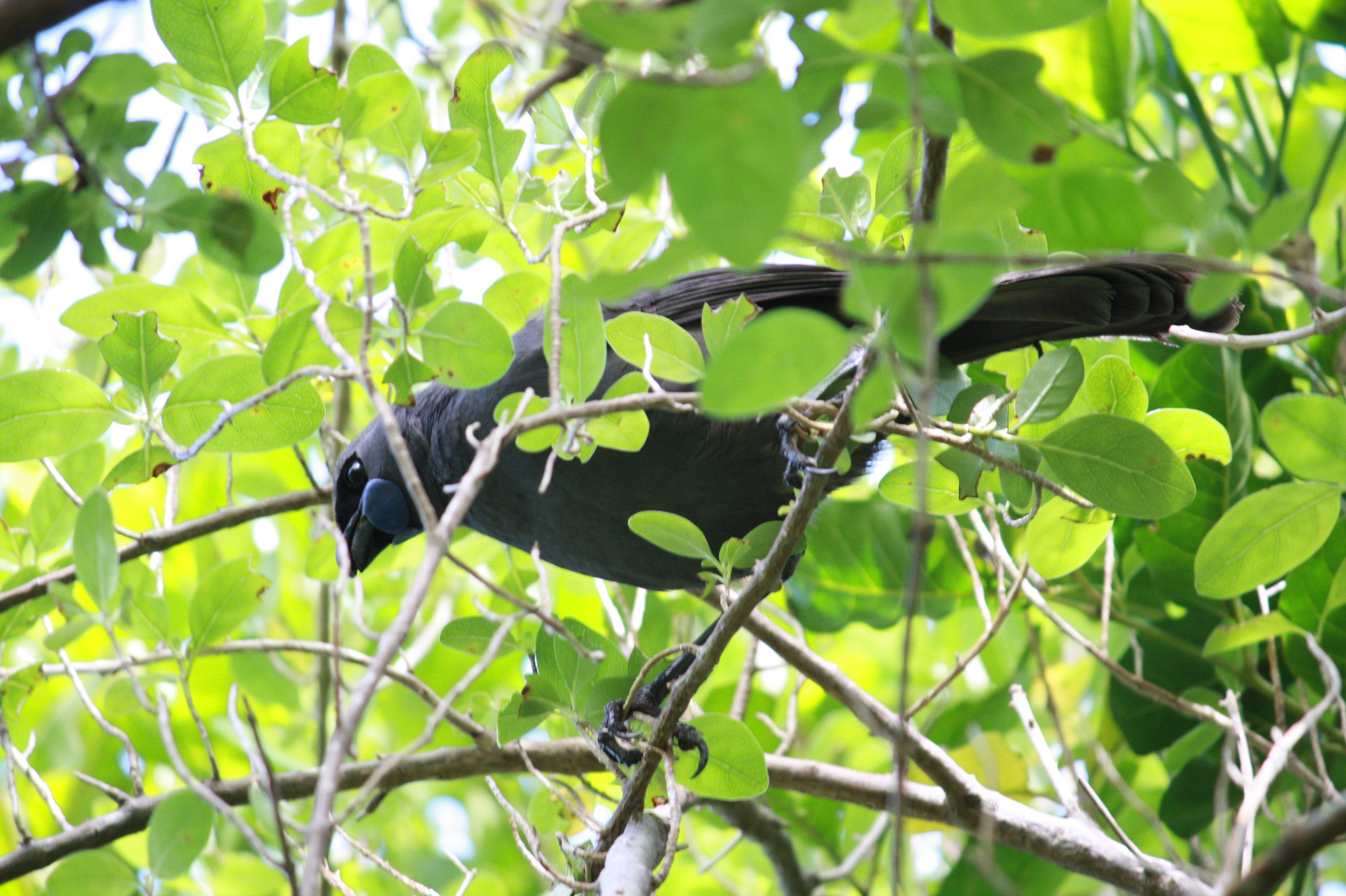
A North Island kōkako feeding in a coprosma tree on Little Barrier Island

When Māori occupied the island, as much as a third of the island was cleared of forest. However, since the acquisition of the land by the New Zealand government, all but 20 hectares of the island have been reforested.

=== Native species ===
Bryde's whales, orcas and bottlenose dolphins live in the waters around the island. Blue whales and southern right whales rest in this area during migration. In 2012, there were reports that a southern right whale may have calved near the island.

The island was, until recently, the last refuge for two species: the stitchbird and the wētāpunga. By 1883, the stitchbird was confined to Little Barrier Island due to introduced species and deforestation on the mainland. Thanks to the actions of Department of Conservation, the species has been reintroduced to several other offshore islands as well as some mainland sanctuaries that have predator-proof fences, such as the Bushy Park forest reserve. The wētāpunga, on the other hand, has been confined to this island since its extinction in the Northland and Auckland regions sometime in the 19th century. The last population continued to decline until the removal of kiore in 2004. Since then, the population has made a rapid recovery, and the species has been reintroduced to numerous predator-free places and islands as well.

North Island brown kiwi (Apteryx mantelli) live on Little Barrier Island. They were reported from there over a number of decades in the 19th century, but with no tangible evidence for a long time. Then, the naturalist Andreas Reischek collected an Apteryx mantelli there in 1882. Many years later, examination of the feathers of the specimen, which was held in the Natural History Museum, Vienna, yielded the louse Rallicola rodericki, which is known only from Apteryx mantelli living on Little Barrier Island, providing supporting evidence for the provenance of that specimen kiwi. The island's native population was supplemented with additional Apteryx mantelli that were transferred from the North Island in the early 20th century.

There are several invertebrate species that are only known from this island, namely the ground beetle Mecodema haunoho and the spiders Migas insularis and Stanwellia hapua.

Kākāpō (night parrots), also critically endangered, were first translocated to the island in 1982. They successfully bred there in the 1980s and 1990s with the support of supplementary food. They were all removed in 1999 so that kiore (Polynesian rats) could be eradicated from the island using poison bait. They were reintroduced in 2012; as of July 2017, their population on the island stood at 14. Hauturu is a test site to see if the kākāpō can breed and raise their young successfully without human intervention.

=== Invasive species ===
The Polynesian rat or kiore (Rattus exulans) was likely introduced as invasive species during the initial settlement of the island by Māori. Rat eradication took place by aerial-dropped poison baits in 2004.

Feral cats arrived on the island in the early 1870s. As in other places where predatory species were introduced, small animals not accustomed to predation likely experienced a decline in population, being pushed towards endangerment or extinction. In a survey of studies about eradicating the cats, scientist C.R. ("Dick") Veitch mentions several small species that were likely affected by the cats, including small reptiles and birds, such as the North Island snipe (Coenocorypha barrierensis), which only survived into the European era on this island and was formerly distributed across the entirety of the North Island, North Island saddleback (Philesturnus rufusater), grey-faced petrel (Pterodroma macroptera gouldi), Cook's petrel (Pterodroma cookii) and black petrel (Proeellaria parkinsoni). Cat eradication was completed by a dedicated team from July 1977 to 23 June 1980, with 151 cats known killed using traps and poison.

Introduced wasps such as German, common, Asian paper, and Tasmanian paper wasps may be present on the island. In terms of established populations of introduced wasps, a survey reported in 2020 no Vespula species (common and German wasps) but Polistes species (Asian paper and Tasmanian wasps) were present. German wasps had been reported on the island by the 1980s. A potential relationship between rat eradication and decline in Vespula species has been reported, but no such link was found in later work.

Prior to 1995, very little attention was paid to weed species on the island. The rangers' garden had been planted in exotics, and bird and wind dispersed colonising species that spread rapidly. In 1996 a weed control programme, based on the successful work on the Kermadecs, was implemented with teams of weeders grid-searching the island. The main target species were climbing asparagus, the Mexican devil, and the mist flower.

== Climate ==
Climate data for Little Barrier Island (1991–2020)
Month	Jan	Feb	Mar	Apr	May	Jun	Jul	Aug	Sep	Oct	Nov	Dec	Year
Mean daily maximum °C (°F)	23.1 (73.6)	24.0 (75.2)	22.6 (72.7)	20.0 (68.0)	18.2 (64.8)	15.9 (60.6)	15.1 (59.2)	15.3 (59.5)	16.6 (61.9)	17.9 (64.2)	19.3 (66.7)	21.8 (71.2)	19.2 (66.5)
Daily mean °C (°F)	19.7 (67.5)	20.3 (68.5)	19.2 (66.6)	17.2 (63.0)	15.4 (59.7)	13.1 (55.6)	12.5 (54.5)	12.4 (54.3)	13.5 (56.3)	14.7 (58.5)	16.0 (60.8)	18.3 (64.9)	16.0 (60.9)
Mean daily minimum °C (°F)	16.2 (61.2)	16.6 (61.9)	15.8 (60.4)	14.4 (57.9)	12.6 (54.7)	10.3 (50.5)	9.8 (49.6)	9.5 (49.1)	10.3 (50.5)	11.4 (52.5)	12.7 (54.9)	14.8 (58.6)	12.9 (55.2)
Average rainfall mm (inches)	101.3 (3.99)	70.7 (2.78)	111.5 (4.39)	88.7 (3.49)	90.4 (3.56)	126.1 (4.96)	107.2 (4.22)	155.6 (6.13)	107.9 (4.25)	82.2 (3.24)	83.9 (3.30)	82.9 (3.26)	1,208.4 (47.57)
Source: NIWA

== See also ==
- List of volcanoes in New Zealand
- List of islands of New Zealand
