= Colville Channel =

Channel in New Zealand

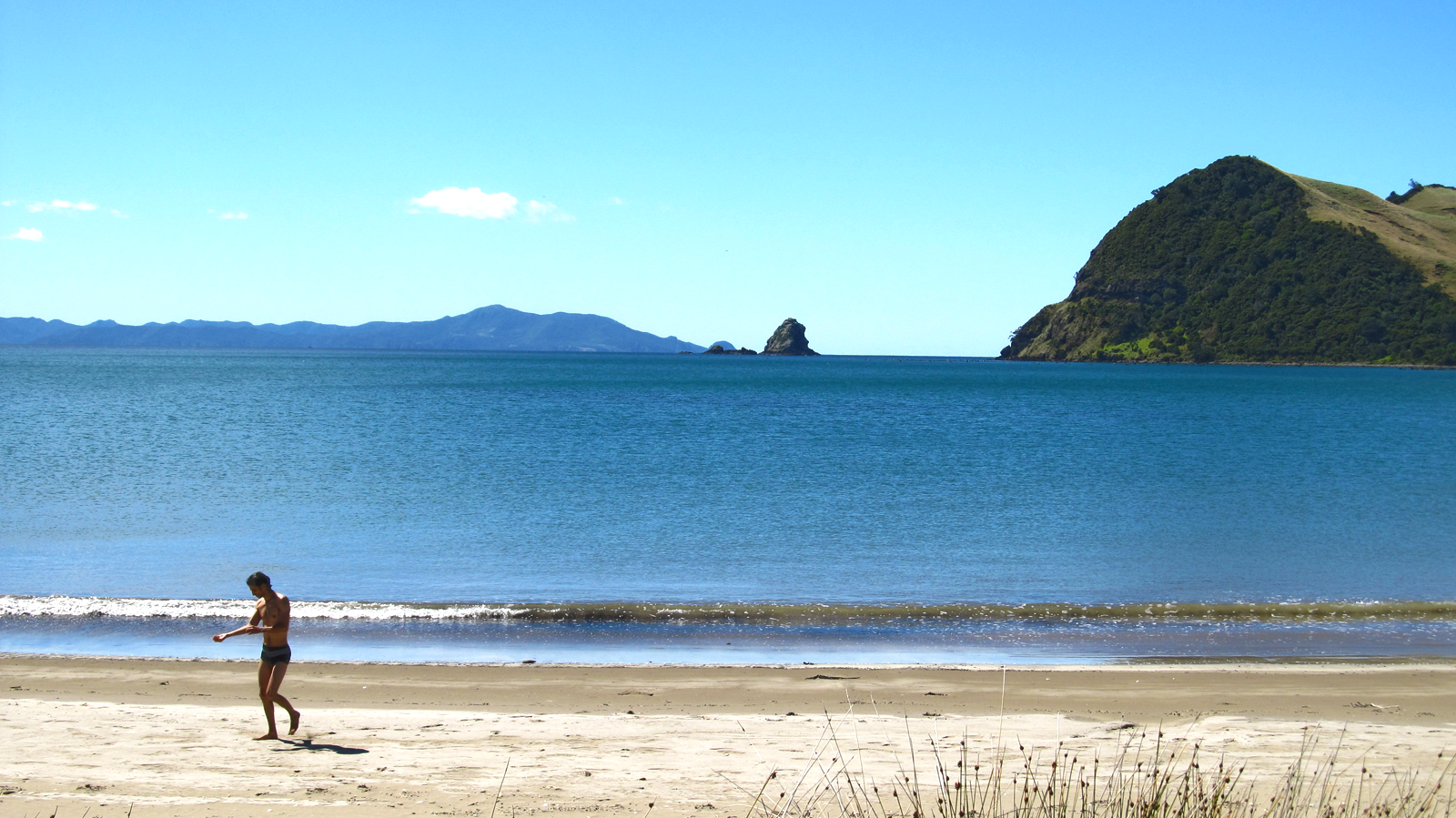
- View of Great Barrier Island and the Colville Channel from Sanby Bay on the Coromandel Peninsula

- Location in the Auckland Region
- Location: Auckland Region, New Zealand
- Coordinates: 36°23′31″S 175°25′34″E
- Part of: Hauraki Gulf / Tīkapa Moana

The Colville Channel is one of three channels connecting the Hauraki Gulf / Tīkapa Moana with the Pacific Ocean to the northeast of Auckland, New Zealand. It is the easternmost channel, lying between the southern end of Great Barrier Island and Cape Colville at the northern tip of the Coromandel Peninsula. The tiny Channel Island lies in the centre of the channel.

The other two channels are the Cradock Channel and the Jellicoe Channel.
