= Cradock Channel =

Channel northeast of Auckland, New Zealand

Coordinates: 36.211°S 175.199°E

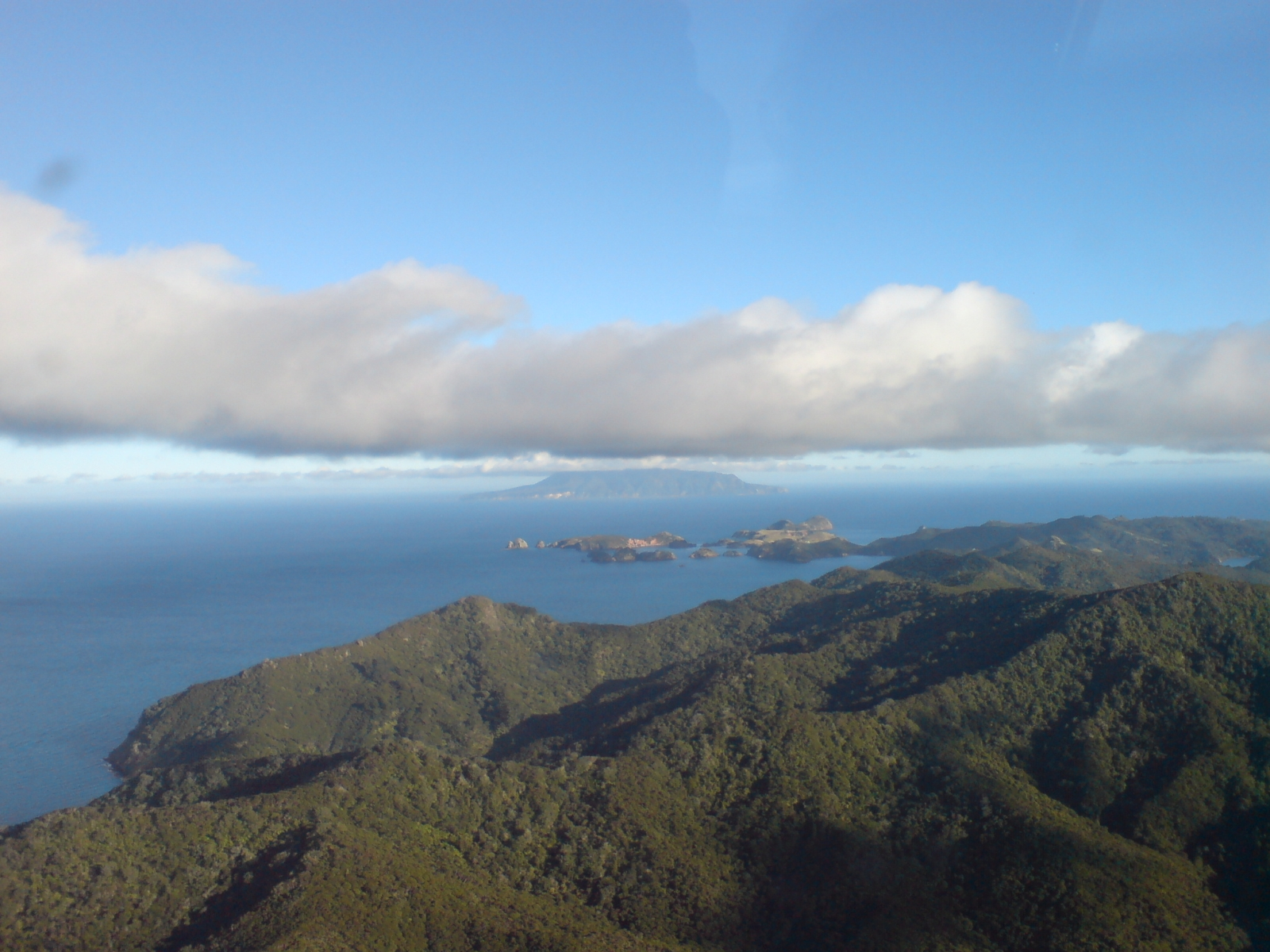
The Cradock Channel, looking west towards Little Barrier Island from Great Barrier Island.

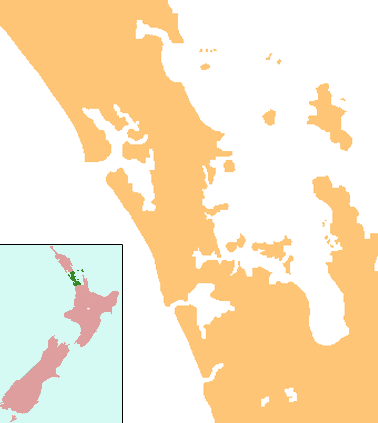

The Cradock Channel is one of three channels connecting the Hauraki Gulf with the Pacific Ocean to the northeast of Auckland, New Zealand. It is the central channel, lying between Great Barrier Island to the east and Little Barrier Island to the west. The other two channels are the Jellicoe Channel and the Colville Channel.

Approximately 17,000 years ago during the Last Glacial Period when sea levels were significantly lower, the area was a part of a vast coastal plain. The area where the Cradock Channel exists was where the Waitematā Harbour (then a river) and the Mahurangi River passed before reaching the Pacific Ocean.
