= Moehau Range =

Mountain range in North Island of New Zealand

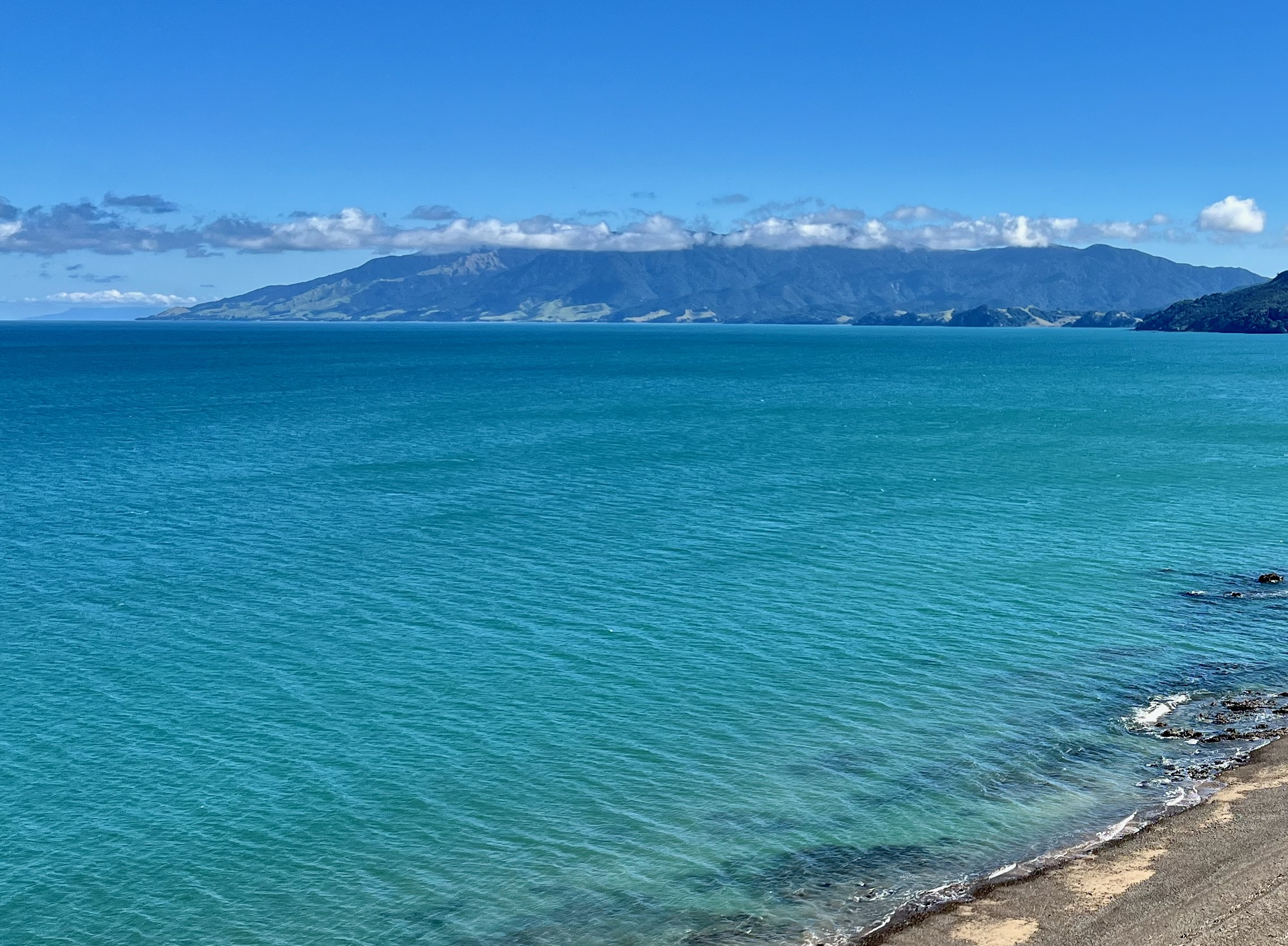
- Moehau Range from south of Amodeo Bay

Highest point
- Elevation: 892 m (2,927 ft)
- Coordinates: 36.54015°S 175.40215°E

Geography
- Approximate extent of Moehau Range

Geology
- Rock age(s): Jurassic/Cretaceous, about 150 million years ago
- Mountain type(s): mixed sedimentary greywacke with some plutonic and andestic formations
- Rock type(s): Predominantly Manaia Hill Group greywackeˌ sandstones and siltstones (Waipapa terrane)
- Volcanic arc: Coromandel Volcanic Zone
- Last eruption: ~ 15 million years ago

The Moehau Range is the northernmost range on the Coromandel Peninsula, extending from the settlement of Colville, New Zealand northwards to the tip of the peninsula. Mount Moehau is the highest point of the range, at 892m above sea level.

== Physical geography ==
The Moehau Range is the central feature of the Colville Ecological District. Environment Waikato's local area planting guide describes the area as "long ridges and steep streams radiating out to the coast, steep and broken hillslopes, floodplains, harbours and estuaries." The Colville Ecological District takes in 77,201 hectares (190,770 acres), 59% of which is in indigenous vegetation, and 8% of which is virgin forest. To the south the range is drained by Waikawau River.

=== Geology ===
Most of the range is made up of metamorphic, prehnite-pumpellyite Manaia Hill Group greywackeˌ sandstones and siltstones (Waipapa terrane) of Jurassic/Cretaceous age, formed about 150 million years ago. They have few fossils, but are interbedded with feldspar-lithic volcanic sandstone, siltstone and mudstone/argillite, with minor conglomerate and coarse sandstone. To the south west of the range the Paritu Pluton is exposed. It consists of 17 million year old mid Miocene sub-volcanic intrusions, including hornblende-pyroxene granodiorite, pyroxene-hornblende quartz diorite and biotite-pyroxene. Several dikes of andesite porphyry and quartz porphyry were intruded into the Manaia Hill rocks around 15 million years ago.

==== 'Granite' quarries ====
Coromandel granite was first advertised in 1900. It has been quarried in the plutonic area, on the coast between Port Jackson and Waiaro, at Paritu quarry, The quarry was taken over by the Coromandel Granite Company in 1918, when a wharf was built about a kilometre to the south. Although called granite, it is a quartz diorite rock. It has been used for many monuments and buildings, including Parliament House, Auckland Chief Post Office, Auckland War Memorial Museum, Auckland Ferry Terminal and Auckland Railway Station. Quarrying ended in the 1960s, though in the early 1990s Moehau quarry was reopened for the refurbishment of Parliament House.

== Demographics ==
The area is sparsely populated. In the area north of Port Charles Road, which includes the whole of the range, the 2013 population was only 129, living in 63 houses. However, it is part of Te Rerenga census area, where are 2,028 dwellings were occupied, but 3,897 unoccupied.

The main settlements are Port Jackson and Port Charles.

=== Port Jackson ===
Port Jackson is a bay on the north coast, just south of Cape Colville.

=== Port Charles ===
Cook named Port Charles as he sailed by on 17 November 1769. A sawmill opened in 1865 and closed in 1890, later belonging to the Auckland Timber Co and with a tramway. The population was 67 in 1901. Northern Steamship Co. vessels used to call at Port Charles. The road from Colville opened in 1928. A volunteer fire fighting group is based locally. There were severe floods in 1950 2002 and 2016, the 1950 flood moving the school off its foundations, bringing about its closure and 2002 flooding 23 homes. The beach is also being eroded.

== History ==
Mt Moehau is sacred to the Marutūāhu tribes of Māori. Many important chiefs, including Tama-te-kapua of Te Arawa, are buried on its summit. The full name of the mountain is Te Moengahau-o-Tamatekapua (the windy sleeping place of Tamatekapua).

== Folklore ==
Mt Moehau was reported by Māori to be the most sacred of the mountains of the Patupaiarehe (or tūrehu, karitehe or kōrakorako), an elusive and mystical light-skinned mountain folk.

== Biodiversity ==
The Moehau Range is considered one of New Zealand's six 'biodiversity hot spots'. The Moehau peak contains a selection of indigenous vegetation that is unique for a North Island forest, and is home to silver and pink pine, kaikawaka, sweet hutu (Ascarina sp.) and southern rātā, and is the northern limit for many southern montane species such as mountain toatoa and mountain cedar (pahautea). The range is also noteworthy for the rare native Archey's frog (Leiopelma archeyi), whose young hatch from eggs, bypassing the tadpole stage. Moehau is also home to the Moehau stag beetle (Geodorcus sp.), the Moehau wētā (Hemiandrus sp.) and a population of approximately 500 brown kiwi.

The Moehau Environment Group works to protect and enhance the natural environment of the Northern Coromandel Peninsula. In 2020 the group were given $400,000 to do possum, mustelid, rat and cat control on up to 15,000 ha (37,000 acres).
