= Cape Colville =

Cape on New Zealand's North Island

Cape Colville Te Wharekaiatua (Māori)
- Cape
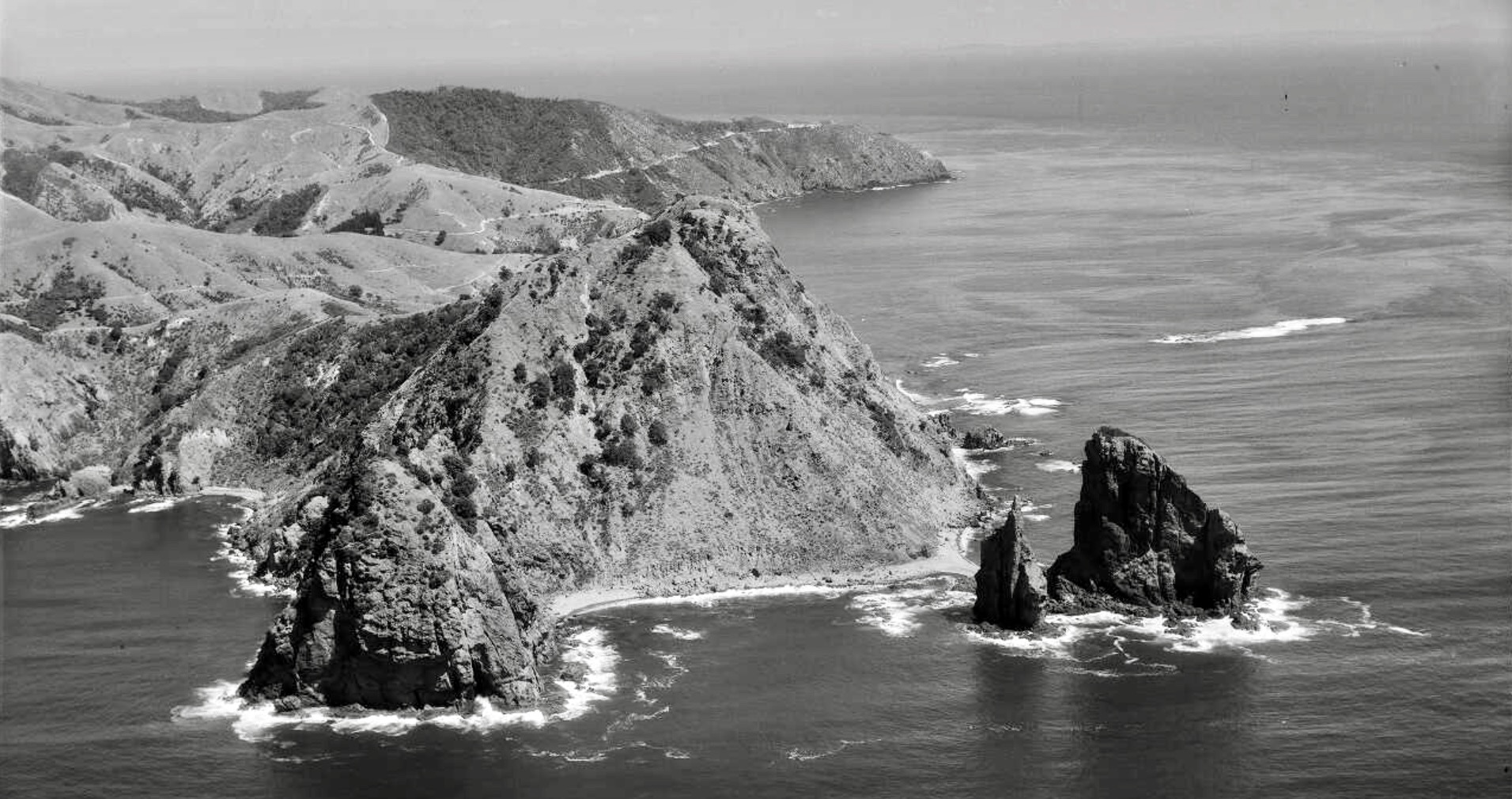
- Pinnacle Rock and Cape Colville in 1959
- Interactive map of Cape Colville
- Coordinates: 36.469759°S 175.345296°E
- Location: Port Jackson, Thames-Coromandel District, Waikato Region, New Zealand
- Water bodies: Colville Channel, Hauraki Gulf

Cape Colville is the northernmost point of the Coromandel Peninsula in New Zealand's North Island. It lies 85 kilometres north of Thames, and 70 kilometres northeast of the city of Auckland, on the other side of the Hauraki Gulf. The small settlements of Port Jackson and Fletcher Bay lie immediately to the west and east respectively of the cape.

Great Barrier Island lies to the north of Cape Colville, separated from it by 20-kilometre width of the Colville Channel. The tiny Channel Island lies between the two.

== Port Jackson ==
Port Jackson Bay, just to the south of the Cape, has been inhabited since at least the fifteenth century. At the south end of the Bay, at Port Jackson, a water-powered flax mill existed in 1901, when the population was just 12. There is a camp site. New Zealand dotterel (Anarhynchus obscurus), a species of plover, breed locally. Boneseed is a local weed. Dune restoration with spinifex was done from 2009 to 2011. There was much flooding in 2014. Killer whales (orca) inhabit the waters offshore, where they specialise in hunting eagle rays.

== See also ==
- Moehau Range
