= Horuhoru Rock (Gannet Rock) =

Island in New Zealand

Coordinates: 36°43′25″S 175°10′13″E

Gannet Rock
Māori: Horuhoru
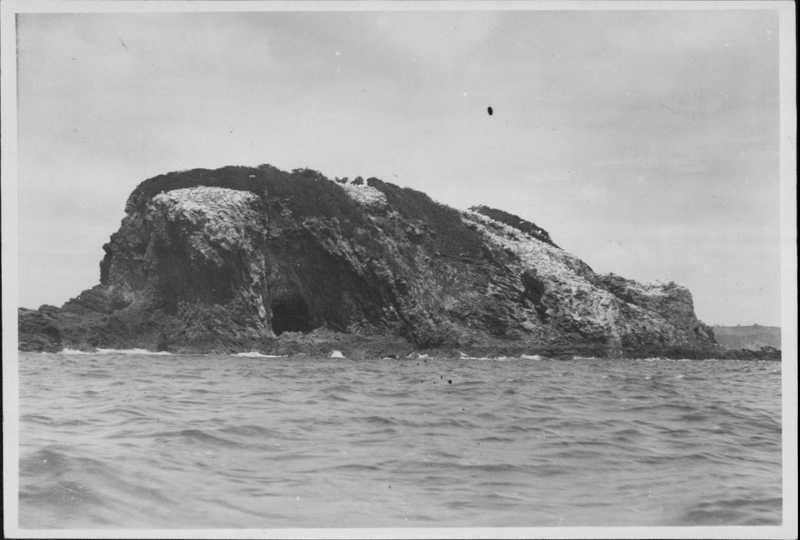
- Gannet Rock seen in 1935
- Interactive map of Gannet Rock

Geography
- Location: Hauraki Gulf, Auckland Region
- Area: 0.01 km^{2} (0.0039 sq mi)
- Length: 0.27 km (0.168 mi)
- Width: 0.07 km (0.043 mi)
- Highest elevation: 22 m (72 ft)

Administration
- New Zealand

See Alderney for the gannet colony Les Étacs, popularly called Gannet Rock

Horuhoru Rock (Gannet Rock) is an uninhabited rocky islet lying in the Hauraki Gulf, about 1.5 km north of the north-eastern end of Waiheke Island, New Zealand. It has been identified as an Important Bird Area by BirdLife International because it is a nesting site for about 2500 pairs of Australasian gannets.

== History ==
Traditional Tāmaki Māori histories describe a visit to Horuhoru Rock (Gannet Rock) by the crews of the migratory canoes Tainui and Arawa left Raiatea at similar times, and both explored the Bay of Plenty area. The crew of both canoes met at Horuhoru Rock, where a ceremony was held in memory for the relatives they had lost on the journey. During the ceremony, a mauri stone brought with them on their voyage named Tīkapa was placed on the island. The name Tīkapa Moana was adopted for the surrounding ocean, and became the name of the gulf.

== Wildlife ==
Gannet rock gets its name from the colony of Australasian gannets on Horuhoru. The gannets have a varied seafood-based diet, including arrow squid, blue mackerel and saury. Gannets usually forage within 50 km of their breeding colony. The species is not threatened, and has a possibly increasing total population.

== See also ==
- List of islands of New Zealand
- List of islands
- Desert island
