= Waikawau River (Thames-Coromandel District) =

Coordinates: 36°56′22.81″S 175°28′20.44″E

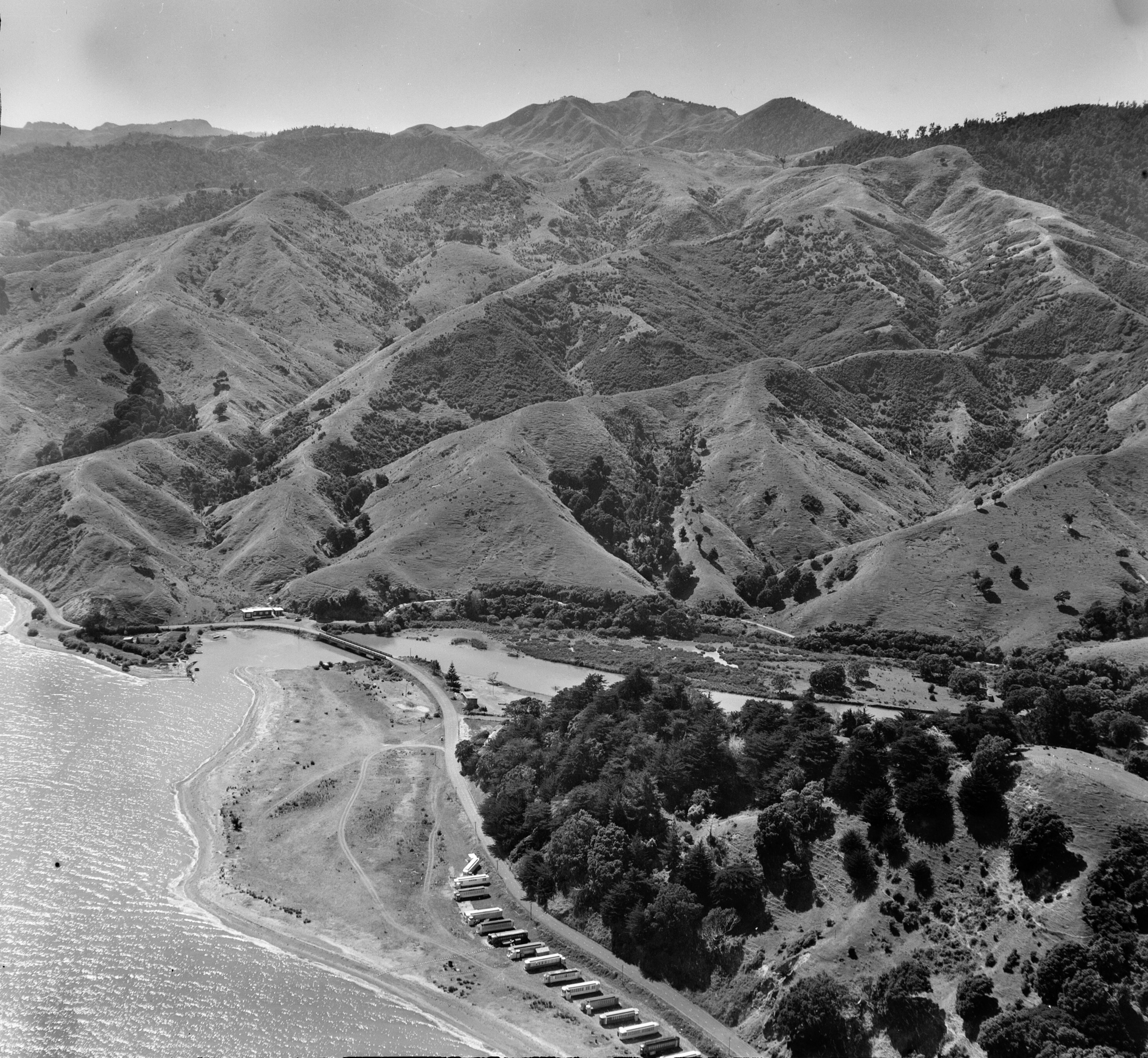
- Waikawau River and tramcars in 1956

Location
- Country: New Zealand

Physical characteristics
- Source
  - location: Kakatarahae Coromandel Range
  - elevation: 725 m (2,379 ft)
- Mouth
  - location: Firth of Thames
  - elevation: 0m
- Length: 20 km (12 mi)
- Basin size: 33 km^{2} (13 sq mi)
- Discharge
  - average: 73 m^{3}/s (2,600 cu ft/s)

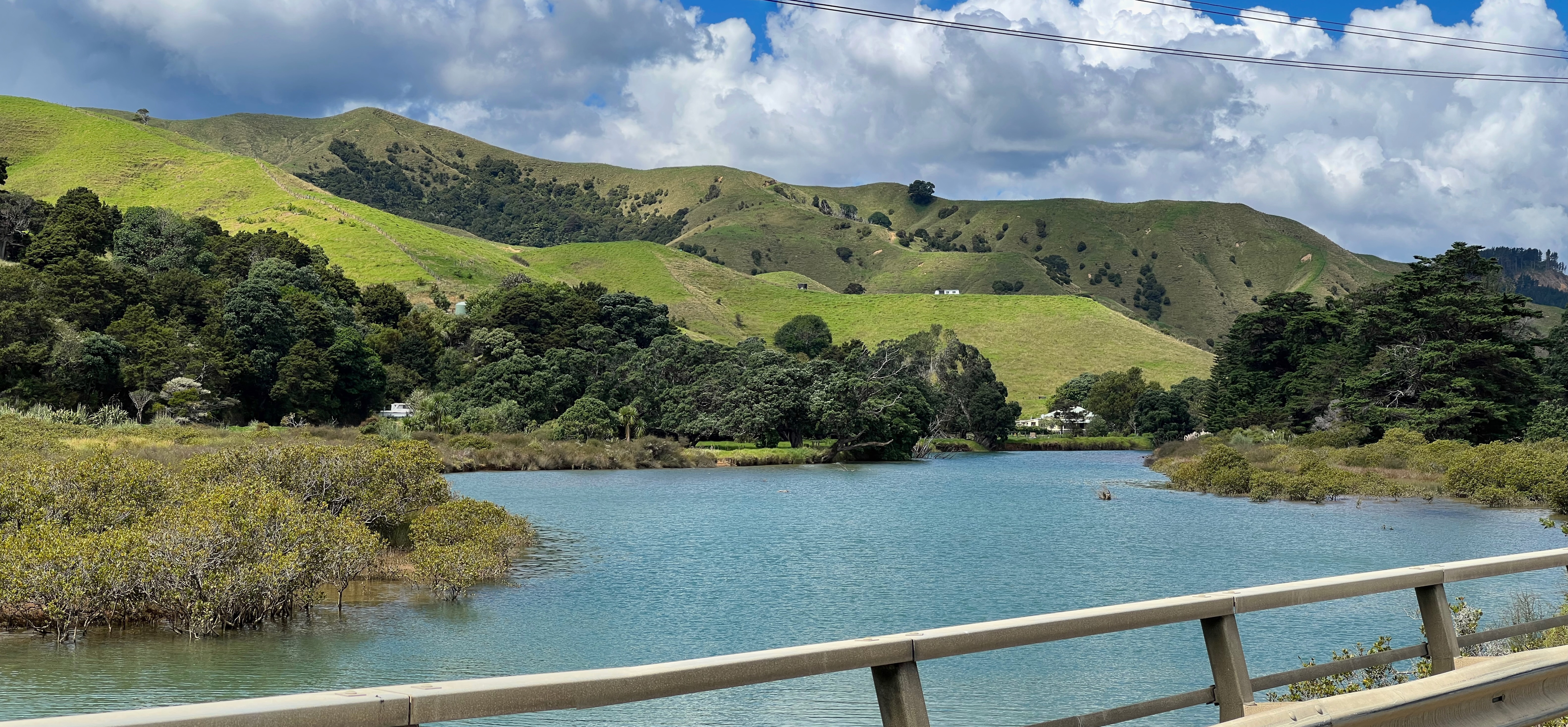
Waikawau River from SH25

The Waikawau River is the name of two rivers of the Coromandel Peninsula in New Zealand's North Island. The more southerly flows generally west from its sources in the Coromandel Range, reaching the Firth of Thames at Waikawau Beach, almost 6 km (3.7 mi) north of Tapu. The other flows south east off the Moehau Range to join the Pacific at Waikawau. Both rivers were officially named on 21 June 2019.

The New Zealand Ministry for Culture and Heritage gives a translation of "water of the shag" for Waikawau.

Fish in the river include longfin eels (tuna), torrentfish (panoko), koaro and īnanga.

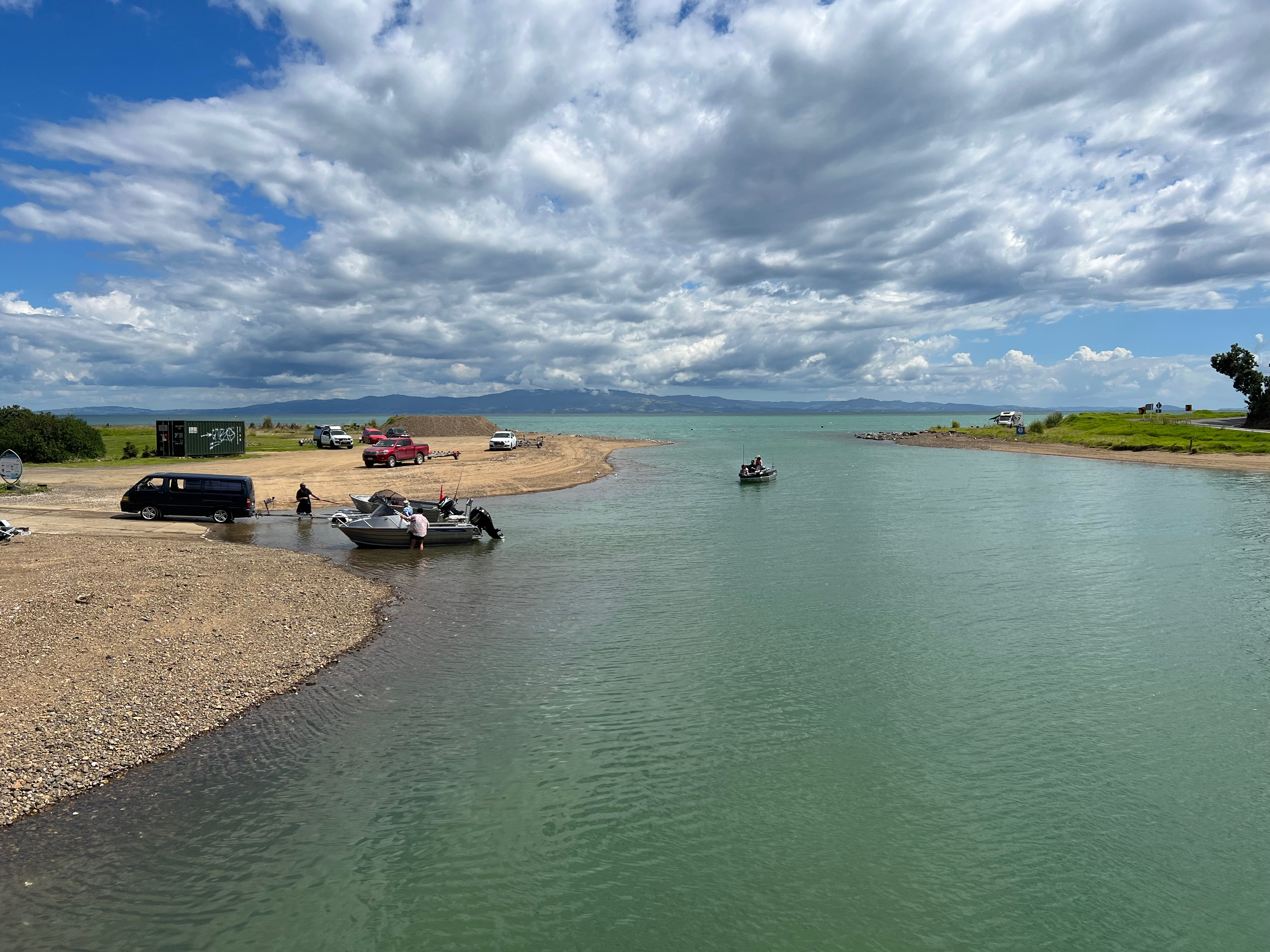
Waikawau River boat ramp

The area used by the boat ramp (since 2001) and car park is part of a delta formed by the river. Shingle was taken off the delta from at least 1920 to 1937. The 219 ton Devonport Steam Ferry paddle steamer Eagle (1886-1924) was on the beach at least from 1925 to 1927. Former Auckland tram bodies were moved to the south end of the delta in 1953 for use as holiday baches. Ngāati Tamaterā regained the delta and other areas under a Settlement dated 20 September 2017, following Land Court irregularities dating back to 1878.

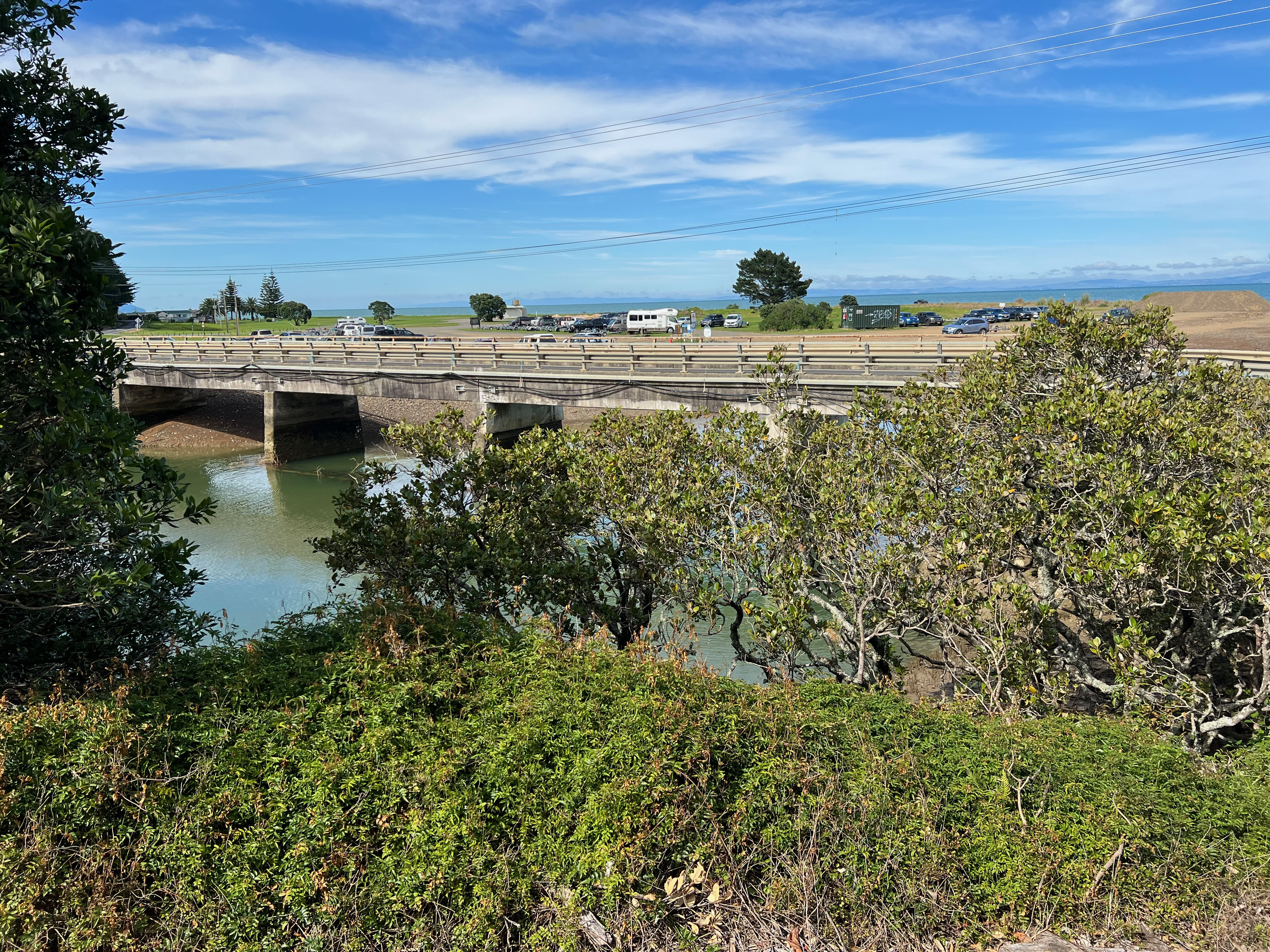
Waikawau River bridge

The first bridge over the river was built in 1885. A single lane concrete bridge now carries SH25 over the river.

== See also ==
- List of rivers of New Zealand
