= Gannett (surname) =

Gannett is a surname. Notable people with the surname include:

- Abbie M. Gannett (1845–1895), American essayist, poet and philanthropist
- Alice P. Gannett (1875-1962), American settlement house worker and social reformer
- Ann Cole Gannett (1916-1997), American politician
- Barzillai Gannett (1764–1832), American politician
- Diana Gannett, American classical double bassist and educator
- Ezra Stiles Gannett (1801–1871), American unitarian minister
- Frank Gannett (1876–1957), American publisher, founder of Gannett Company
- Henry Gannett (1846–1914), American geographer
- Lewis Gannett, American writer
- Robert T. Gannett (1917–2012), American politician
