= Gannet Lake =

- Location within Georgia
- Location: Ware County, Georgia
- Coordinates: 30.6627299°N 82.2440097°W
- Type: lake

Gannet Lake is a lake in the U.S. state of Georgia.

Gannet Lake was named for flocks of gannets on the water.
