= Jellicoe Channel =

Coordinates: 36.2246°S 175.0088°E

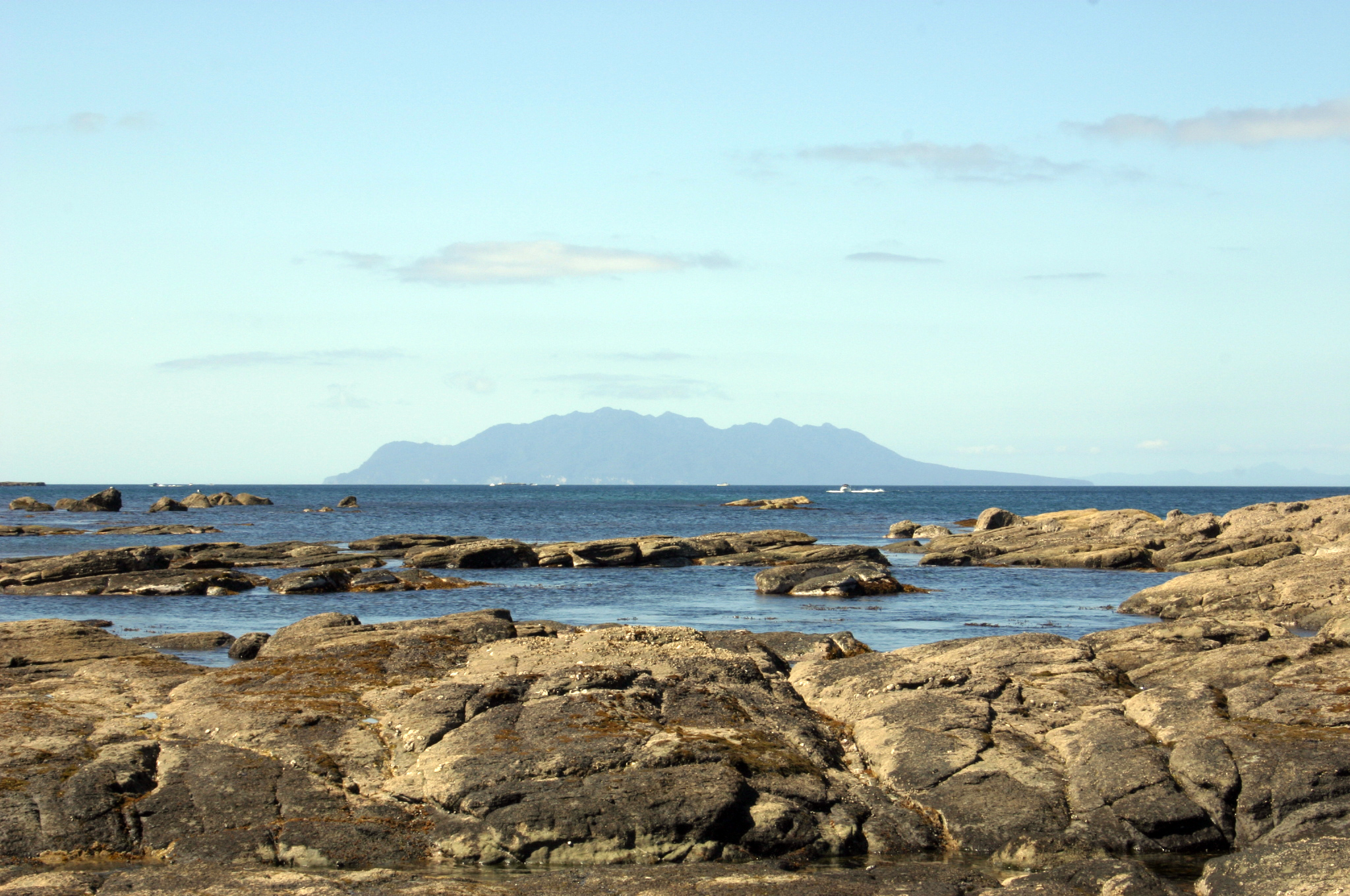
The Jellicoe Channel, looking east towards Little Barrier Island.

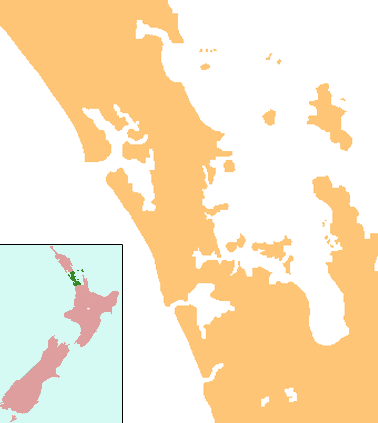

The Jellicoe Channel is one of three channels connecting the Hauraki Gulf with the Pacific Ocean to the northeast of Auckland, New Zealand. It is the westernmost channel, lying between Cape Rodney on the North Auckland Peninsula and Little Barrier Island.

The other two channels are the Cradock Channel and the Colville Channel.
