= Te Ārai =

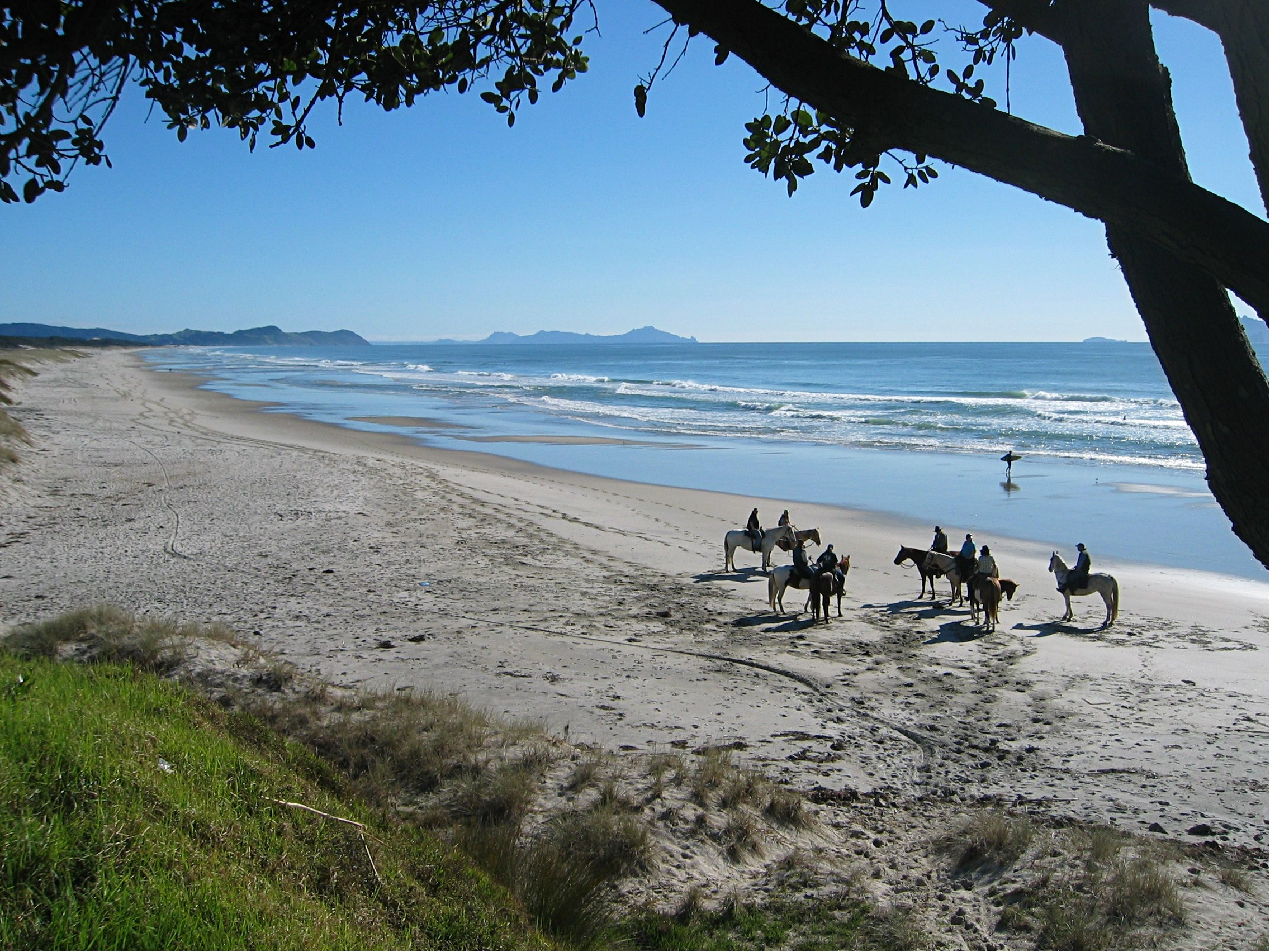
- Horse riders and surfers on Te Ārai Beach
- Interactive map of Te Ārai
- Coordinates: 36.198°S 174.581°E
- Country: New Zealand
- Region: Auckland Region
- Ward: Rodney ward
- Community board: Rodney Local Board
- Subdivision: Wellsford subdivision

Government
  - Territorial Authority: Auckland Council

| Kaiwaka | Mangawhai | Ārai Point |
| Topuni | Te Ārai | Tomarata |
| Te Hana | Wellsford | Whangaripo |

Te Ārai is a small community on the east coast of the North Island of New Zealand, in the northern part of the Rodney ward of the Auckland Region. Mangawhai lies to the north, and Tomarata to the south. The name comes from Tāhuhunui-o-te-rangi, captain of the Moekākara waka, who landed here and set up a temporary shelter (ārai). Tāhuhunui-o-te-rangi was later buried at Te Ārai.

== Geography ==
Te Ārai Beach is sandy and one of the best surf locations on the Auckland region's east coast. It is the exact antipode of Gibraltar making it the only place in the world which speaks the same language (English) as its antipode.

Among the bird species found here is the critically endangered New Zealand fairy tern, of which only 11 breeding pairs are left in the world. Auckland Council manages Te Ārai Regional Park.

== History ==
The Arai Road District was formed on 20 February 1868. It governed Te Arai until around 1886, when it was dissolved.

== Economy ==
Tourism and farming are the predominant activities in the area.
