= Whenuakite =

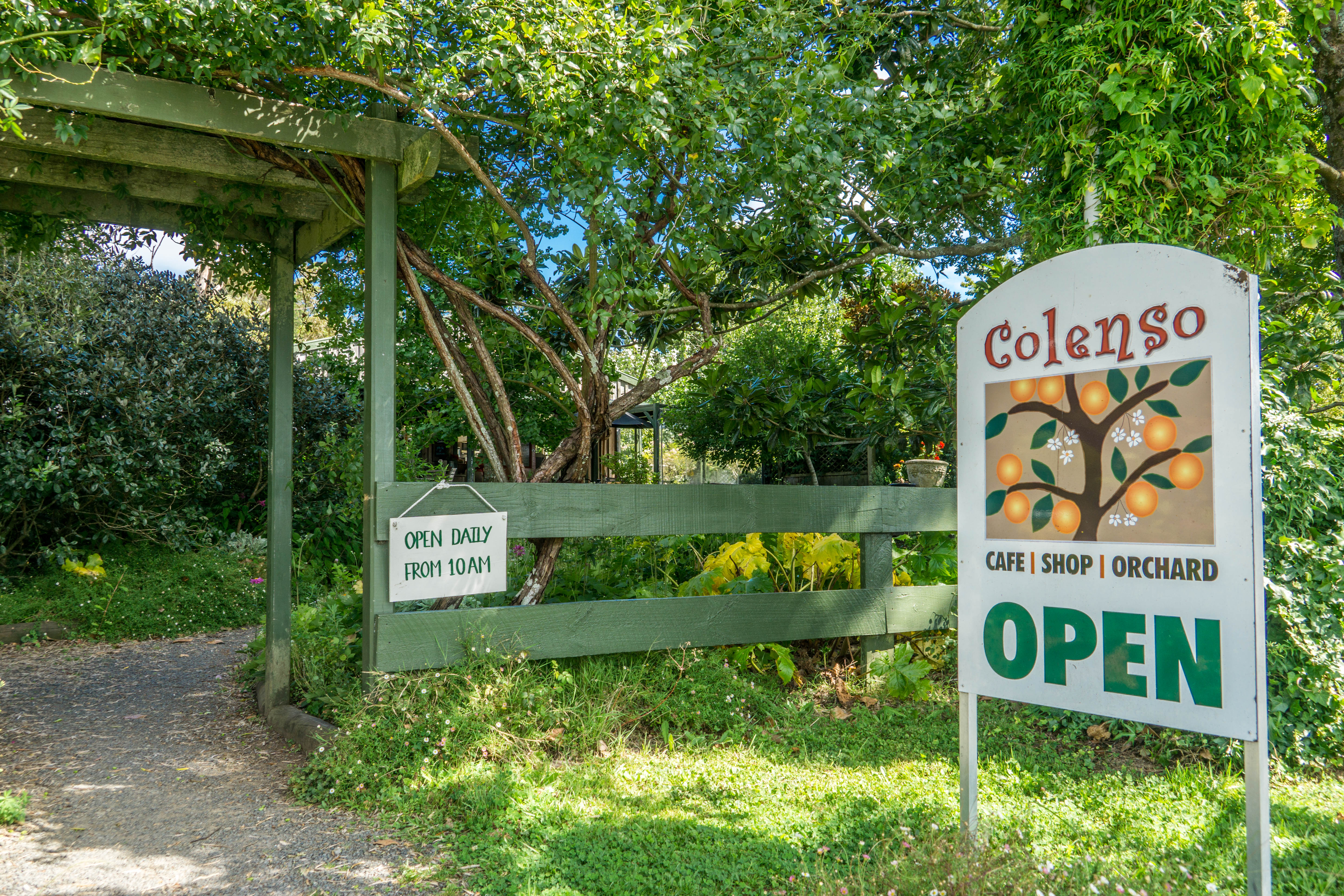
- Colenso Café on State Highway 25 near Whenuakite
- Interactive map of Whenuakite
- Coordinates: 36°54′44″S 175°46′19″E
- Country: New Zealand
- Region: Waikato
- District: Thames-Coromandel District
- Ward: Mercury Bay ward
- Community Board: Mercury Bay Community
- Electorates: Coromandel; Hauraki-Waikato (Māori)

Government
  - Council: Thames-Coromandel District Council
  - Regional council: Waikato Regional Council
  - Mayor of Thames-Coromandel: Peter Revell
  - Coromandel MP: Scott Simpson
  - Hauraki-Waikato MP: Hana-Rawhiti Maipi-Clarke
- Postcode: 3591

Whenuakite is a locality on the Coromandel Peninsula of New Zealand. State Highway 25 runs through it. Whitianga is north west, Coroglen 8 km west, Cooks Beach and Hahei north, Hot Water Beach north east, and Tairua 18 km to the south east. The Whenuakite River flows from coastal hills in the east through the area to drain in the Whitianga Harbour.

== Demographics ==
Whenuakite is in the statistical area of Mercury Bay South, which also includes Coroglen and Hahei, but not Cooks Beach or Tairua. The statistical area covers 359.40 km^{2} (138.77 sq mi) and had an estimated population of 1,470 as of June 2025, with a population density of 4.1 people per km^{2}.

Historical population for Mercury Bay South
Year	Pop.	±% p.a.
2006	1,170	—
2013	1,092	−0.98%
2018	1,224	+2.31%
2023	1,437	+3.26%

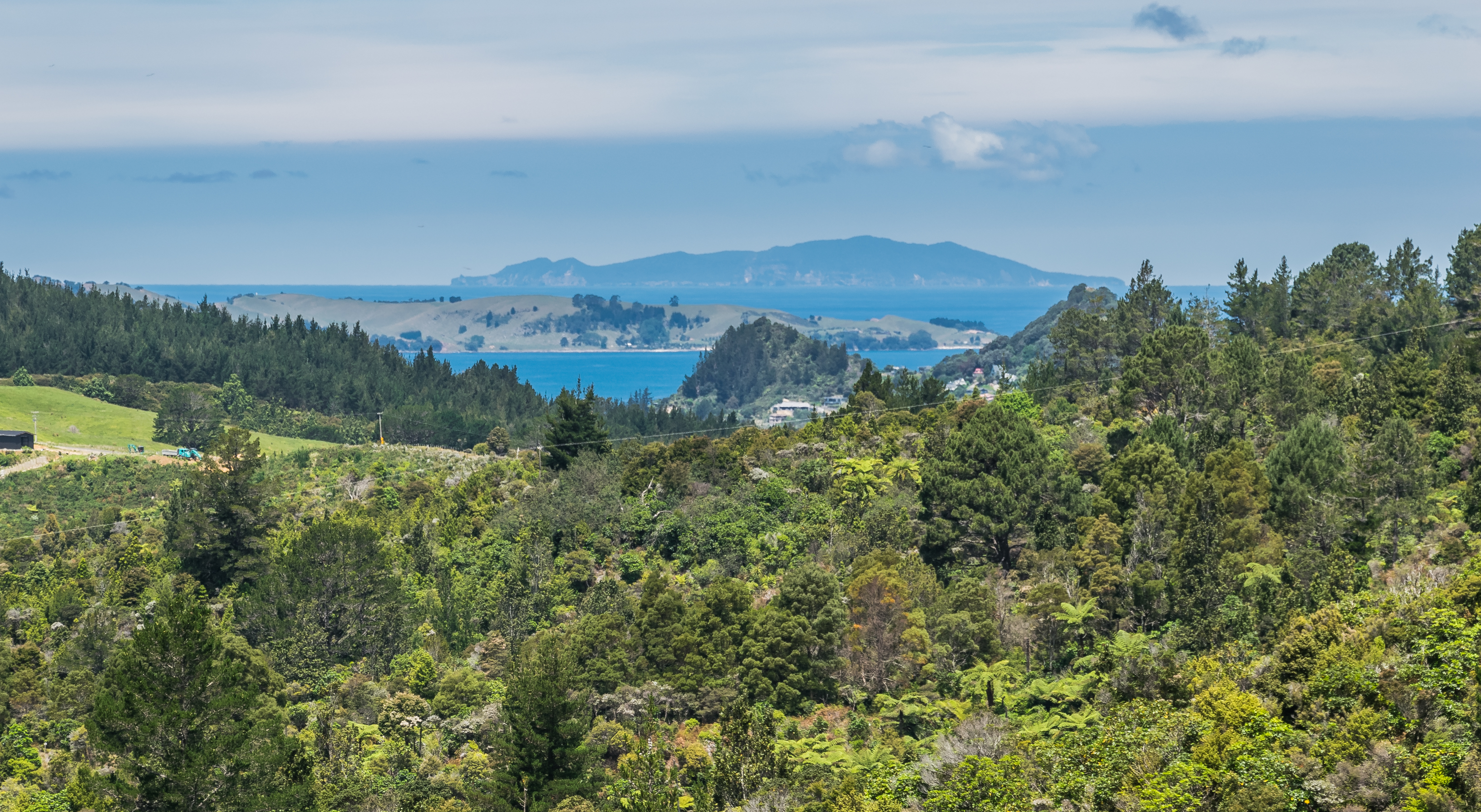
View from Whenuakite Kiwi Zone Viewpoint, about 9 km southeast of Whenuakite

Mercury Bay South had a population of 1,437 in the 2023 New Zealand census, an increase of 213 people (17.4%) since the 2018 census, and an increase of 345 people (31.6%) since the 2013 census. There were 708 males and 726 females in 567 dwellings. 1.9% of people identified as LGBTIQ+. The median age was 49.2 years (compared with 38.1 years nationally). There were 231 people (16.1%) aged under 15 years, 186 (12.9%) aged 15 to 29, 663 (46.1%) aged 30 to 64, and 360 (25.1%) aged 65 or older.

People could identify as more than one ethnicity. The results were 94.4% European (Pākehā); 10.4% Māori; 1.0% Pasifika; 0.6% Asian; 1.0% Middle Eastern, Latin American and African New Zealanders (MELAA); and 2.3% other, which includes people giving their ethnicity as "New Zealander". English was spoken by 98.7%, Māori language by 2.7%, and other languages by 7.3%. No language could be spoken by 1.3% (e.g. too young to talk). The percentage of people born overseas was 18.8, compared with 28.8% nationally.

Religious affiliations were 23.4% Christian, 0.4% Māori religious beliefs, 0.4% Buddhist, 0.6% New Age, and 1.5% other religions. People who answered that they had no religion were 66.2%, and 7.7% of people did not answer the census question.

Of those at least 15 years old, 288 (23.9%) people had a bachelor's or higher degree, 651 (54.0%) had a post-high school certificate or diploma, and 279 (23.1%) people exclusively held high school qualifications. The median income was $34,700, compared with $41,500 nationally. 84 people (7.0%) earned over $100,000 compared to 12.1% nationally. The employment status of those at least 15 was that 540 (44.8%) people were employed full-time, 258 (21.4%) were part-time, and 21 (1.7%) were unemployed.

== Education ==
Whenuakite School is a coeducational full primary school (years 1–8) with a roll of 152 as of July 2026. The school was founded in 1908.
