= Poikeke Island =

Island in New Zealand

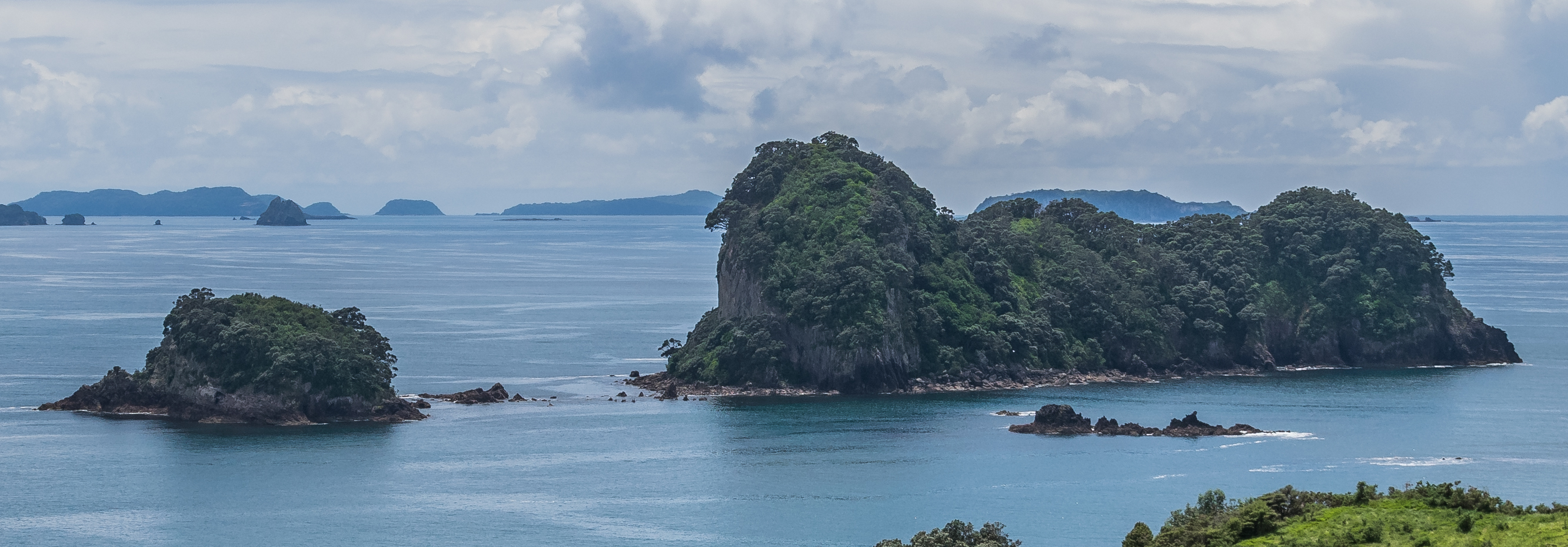
- Poikeke Island seen from the Coromandel Peninsula, to the left of Motueka Island (Pigeon Island)
- Interactive map of Poikeke Island

Geography
- Location: Coromandel Peninsula
- Coordinates: 36°29′28″S 175°28′30″E
- Adjacent to: Pacific Ocean

Administration
- New Zealand

Poikeke Island is an island off the coast of the Coromandel Peninsula in New Zealand.

== Geography ==
The island is located approximately 900 metres north-east of Cathedral Cove, to the east of Mercury Bay. It is tidally linked to Motueka Island (Pigeon Island), a larger island located to the east. Poikeke and Motueka islands are remnants of an eroded Miocene era lava dome, composed of flow-banded rhyolite.

== Biodiversity ==
The island is primarily forested by native New Zealand broadleaf forest. The island's plateau is dominated by tawāpou, with abundant houpara also seen here. The sooty shearwater is known to nest on the island.

== History ==
The island is historically significant to Ngāti Hei, who are the mana whenua iwi for Poikeke Island. During pre-European history, the island was occupied as a fortified pā, and the top of the island may have been levelled during this time. Captain James Cook landed on the island on 15 November 1769, when it was still actively being used as a pā.

The origin of the name Poikeke Island is unknown.
