= Tapu River =

Coordinates: 36.983995°S 175.500037°E

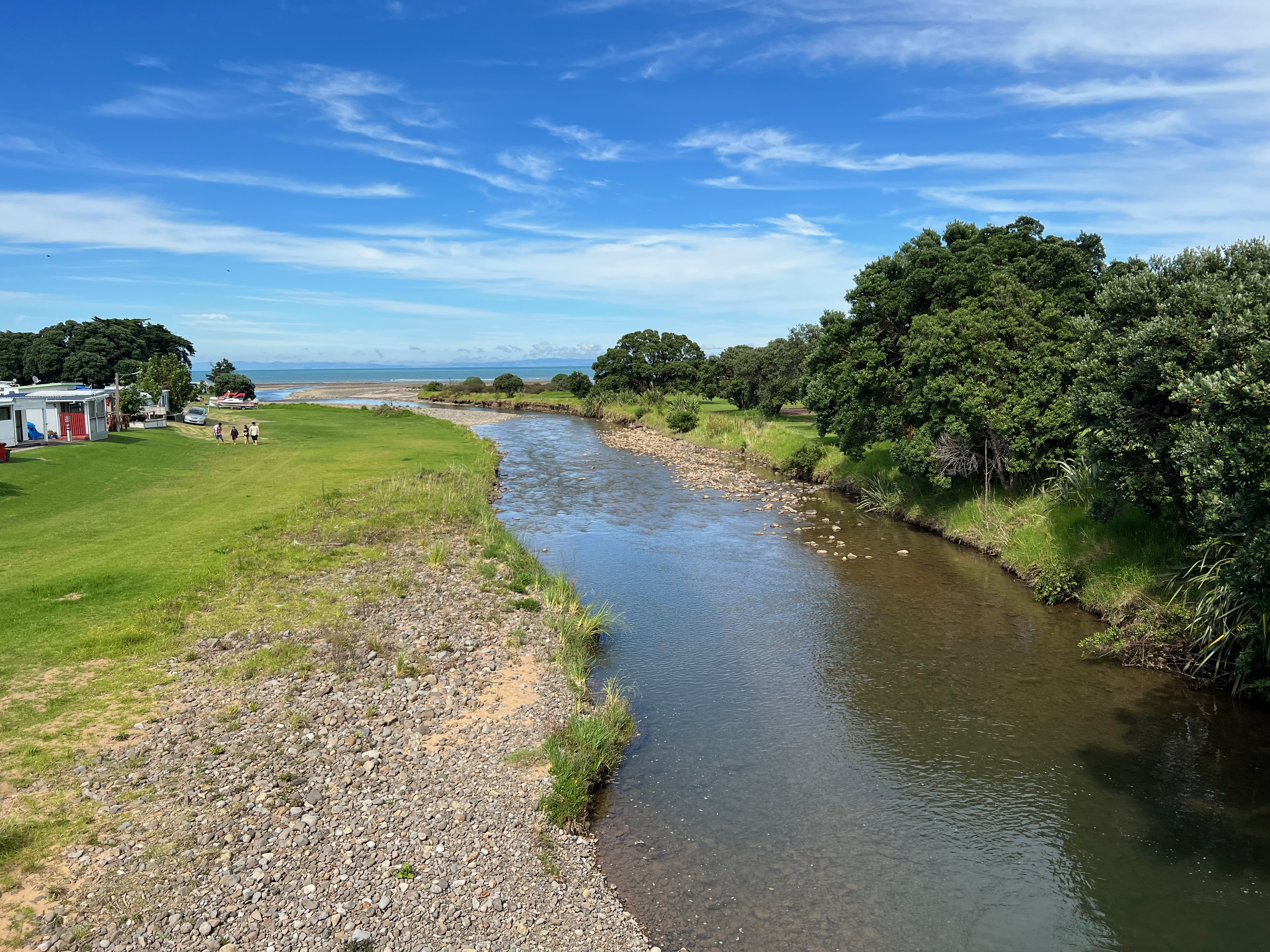
- Tapu River estuary

Location
- Country: New Zealand

Physical characteristics
- Source
  - location: Coromandel Range
  - elevation: 644 m (2,113 ft)
- Mouth
  - location: Firth of Thames
  - elevation: 0m
- Length: 10.4 km (6.5 mi)
- Basin size: 26 km^{2} (10 sq mi)

The Tapu River (Waipatukahu Stream prior to 1974) is a river of the Coromandel Peninsula in New Zealand's North Island. It flows west from the Coromandel Range, reaching the Firth of Thames at the settlement of Tapu, approximately halfway between Thames and Coromandel.

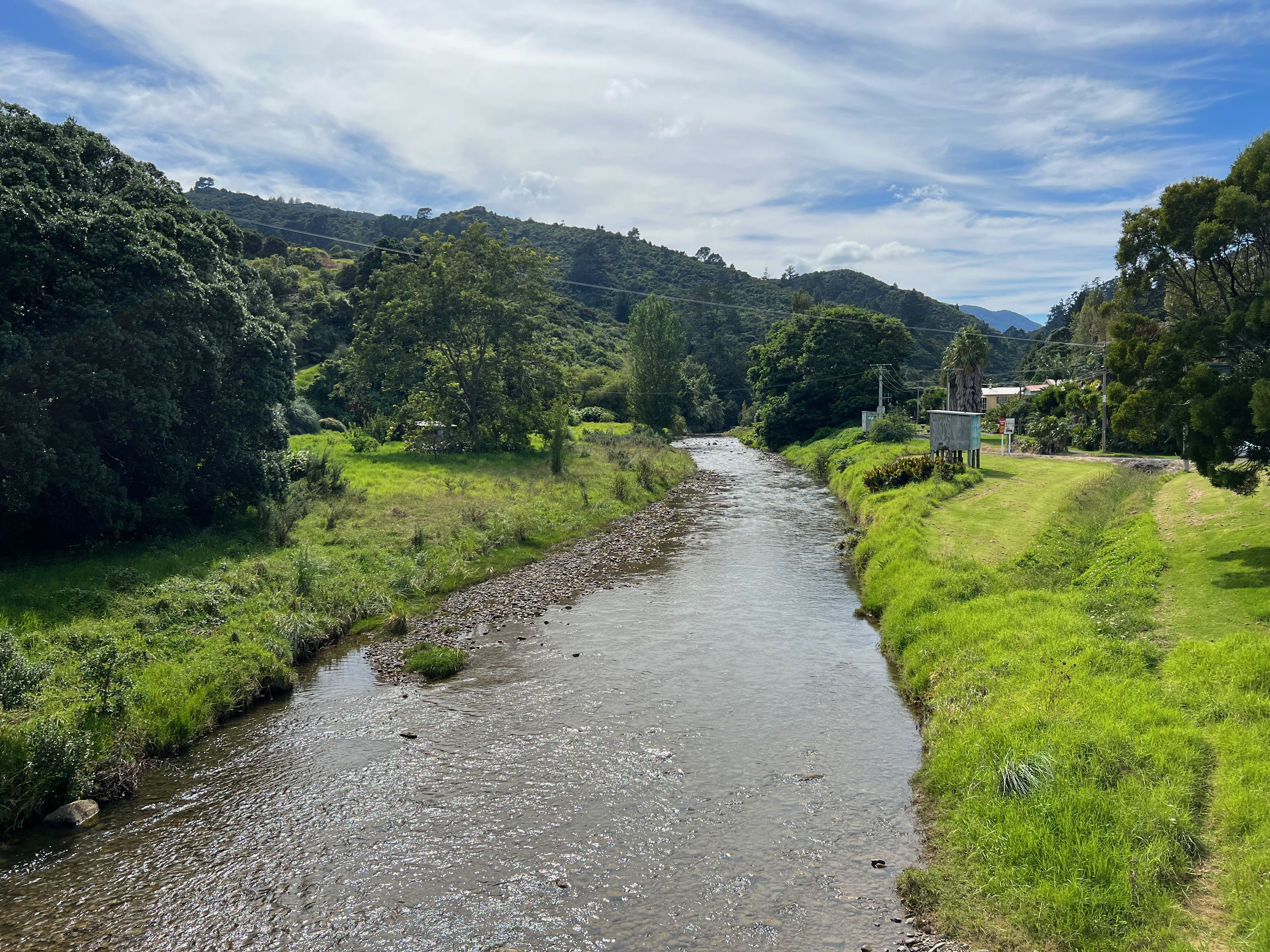
Tapu River from SH25 bridge

Except for ammoniacal nitrogen, water quality in the river is good, as it mainly drains native forest; only 5.1% of the catchment is farmed. The river runs over andesite and dacite. Fish in the river include long and shortfin eels (tuna), common bully (toitoi), redfin bully, torrentfish (panoko), smelt (pōrohe), īnanga, koura, trout and shrimp. To protect Tapu from flooding, the flow capacity of the river has been maximised. The native frogs, Leiopelma archeyi and Leiopelma hochstetteri, live near the valley.

The Tapu-Coroglen Road, opened in 1927, follows the river, passing the Rapaura Watergardens and the square kauri tree. Kauri was logged in the 1880s and 1950s. The SH25 bridge was built about 1937.

Gold was mined in the valley from 1868 at several mines; mining continued in the area until at least the 1930s.

== See also ==
- List of rivers of New Zealand
