= Hahei =

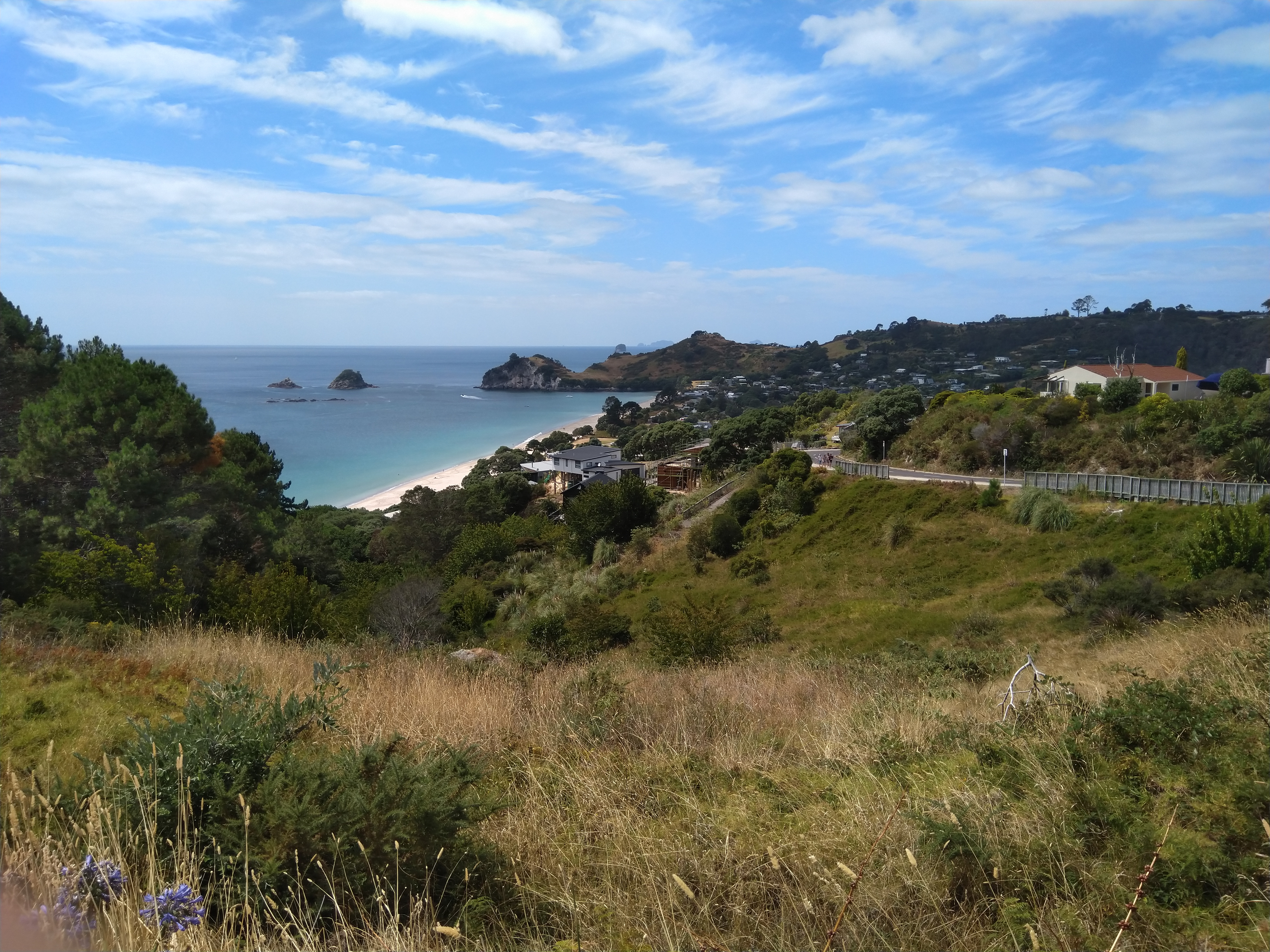
- View of Hahei township and beach
- Interactive map of Hahei
- Coordinates: 36°50′S 175°48′E
- Country: New Zealand
- Region: Waikato
- District: Thames-Coromandel District
- Ward: Mercury Bay ward
- Community Board: Mercury Bay Community
- Electorates: Coromandel; Hauraki-Waikato (Māori)

Government
  - Council: Thames-Coromandel District Council
  - Regional council: Waikato Regional Council
  - Mayor of Thames-Coromandel: Peter Revell
  - Coromandel MP: Scott Simpson
  - Hauraki-Waikato MP: Hana-Rawhiti Maipi-Clarke

Area
  - Territorial: 1.67 km^{2} (0.64 sq mi)

Population (June 2025)
  - Territorial: 320
  - Density: 190/km^{2} (500/sq mi)
- Time zone: UTC+12 (NZST)
  - Summer (DST): UTC+13 (NZDT)
- Area code: 07

Hahei is a small settlement in Mercury Bay on the eastern side of the Coromandel Peninsula in New Zealand. It is near Cathedral Cove, between the settlements of Cooks Beach and Hot Water Beach. It is approximately 11 km south east of Whitianga and 8 km north of Hot Water Beach.

The driving route to Whitianga from Hahei is circuitous and takes approximately 30 minutes. An alternative route is by road to Ferry Landing, which takes 15 minutes, and then a short passenger ferry trip to Whitianga. A ferry service to Whitianga has served the eastern Mercury Bay area since 1895.

A prominent feature of the beach is Mahurangi Island (Goat Island), which lies on the edge of the Te Whanganui-A-Hei (Cathedral Cove) Marine Reserve.

== History ==
The name of the settlement of Hahei is derived from the Māori name for Mercury Bay, Te-Whanganui-A-Hei, or "The Great Bay of Hei". According to tradition, Hei was one of three brothers who arrived in New Zealand with Kupe. With his family he settled in the area of Oahei, which is now Hahei, and they became the ancestors of the Ngati Hei people. However, in 1818 the Ngati Hei people were attacked by the Ngā Puhi tribe, and almost completely wiped out. The remnant of the Ngati Hei people fled, leaving the land vacant.

The valley of Hahei was purchased in the 1870s by Robert Wigmore, who was the Registrar of Births, Deaths and Marriages from 1876 to 1887. Robert Wigmore built the kauri homestead which is still standing today. The burial place of Robert Wigmore and his wife Fanny is marked by a cairn in the Wigmore Historic Reserve, at the end of Hahei Beach Road by the beach.

In 1915 the property was purchased by the brothers Horace and Walter Harsant. The farm primarily supported a dairy herd, but pigs, fruit and crayfish were also part of the produce sold at the nearby store of Coroglen.

Transport at that time was difficult. Heavy and large goods had to be transported by sea, and for an ordinary shopping trip the Harsants would ride on horseback to the river and "coo-ee" loudly for the boatman to ferry them across.

In 1946 Vaughan Harsant bought and lived in the homestead with his young son, and as Hahei began to gain popularity as a camping site, he and his wife Dawn developed the camping ground, and began to subdivide areas of the farm near the beach into residential sections.

== Demographics ==
Hahei is described by Statistics New Zealand as a rural settlement. It covers 1.67 km^{2} (0.64 sq mi) and had an estimated population of 320 as of June 2025, with a population density of 192 people per km^{2}. Hahei is part of the larger Mercury Bay South statistical area.

Historical population
Year	Pop.	±% p.a.
2006	366	—
2013	231	−6.36%
2018	234	+0.26%
2023	309	+5.72%

Hāhei had a population of 309 in the 2023 New Zealand census, an increase of 75 people (32.1%) since the 2018 census, and an increase of 78 people (33.8%) since the 2013 census. There were 135 males and 174 females in 147 dwellings. 1.9% of people identified as LGBTIQ+. The median age was 56.7 years (compared with 38.1 years nationally). There were 30 people (9.7%) aged under 15 years, 48 (15.5%) aged 15 to 29, 129 (41.7%) aged 30 to 64, and 105 (34.0%) aged 65 or older.

People could identify as more than one ethnicity. The results were 96.1% European (Pākehā); 7.8% Māori; 1.0% Pasifika; 1.0% Middle Eastern, Latin American and African New Zealanders (MELAA); and 1.9% other, which includes people giving their ethnicity as "New Zealander". English was spoken by 98.1%, Māori language by 1.9%, and other languages by 8.7%. No language could be spoken by 1.9% (e.g. too young to talk). The percentage of people born overseas was 27.2, compared with 28.8% nationally.

Religious affiliations were 32.0% Christian, and 1.0% other religions. People who answered that they had no religion were 60.2%, and 6.8% of people did not answer the census question.

Of those at least 15 years old, 93 (33.3%) people had a bachelor's or higher degree, 138 (49.5%) had a post-high school certificate or diploma, and 54 (19.4%) people exclusively held high school qualifications. The median income was $34,700, compared with $41,500 nationally. 24 people (8.6%) earned over $100,000 compared to 12.1% nationally. The employment status of those at least 15 was that 108 (38.7%) people were employed full-time, 60 (21.5%) were part-time, and 6 (2.2%) were unemployed.

== Tourism ==
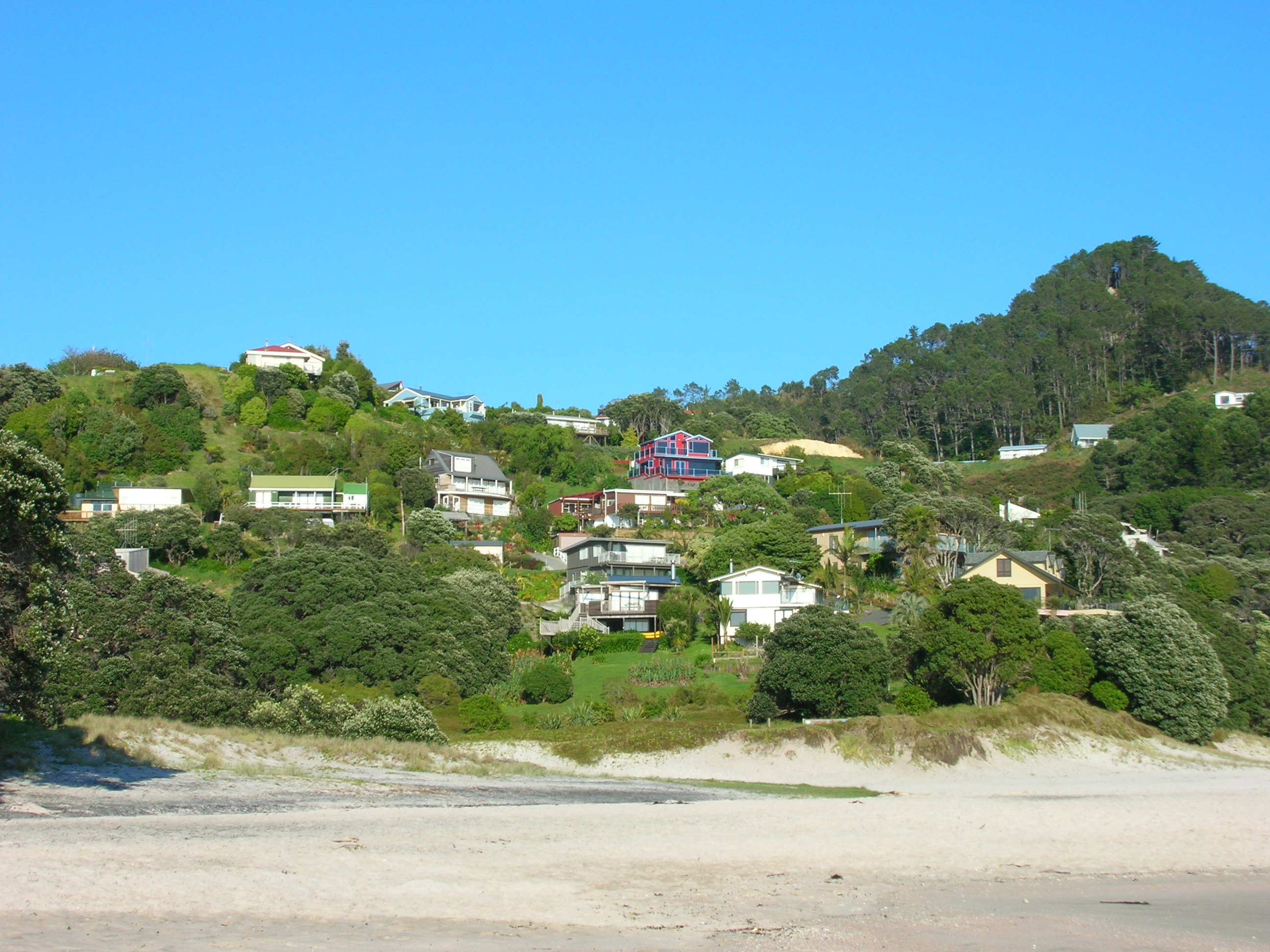
Hahei Beach dwellings

Hahei is a popular holiday destination, with a white sandy beach and sheltered aspect, resulting in safe sheltered swimming waters. Its resident population is around 300, but in peak holiday periods the population swells to more than 10 times this. On the southern end of the beach is Te Pare Historic Reserve, which was once the site of two Māori pā, Hereheretaura Pā and Hahei Pā.

Hahei is located close to the start of the Cathedral Cove walkway and in the peak has nearly 500,000 day trippers and visitors who come just to visit the Cove. This can lead to congestion and parking issues. The car park at the start of the walkway is closed from 1 Oct to 30 April and visitors are encouraged to park at the village entrance and use a park and ride shuttle bus. Off-peak 1 May to 30 Sept there is pay and display parking at the car park at the start of the walk.

The town centre consists of two cafés, a gift shop, a general store with a petrol station and a takeaways bar, a dive shop, and an ice cream and pizza parlour. Other holiday related businesses include kayaking, snorkelling and boat trips to Cathedral Cove and the Marine Reserve.
