= Cooks Beach =

Cooks Beach (Pukaki)
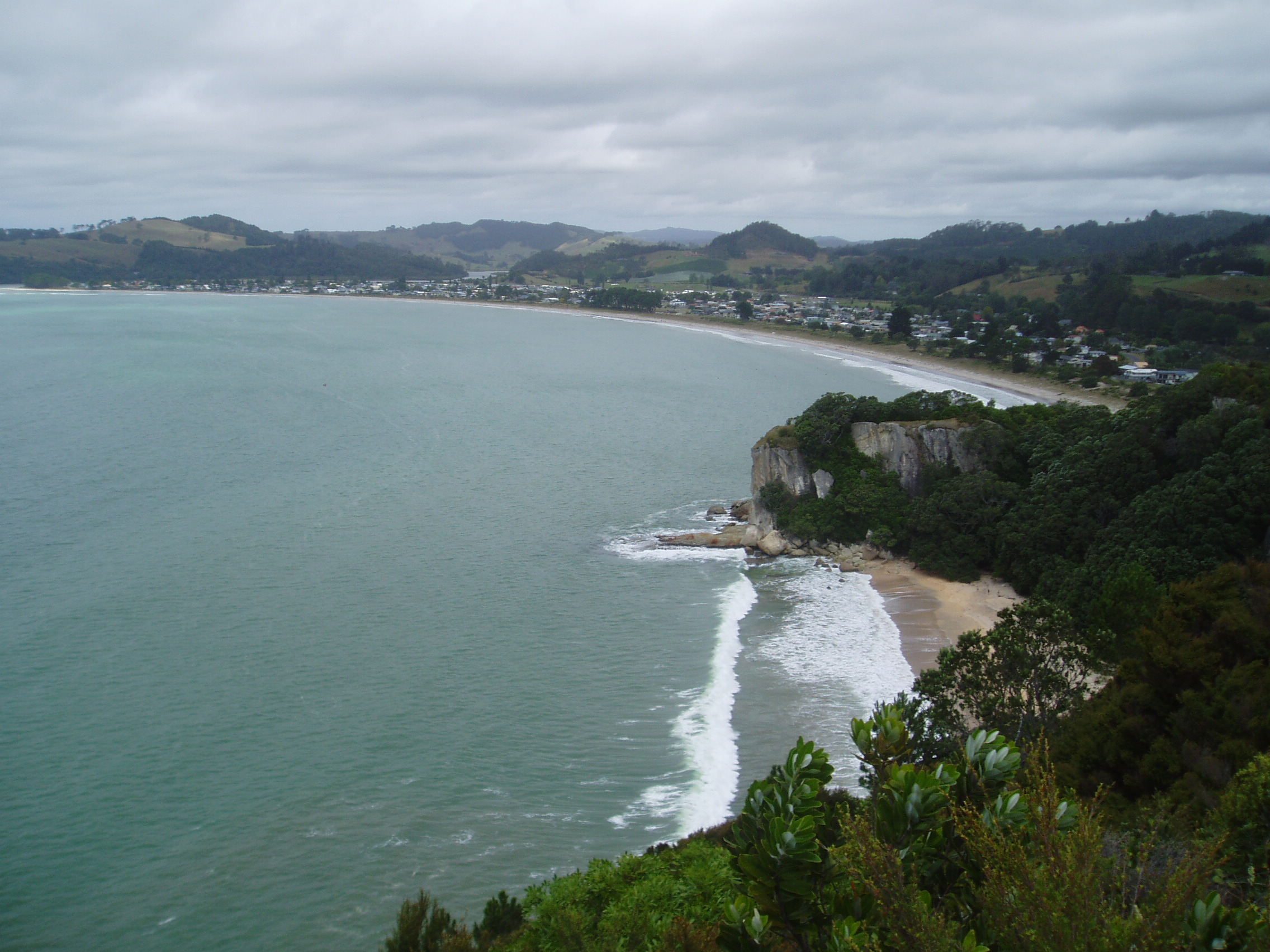
- Cooks Bay
- Interactive map of Cooks Beach (Pukaki)
- Coordinates: 36.838°S 175.739°E
- Country: New Zealand
- Region: Waikato
- District: Thames-Coromandel District
- Ward: Mercury Bay ward
- Community Board: Mercury Bay Community
- Electorates: Coromandel; Hauraki-Waikato (Māori)

Government
  - Council: Thames-Coromandel District Council
  - Regional council: Waikato Regional Council
  - Mayor of Thames-Coromandel: Peter Revell
  - Coromandel MP: Scott Simpson
  - Hauraki-Waikato MP: Hana-Rawhiti Maipi-Clarke

Area
  - Total: 2.69 km^{2} (1.04 sq mi)

Population (June 2025)
  - Total: 580
  - Density: 220/km^{2} (560/sq mi)

Cooks Beach (Pukaki) is a town on a three-kilometre white-sand beach on the Coromandel Peninsula of New Zealand. To its north is Cooks Bay, and beyond that is Mercury Bay. To the east is the locality of Hahei and the tourist attraction of Cathedral Cove. Roads to the south connect to SH 25. On the northwest, Shakespeare Cliff is a scenic reserve with a lookout point.

== History ==
The harbour is one of the earliest places settled by Māori, with Kupe landing on the shore in the fourteenth century. Te Arawa arrived later bringing a leader called Hei, resulting in the local iwi of Ngāti Hei. The bay was called Whanganui-o-hei, the great bay of Hei.

James Cook visited the area in November 1769, and chose the eastern end of Cooks Beach to set up his instruments to observe the transit of Mercury. He named the bay Mercury Bay. A granite monument later set up to honour him was washed into the sea by a storm and erosion in 2018, but replaced in time for the 250th anniversary the following year.

In 1837, Ranulph Dacre and Gordon Browne purchased almost all the land of Cooks Beach, which became known as Dacre's Grant. A timber mill and a flax mill were established, and up to 30 families settled to farm, collect kauri gum, and fish. Plans to subdivide the land in the 1920s were postponed due to the Great Depression until after World War II. Farming moved into the hills, which had previously been unsuitable due to low phosphate levels, but aerial topdressing made the land economic.

== Ferry Landing ==
About 2.5 km northwest of the centre of Cooks Beach is Ferry Landing, a smaller settlement on Whakapenui Point between Maramaratotara Bay and Whitianga Harbour. This was the site of a Ngāti Hei pā, which was sacked by Ngāi Te Rangi in the mid 18th century. Cook was impressed by the ruins when visited on 11 November 1769.

A passenger ferry runs on a ten-minute schedule between Ferry Landing and Whitianga during the day. The ferry has operated since 1895.

== Demographics ==
Stats NZ describes Cooks Beach-Ferry Landing as a rural settlement, which covers 2.69 km^{2} (1.04 sq mi). It had an estimated population of 580 as of June 2025, with a population density of 216 people per km^{2}.

Historical population
Year	Pop.	±% p.a.
2006	315	—
2013	348	+1.43%
2018	459	+5.69%
2023	555	+3.87%

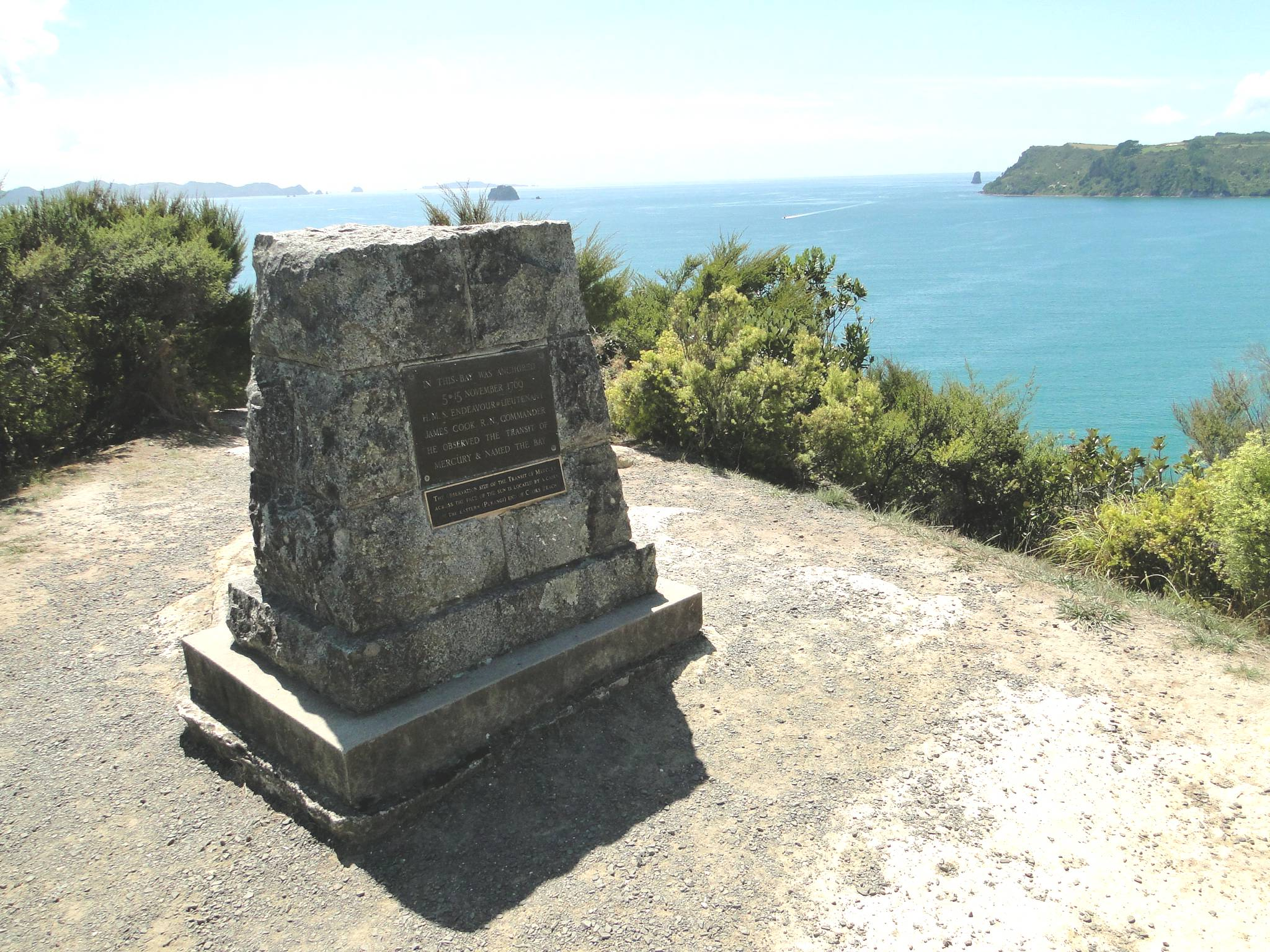
A cairn on Shakespeare Cliff commemorating Cook's observation of the transit of Mercury

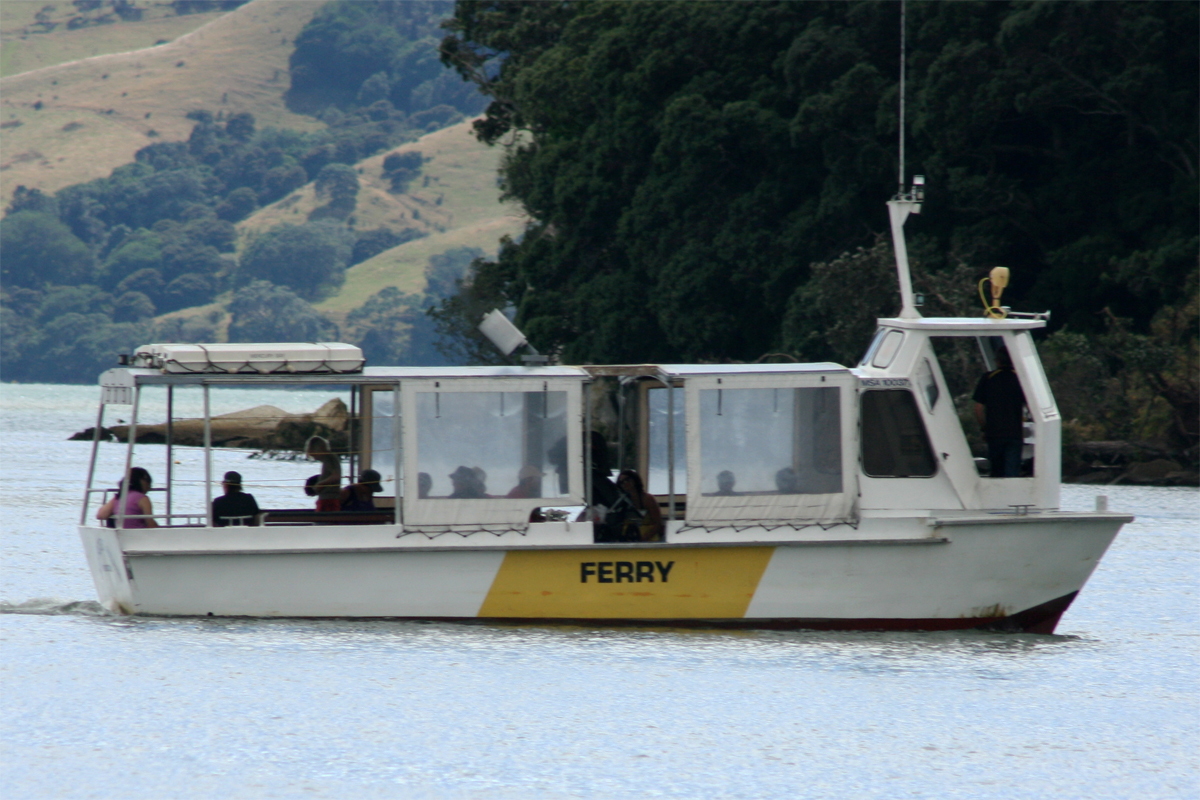
A Whitianga ferry

Cooks Beach-Ferry Landing had a population of 555 in the 2023 New Zealand census, an increase of 96 people (20.9%) since the 2018 census, and an increase of 207 people (59.5%) since the 2013 census. There were 279 males, 276 females and 3 people of other genders in 276 dwellings. 1.6% of people identified as LGBTIQ+. The median age was 59.0 years (compared with 38.1 years nationally). There were 69 people (12.4%) aged under 15 years, 39 (7.0%) aged 15 to 29, 246 (44.3%) aged 30 to 64, and 204 (36.8%) aged 65 or older.

People could identify as more than one ethnicity. The results were 94.1% European (Pākehā); 11.4% Māori; 2.2% Pasifika; 2.2% Asian; 0.5% Middle Eastern, Latin American and African New Zealanders (MELAA); and 3.8% other, which includes people giving their ethnicity as "New Zealander". English was spoken by 98.9%, Māori language by 1.1%, and other languages by 4.3%. No language could be spoken by 0.5% (e.g. too young to talk). The percentage of people born overseas was 17.8, compared with 28.8% nationally.

Religious affiliations were 29.7% Christian, 0.5% Islam, 0.5% Māori religious beliefs, 0.5% New Age, and 1.1% other religions. People who answered that they had no religion were 59.5%, and 7.6% of people did not answer the census question.

Of those at least 15 years old, 108 (22.2%) people had a bachelor's or higher degree, 285 (58.6%) had a post-high school certificate or diploma, and 99 (20.4%) people exclusively held high school qualifications. The median income was $33,300, compared with $41,500 nationally. 36 people (7.4%) earned over $100,000 compared to 12.1% nationally. The employment status of those at least 15 was that 174 (35.8%) people were employed full-time, 96 (19.8%) were part-time, and 12 (2.5%) were unemployed.
