= Mahurangi Island (Goat Island) =

Island in New Zealand

Mahurangi (Māori)
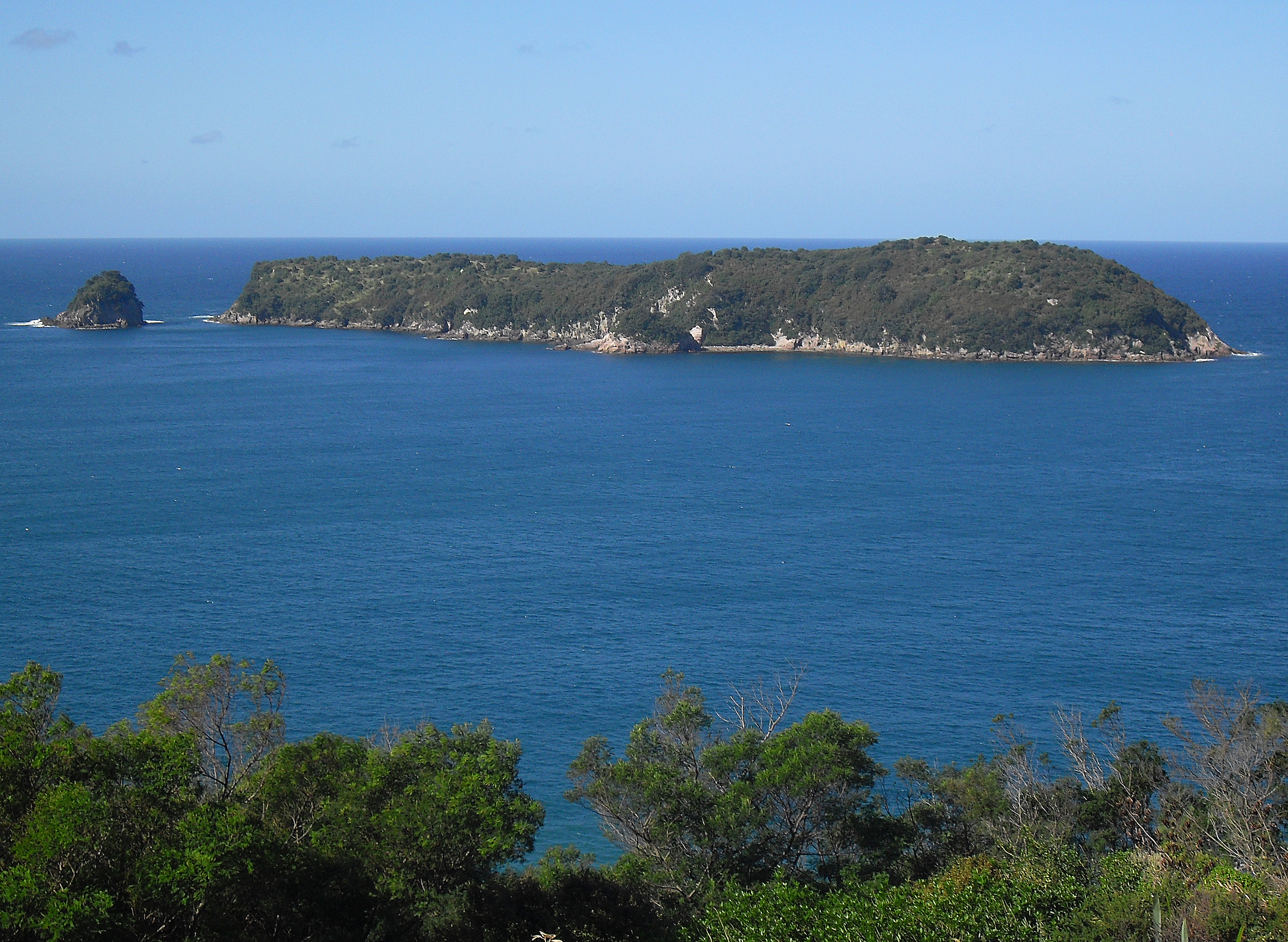
- Mahurangi Island including Okorotere Island (left)
- Interactive map of Mahurangi Island (Goat Island)

Geography
- Location: Waikato region
- Coordinates: 36°49′49″S 175°49′12″E
- Area: 0.06 km^{2} (0.023 sq mi)
- Length: 1 km (0.6 mi)
- Width: .35 km (0.217 mi)
- Highest point: 80

Administration
- New Zealand

Demographics
- Population: 0

Mahurangi Island, also known as Goat Island, is located 1.1 kilometres (0.68 mi) to the north-east of Hahei on the Coromandel Peninsula in New Zealand's North Island. The uninhabited island is 6 hectares in size.

Mahurangi Island forms one corner of the Te Whanganui-A-Hei (Cathedral Cove) Marine Reserve.

Nearby are many smaller islands including Okorotere and Te Tio Islands.

== See also ==
- Motueka Island (Pigeon Island)
- New Zealand outlying islands
- List of islands of New Zealand
- List of islands
- Desert island
