= Square Kauri =

Ancient tree on the Coromandel Peninsula, New Zealand

Coordinates: 36°59′25″S 175°34′22″E

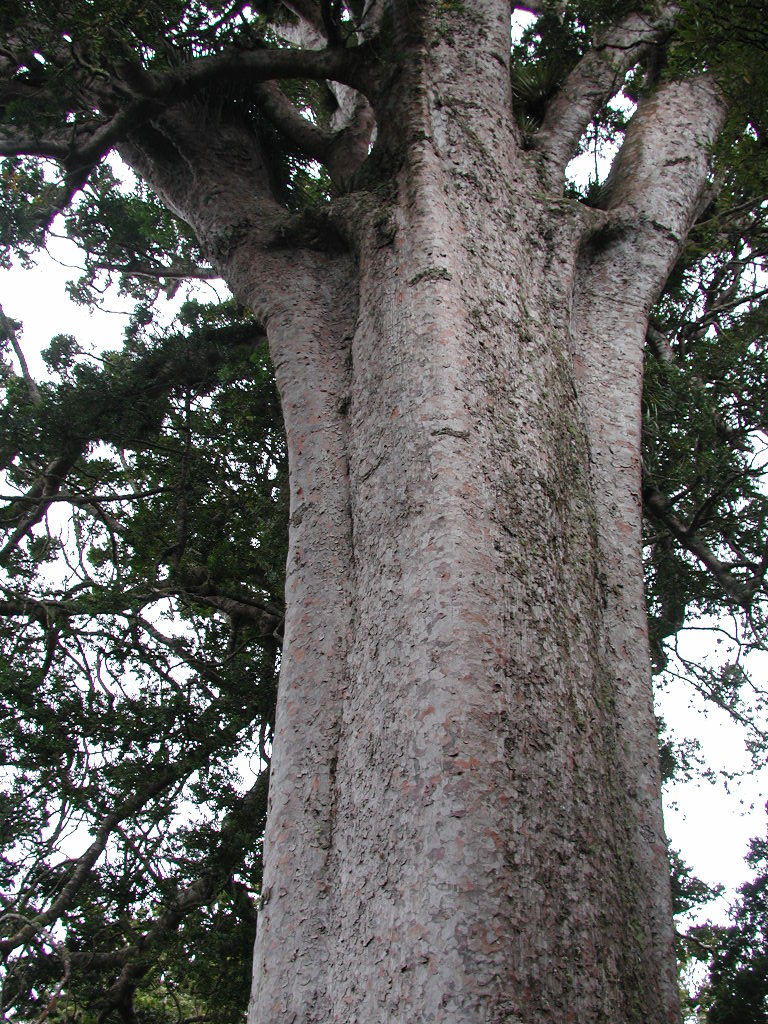
Square Kauri

The Square Kauri is an estimated 1,200 year old kauri tree (Agathis australis) in the Coromandel Range on the Coromandel Peninsula, New Zealand. It is the 15th largest kauri on the peninsula.

The Square Kauri is a popular stop along the "Tapu-Coroglen Road", as it is only a short walk from the road. Its unusual square-looking trunk spared it from felling when most of the large kauri trees in the area were logged during the late 19th century.

== Measurements ==
Trunk girth	8.76 m (28.7 ft)
Clean bole	12.8 m (42 ft)
Trunk volume	69.8 m^{3} (2,460 ft^{3})

All the measurements above were taken in 1975.
