= Motueka Island (Pigeon Island) =

Island in New Zealand

Native name: Te Kuraetanga o taku Ihu
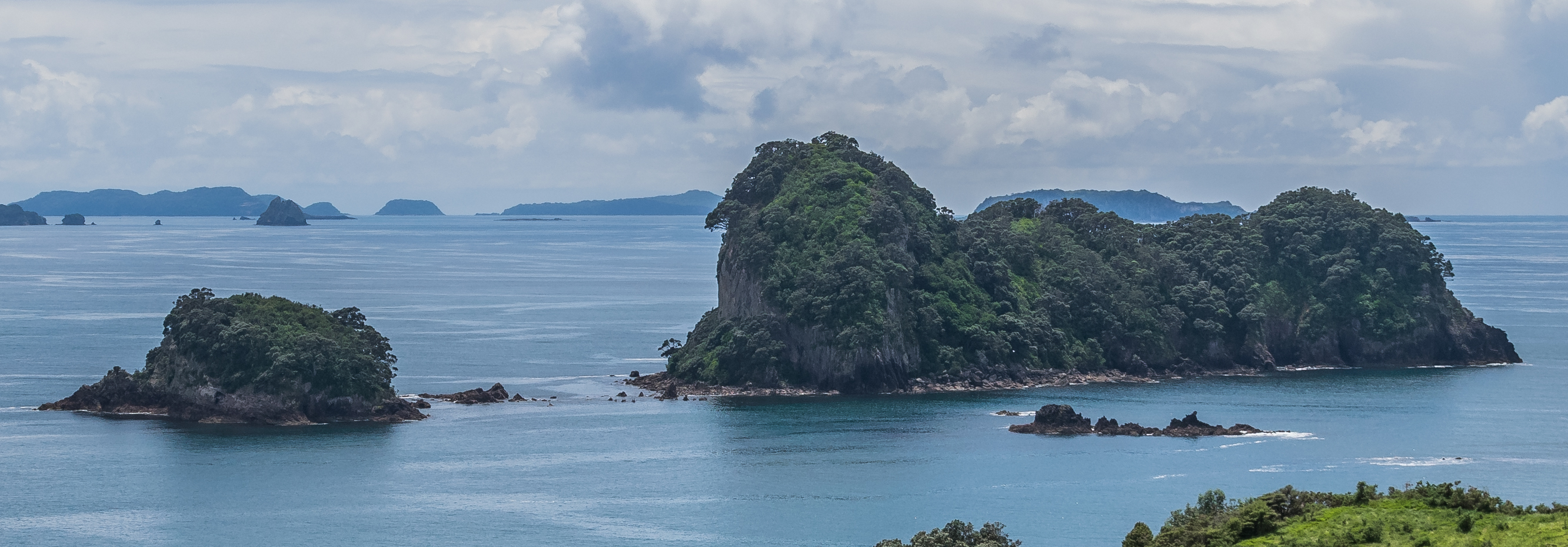
- Motueka Island seen from the Coromandel Peninsula, adjacent to Poikeke Island to the left
- Interactive map of Motueka Island (Pigeon Island)

Geography
- Location: Coromandel Peninsula
- Coordinates: 36°49′08″S 175°48′04″E
- Adjacent to: Pacific Ocean
- Area: 68 m^{2} (730 sq ft)
- Length: 475 m (1558 ft)
- Width: 205 m (673 ft)
- Highest elevation: 66 m (217 ft)

Administration
- New Zealand

Motueka Island, also known by the name Pigeon Island, is an island off the coast of the Coromandel Peninsula in New Zealand.

== Geography ==
The island is located 1.5 kilometres north-east of Cathedral Cove, to the east of Mercury Bay. It is tidally linked to Poikeke Island, a smaller island located to the west. The island reaches a height of 66 metres (217 ft). Motueka Island is within the Te Whanganui-A-Hei (Cathedral Cove) Marine Reserve.

Motueka Island is an eroded Miocene era lava dome, composed of flow-banded rhyolite.

== Biodiversity ==
The island is primarily forested by native New Zealand flora, including kohekohe, karaka, māhoe, whārangi, tawāpou, pūriri and parapara. The summit area is a plateau, forested by large pōhutukawa trees.

The island is a nesting place for Pterodroma gouldi (ōi / the grey-faced petrel). Several hundred birds nest on the island, despite the presence of Norway rats.

== History ==
The island is historically significant to Ngāti Hei, who are the mana whenua iwi for Mouteka Island. It was given the traditional name Te Kuraetanga o taku Ihu, named by the rangatira Hei, who likened the island to his tā moko. During the early European colonial period, the island gained the name Pigeon Island.
