= Purangi River =

River in North Island, New Zealand

Coordinates: 36°52′S 175°45′E

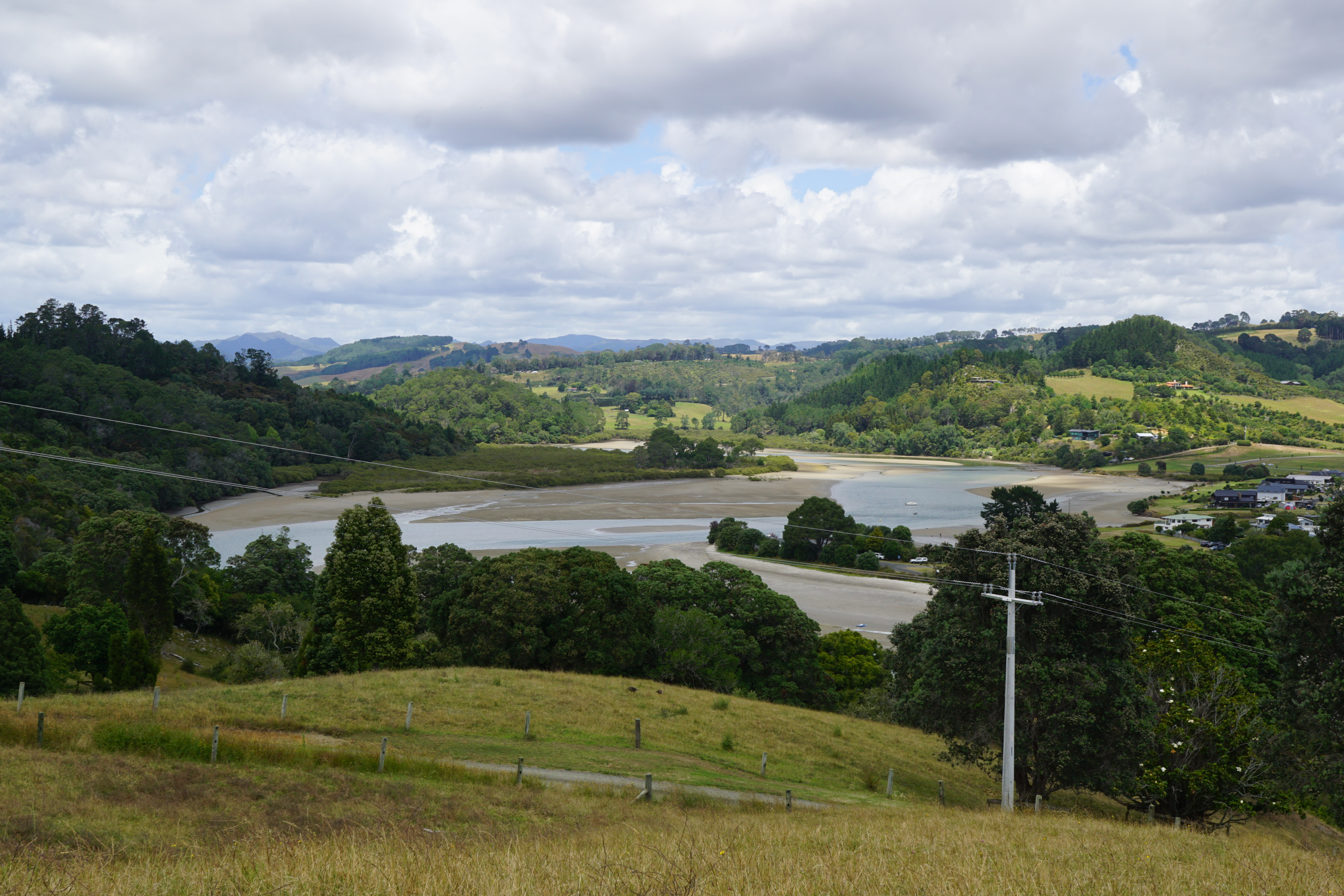
- Purangi Estuary, as seen from Stella Evered Memorial Park Reserve.

Location
- Country: New Zealand

Physical characteristics
- Mouth
  - location: Mercury Bay

The Purangi River is a river of the Coromandel Peninsula in New Zealand's North Island. It flows north to reach Mercury Bay to the east of Whitianga.

== See also ==
- List of rivers of New Zealand
