= Tapu, New Zealand =

Rural settlement in New Zealand

Tapu
- Coordinates: 36°59′0″S 175°30′6″E
- Country: New Zealand
- Region: Waikato
- District: Thames-Coromandel District
- Ward: Thames ward
- Community Board: Thames Community
- Electorates: Coromandel; Hauraki-Waikato (Māori)

Government
  - Council: Thames-Coromandel District Council
  - Regional council: Waikato Regional Council
  - Mayor of Thames-Coromandel: Peter Revell
  - Coromandel MP: Scott Simpson
  - Hauraki-Waikato MP: Hana-Rawhiti Maipi-Clarke

Area
  - Total: 4.21 km^{2} (1.63 sq mi)

Population (June 2025)
  - Total: 290
  - Density: 69/km^{2} (180/sq mi)

Tapu is a locality on the western side of the Coromandel Peninsula of New Zealand. State Highway 25 runs through it. Coromandel is 35 km to the north, and Thames is 19 km to the south. The Tapu River flows from the Coromandel Range past the settlement and into the Firth of Thames to the west.

The "Tapu-Coroglen Road", a windy gravel road, connects it across the Coromandel Range with Coroglen in the east. The Square Kauri is on this road.

== Demographics ==
Tapu is described by Statistics New Zealand as a rural settlement. It covers 4.21 km^{2} (1.63 sq mi) and had an estimated population of 290 as of June 2025, with a population density of 69 people per km^{2}. Tapu is part of the larger Thames Coast statistical area.

Historical population
Year	Pop.	±% p.a.
2006	267	—
2013	210	−3.37%
2018	249	+3.47%
2023	303	+4.00%

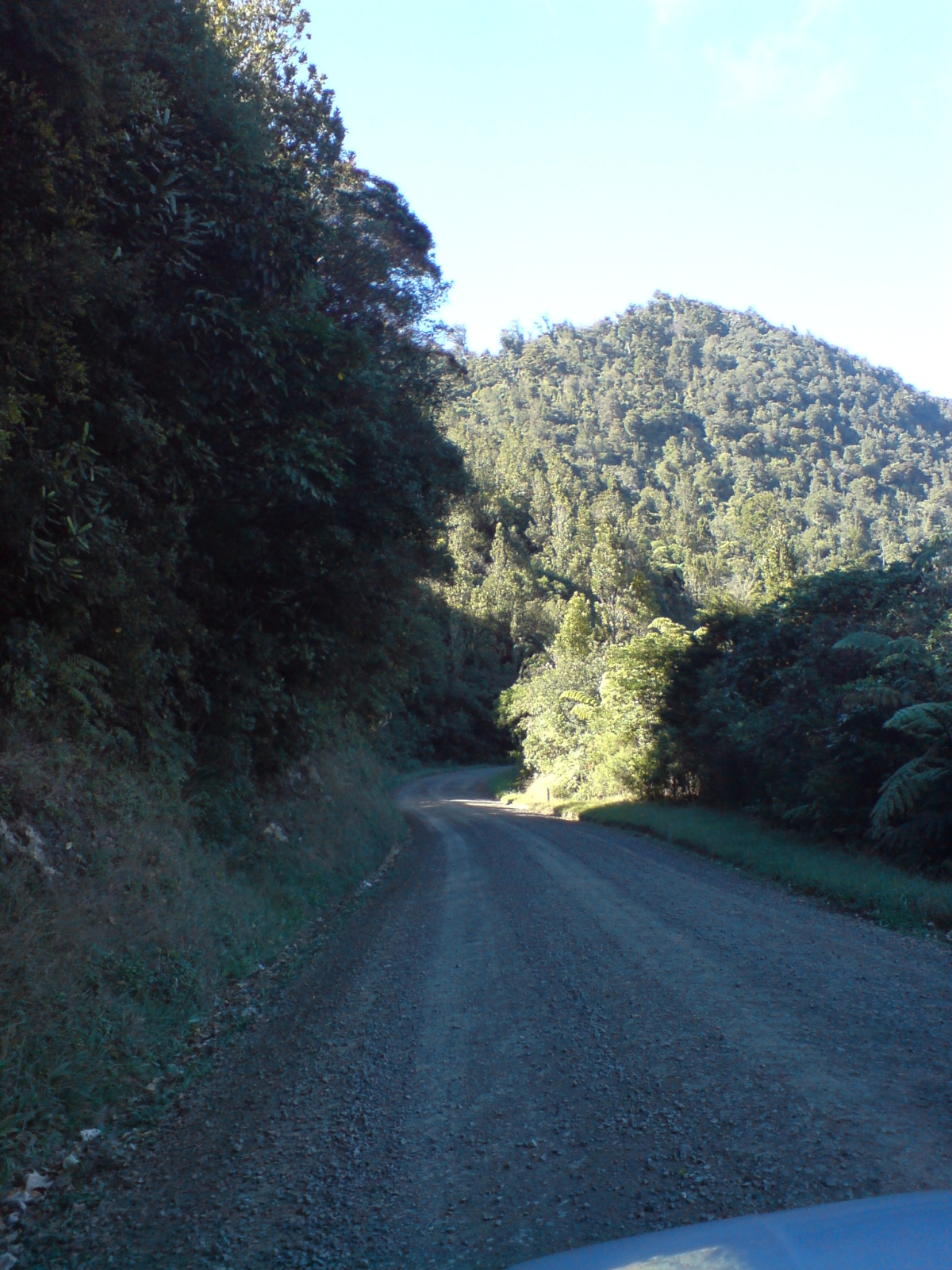
Tapu-Coroglen Road

Tapu had a population of 303 in the 2023 New Zealand census, an increase of 54 people (21.7%) since the 2018 census, and an increase of 93 people (44.3%) since the 2013 census. There were 153 males, 150 females and 3 people of other genders in 111 dwellings. 2.0% of people identified as LGBTIQ+. The median age was 64.4 years (compared with 38.1 years nationally). There were 12 people (4.0%) aged under 15 years, 21 (6.9%) aged 15 to 29, 123 (40.6%) aged 30 to 64, and 144 (47.5%) aged 65 or older.

People could identify as more than one ethnicity. The results were 90.1% European (Pākehā), 15.8% Māori, 1.0% Pasifika, 1.0% Asian, and 5.9% other, which includes people giving their ethnicity as "New Zealander". English was spoken by 99.0%, Māori language by 3.0%, and other languages by 5.9%. The percentage of people born overseas was 11.9, compared with 28.8% nationally.

Religious affiliations were 29.7% Christian, 1.0% Māori religious beliefs, 1.0% Buddhist, 1.0% New Age, and 1.0% other religions. People who answered that they had no religion were 56.4%, and 10.9% of people did not answer the census question.

Of those at least 15 years old, 39 (13.4%) people had a bachelor's or higher degree, 156 (53.6%) had a post-high school certificate or diploma, and 93 (32.0%) people exclusively held high school qualifications. The median income was $27,200, compared with $41,500 nationally. 9 people (3.1%) earned over $100,000 compared to 12.1% nationally. The employment status of those at least 15 was that 81 (27.8%) people were employed full-time, 45 (15.5%) were part-time, and 6 (2.1%) were unemployed.

== Education ==
Tapu School is a coeducational full primary (years 1–8) school with a decile rating of 4 and a roll of 28.
