= Hot Water Beach =

Beach in New Zealand

Coordinates: 36°52.9′S 175°49.2′E

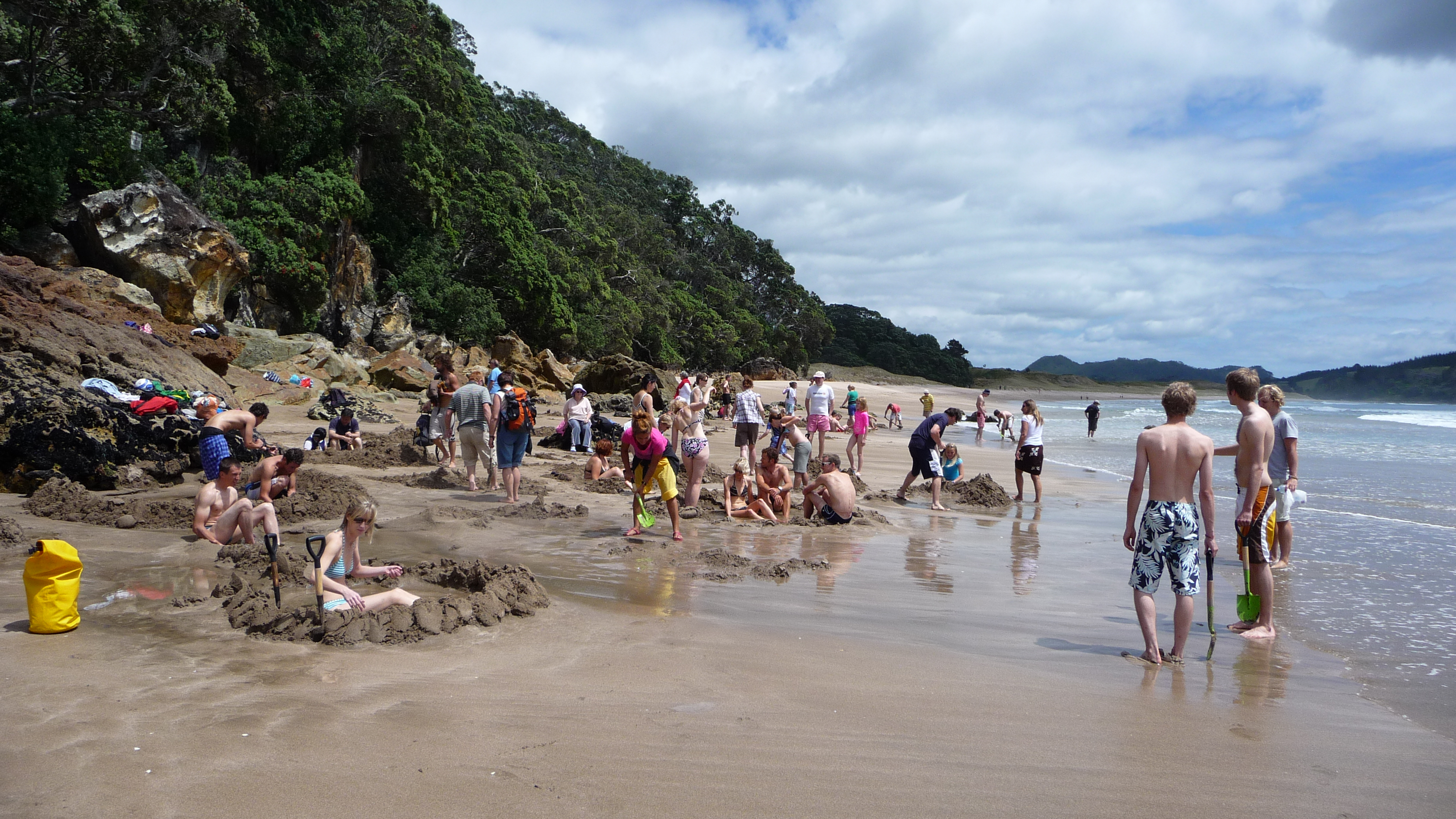
Visitors making small pools by excavating sand

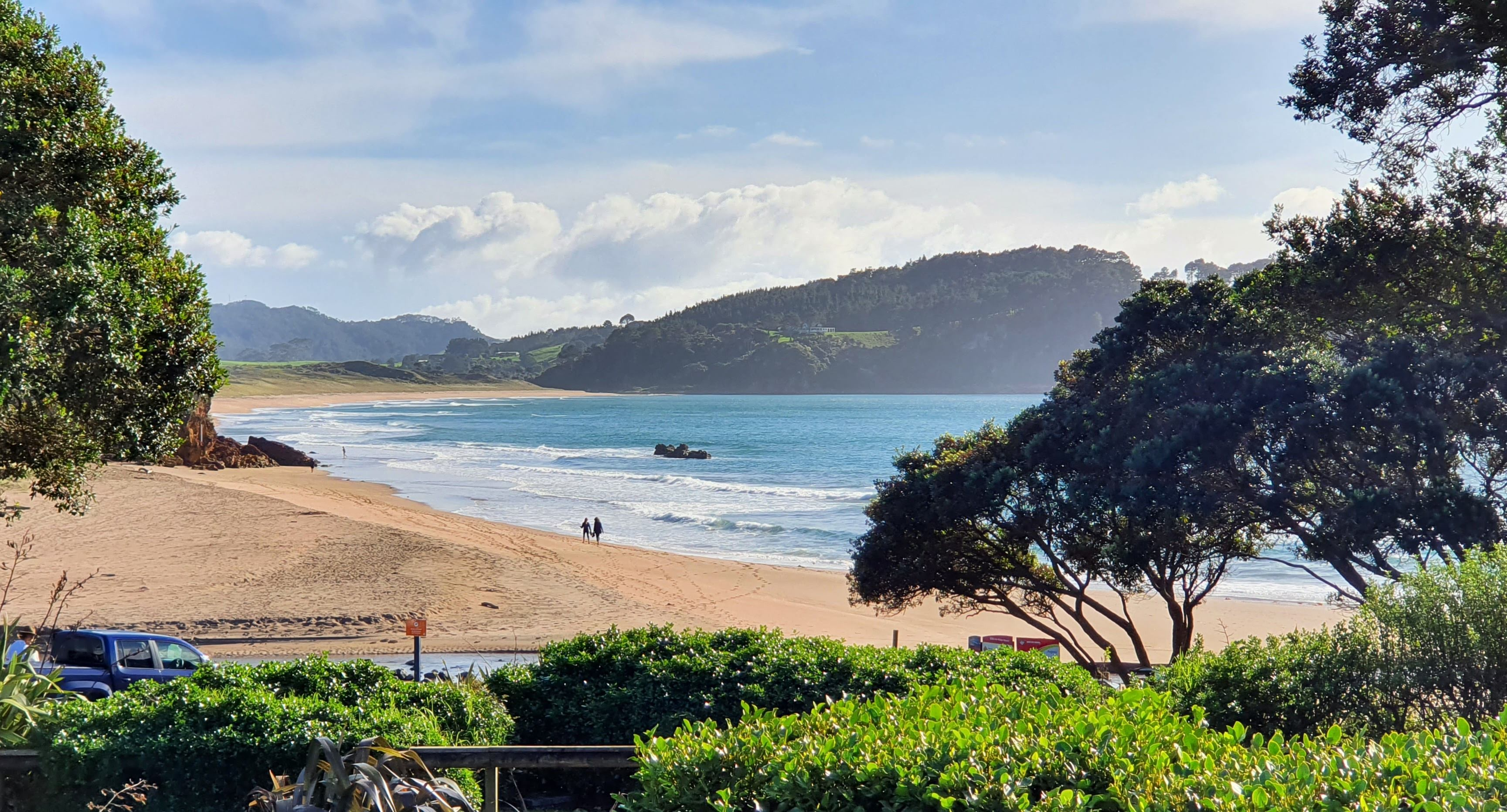
Looking northwards along Hot Water Beach in early winter

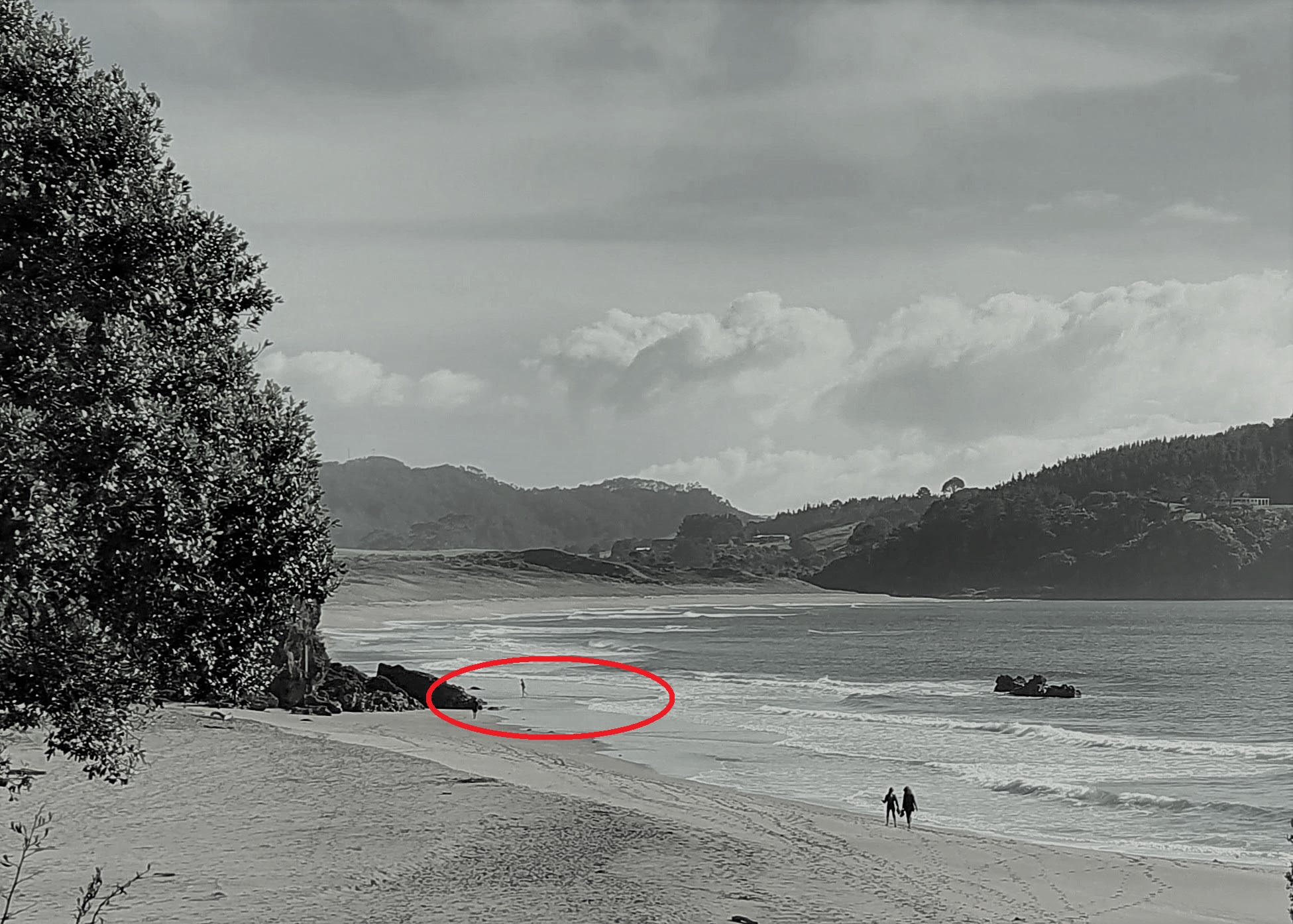
The location of the hot springs on Hot Water Beach in Coromandel

Hot Water Beach is a beach on the east coast of the Coromandel Peninsula, New Zealand, just south of Mercury Bay. It is approximately 12 kilometres south east of Whitianga, and approximately 175 kilometres from Auckland by car. Its name comes from underground hot springs that filter up through the sand between the high and low water tidal reaches. The beach is a popular destination both for locals and tourists. Annual visitor numbers have been estimated at 700,000, making it one of the most popular geothermal attractions in the Waikato region.

== Hot water springs ==
Within two hours either side of low tide, it is possible to dig into the sand allowing hot water to escape to the surface forming a hot water pool. The water, with a temperature as hot as 64 °C (147 °F), filters up from two underground fissures located close to each other. These natural springs can be found on the beach opposite the off-shore rocks. Visitors often dig large holes and relax and soak in the thermal water. Many visitors bring a spade and bucket with them. Spades can also be hired from the nearby surf shop.

== Safety ==
Care needs to be exercised as the location of the hot springs are not far from the sea even at low tide, and visitors may be caught unaware by the large breaking waves. Hot Water Beach is known for its dangerous rip currents, holes and large waves. Signs at the beach advise swimmers not to swim within 50 m either side of the off-shore rocks (opposite the springs), and to only swim between the flags of the Hot Water Beach Lifeguard Service. Hot Water Beach's rip currents have claimed the lives of several unwary visitors and only strong and experienced swimmers are advised to enter the water.
