= Whanganui A Hei (Cathedral Cove) Marine Reserve =

Beach and marine reserve in New Zealand

Te Whanganui-o-Hei (Cathedral Cove) Marine Reserve
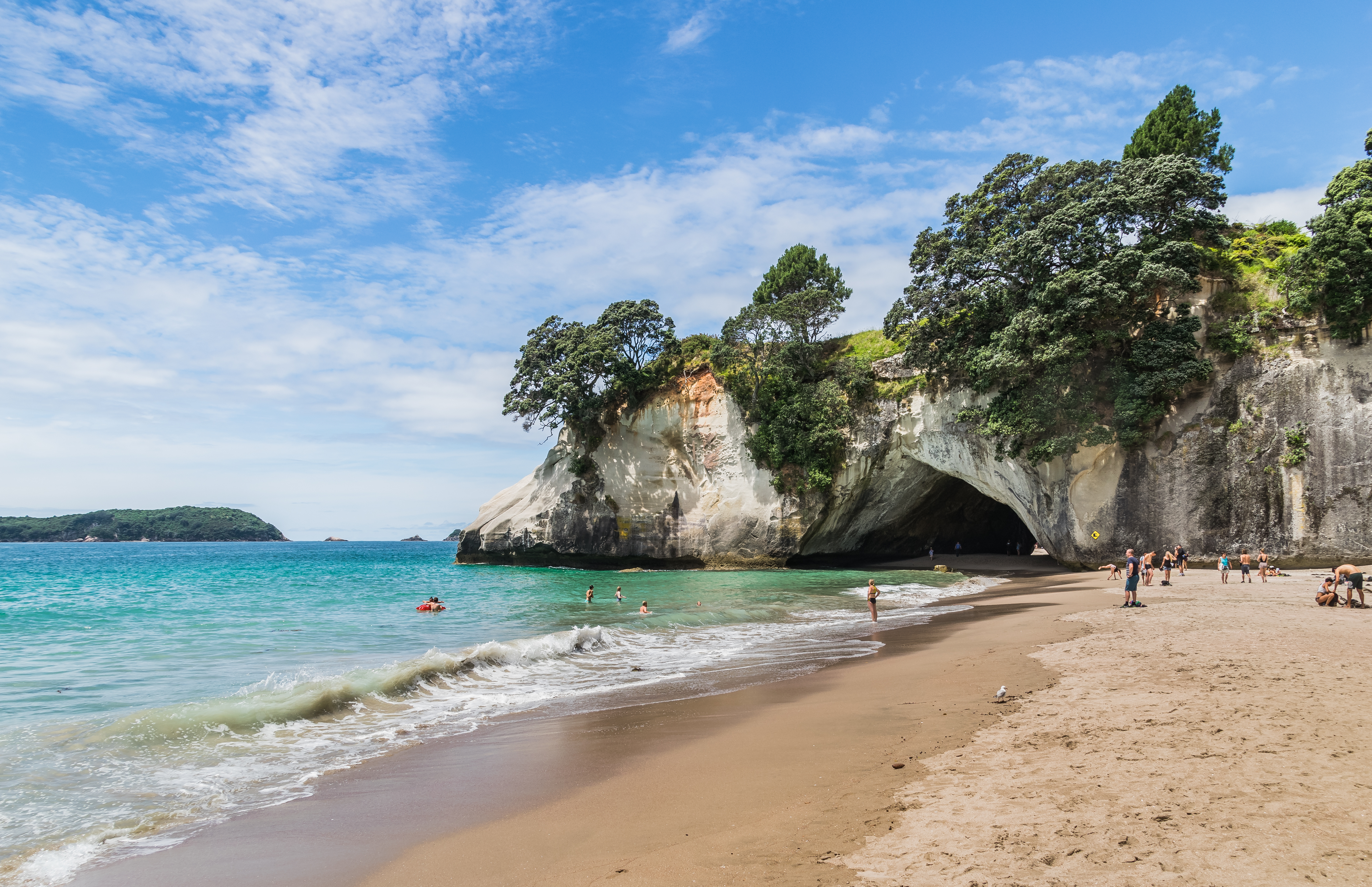
- Cathedral Cove in 2019

- Location within New Zealand
- Location: New Zealand
- Coordinates: 36°49′42″S 175°47′24″E
- Area: 840 ha (2,100 acres)
- Established: 1992
- Governing body: Department of Conservation

Te Whanganui-o-Hei (Cathedral Cove) Marine Reserve is in the southern part of Mercury Bay on the Coromandel Peninsula in New Zealand covering an area of 840 hectares (2,100 acres). On the coast of the mainland, it stretches from Cook Bluff in the north-west to the northern end of Hahei Beach in the south-east. Its offshore extremes run from Motukorure Island through Waikaranga Island to Okorotere Island and the northern end of Mahurangi Island (Goat Island).

Part of the marine reserve lies off the Cathedral Cove Recreation Reserve, which runs from the northern end of Hahei Beach in the south-east to beyond Cathedral Cove in the north-west. With attractions such as a natural rock archway and neighbouring beaches at Cathedral Cove, the area is very popular with tourists, and receives around 150,000 visitors per year.

The walkway to the cove was closed due to damage from Cyclone Gabrielle in February 2023. In January 2024, the Department of Conservation said they were "not confident" the track would reopen due to significant damage to the stability of the ground in the area. An alternative viewing point was established, and the cove could be viewed from boats. The Mautohe Cathedral Cove Track reopened on 1 December 2024. The track from Hahei Beach to the Grange Road track entrance (Hahei Beach Walk) is closed due to land instability.

Cathedral Cove will become one of four natural attractions that will start charging entry fees for foreign tourists. Under the proposed scheme, foreign visitors will be required to pay between NZ$20 (€10) and NZ$40 (€20) to access the natural landmarks, generating up to €32 million to invest in natural sites.

== Etymology ==
The Māori name for Mercury Bay, Te Whanganui-o-Hei (meaning the Great Bay of Hei), refers to Hei, a tohunga from the Te Arawa waka. According to tradition, Hei chose the area around Mercury Bay as home for his tribe, proclaiming ownership by calling Motueka Island "Te Kuraetanga-o-taku-Ihu" (the outward curve of my nose). It is said he made this claim near the present-day town of Hahei.

== In popular culture ==
The cave and beach were used as the tunnel through which the Pevensie children first re-enter Narnia in the movie version of The Chronicles of Narnia: Prince Caspian (2008). The cove was used as one of the locations in the music video for the song "Can't Hold Us" (2011) by Macklemore and Ryan Lewis featuring Ray Dalton.

== Gallery ==
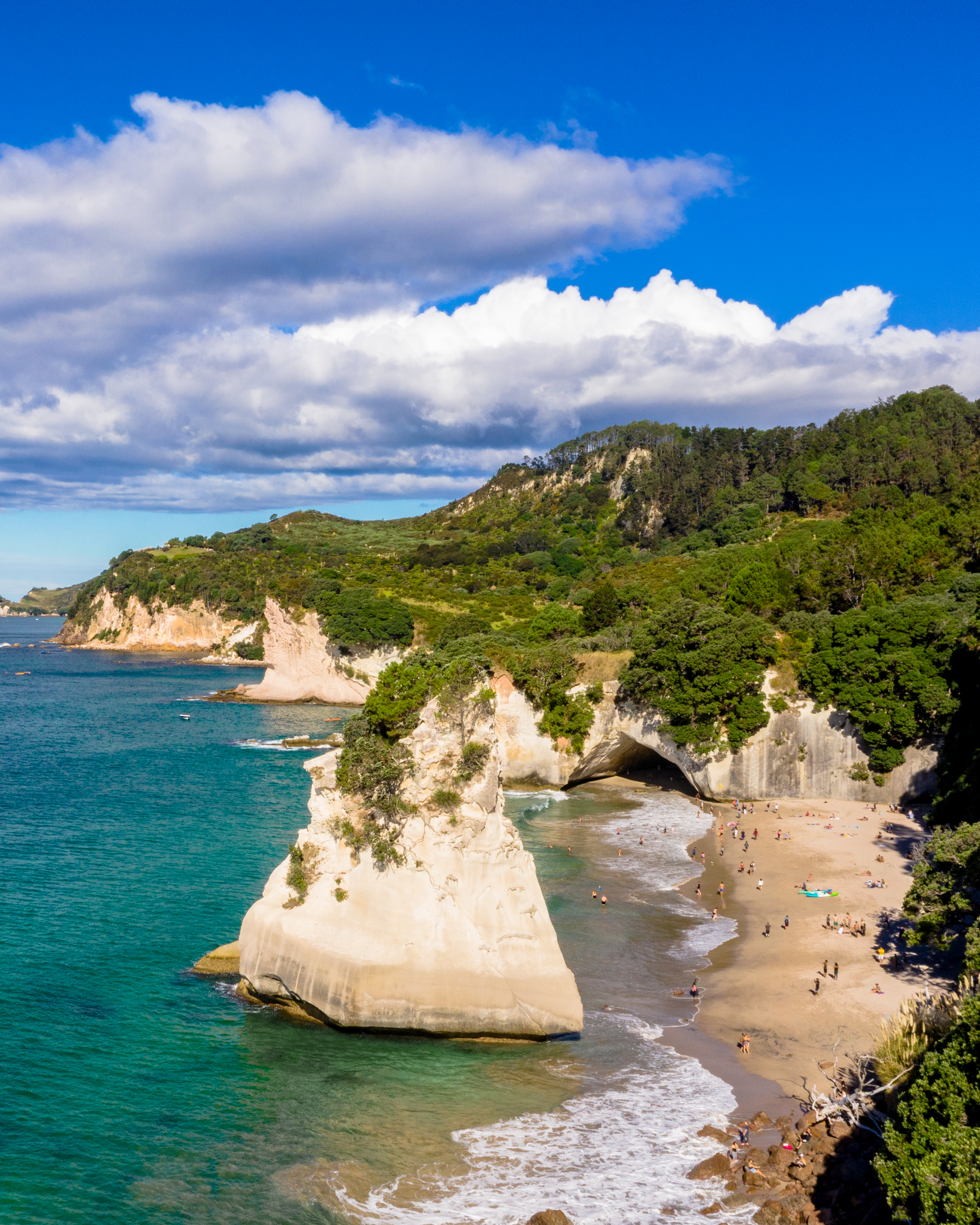
Cathedral Cove in 2019

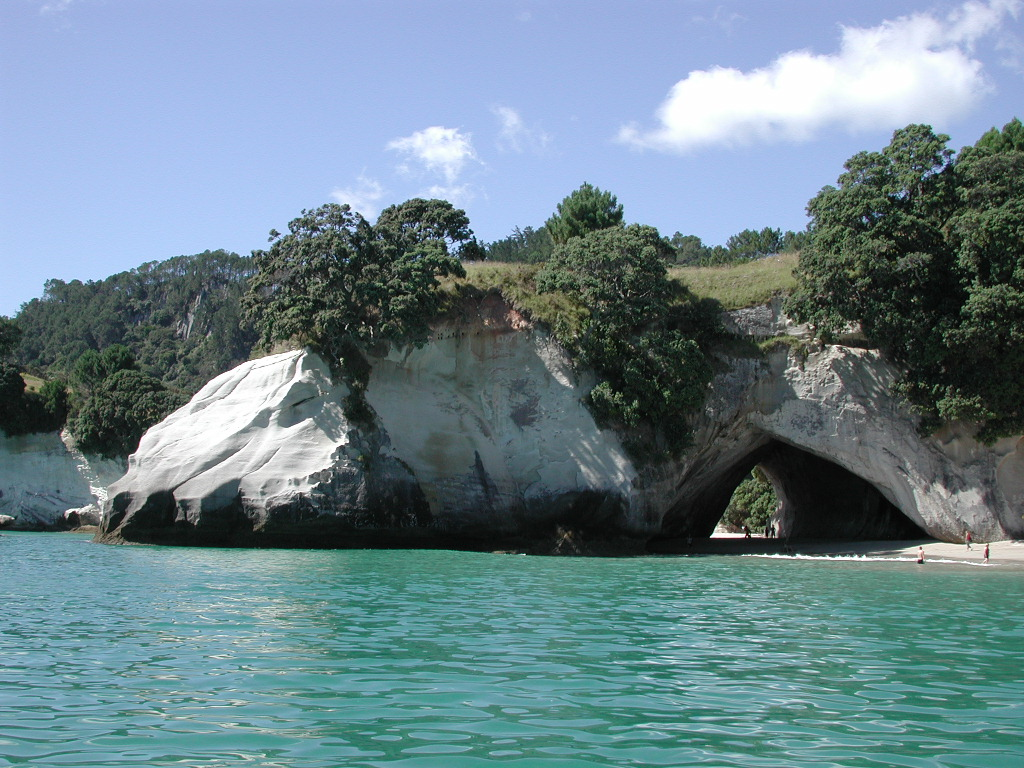
View towards Cathedral Cove from the sea

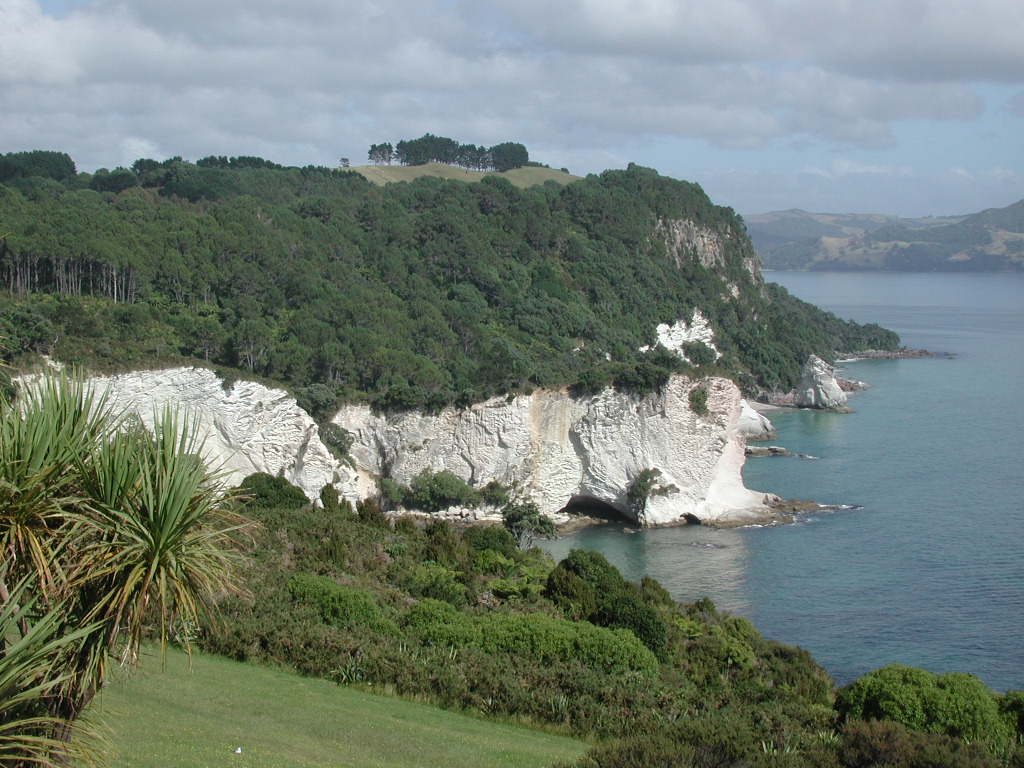
View from lookout near car park over Stingray Bay to Cathedral Cove

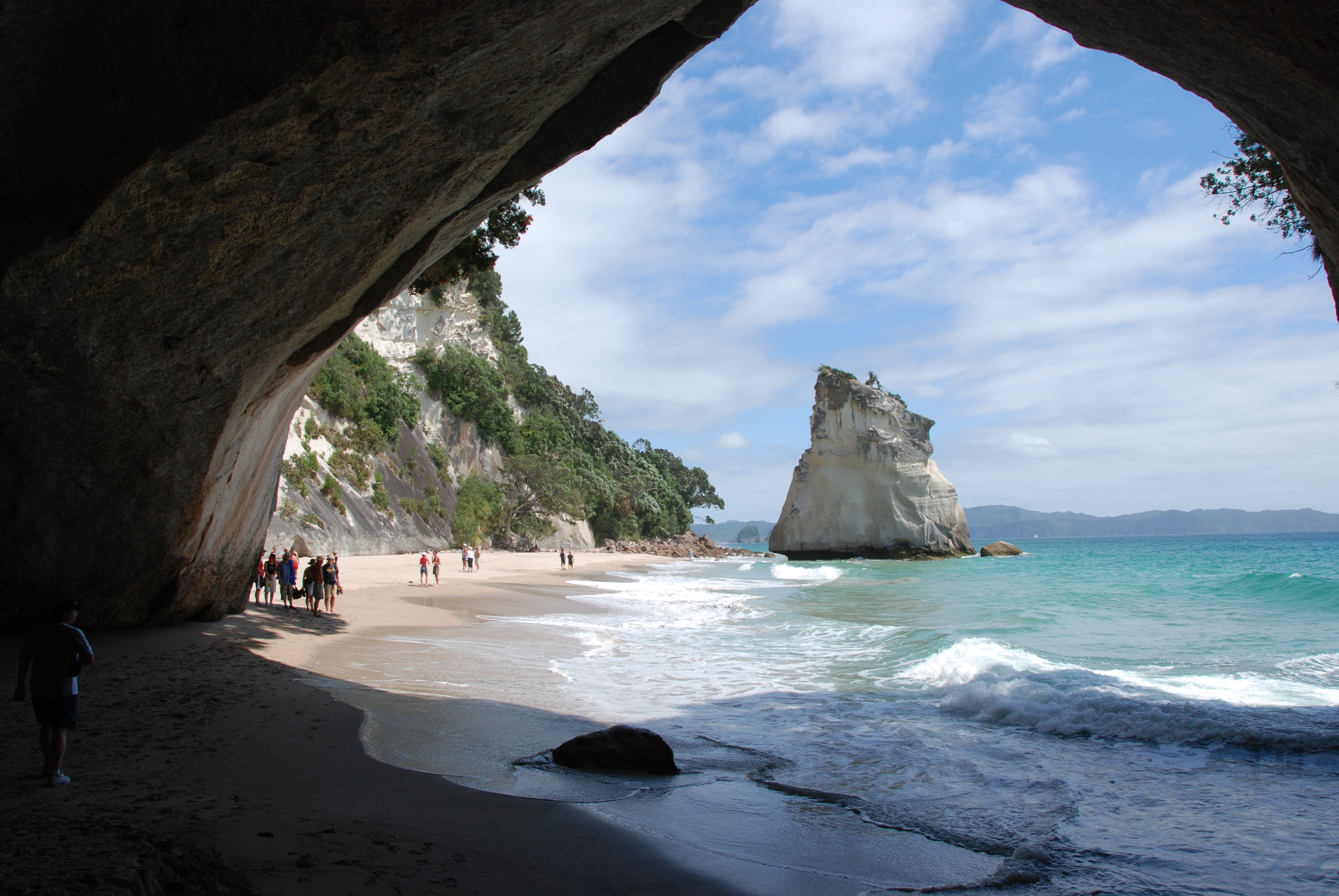
View through rock arch towards Te Hoho Rock in Cathedral Cove

== See also ==
- Marine reserves of New Zealand
