= Coroglen =

Coroglen Ōunuora (Māori)
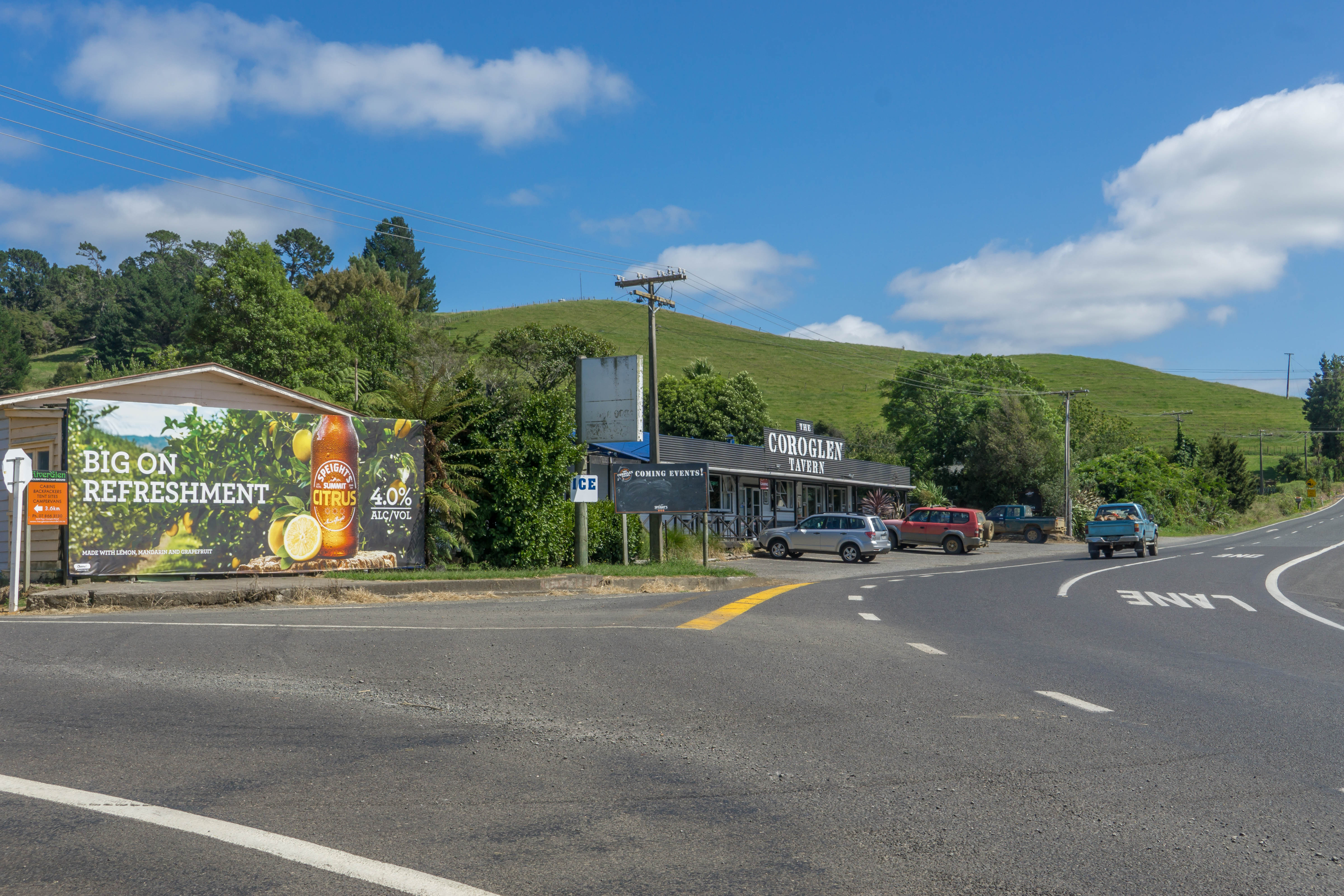
- The Coroglen Tavern
- Interactive map of Coroglen
- Coordinates: 36°55′26″S 175°41′31″E
- Country: New Zealand
- Region: Waikato
- District: Thames-Coromandel District
- Ward: Mercury Bay ward
- Community Board: Mercury Bay Community
- Electorates: Coromandel; Hauraki-Waikato (Māori)

Government
  - Council: Thames-Coromandel District Council
  - Regional council: Waikato Regional Council
  - Mayor of Thames-Coromandel: Peter Revell
  - Coromandel MP: Scott Simpson
  - Hauraki-Waikato MP: Hana-Rawhiti Maipi-Clarke

Area
  - Total: 21.92 km^{2} (8.46 sq mi)

Population (2023 Census)
  - Total: 135
  - Density: 6.16/km^{2} (16.0/sq mi)
- Postcode: 3591

Coroglen (Māori: Ōunuora) is a locality in the Coromandel Peninsula, New Zealand. It lies on State Highway 25, 18 kilometres south of Whitianga and 26 kilometres north west of Tairua. The "Tapu-Coroglen Road", a windy gravel road, connects it across the Coromandel Range with Tapu on the west coast of the peninsula.

== History ==
The town was founded as "Gumtown" in the late 19th century with a kauri sawmill, later becoming an important location in the kauri gum trade. In the early 1900s, Gumtown had three stores, a bakery, a butcher's, a bootmaker, a blacksmith, a hotel, two boarding houses, and a billiard saloon. Current amenities include a tavern, school, pre school and a community garden.

== Demographics ==
Coroglen is in an SA1 statistical area which covers 21.92 km^{2} (8.46 sq mi). The SA1 area is part of the larger Mercury Bay South statistical area.

Historical population for Coroglen and surrounds
Year	Pop.	±% p.a.
2006	111	—
2013	126	+1.83%
2018	129	+0.47%
2023	135	+0.91%

The SA1 area had a population of 135 in the 2023 New Zealand census, an increase of 6 people (4.7%) since the 2018 census, and an increase of 9 people (7.1%) since the 2013 census. There were 63 males and 75 females in 48 dwellings. 2.2% of people identified as LGBTIQ+. The median age was 46.6 years (compared with 38.1 years nationally). There were 21 people (15.6%) aged under 15 years, 27 (20.0%) aged 15 to 29, 57 (42.2%) aged 30 to 64, and 33 (24.4%) aged 65 or older.

People could identify as more than one ethnicity. The results were 88.9% European (Pākehā), 17.8% Māori, and 2.2% other, which includes people giving their ethnicity as "New Zealander". English was spoken by 100.0%, Māori language by 4.4%, and other languages by 6.7%. The percentage of people born overseas was 11.1, compared with 28.8% nationally.

The only religious affiliation given was 20.0% Christian. People who answered that they had no religion were 71.1%, and 8.9% of people did not answer the census question.

Of those at least 15 years old, 9 (7.9%) people had a bachelor's or higher degree, 78 (68.4%) had a post-high school certificate or diploma, and 30 (26.3%) people exclusively held high school qualifications. The median income was $32,200, compared with $41,500 nationally. 3 people (2.6%) earned over $100,000 compared to 12.1% nationally. The employment status of those at least 15 was that 51 (44.7%) people were employed full-time and 24 (21.1%) were part-time.

== Education ==
Coroglen School is a co-educational full primary (years 1–8) school with a roll of 91 as of July 2026. The school started in 1896.
