= Mercury Bay =

Bay in New Zealand

Coordinates: 36.78°S 175.78°E

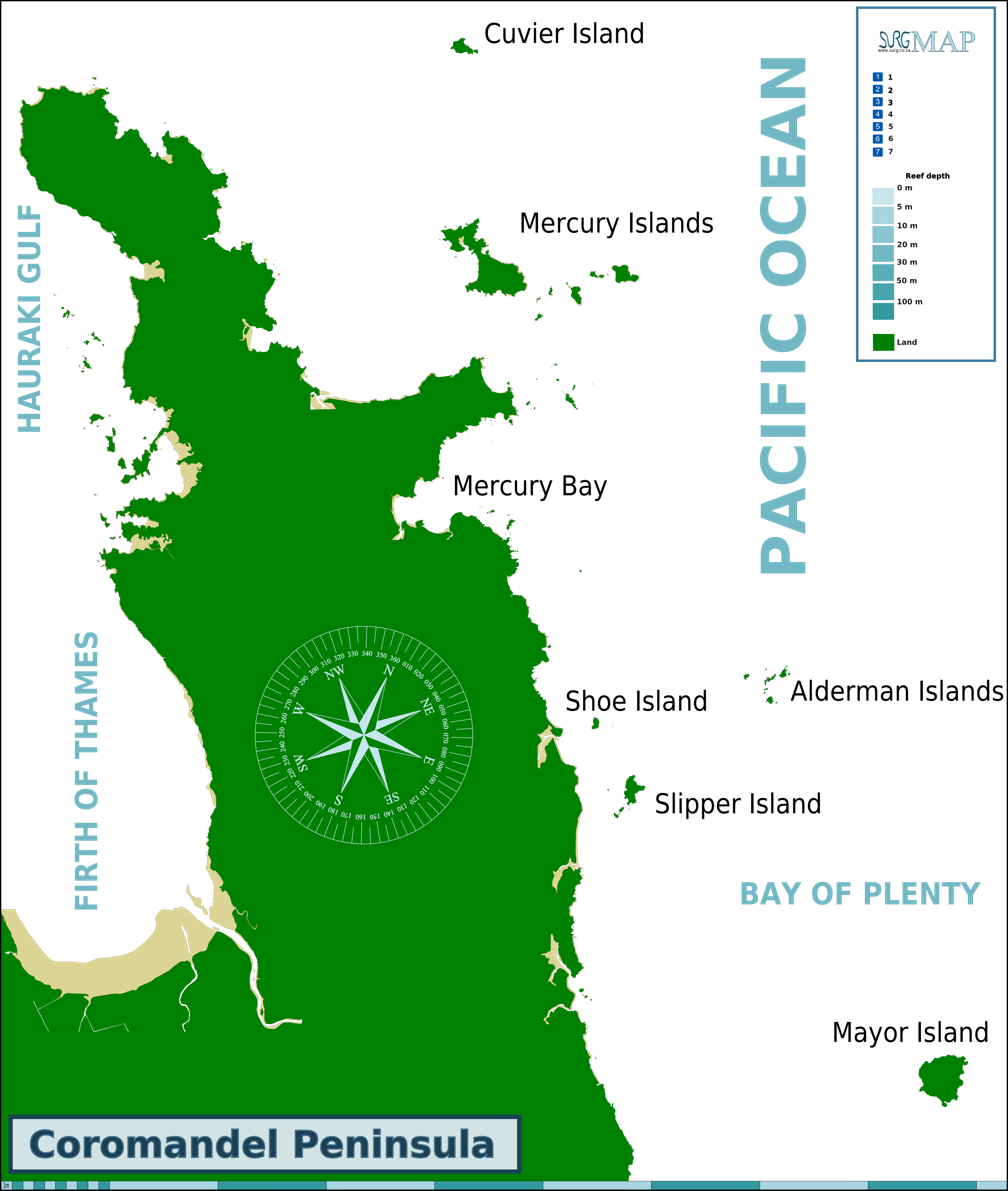
Location of Mercury Bay on the Coromandel Peninsula

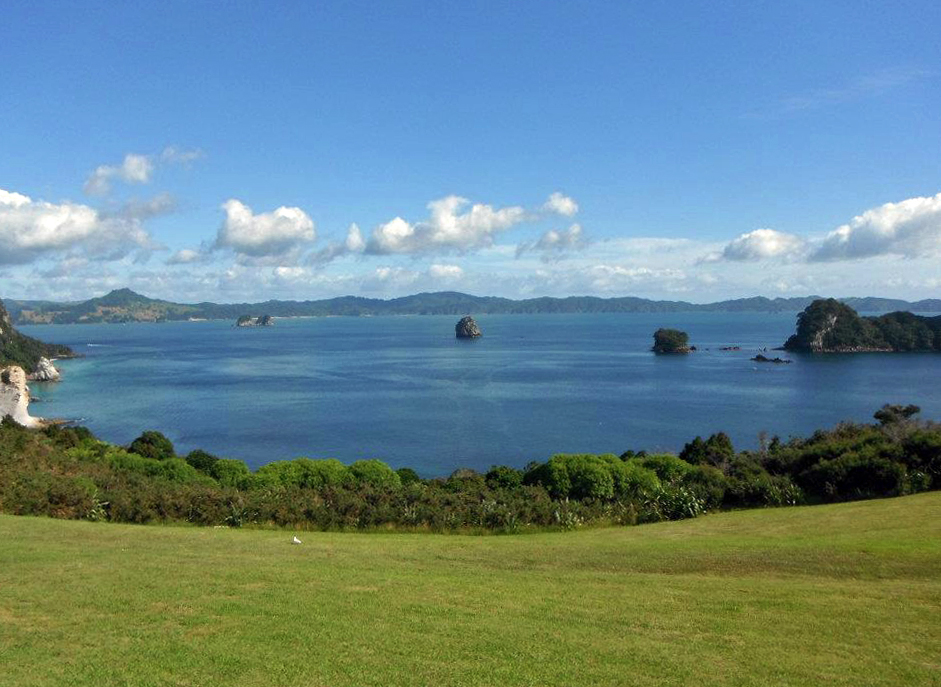
Mercury Bay

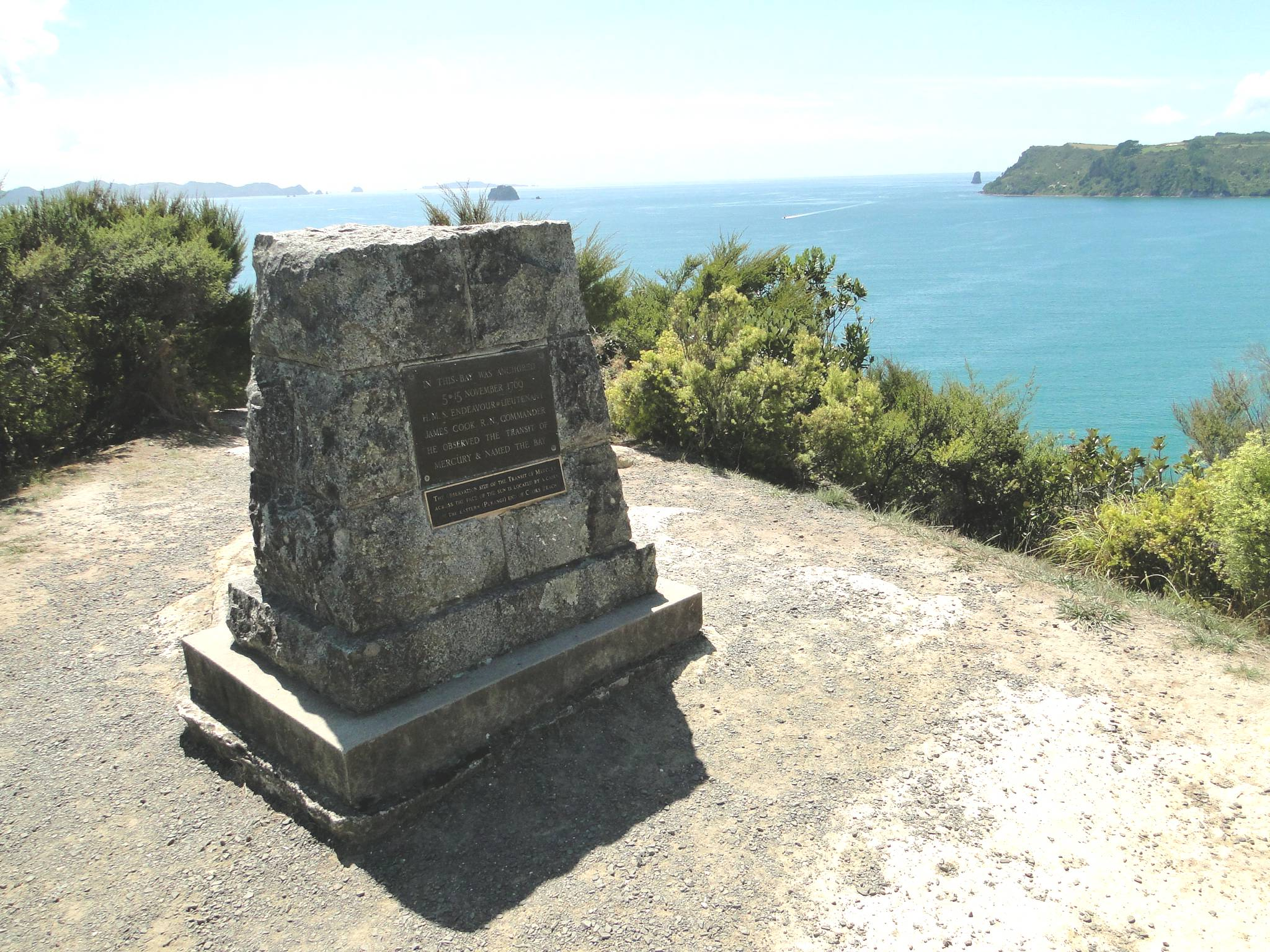
Memorial of Cook's observation of a transit of Mercury, incorrectly located across the bay from where Cook made his observation, at Shakespeare Cliff lookout near Cooks Beach.

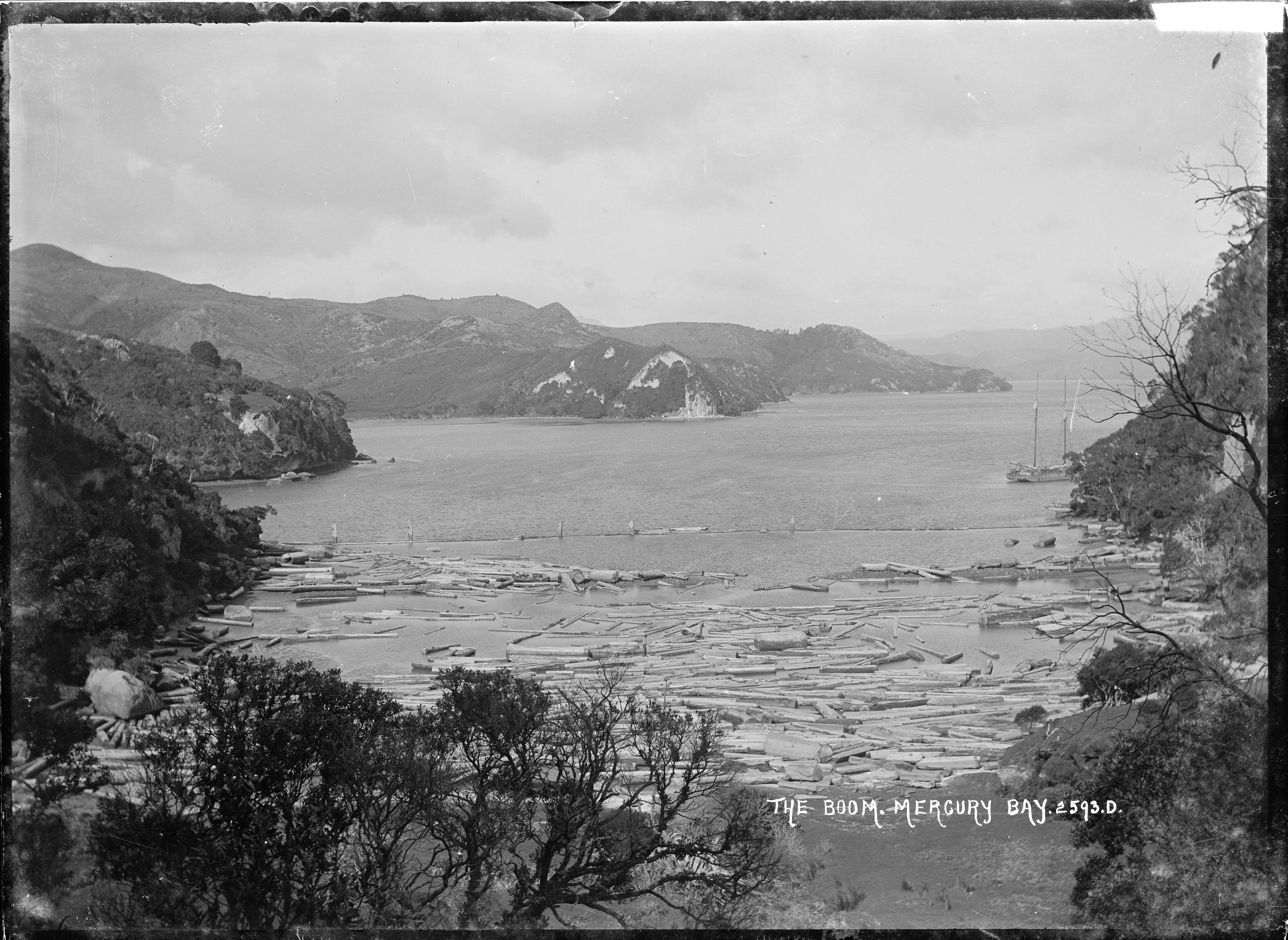
The boom, Mercury Bay, Coromandel Peninsula in early 1900s.

Mercury Bay is a large V-shaped bay on the eastern coast of the Coromandel Peninsula in the North Island of New Zealand. It was named by the English navigator Captain James Cook during his exploratory expeditions. The bay was originally named Te-Whanganui-a-Hei, the great bay of Hei, by the Māori.

On 9 November 1769, Cook landed on the shores of the bay to observe a Transit of Mercury. In 1919, an area of land around Shakespeare Cliff was set aside and a small memorial was constructed, based on the erroneous belief that it marked the location of Cook's observations. However, the actual site of Cook's landing and observation was at the eastern end of Cook's Beach, near the Purangi estuary. A smaller memorial plinth was later established there.

The brig Trial and the schooner Brothers were attacked by Māori on 20 August 1815 in Mercury Bay, during which several sailors were killed. The bay was also the resting place of HMS Buffalo, a ship that transported passengers and prisoners to Australia, which was wrecked in a storm in 1840.

The mouth of Mercury Bay is approximately ten kilometres wide, and its coastline extends for about 20 km. On the shore of the bay lies the resort town of Whitianga, where a natural harbour is formed by an arm of the bay that extends a further six kilometres inland to the south. Several small islets are located at the southern and northern extremities of the bay, and the Mercury Islands lie about 10 km to the north. The Whanganui A Hei (Cathedral Cove) Marine Reserve is located in the southern part of the bay.

Named locations along Mercury Bay include Buffalo Beach, Wharekaho, Ferry Landing, Shakespeare Cliff, Lonely Bay, Flaxmill Bay, Cooks Beach, Purangi Estuary, Cathedral Cove and Hahei.

Mercury Bay is a popular location for game fishing, with the Mercury Bay Game Fishing Club being one of the largest in New Zealand. The bay is also well known for yachting. The Mercury Bay Boating Club in Whitianga was the challenging club in New Zealand's first America's Cup challenge in 1987.

An arched rock formation once stood in Mercury Bay but has since collapsed. It was illustrated in the 1700s aboard James Cook's Endeavour and was depicted with a pā situated on top of the rock.
