= Ngāti Porou ki Harataunga =

Māori iwi (tribe) in Hauraki, New Zealand

- Ancestors: Paikea, Porourangi, Kahungunu, Rākairoa, Materoa, Te Aowera
- Ancestral mountains: Konaki, Kahutara, Tokatea
- Ancestral rivers: Harataunga
- Ancestral bodies of water: Ngā Wai Rōnaki/Harataunga
- Ancestral waka: Nukutaimemeha, Horouta, Tākitimu
- Hapū: Te Whānau-a-Rākairoa, Te Aitanga-a-Materoa, Te Aowera
- Marae: Harataunga Marae (Rākairoa)
- Branches: Ngāti Porou ki Mataora
- Region: Harataunga, Hauraki
- Affiliations/kin: Ngāti Porou, Ngāti Kahungunu, Ngāti Rongomaiwāhine

Ngāti Porou ki Harataunga, is a Māori iwi (tribe) residing in the Harataunga/Kennedy Bay region of Hauraki, and is a branch of the wider Ngāti Porou ki Hauraki iwi, which itself, is a branch of Ngāti Porou. Although an offshoot of the Ngāti Porou iwi, Ngāti Porou ki Harataunga withhold an identity recognisable as unique, but also hold tightly onto their links to the Ngāti Porou of the Tairāwhiti.

== Pre-European history ==
=== Paikea ===
The ancestry of Ngāti Porou ki Hauraki tie them into the bloodlines of Paikea, of Māui, and of Toi-te-huatahi. Dating back to the arrival of Paikea to Great Mercury Island or Ahuahu (full name: Te Ahuahutunga-o-Paikea), and his marriage to Te Āhurumōwairaka, Ngāti Porou ki Hauraki, although arguably the youngest iwi of Hauraki, possess ties to Hauraki that date back to before the arrival of the migratory waka.

By his marriage with Te Āhurumōwairaka, Paikea had three sons:

- Maru-nui
- Maru-papa-nui
- Maru-whaka-aweawe

Through these three sons, families of Harataunga and Mataora are connected to Hauraki.

After spending time on Ahuahu, Paikea crossed westwards to Kennedy Bay, also known as Harataunga. Upon his arrival, he named the land Te Ara Hou (The New Path). From here, his journey down the eastern coast line is recorded by Te Kaapa Te Horua Pōtae (1879/80–1954), a kaumātua of Harataunga and a grandson of Mokena Te Horua. According to Pakaariki Harrison, along with the Kaapa recordings, Paikea is accredited with the naming of:

- Ōpito, named after the place Paikea cut the umbilical cord of a woman accompanying him who had given birth
- Whitianga, named after the doubts of women (who were descendants of Kupe) in crossing the tides of a river
- Tairua, named after the two large waves that were followed by gentle water, repeated, at the mouth of a river
- Pāuanui, named after the abundance of pāua
- Ōhui, named after the hospitality of the local people
- Wharekawa, named after the bitter taste of kōwhai blossoms in the water of the river
- Waihi, named after the rising and flowing of water from an underground stream
- Katikati, named after the nipping of mussels at his feet

=== Te Arawa ===
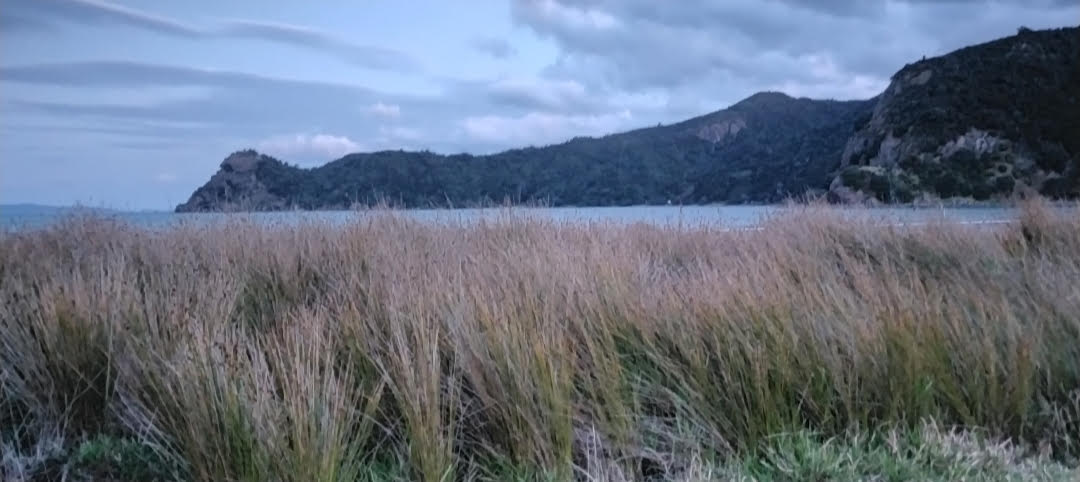
Ohau, residence of Ngāti Piri. Southern crest of Harataunga.

Upon the arrival of Te Arawa to New Zealand, the descendants of Huarere, a grandson of Tama-te-kapua, and Hei, an uncle of Tama-te-kapua, spread out widely. Originally, Harataunga was territory of Ngāti Hako. However, after the colonisation of Hauraki by the Arawa peoples, Harataunga fell into the hands of Ngāti Huarere. Harataunga remained under Ngāti Huarere until 1640, when Huarere gifted it to Ngāti Tamaterā, after aiding the Huarere peoples in conflicts with Ngāti Hei.

Harataunga was inhabited by the Huarere hapū of Ngāti Raukatauri, and Ngāti Piri. Twenty years after the gifting to Tamaterā, Paeke, a great-grandson of Raukatauri, became rangatira of the local Ngāti Huarere.

Great strife followed when two other hapū of Ngāti Huarere, Ngāti Inu and Ngāti Piri, trespassed on Ngāti Raukatauri fishing grounds at Pungarewa Reef, between Harataunga and Ahuahu. Paeke and his son Tairinga witnessed this trespass, and set out with an ope tauā. Here, at Pungarewa, Paeke was killed.

On the contrary, Tairinga managed to defeat and pursue the Ngāti Inu and Ngāti Piri to Whangapoua, but alas, he returned to Harataunga.

The Ngāti Raukatauri of Harataunga resided in Maungakahutia Pā, a grand fortified settlement atop the slops of Kahutara, until the Battle of Brothers and Trial, in which the pā was completely destroyed.

== Ngāti Porou arrival and the establishment of Ngāti Porou ki Harataunga ==
From 1640, Ngāti Raukatauri, Ngāti Piri, and Ngāti Tamaterā lived in Harataunga simultaneously, until the gifting of the land to Ngāti Porou in 1852. Ngāti Porou traders such as Te Rakahurumai supplied Auckland (Tāmaki-makau-rau) with produce such as maize, wheat and pigs. Sailing from Tūpāroa resulted in Te Rakahurumai asking the local rangatira, Pāora Te Pūtu, for a small piece of land where they could stop and rest, where they could live, and bury their dead until they could exhume the bodies and return them to Te Tairāwhiti. Ngāti Porou sailors had been temporarily burying their dead at Harataunga for a period of time already. Pāora Te Pūtu eventually consented. However, Te Rakahurumai and all who sailed with him aboard his ship, the Kingi Paerata, drowned at sea, not living to see the gifting through.

Although Te Rakahurumai and his crew had died, other rangatira of his entourage survived him to see the gifting through. Rangatira such as Raniera Kāwhia, Henare Makoare, and Mokena Te Horua asked Pāora to gift them the land which he had promised Te Rakahurumai. Āporo Hikitāpua, chief administrator of Te Rakahurumai, had earlier aided in teaching Pāora and the local hapū how to sail and trade alongside Te Rakahurumai.

Hence, eventually, Pāora gifted the land to Ngāti Porou, under the take (cause) of tuku-tāpae-toto, in recognition also of Ngāti Porou's aid in conflicts with Ngā Puhi. To seal this gifting, a mere pounamu named Whaitā was gifted to the Tamaterā; this mere is now lost.

== Hapū and marae ==
The hapū that those of Ngāti Porou ki Harataunga ki Mataora stock are made up of are broad and numerous. Originally, Harataunga was gifted to the eight hapū of:

- Te Whānau-a-Rākairoa
- Te Aitanga-a-Materoa
- Te Aowera
- Ngāti Hoko
- Ngāti Tāwera
- Ngāti Rau
- Te Whānau-a-Iritekura
- Te Whānau-a-Ruataupare

However, the iwi nowadays is represented by:

- Te Whānau-a-Rākairoa
- Te Aitanga-a-Materoa
- Te Aowera

Although, they hold links to:

- Te Whānau-a-Ruataupare
- Te Whānau-a-Tūwhakairiora
- Te Whānau-a-Iritekura
- Te Whānau-a-Te Haemata
- And also to Te Whānau-a-Hinetāpora, of Ngāti Uepōhatu

Ngāti Porou ki Harataunga is represented by Harataunga Marae.

== Landmarks ==
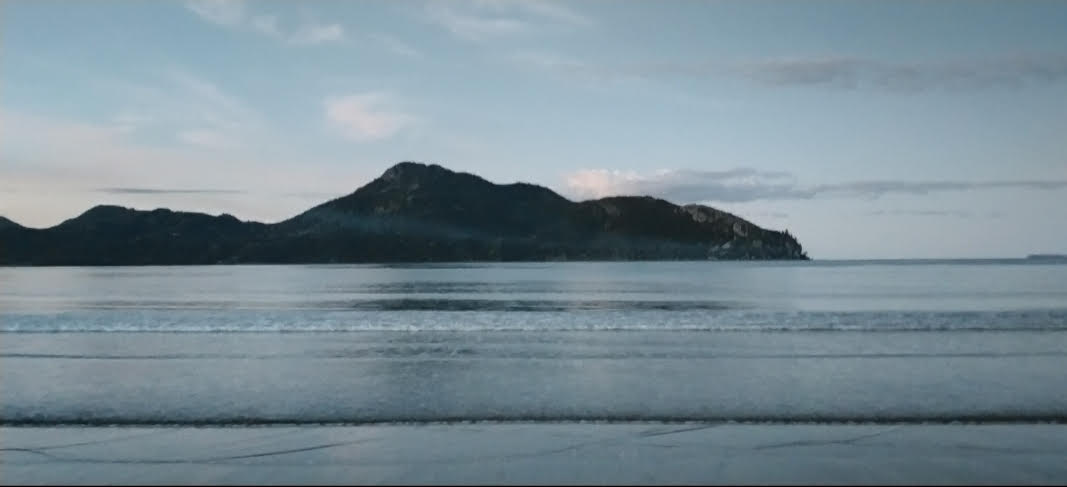
Kahutara Maunga, residence of Ngāti Raukatauri. Northern Crest of Harataunga

The landmarks of Ngāti Porou ki Harataunga consist of three (main) maunga (mountain):

1. Konaki (Also known as Konake, Koinaki, Te Koinaki-o-Whakaotirangi
2. Kohutara (Also known as Kahutara, Te Tara-a-Kahumatamomoe)
3. Tokatea

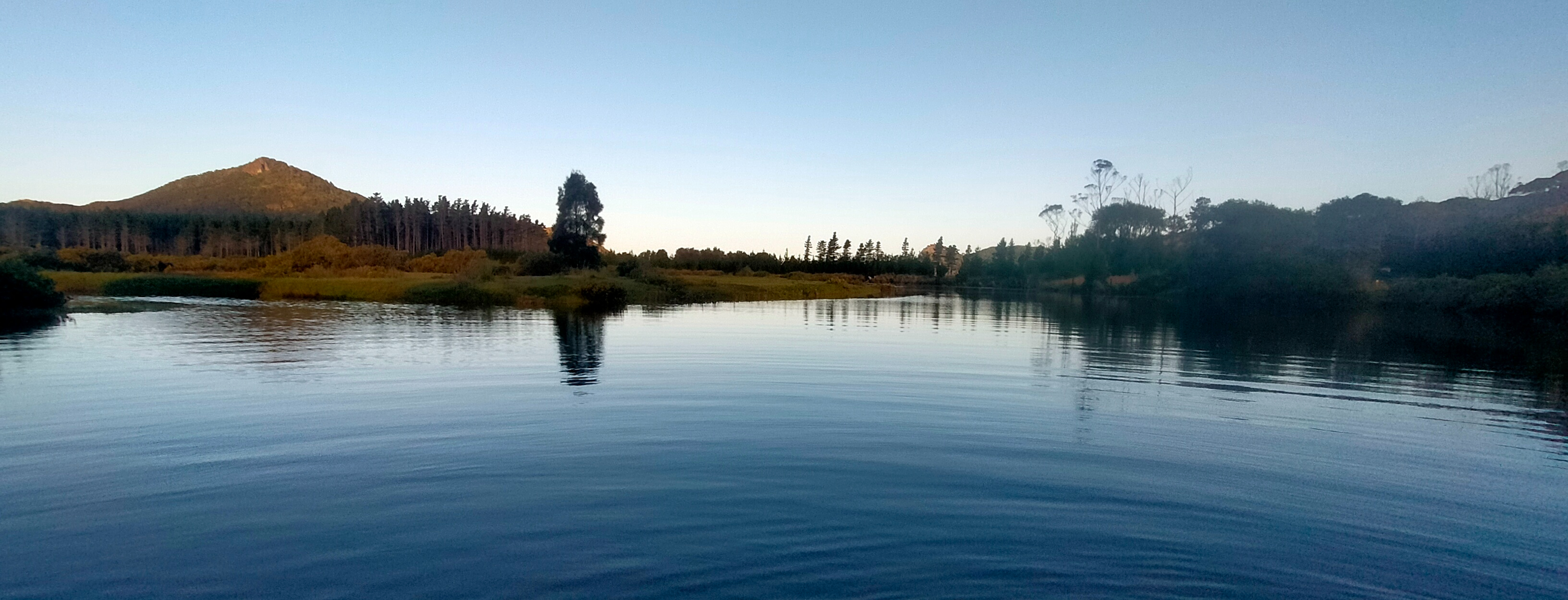
Waipuna Awa, Kahutara overlooking

However, the rohe (boundaries/region) of Ngāti Porou ki Harataunga is as follows:

1. Mai Ohineperu, ki Piripirikahu,
2. Mai Piripirikahu, ki Taraingapoito
3. Mai Taraingapoito ki Te Pū
4. Mai Te Pu ki Tahatū
5. Mai Tahatū ki Te Ranga
6. Mai Te Ranga ki Tau-o-Maroiri
7. Mai Tau-o-Maroiri ki Tokatea
8. Mai Tokatea ki Kaipāua
9. Mai Kaipāua ki Waikoromiko
10. Mai Waikoromiko ki Pukeohiku
11. Mai Pukeohiku ki Hapapawera
12. Mai Hapapawera ki Pukenui
13. Mai Pukenui ki Tapuae
14. Mai Tapuae ki Kakahiaroa
15. Mai Kakahiaroa ki Pukeruru
16. Mai Pukeruru tae rawa atu ki Te Harakeke

According to Raniera Kāwhia, this was the boundary told to him by Te Waipane, father of Pāora Te Pūtu.

They also consist of an awa (river):

- Harataunga (Also known as Waipuna)

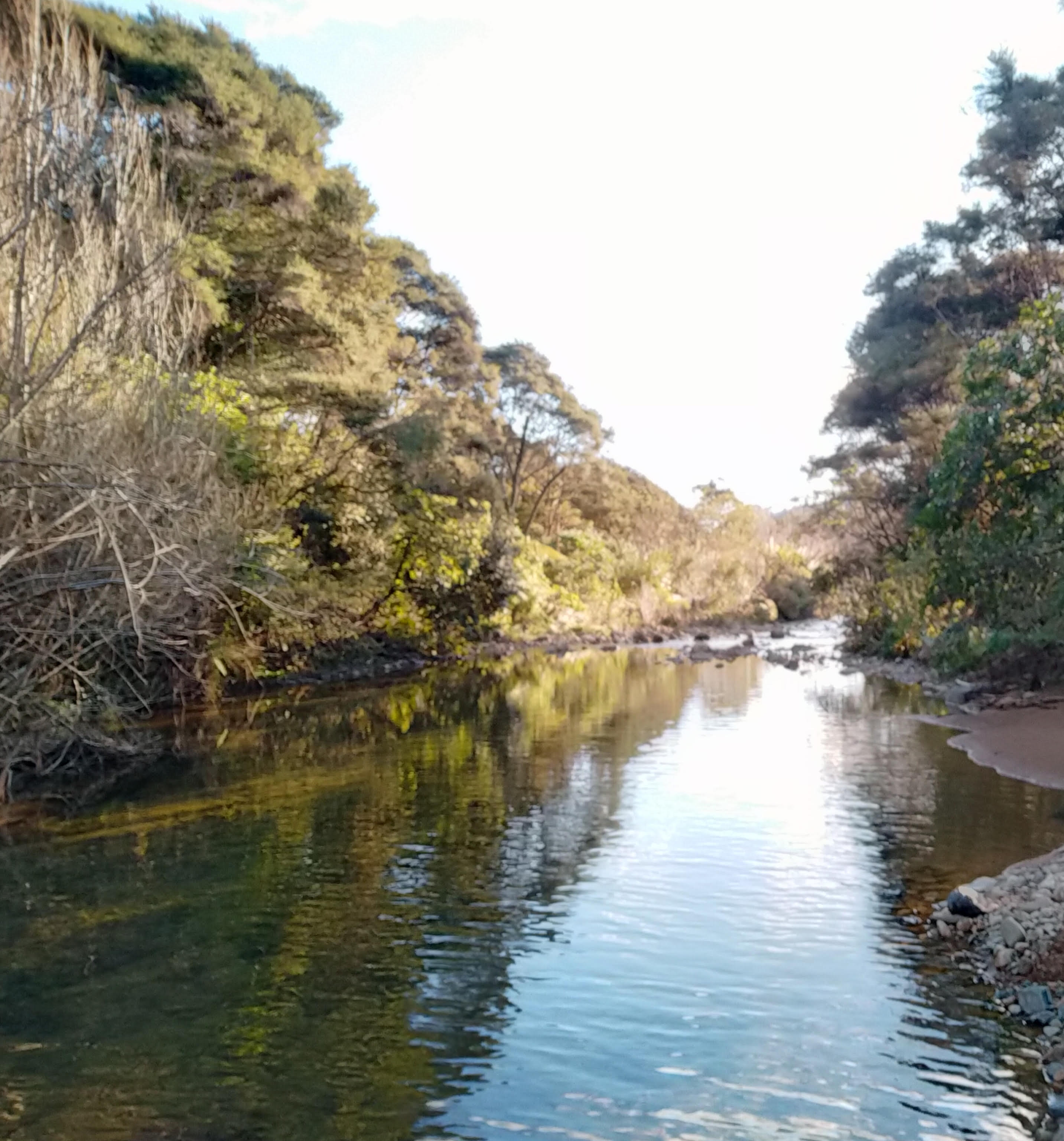
Kōpurukaitai Awa

The Harataunga River branches off into several streams:

1. Mangatū
2. Waipuna
3. Omaho (the three main branches)
4. Wairākau
5. Kōpurukaitai
6. Waikoromiko
7. Pakore
8. Awaroa
9. Ohau
10. Oneria

== Links to other iwi ==
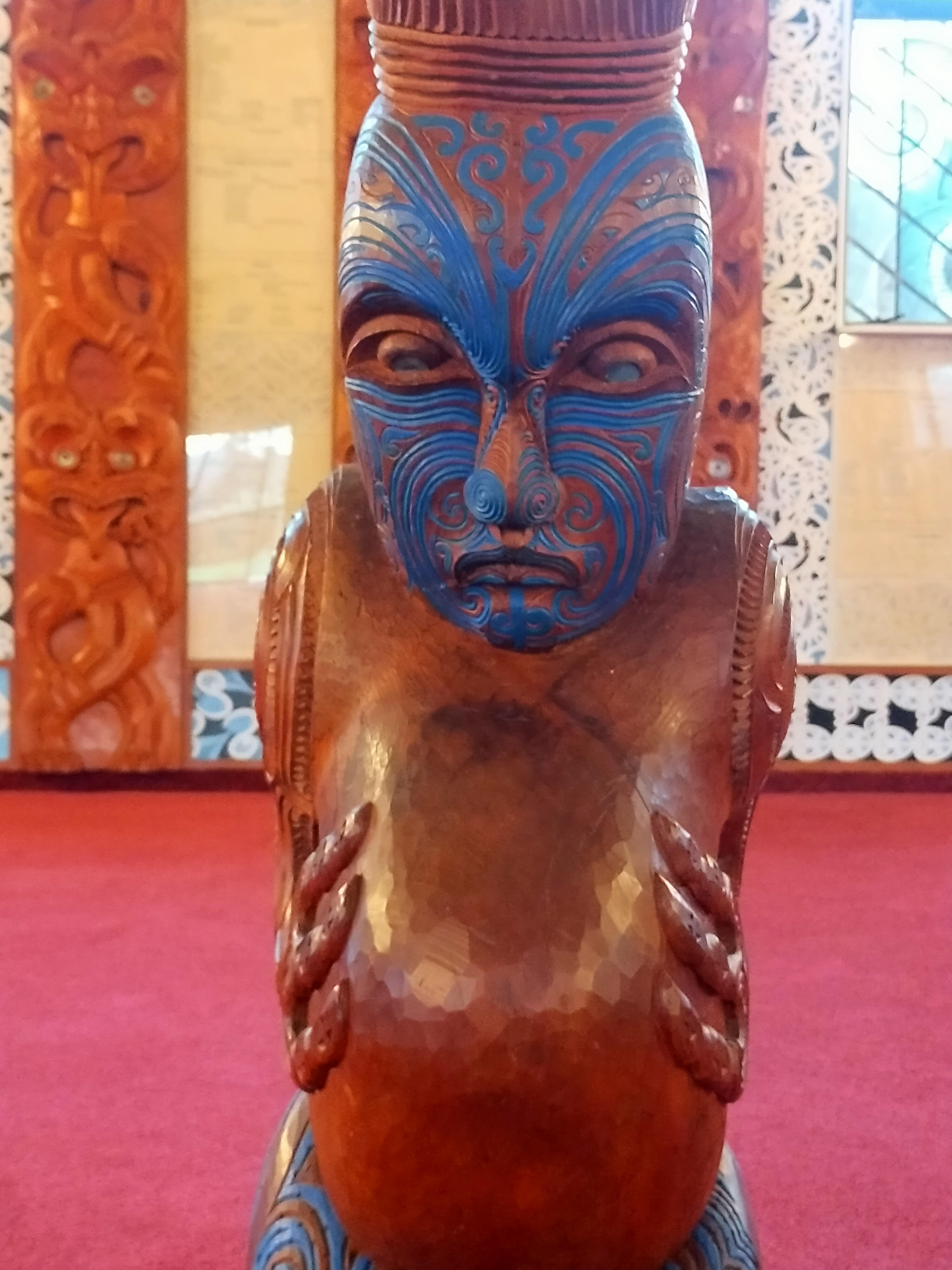
Te Hūkui-o-te-rangi, Harataunga Marae

Through their ancestors of Te Whānau-a-Rākairoa and Te Aitanga-a-Materoa, Ngāti Porou ki Harataunga share kinship with the iwi of Ngāti Kahungunu.

Kahungunu married Rongomaiwahine and had five children. Ngāti Porou ki Harataunga descend from his son Tamateakota, and his daughter Tauheikurī.

Tamateakota married Rongokauae (Or Rongokauai), and had:

- Tawakerāhui, who had:
  - Tamaterongo, who had married Materoa, daughter of Poroumātā

Although, some Ngāti Porou also descend from another husband of Materoa, Te Rangitarewa and their son Tamaihu.

Tauheikurī married Tamataipūnoa, and had:

- Tawhiwhi, who married Te Ahiwhakamauroa and had:
  - Tawake, who had married Rākaimataura and had Roro, father of:
    - Te Hūkui-o-te-rangi
    - Hikatoa

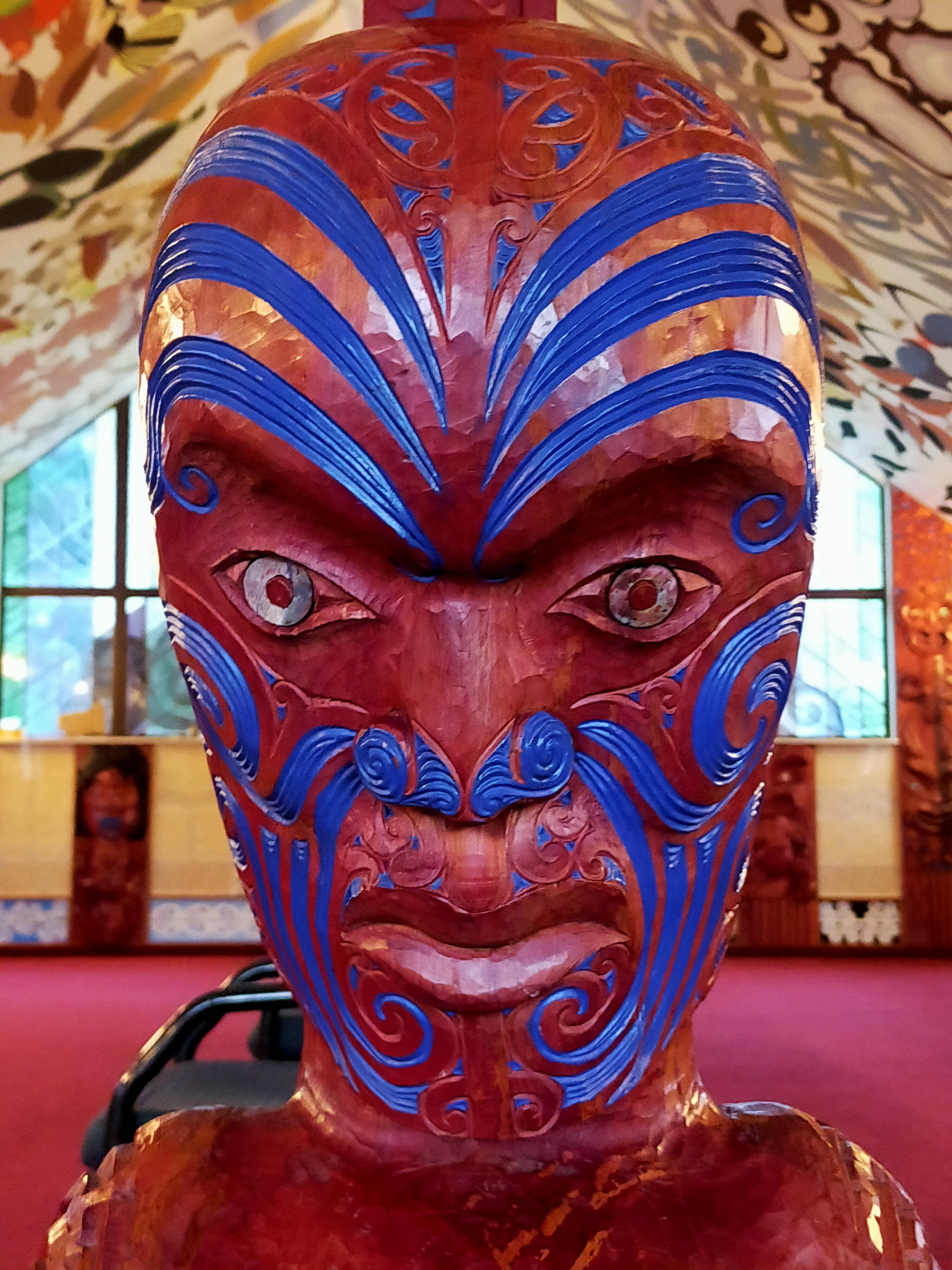
Hikatoa, Harataunga Marae

Rākairoa first married Te Hūkui-o-te-rangi, they had:

- Te Haemata, ancestress of Te Whānau-a-Te Haemata. She had:
  - Tūhorouta, who had:
    - Te Ika-a-te-waiwaha

After the death of Te Hūkui, she married Hikatoa, and had:

- Pōnapatukia, who had
  - Te Kauwhiriwhiri, who had
    - Whakahana, who married Te Ika-a-te-waiwaha, uniting both lines of Te Hūkui and Hikatoa

After the death of Hikatoa, she married Roro. They had two children:

- Ika-wānanga
- Te Ketemingi

Some of the Te Whānau-a-Rākairoa of Harataunga specifically, descend from Ritihia Te Riunui (or Ruinui), a sister of Rōpata Wahawaha.

Through the marriage of Tawhiwhi to Te Ahiwhakamauroa, Ngāti Porou ki Harataunga claim descent from Rongomaiwāhine and her first husband, Tama-taku-kai.

== Notable people ==
- John Tamihere
- Pakariki Harrison

== See also ==
- Ngāti Porou
- Ngāti Porou ki Hauraki
- Kennedy Bay
