= Kennedy Bay =

- Interactive map of Kennedy Bay
- Coordinates: 36°40′51″S 175°33′14″E
- Country: New Zealand
- Region: Waikato
- District: Thames-Coromandel District
- Ward: Coromandel-Colville ward
- Community Board: Coromandel-Colville Community
- Electorates: Coromandel; Hauraki-Waikato (Māori)

Government
  - Council: Thames-Coromandel District Council
  - Regional council: Waikato Regional Council
  - Mayor of Thames-Coromandel: Peter Revell
  - Coromandel MP: Scott Simpson
  - Hauraki-Waikato MP: Hana-Rawhiti Maipi-Clarke

Area
  - Total: 64.66 km^{2} (24.97 sq mi)

Population (2023)
  - Total: 240
  - Density: 3.7/km^{2} (9.6/sq mi)

Kennedy Bay (also called Kennedy's Bay and Harataunga) is a locality in the north eastern Coromandel Peninsula of New Zealand. The Harataunga and Omoho Streams flow from the Coromandel Range past the settlement and into the bay to the east.

There are several companies aquafarming pāua, lobster and mussels in the bay.

The iwi affiliated to Kennedy bay is Ngāti Porou ki Hauraki.

== History and culture ==
=== Huarere settlement ===
The area originally belonged to Ngāti Huarere, who gave it to Ngāti Tamaterā in recognition of their help after a conflict with Ngāti Hei. They gave it to Ngāti Porou, who had used it as a shelter during trading trips to Auckland, in thanks for assistance against the Ngā Puhi in the Musket Wars of the early 19th century.

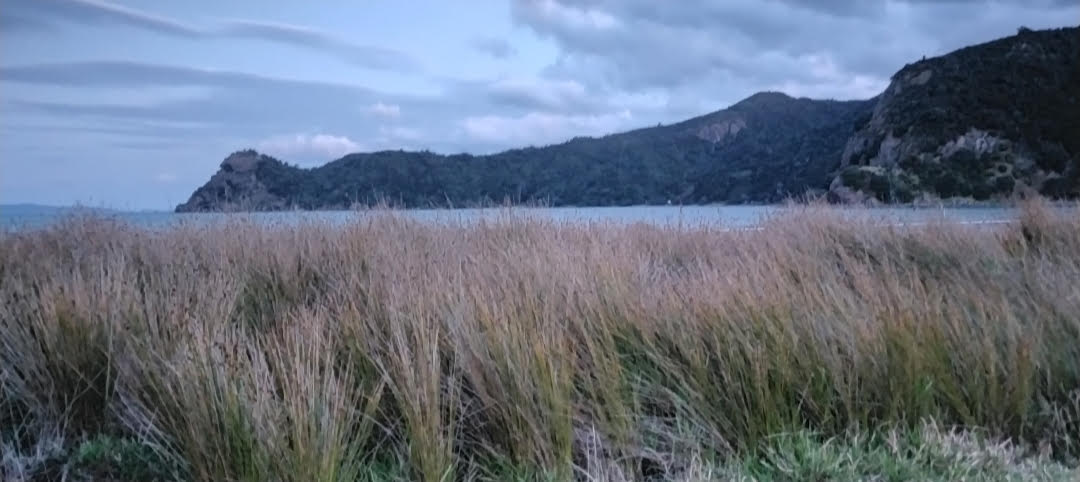
Ohau, residence of Ngāti Piri. Southern crest of Harataunga.

Upon the arrival of Te Arawa to New Zealand, the descendants of Huarere, a grandson of Tama-te-kapua, and Hei, an uncle of Tama-te-kapua spread out vastly. Originally, Harataunga was territory of Ngāti Hako. However, after the colonisation of Hauraki by the Arawa peoples, Harataunga fell into the hands of Ngāti Huarere. Harataunga remained under Ngāti Huarere, until 1640, when Huarere gifted it to Ngāti Tamaterā, after aiding the Huarere peoples in conflicts with Ngāti Hei.

Harataunga was inhabited by the Huarere hapū of Ngāti Raukatauri, and Ngāti Piri. Twenty years after the gifting to Tamaterā, Paeke, a great-grandson of Raukatauri, became rangatira of the local Ngāti Huarere.

Great strife followed, when two other hapū of Ngāti Huarere, Ngāti Inu and the aforementioned Ngāti Piri, trespassed on Ngāti Raukatauri fishing grounds at Pungarewa Reef, between Harataunga and Ahuahu. Paeke, along with his son, Tairinga, witnessed this trespass, and set out with an ope tauā. Here, at Pungarewa, Paeke was killed.

On the contrary, Tairinga managed to defeat and pursue the Ngāti Inu and Ngāti Piri to Whangapoua, but alas, he returned to Harataunga.

The Ngāti Raukatauri of Harataunga resided in Maungakahutia Pā, a grand fortified settlement atop the slops of Kahutara, until the Battle of Brothers and Trial, in which the pā was completely destroyed.

=== Modern history ===
In July 1815, the schooner Brothers and the Trial were attacked by local Māori with the loss of several crew from both vessels. The incident may have been provoked by unscrupulous trading by a Captain Hovell earlier.

Te Paea o Hauraki Marae is located at Kennedy Bay. It is a tribal meeting ground for Ngāti Tamaterā and includes Te Paea meeting house.

Alongside Te Paea o Hauraki Marae is Harataunga Marae, also known as Rākairoa. Harataunga Marae, carved by Pakariki Harrison, is a meeting ground for the descendants of Ngāti Porou ki Harataunga, consisting of:

- Rākairoa - The whare tipuna.
- Ngaropi - The wharekai, named after Heni Ngaropi White.
- Iritekura - A whare-ako.

Both Rākairoa and Iritekura are ancestresses of the local Ngāti Porou.

== Education ==
Te Kura Kaupapa Māori o Harataunga is a coeducational full primary (years 1-8) school with a roll of 10 as of July 2026. It is a Kura Kaupapa Māori school which teaches fully in the Māori language. The school was established in 1996.

== Demographics ==
Kennedy Bay settlement is in an SA1 statistical area which covers 64.66 km^{2} (24.97 sq mi) and includes the area around Kennedy Bay and to the west and southwest of it. The SA1 area is part of the larger Colville statistical area.

Historical population for Kennedy Bay and surrounds
Year	Pop.	±% p.a.
2006	177	—
2013	162	−1.26%
2018	219	+6.21%
2023	240	+1.85%

The SA1 statistical area had a population of 240 in the 2023 New Zealand census, an increase of 21 people (9.6%) since the 2018 census, and an increase of 78 people (48.1%) since the 2013 census. There were 120 males, 120 females and 3 people of other genders in 84 dwellings. 1.2% of people identified as LGBTIQ+. The median age was 37.0 years (compared with 38.1 years nationally). There were 54 people (22.5%) aged under 15 years, 39 (16.2%) aged 15 to 29, 108 (45.0%) aged 30 to 64, and 39 (16.2%) aged 65 or older.

People could identify as more than one ethnicity. The results were 60.0% European (Pākehā); 81.2% Māori; 7.5% Pasifika; 1.2% Asian; and 1.2% Middle Eastern, Latin American and African New Zealanders (MELAA). English was spoken by 96.2%, Māori language by 28.8%, and other languages by 1.2%. New Zealand Sign Language was known by 1.2%. The percentage of people born overseas was 5.0, compared with 28.8% nationally.

Religious affiliations were 22.5% Christian, 3.8% Māori religious beliefs, 2.5% New Age, and 1.2% other religions. People who answered that they had no religion were 62.5%, and 10.0% of people did not answer the census question.

Of those at least 15 years old, 15 (8.1%) people had a bachelor's or higher degree, 114 (61.3%) had a post-high school certificate or diploma, and 54 (29.0%) people exclusively held high school qualifications. The median income was $26,000, compared with $41,500 nationally. 6 people (3.2%) earned over $100,000 compared to 12.1% nationally. The employment status of those at least 15 was that 72 (38.7%) people were employed full-time, 27 (14.5%) were part-time, and 15 (8.1%) were unemployed.

== See also ==
- Messrs. Smyth Brothers' Tramway
