= Whitianga Festival of Speed =

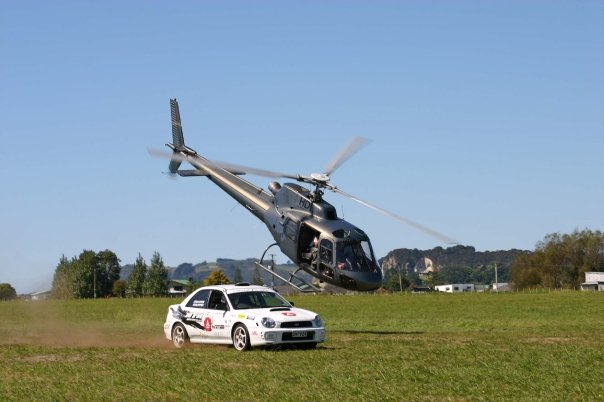
Helicopter vs Rally car race at 2009 Whitianga Festival of Speed

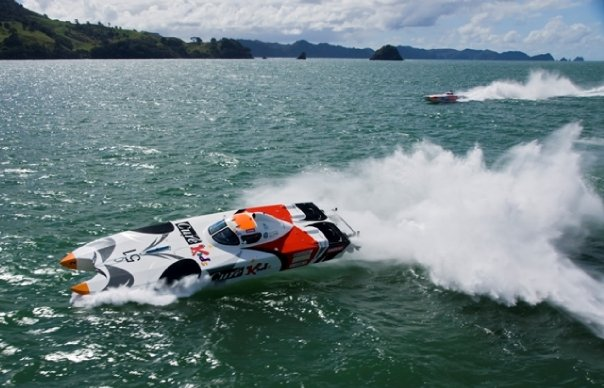
Offshore Power Boat Racing at 2009 Whitianga Festival of Speed

The Whitianga Festival of Speed (Whitianga FOS) was a motorsport festival held in the seaside town of Whitianga on the Coromandel Peninsula in New Zealand in 2009 and 2010. The festival hosted a multitude of events including the New Zealand Helicopter Championships, Offshore powerboat racing, Aerobatic Displays, Off-road Vehicle Demonstrations, Jet ski racing and bespoke events such as Rally Car Vs Helicopter racing. The event was free for spectators.

== Events ==
The motorsport events held at the festival were:

- Mass Aircraft Flyover
- New Zealand Helicopter Championships
- Warbird display
- Helicopters opening beer bottles
- Helicopters racing Rally Cars
- Big Boat Race
- Jet ski Racing
- Yak Aircraft aerobatic display
- Mustang Aircraft and Kittyhawk aerobatic display
- ThunderCat vs Jet ski event
- Offshore Power Boat vs Helicopter race
- NZOPA Offshore Power Boat Race
- Royal New Zealand Navy Patrol Vessel display
- Parachuting swooping display
- Go Kart race
- Mini club skill driving event
- Drift Car demonstration
- Motorcycle stunt riding
- V8 Supercar display
- Jetsprint demonstration and race
- Lawn mower racing
- NZ off-road series race
- Drag Race
- Rolling Thunder Parade
- Helicopter Display
- Auto show

== History ==
The inaugural Whitianga Festival of Speed was held over the weekend of 4–5 April 2009 as an additional event in the New Zealand Offshore Power Boat Series. It attracted an estimated 15,000–20,000 spectators.

The 2010 event was held on the weekend of 10–11 April and saw the crowd double to an estimated 40,000.
