= Ngāti Huarere =

Māori iwi in New Zealand

Ngāti Huarere is a Māori iwi. It descends from Huarere, who arrived via the Arawa in the 14th century.

== History ==
Ngāti Huarere was established by Huarere, the third son of Tuhoromatakakā in the mid to late 14th century. Tuhoromatakakā was himself son of Tama-te-kapua, the captain of the Arawa, and had settled with his father at Moehau Range, in the Coromandel Peninsula. After Tuhoromatakakā died, his four brothers dispersed, but Huarere and his descendants remained at Moehau. Before Huarere took over this area, it was inhabited by descendants of Mokoterea, with whom the Ngāti Huarere intermarried.

Before the Marutūāhu confederation expanded into the Coromandel Peninsula, the Ngāti Huarere consisted four main hapū:

- Ngāti Pare, residing at Whangapoua.
- Ngaāi Piri and Ngati Koheri, residing at Manaia harbour.
- Ngāti Raukatauri, residing at the coast around Moehau.

At one point, the Ngāti Huarere were also described as having a fifth (minor?) hapū, Ngāti Hinu, somewhere along the west coast.

At one point, Ngāti Huarere waged a war with Ngāti Hei. Ngāti Tamaterā (a member of the Marutūāhu confederation) assisted Ngāti Huarere, for which Ngāti Huarere awarded them the territory of Harataunga, which they had previously inhabited.

On one occasion when Marutūāhu and Ngāti Huarere were at peace, the two tribes met for a diving contest. A chief of Marutūāhu called Manaia and a lady of Ngāti Huarere called Tukutuku fell in love. Some young men in Ngāti Huarere who wanted Tukutuku for themselves seized Manaia while he was engaged in a long-distance diving contest, castrated him, murdered him, and buried his body in the seabed. They denied their crime, but Tukutuku suspected the truth and went to the beach to mourn each day. Eight days after the murder, Manaia's body washed up on shore and she reported the crime. Marutūāhu declared war on Ngāti Huarere and drove them out of the Hauraki and Coromandel regions. The surviving Ngāti Huarere resettled in the territory of Te Arawa, including the area of Horohoro and Tihi o Tonga.

By the middle of the 16th century, after or prior to the Ngāti Huarere-Ngāti Hei conflict (chronology uncertain), Ruamano was a chief of the Ngāti Huarere. Ruamano would find himself at war with Ngāti Tamaterā following the death of a tribesman named Mahanga at the hands of Ngāti Huarere. This war resulted in the Moehau Range being abandoned by Ngāti Huarere, who emigrated to the north to unite with the Te Kapotai iwi (inhabiting the Hokianga and Bay of Island district). Ngati Rauakatauri (a Ngāti Huarere hapū) continued to occupy parts of the Coromandel Peninsula.

Twelve generations after Huarere, Ngāti Huarere began settling Te Tātua a Riukiuta. They subsumed the Ngāti Riukiuta who already resided there.
