= The Mercury Bay Informer =

New Zealand newspaper

- Format: Tabloid
- Owner(s): Pauline and Stan Stewart
- Founded: 2003
- Language: English
- Headquarters: 14 Monk St; Whitianga, New Zealand
- Circulation: 6,500–8,000
- Website: www.theinformer.co.nz//

The Mercury Bay Informer is a newspaper in Whitianga, New Zealand. Established in 2003 by Denise Gunson, it was purchased in 2006 by Gerry Church and Linda Cholmondeley-Smith.In January 2013, it was bought by Stephan and Petra Bosman. Pauline and Stan Stewart bought The Informer in May 2022.

The paper was initially a black and white, A4 sized publication. It started being printed in colour in October 2012.

Published weekly on a Tuesday, it has a print run varying between 6,500 and 8000 copies (with more being printed in the busy summer season) throughout the Coromandel Peninsula. The paper varies between 28 and 44 pages. A winter and a summer magazine are also published.

The Informer covers news, events and people from the Whangapoua settlement in the north, down the east coast to Tairua. It reports on all areas of local history, culture, arts, sports and often profiles notable figures in the community. It also contains a weekly fishing report, provided by the Mercury Bay Game Fishing Club and a report by the Mercury Bay local police.

The paper has a website which is updated as and when news happens. An online version of the paper is also published.

In August 2015, The Mercury Bay informer sold the town of Whitianga on Trade Me for $32 to draw attention to the fact that people who live there were unable to list it as home when buying and selling on the site. A campaign in the paper, and an open letter from the paper's owner prompted the online auction company to rectify the situation, demonstrating the influence a local paper can have when speaking on behalf of its readers.

== See also ==
- Whitianga
- Mercury Bay
