= Trial (1808 ship) =

Ship seized by convicts and wrecked

History
- Owner: Simeon Lord
- In service: 1808
- Fate: Wrecked 1816

General characteristics
- Type: Brig
- Tons burthen: 80 (bm)

Trial was a ship that first appears in Australian newspaper records in 1808 and that was seized by convicts and eventually wrecked on the Mid North Coast of New South Wales, Australia in 1816.

Trial was a brig owned by the merchant Simeon Lord. Trial's first recorded voyage in 1808-1809 was to Fiji to purchase sandalwood under the captaincy of Henry Kable junior (1786–1852). Henry was the son of Henry Kable who pioneered the Pacific trade with his partners Simeon Lord and shipwright James Underwood. Cut off from the lucrative trade with China and India by the East India Company, Australian merchants turned to whaling and sealing, and to the emerging trade with the Pacific Islands with products including sandalwood, pork, pearls, pearl shell, flax, and sea cucumber. In between merchant voyages, Trial also travelled within the Australasian colonies. In early 1810, for example, she was hired to take a detachment from the 73rd Regiment to Port Dalrymple to relieve the 102nd Regiment of Foot.

By 1810, Trial was being commanded by Michael Fodger who became infamous for his treatment of both his crews and the Pacific Islanders he encountered on his trading voyages. In 1811, while in French Polynesia a shore party were attacked and several killed but Pōmare II insisted that the sailors had been the aggressors. On that same voyage, Fodger directed the Trial to Palmerston Island where they left a party of sailors to collect bêche-de-mer, shark fins, and pearl shells. Passing by a year later, now captain of the Daphne, Fodger would not pick up the survivors even after one swam out to the vessel with news of the deaths and injuries the party had suffered.

By 1814, Lord was expanding into new business ventures with Trial collecting a valuable shipment of red cedar from the Shoalhaven district before being chartered for the New South Wales New Zealand Company. Set up by five Sydney merchants (Simeon Lord, Garnham Blaxcell, Richard Brooks, William Hilton Hovell & E.S. Hall), the company hoped to create a monopoly on the flax and hemp trade from New Zealand. Although the monopoly was not granted, Trial set off for on 27 May 1815 for the Marquesas intending to stop at New Zealand and the Society Islands. After spending a month at the Bay of Islands, Trial under Captain Burnett and the schooner Brothers under Captain Hovell travelled south to the area near Kennedy Bay to trade in flax with the local Māori. On returning to collect the flax, however, the ships were attacked by the Māori and several sailors from both ships where killed. When the attack was reported the missionary Thomas Kendall blamed Hovell who had defrauded the Māori on the earlier visit. While Brothers returned to Sydney after the incident, Trial continued on to Tahiti and the Society Islands to find a cargo of sandalwood and pork.

== Commandeering the Trial ==
After returning from the Pacific in August 1816, Trial was soon preparing to leave again, this time for Tasmania. Crew and passengers intending to leave on the ship advertised their plans in the newspapers so that creditors could present any debts before they left. The crew included: Mr William Burnett (Captain), William Briskland, William Propert, William Garrod, John Snibson, WIlliam Morgan, Touboui (Tahitian), and Dick (Tahitian). The passengers included: Mr Thomas Miller, Alexander McKenzie, Mr Howe, and Sarah Futrill.

While waiting near the Sow and Pigs Reef in Port Jackson for good winds to take her to Port Dalrymple, she was seized by a group of thirteen convicts: Francis Harrison, Felix O'Neil, Charles Duche, Hugh Ward, Patrick Doyle, Thomas Dalton, James McMahon, James Murphy, Manuel da Sylva, John Ferrara, Thomas McGrath, Nicholas Russell, and Francis O'Hara. The ship was sailed northwards but was wrecked some 97 kilometres (60 mi) north of Port Stephens, in what is now called Trial Bay. The survivors of the wreck constructed a new boat out of the ship's remains but, according to Aboriginal informants, either capsized or disappeared from view. William Bennett (Trial's master), his crew, and some passengers, numbering eight or ten in total including a woman and child were left at Trial Bay. These survivors attempted to walk back to Newcastle but disappeared without a trace.

On 12 January 1817, Lady Nelson was dispatched from Newcastle, under the command of Thomas Whyte, to search for Trial. Whyte was successful; on 14 January he found Trial's remains, which consisted of a canvas tent and smashed timbers. Around this time, reports began to circulate of a woman, perhaps a stowaway on the Trial, who was living with a local Indigenous group. These rumours were given credence by a realistic short story by Philip Cohen called The "Karrarpee" published in 1893 which told the fictional story of Emily Bardon, the wife of the captain of Trial who had been living with Aboriginals near Smoky Cape until her 'rescue' in 1831.
