= Wharekawa River =

Coordinates: 37°09′S 175°52′E

Location
- Country: New Zealand

Physical characteristics
- Mouth
  - location: Wharekawa Harbour
- Length: 10 km (6.2 mi)

The Wharekawa River is a river of the Coromandel Peninsula, in the Waikato Region of New Zealand's North Island. It flows northeast to reach the Wharekawa Harbour halfway between Pauanui and Whangamatā.

== See also ==
- List of rivers of New Zealand
