= Pakariki Harrison =

New Zealand master carver (1928–2008)

Pakariki Harrison QSO
- Born: 6 July 1928; Ruatoria, New Zealand
- Died: 29 December 2008 (aged 80); Harataunga, New Zealand
- Education: Massey University; Auckland Teachers' College
- Known for: Carving
- Spouse: Hinemoa Harrison
- Awards: Honorary LittD, University of Auckland (1991); Te Tohu mō Te Arikinui Dame Te Atairangikaahu: Supreme Award, Creative New Zealand (1997)

Pakaariki "Paki" Harrison QSO (6 July 1928 – 29 December 2008) was a New Zealand master carver from Ngāti Porou. He is regarded as one of New Zealand's greatest carvers.

== Early life ==
Harrison was born in Ruatoria, the eldest of 21 children. He was raised by his grandmother Materoa Reedy and attended Hiruhārama Native School. Whilst attending Te Aute College, Harrison was introduced to carving by master carver, Pine Taiapa who became a lifelong influence. He was educated at Massey University and Auckland Teachers College.

== Marriage ==
Harrison married Hinemoa Rakena (b. 1931), also a Māori artist, who is noted for her traditional weaving, especially tukutuku panelling. Between them, they worked on the construction and decoration of many wharenui and other marae buildings.

== Carving ==
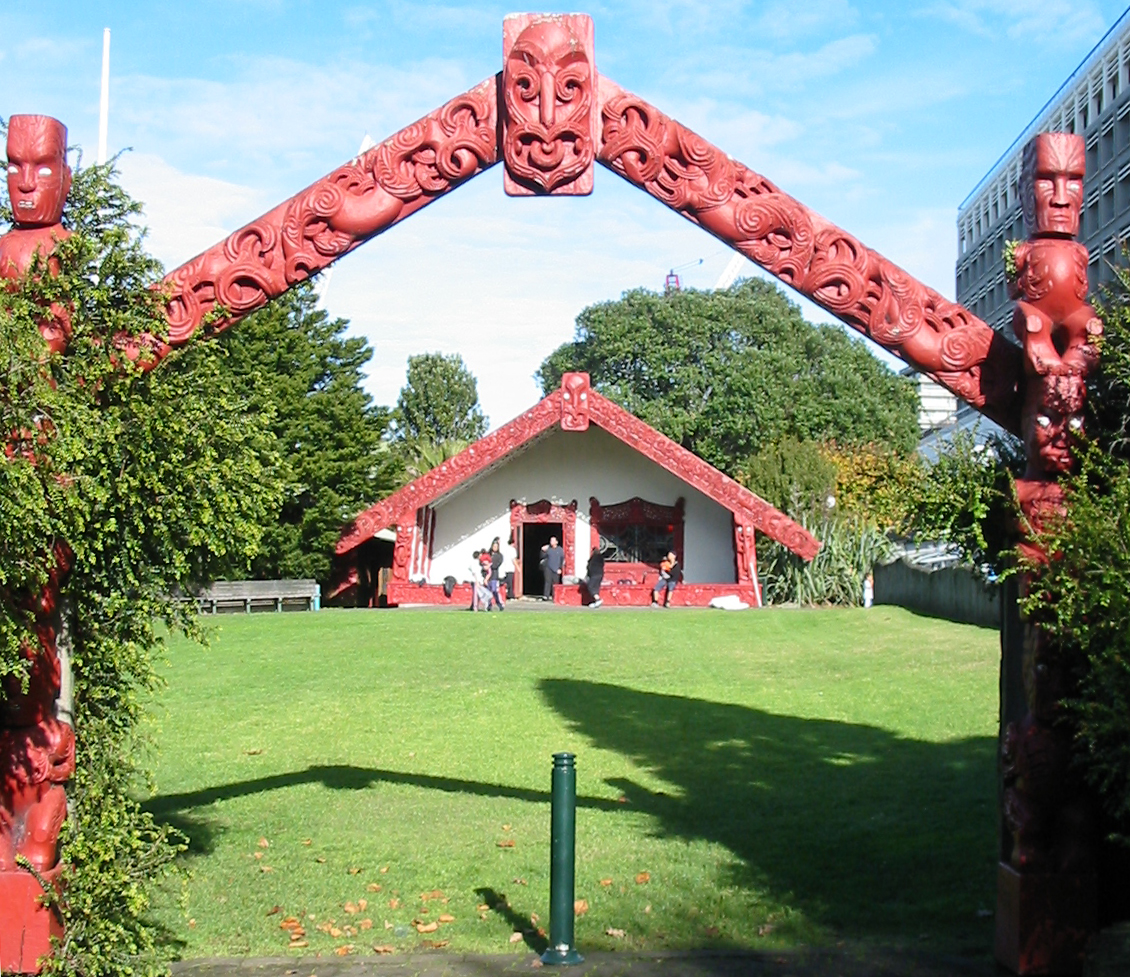
Tānenuiārangi, Waipapa Marae

Ranginui Walker writes that Harrison possessed "immense knowledge about the traditional arts of the carver, extending way beyond the actual physical arts to include its most ancient aspects - the symbolism contained in Māori art - to its role in transmitting old tribal history". Harrison wrote, taught and researched the art of Māori carving. With the support of his wife Hinemoa, Harrison supervised the construction of ten carved wharenui including: Te Waiariki at Whaiora marae, Ōtara (1977); Te Ōtāwhao at Te Awamutu College (1985); Tānenuiārangi at Waipapa marae, University of Auckland (1988); Rākairoa, Haratuanga marae, Kennedy Bay (1996); and Ngā Kete Wānanga, Manukau Institute of Technology, Otara (1999).

== Recognition ==
Harrison was awarded an honorary LittD by the University of Auckland in 1991. In 1997, Harrison and his wife, Hinemoa, received Te Tohu mō Te Arikinui Dame Te Atairangikaahu: Supreme Award from Creative New Zealand.

In the 2000 Queen's Birthday Honours, Harrison was appointed a Companion of the Queen's Service Order for community service.

In 2002, Harrison was named as the leader of the design team for Toi Iho / Māori Made mark for Creative New Zealand. The same year, He Tohunga Whakairo, a documentary about Harrison, directed by Moana Maniapoto and Toby Mills, won best Māori language programme at the New Zealand Television Awards.

Harrison was named a living icon of New Zealand arts by the Arts Foundation of New Zealand in 2005. In 2008, a biography of Harrison written by Ranginui Walker, Tohunga Whakairo: Paki Harrison, The Story of a Master Carver was published by Penguin Books.
