= Whitianga =

Town in Waikato, New Zealand

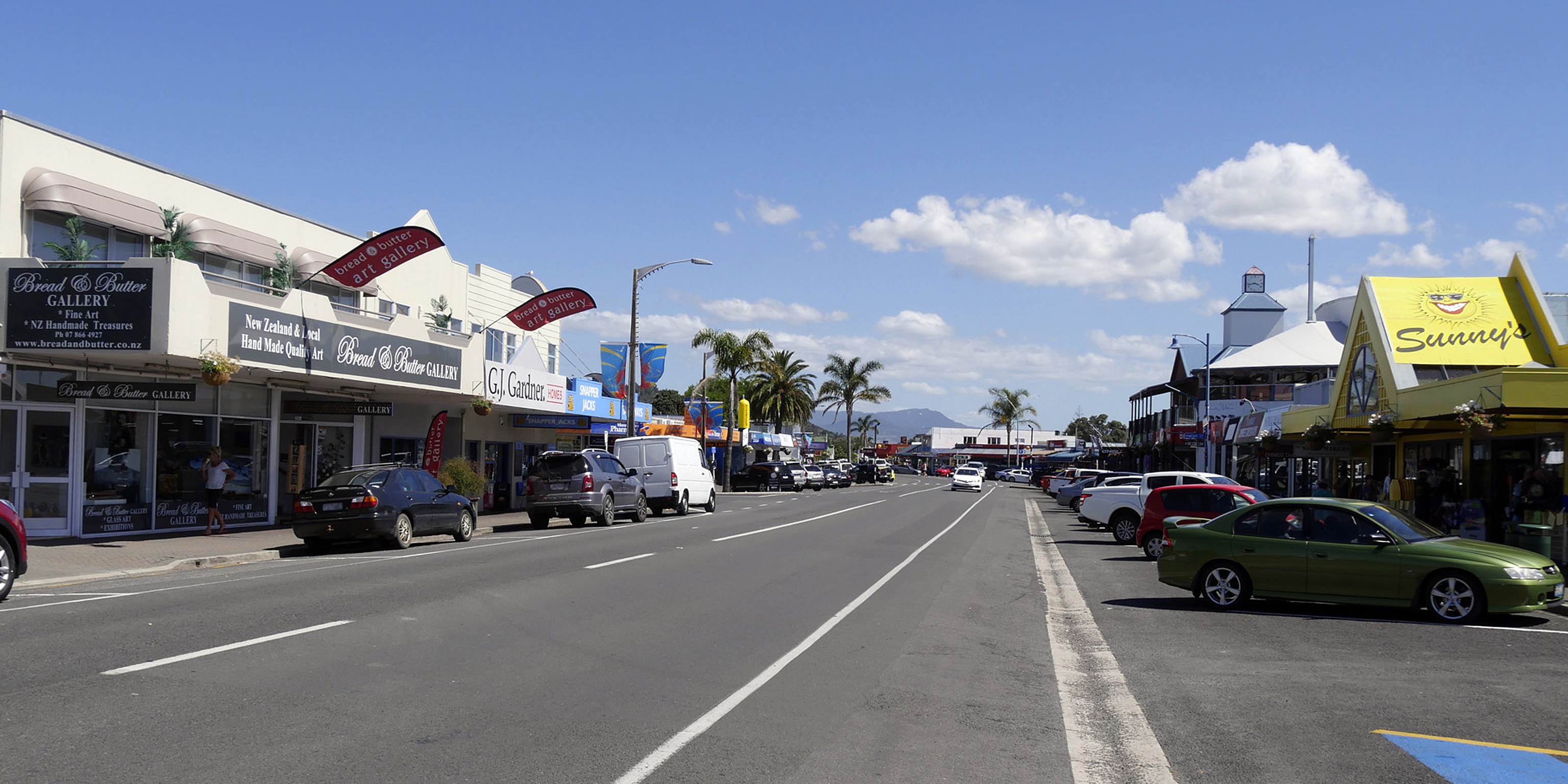
- Albert Street in Whitianga
- Interactive map of Whitianga
- Coordinates: 36°50′S 175°42′E
- Country: New Zealand
- Region: Waikato
- District: Thames-Coromandel District
- Ward: Mercury Bay ward
- Community Board: Mercury Bay Community
- Electorates: Coromandel; Hauraki-Waikato (Māori)

Government
  - Council: Thames-Coromandel District Council
  - Regional council: Waikato Regional Council
  - Mayor of Thames-Coromandel: Peter Revell
  - Coromandel MP: Scott Simpson
  - Hauraki-Waikato MP: Hana-Rawhiti Maipi-Clarke

Area
  - Total: 17.20 km^{2} (6.64 sq mi)

Population (June 2025)
  - Total: 6,140
  - Density: 357/km^{2} (925/sq mi)
- Postcode(s): 3510

Whitianga is a town on the Coromandel Peninsula, in the Waikato region of New Zealand's North Island. The town is located on Mercury Bay, on the northeastern coast of the peninsula. The town has a permanent population of 6,140 as of June 2025, making it the second-largest town on the Coromandel Peninsula behind Thames.

== Demographics ==
Stats NZ describes Whitianga as a small urban area, which covers 17.20 km^{2} (6.64 sq mi). It had an estimated population of 6,140 as of June 2025, with a population density of 357 people per km^{2}.

Historical population
Year	Pop.	±% p.a.
2006	3,804	—
2013	4,410	+2.13%
2018	5,493	+4.49%
2023	6,054	+1.96%

Whitianga has grown rapidly since 1945, when it had a population of 443, with 1,427 in 1976 and 3,540 in 1996.

Whitianga had a population of 6,054 in the 2023 New Zealand census, an increase of 561 people (10.2%) since the 2018 census, and an increase of 1,644 people (37.3%) since the 2013 census. There were 3,000 males, 3,048 females and 6 people of other genders in 2,586 dwellings. 1.6% of people identified as LGBTIQ+. The median age was 54.2 years (compared with 38.1 years nationally). There were 831 people (13.7%) aged under 15 years, 717 (11.8%) aged 15 to 29, 2,526 (41.7%) aged 30 to 64, and 1,977 (32.7%) aged 65 or older.

People could identify as more than one ethnicity. The results were 89.6% European (Pākehā); 15.2% Māori; 2.7% Pasifika; 3.9% Asian; 0.6% Middle Eastern, Latin American and African New Zealanders (MELAA); and 2.3% other, which includes people giving their ethnicity as "New Zealander". English was spoken by 98.4%, Māori language by 2.7%, Samoan by 0.2%, and other languages by 6.9%. No language could be spoken by 1.2% (e.g. too young to talk). New Zealand Sign Language was known by 0.3%. The percentage of people born overseas was 19.1, compared with 28.8% nationally.

Religious affiliations were 28.2% Christian, 0.8% Hindu, 0.1% Islam, 0.6% Māori religious beliefs, 0.8% Buddhist, 0.3% New Age, 0.1% Jewish, and 1.2% other religions. People who answered that they had no religion were 59.6%, and 8.4% of people did not answer the census question.

Of those at least 15 years old, 765 (14.6%) people had a bachelor's or higher degree, 3,057 (58.5%) had a post-high school certificate or diploma, and 1,395 (26.7%) people exclusively held high school qualifications. The median income was $32,200, compared with $41,500 nationally. 357 people (6.8%) earned over $100,000 compared to 12.1% nationally. The employment status of those at least 15 was that 1,971 (37.7%) people were employed full-time, 855 (16.4%) were part-time, and 129 (2.5%) were unemployed.

Individual statistical areas
Name	Area (km^{2})	Population	Density (per km^{2})	Dwellings	Median age	Median income
Whitianga North	12.51	1,749	140	717	54.2 years	$34,600
Whitianga South	2.62	3,276	1,250	1,437	52.9 years	$30,900
Whitianga Waterways	2.06	1,029	500	432	58.6 years	$32,200
New Zealand					38.1 years	$41,500

== Geography ==
Whitianga is located on the eastern side of the Coromandel Peninsula, 191 km (119 mi) from Auckland (by road; 84 km direct distance), 93 km (58 mi) from Thames, 42 km (26 mi) from Tairua. It is situated on the coast of Mercury Bay along the 5 km (3 mi) long east-facing Buffalo Beach. In 1928 there was a controversy about changing the name of the town to Mercury Bay. On 21 June 2019 Whitianga was Gazetted as the official name. The town centre is at the southern end of the beach.

Buffalo Beach is named after HMS Buffalo, a Royal Navy ship which was wrecked during a storm while anchored in Mercury Bay. Her anchor can be seen at a monument at Buffalo Beach.

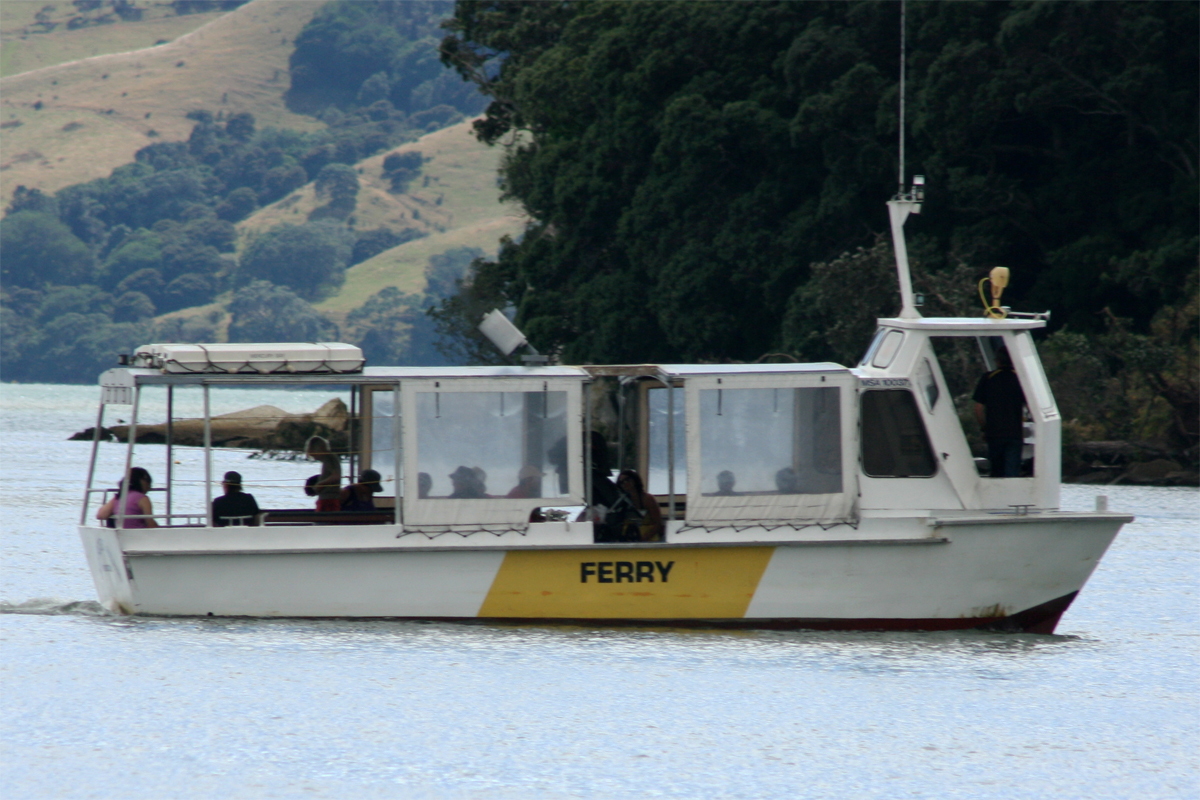
Whitianga Ferry, which crosses to Ferry Landing

A passenger ferry crosses from Whitianga to Ferry Landing, close to Cooks Beach. The alternative to the two-minute ferry crossing is a 45-minute drive around Whitianga Harbour.

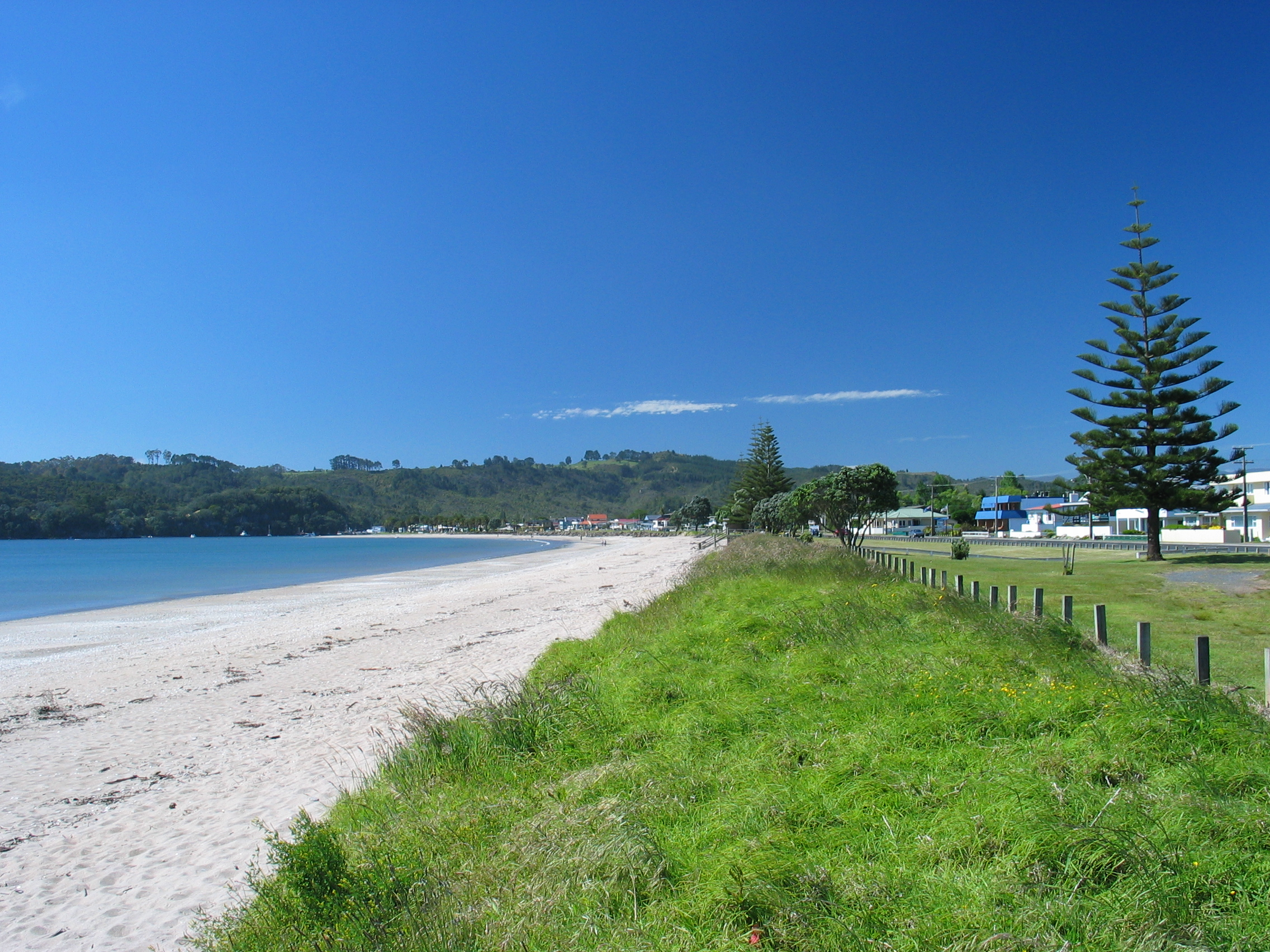
Buffalo Beach, Whitianga

=== Climate ===
Climate data for Whitianga Aero (1991–2020 normals, extremes 1990–present)
Month	Jan	Feb	Mar	Apr	May	Jun	Jul	Aug	Sep	Oct	Nov	Dec	Year
Record high °C (°F)	31.9 (89.4)	33.1 (91.6)	30.3 (86.5)	27.8 (82.0)	23.5 (74.3)	22.4 (72.3)	21.5 (70.7)	21.7 (71.1)	22.8 (73.0)	26.7 (80.1)	30.9 (87.6)	30.9 (87.6)	33.1 (91.6)
Mean maximum °C (°F)	27.9 (82.2)	28.0 (82.4)	26.1 (79.0)	24.0 (75.2)	21.1 (70.0)	19.1 (66.4)	17.6 (63.7)	18.5 (65.3)	20.1 (68.2)	22.1 (71.8)	24.3 (75.7)	26.2 (79.2)	28.7 (83.7)
Mean daily maximum °C (°F)	24.0 (75.2)	24.2 (75.6)	22.6 (72.7)	20.3 (68.5)	17.9 (64.2)	15.7 (60.3)	14.9 (58.8)	15.3 (59.5)	16.8 (62.2)	18.4 (65.1)	20.2 (68.4)	22.3 (72.1)	19.4 (66.9)
Daily mean °C (°F)	19.1 (66.4)	19.5 (67.1)	17.8 (64.0)	15.6 (60.1)	13.4 (56.1)	11.3 (52.3)	10.5 (50.9)	10.9 (51.6)	12.4 (54.3)	14.0 (57.2)	15.7 (60.3)	17.8 (64.0)	14.8 (58.7)
Mean daily minimum °C (°F)	14.2 (57.6)	14.8 (58.6)	12.9 (55.2)	10.8 (51.4)	8.9 (48.0)	6.9 (44.4)	6.0 (42.8)	6.5 (43.7)	8.0 (46.4)	9.7 (49.5)	11.2 (52.2)	13.2 (55.8)	10.3 (50.5)
Mean minimum °C (°F)	8.1 (46.6)	8.4 (47.1)	7.2 (45.0)	3.9 (39.0)	1.7 (35.1)	−0.3 (31.5)	−0.9 (30.4)	0.3 (32.5)	1.4 (34.5)	3.0 (37.4)	4.9 (40.8)	7.0 (44.6)	−1.5 (29.3)
Record low °C (°F)	4.4 (39.9)	3.6 (38.5)	1.0 (33.8)	−0.8 (30.6)	−2.5 (27.5)	−4.2 (24.4)	−2.6 (27.3)	−2.3 (27.9)	−1.3 (29.7)	−1.8 (28.8)	2.2 (36.0)	3.9 (39.0)	−4.2 (24.4)
Average rainfall mm (inches)	96.0 (3.78)	111.9 (4.41)	128.9 (5.07)	156.2 (6.15)	170.8 (6.72)	184.6 (7.27)	230.2 (9.06)	186.2 (7.33)	164.9 (6.49)	120.8 (4.76)	97.6 (3.84)	126.6 (4.98)	1,774.7 (69.86)
Source: NIWA

== History ==
=== Māori history ===
Whitianga has been continuously occupied for more than a thousand years since Māori explorer Kupe's iwi (tribe) settled here after his visit in about 950 AD. Following this visit, many of Kupe's tribe settled here. Te Whitianga o Kupe is the original place name of the town, meaning Kupe's crossing place.

Whitianga Pā, located on the ferry landing side of the river is a notable site. According to Ngāti Hei history, the earliest known chief occupying the rock was Hei Turepe. The pā is protected on three sides by sheer cliffs. The hill leading up to the pā on the fourth side is defended by a 22-foot man-made ditch which is now part of the track leading down to Back Bay where pā inhabitants had access to shellfish. On Cook's visit to the site in November 1769, the inhabitants who welcomed him believed the pā had been disused for a generation since it had been attacked by a Tauranga chief who married the slain chief's wife and settled peacefully into the area. Whitianga rock has several holes cut into the stone that were used as firepits, water stores, and palisade holes. Cook noted burnt palisade stumps as evidence that an earlier attack had evicted the ancient pā's residents.

=== Captain Cook's visit – 1769 ===
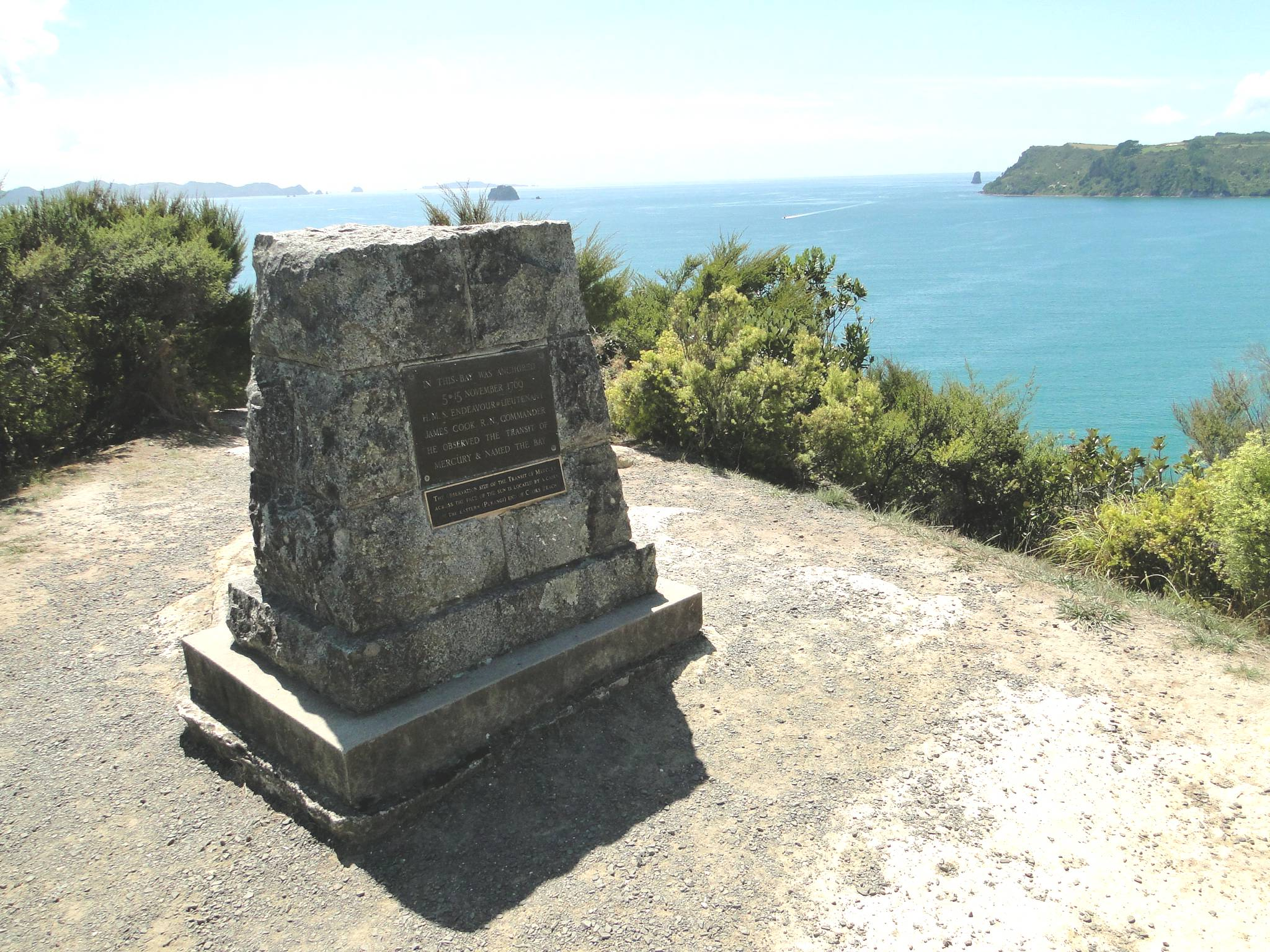
Cairn at Cook's Beach to commemorate Cook's observation of the transit of Mercury

The people of Hei commemorated their leader in a few place names, one being the bay at the head of which he had settled, Te Whanganui A Hei, (the Great Bay of Hei). This large sheltered bay was later renamed by Captain James Cook when he came here in November 1769 to observe the transit of Mercury. Cook was accompanied by Charles Green, the Royal Society expedition astronomer who died on the homeward journey in 1771.

From Cook's journal – "my reasons for putting in here were the hopes of discerning a good harbour and the desire I had of being in some convenient place to observe the Transit of Mercury, which happens on the 9th instant and will be wholly visible here if the day is clear between 5 and 6 o'clock." Cook also named the Whitianga Harbour "River of Mangroves" and this area is still referred to as "The River".

The sighting of the Transit of Mercury is commemorated at Cooks Beach by a cairn of Coromandel granite which tells the story: "In this bay was anchored 5 Nov 1769, HMS Endeavour, Lieutenant James Cook RN, Commander. He observed the transit of Mercury and named this bay."

=== European settlement ===
The original European settlement was situated on the opposite side of the river from approximately 1836 to 1881.

Whitianga stone wharf, built in 1838 on that east bank of the river, is the oldest remaining wharf in the country. It served a timber mill and shipbuilding yard. It was renovated in 2015. The ferry across the river uses the wharf as its eastern terminal.

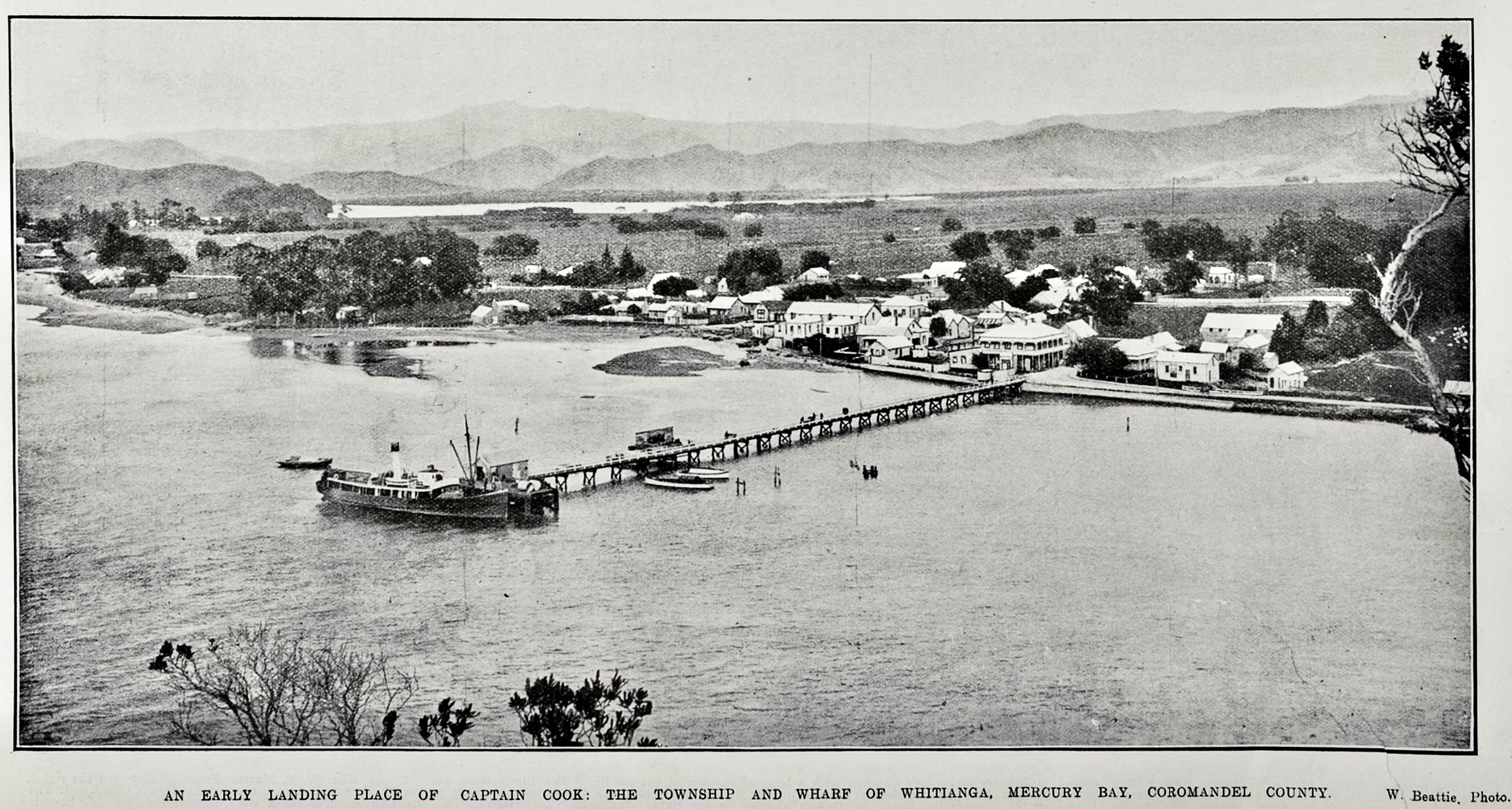
Whitianga hotel wharf about 1913

Whitianga hotel wharf was built in the early 1870s. Coromandel County Council took formal ownership of it in 1926. By 1927 there were complaints that it was silting up. On 4 March 1932 a replacement was completed. It was removed in May 1964. SS Fingal was launched in 1879 to serve Tauranga, Mercury Bay and Tairua and became part of the Northern Steamship Company fleet in 1881. Their weekly service from Auckland ended about 1947. The Minister of Conservation approved construction of a marina in the former wharf area on 24 November 1992.

HMS Buffalo is a wreck in Mercury Bay; this ship was the first ship to settle the people of the Adelaide company who established the city of Adelaide in South Australia.

== Industry ==
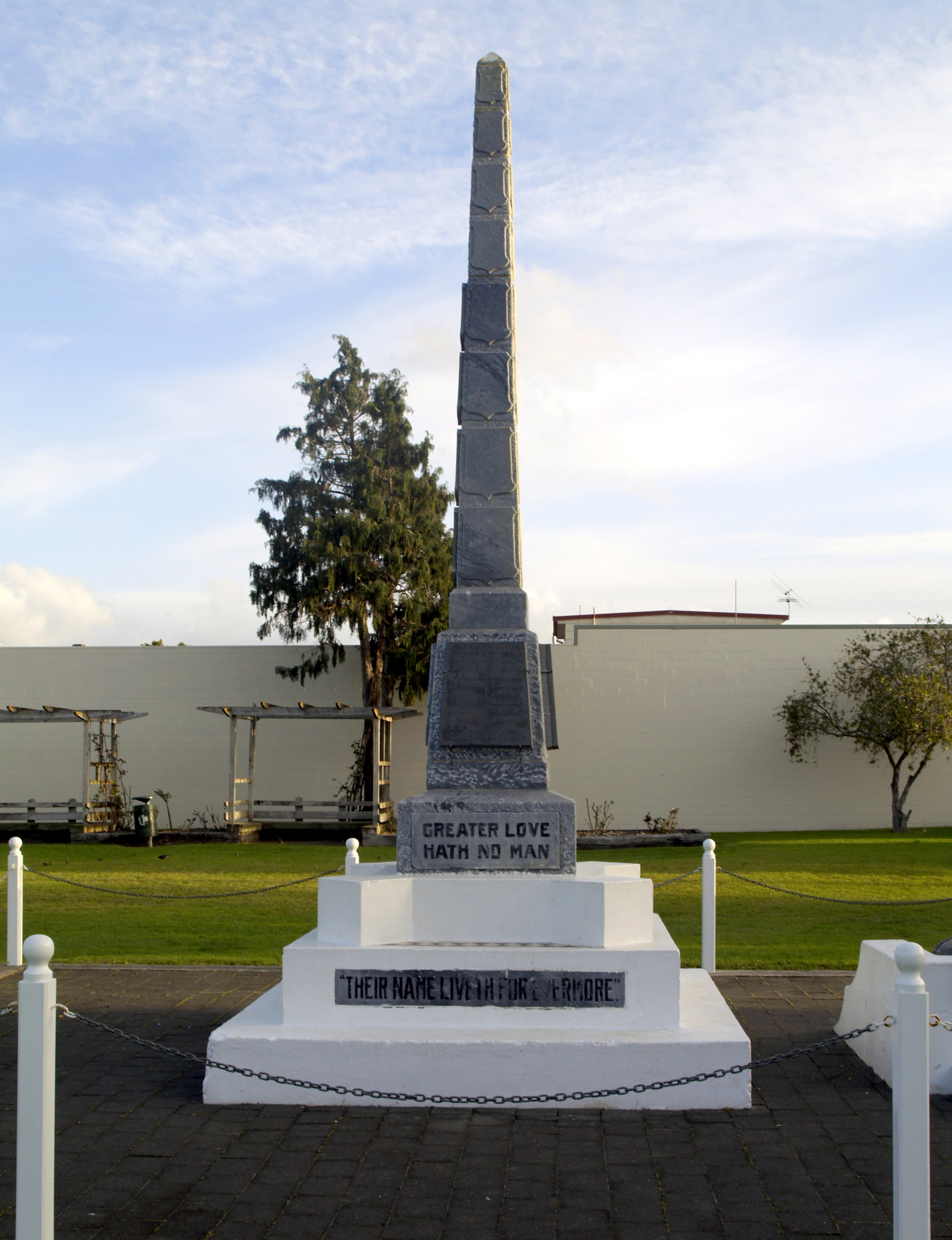
Whitianga War Memorial obelisk

Historically, Whitianga was a centre for boat building, kauri milling, flax milling, gold mining and gum digging. For many years, it was a leading timber port, with sailing ships from Norway, Sweden, France, Italy and Great Britain coming to load timber. Overseas vessels of 2000 tons with a draught of 18" and carrying with their decks loads over a million feet of timber worked the harbour entrance. The larger ships were towed into the port from near Centre Island. Over a period of sixty years, it is estimated over 500 million feet of kauri was exported from the Whitianga district.

The first kauri gum was exported in 1844. It reached its peak in 1899 when over 11,000 long tons of gum was exported at an average of $120 per ton.

Today Whitianga serves as a small regional centre for the eastern side of the Coromandel Peninsula and Mercury Bay area. It is a focal point for local fishing, farming and tourism industry, such as the nearby Te Whanganui-A-Hei (Cathedral Cove) marine reserve and associated famous beach and cave. Cathedral Cove was used in the movie The Chronicles of Narnia: Prince Caspian.

The area surrounding Whitianga (222 square km) is currently under a mineral prospecting license granted by the Crown to mining company Waihi Gold (a subsidiary of Newmont Corporation Colorado, USA).

== Social ==
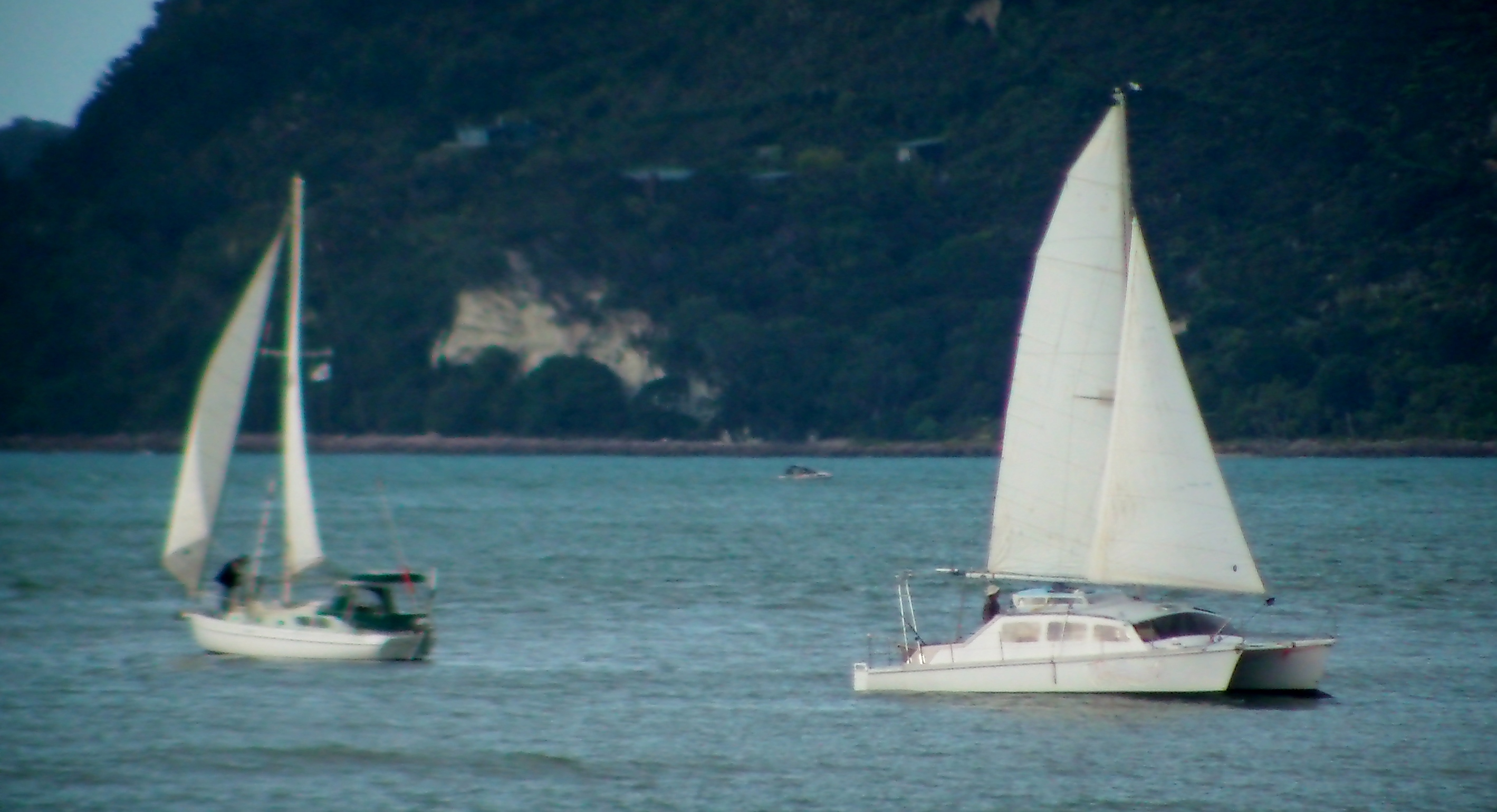
Two boats sailing off Buffalo Beach

74.8% of Whitianga residents are New Zealand born, 85.1% identify as European, and 17% are of Maori descent. Whitianga has a relatively large number of older residents. 32.3% of residents are aged 60 years and over (the New Zealand average for this age group is 19.8%). It also has a large number of baches or holiday homes. 39.1% of the private dwellings in Whitianga were unoccupied on Census night, 2013. (By contrast, the average number of unoccupied dwellings in New Zealand was 11.1%).

In 2013 Whitianga had an unemployment level of 6.2%, lower than the national average of 7.1. 36.2% of households with income were in the lowest quartile, earning under $33,000 (versus 25% of people nationwide), 33.5% in the medium lowest (versus 25% nationwide), 21% in the medium highest (versus 25% nationwide), and 9.4% earned income over $109,431 which put them in the highest quartile (versus 25% nationwide). Whitianga scored 1008 on the Social Deprivation Index.

== Education ==
Mercury Bay Area School is a coeducational composite (years 1–13) school with a roll of 868 as of July 2026. The first primary school opened in the area in 1872. A District High School opened in 1951 and moved to the present site two years later. In February 1981 it became an area school.

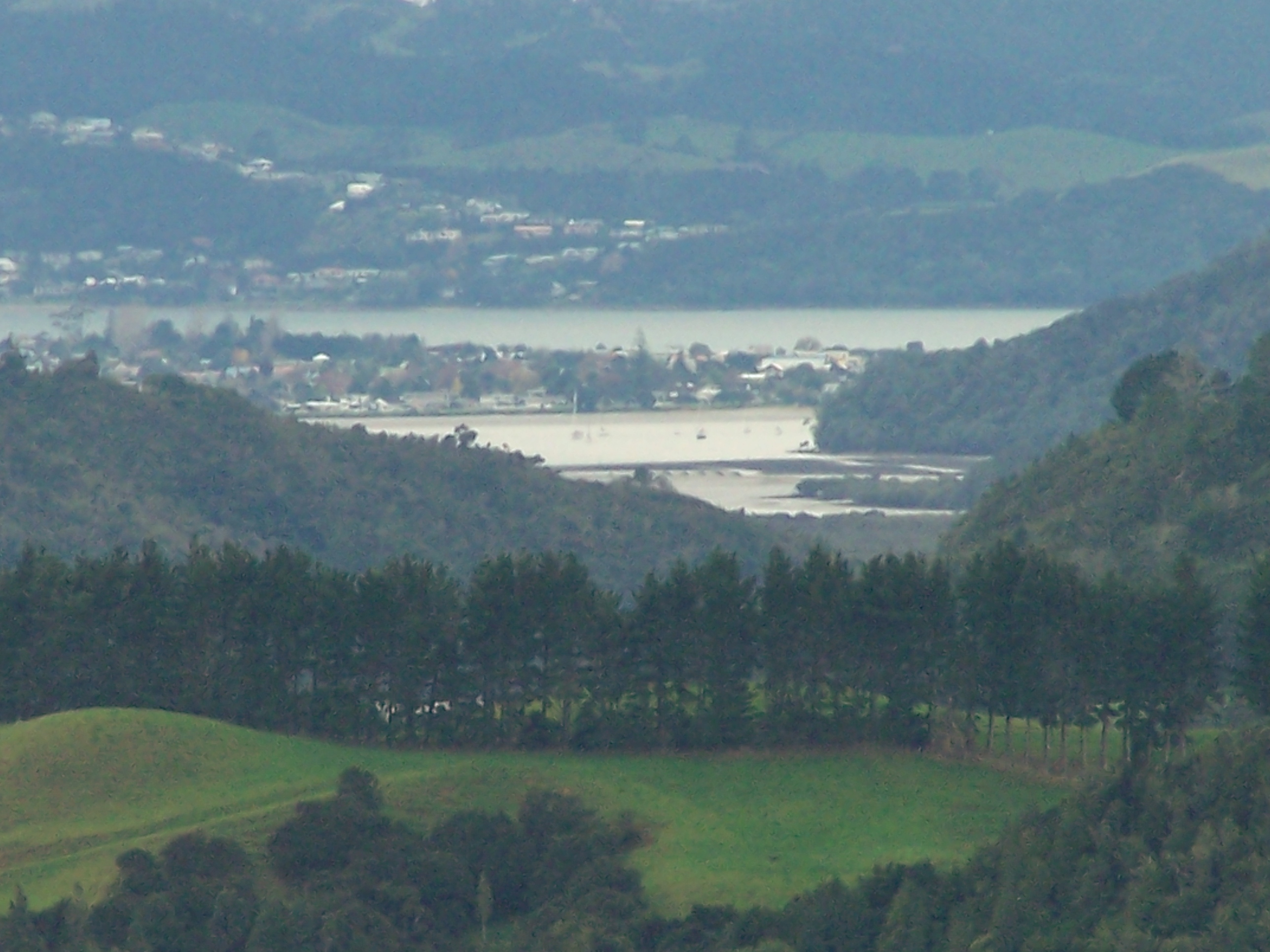
A view of Whitianga from the surrounding hills.

== Transport ==
Whitianga is served by State Highway 25, the main highway looping around the Coromandel Peninsula. It is also served by the small Whitianga Aerodrome, which receives flights by Air Auckland with their Cessna 172 and 206 on a regular basis, FlyStark with their Cessna 172 and GippsAero GA8 Airvan aeroplanes and Sunair with their Cessna 172 and Piper Aztec planes. InterCity buses and Go Kiwi Shuttle serve the community with transportation to Whitianga from Thames, Auckland and other locations around the Coromandel Peninsula and North Island.

== Media ==
Whitianga is served by The Mercury Bay Informer, The Hauraki Herald, Coromandel's More FM, and Coromandel's CFM.

== Events ==
An annual scallop festival is held in September every year to celebrate seafood, particularly scallops.

The Whitianga Speed Festival was held in 2009 and 2010.

A New Year's Eve festival and concert, known as Coromandel Gold, was held from 2009 to 2012.
