= Ngāti Hei =

Māori iwi (tribe) in Aotearoa New Zealand

- Iwi (tribe) in Māoridom

Ngāti Hei is a Māori iwi of New Zealand.

Ngāti Hei is generally recognised as the dominant tribe of the Mercury Bay area. There has always been much speculation as to the origins of Māori people. Historians agree that Māori arrived in Aotearoa from place in the South Pacific Ocean called Hawaiiki, but its exact location has been the subject of much debate and speculation.

By contrast, Ngāti Hei has much more definite ideas about whence they came. Ngāti Hei can trace its roots to the arrival of Kupe, the great navigator, who sailed from Tahiti to Aotearoa in 950AD and whose presence is commemorated in place names around the district. Ngāti Hei is named for the esteemed spiritual tauira (authority) Hei Te Arawa, who sailed with Kupe to Aotearoa on the waka.

Ngāti Hei were reputed to be peaceable seafaring people. Unfortunately throughout history they endured much suffering at the hands of raiding parties who repeatedly stripped Ngāti Hei of their assets and slaughtered them with muskets.

Today Ngāti Hei numbers just 300. Their legends speak of Kupe coming to these shores from Ra'iātea (Tahiti) aboard the waka Matahourua in the tenth century.

A lesser known place name is Koko-ia-Kupe—a snug little bay on Whakau (Red Mercury Island). The Māori name was later displaced by Von Luckners Cove, after an incident during World War I.

These two place names are the only enduring reminders of the Tahitian Polynesian on the Hauraki Peninsula. There is a place on Ra'iātea, in the leeward Tahitian group, named Hitiaa O Te Ra—the same word as the Māori Whitianga.

Another significant historical marker showing the migration of the Tahitians is the name of a headland pa and small stream near Whitianga. The name is Tapu Tapu Atea—which was also the name of Kupe's great international temple at Opoa on the island of Ra'iātea. In the mid 19th century, this temple—famous for its ceremonial feasts—was the home of Polynesian knowledge and instruction.

It was Kupe who named this place at Whitianga, where the stream used to flow out onto Buffalo Beach, immediately below the ancient pa. The old temple at Opoa on Ra'iātea is said to be the marae matua, which still stands today on the low, wide cape overlooking Akaroa Bay.

After Kupe returned to Tahiti, there were other voyages to Aotearoa, including one led by Toi. The entire Coromandel Peninsula is known as Te Paeroa-o-Toi, the long mountain ridge of Toi, and was well-populated after Kupe's time by the so-called Māoriori, or Mauriuri—a people descendant of Maui or Te-Tini-o-Maui.

They intermingled with some of Kupe's people and became known as Maruiwi having descended from an ancestor of that name. Nga Maruiwi clashed with Toi's people when they arrived about 1150 AD.

The tribe's strategic location made it a target for raiding parties paddling up and down the east coast. In the 17th century, land was lost through assimilation, escalating to more hostile raids in the 18th and 19th centuries. Hostilities continued unabated from 1769 to 1838 when peace was finally made with the Ngāpuhi.

Later came European colonists with their timber trade, the gold rush, gum digging, and a hunger for land.

Successive settler governments and their legislation finally wrested from Ngāti Hei the lands to which they had so tenaciously clung. Apart from our tūrangawaewae land at Wharekaho, the only other land retained until relatively recent times (1930) was parts of Kauanga-Whenuakite.

Ohinau Island—taken by the Crown in 1923 without investigation of title in the Māori Land Court—was returned to Ngāti Hei in February 1995.

== See also ==
- List of Māori iwi
