= Hauraki Plains County =

Former county of New Zealand

Coordinates: 37°16′33″S 175°29′25″E

- County of New Zealand
- 1920–1989
- Capital: Ngatea
- History
  - Established: 1920
  - Disestablished: 1989
- Today part of: Hauraki District Council and Matamata-Piako District

Hauraki Plains County was one of the counties of New Zealand on the North Island covering the Hauraki Plains area.

Hauraki Plains County was formed from the part of Ohinemuri County, west of the Waihou River, on 9 January 1920, initially with 5 ridings, which was increased to 10 (Kopuarahi, Turua, Horahia, Kerepeehi, Netherton, Tahuna, Patetonga, Ngatea, Pipiroa and Waitakaruru) in 1923, each with a councillor.

The County office at Ngatea was originally in a shed south of the Piako River bridge, beside the home of the first county clerk. Chambers were built near the bridge, of concrete, in 1924, with E E Gillman as the architect. They were replaced by new offices and a library from 27 September 1973.

In the 1989 reorganisation, Ohinemuri County, Hauraki Plains County and Waihi and Paeroa Boroughs amalgamated to form Hauraki District Council from 1 November 1989.

== See also ==
- List of former territorial authorities in New Zealand § Counties
