= Kopuarahi =

Coordinates: 37.220°S 175.504°E

Kopuarahi is a rural settlement and farming community in the Hauraki District and Waikato region of New Zealand's North Island.

The settlement is located on the outskirts of Thames, between Pipiroa and Kopu, on State Highway 25. It is situated at the north-eastern corner of the Hauraki Plains, just south of the Firth of Thames, just east of the Piako River, and west of the Waihou River.

== History ==
=== Early history ===
The Ngāti Hako people traditionally had a pā (defensive settlement) in the area. The pā site was discovered in a swampy area in 1920 and many rare artefacts were discovered, but the site was not fully excavated until 1956.

The Kopuarahi District was established in 1911.

=== Modern history ===
The Kopuarahi Cheese Factory was built in 1916 to produce cheese from the milk of local dairy farms. When milk tankers began transporting milk to a dairy factory in Kerepehi in 1956, the building was converted into a community hall. The hall is available for hire for private events.

The Kopuarahi School Second World War Memorial flagstaff was erected in April 1947 to commemorate two local men, who were killed in World War II.

A woman was critically injured, when her car was struck by a road sweeping truck in Kopuarahi in January 2012.

A 4.3 magnitude quake was felt in Kopuarahi in September 2020.

In 2021, Kopuarahi School reported increasing poverty among students. The principal said a lack of food and basic supplies had affected student learning.

== Education ==
Kopuarahi School is a co-educational state primary school, with a roll of 8 as of July 2026.

The school celebrated its 50th anniversary in 1967, and marked its centenary in 2017.
