= Mayor of Waihi =

The mayor of Waihi officiated over the Waihi Borough of New Zealand. The borough was administered by the Waihi Borough Council. The initial office existed from 1902 until 1989, when Waihi Borough became Hauraki District as part of the 1989 local government reforms. There have been 12 mayors of Waihi.

== List of mayors ==
	Name	Term
1	W.H. Phillips	1902–1904
2	T. Gilmour	1904–1908
3	John Newth	1908–1913
4	M.G. Power	1913–1915
5	Dawson Donaldson	1915–1923
6	W.M. Walnutt	1923 – 1 August 1947
7	Sam Bonnici	1 August 1947 – October 1947
8	H.J. (Snow) Pickett	October 1947 – 1956
9	Chris Christensen	1956–1965
10	Albert Thomas	1965–1971
11	Alan Dean	1971–1977
12	Owen Morgan	1977–1989
