= Piako =

Piako may refer to the following in New Zealand:

- Matamata-Piako District, a local government area
- Piako County, a former local government area
- Piako River, a river system that drains into the Firth of Thames
- Piako Swamp, another name for the Hauraki Plains
- Piako (New Zealand electorate), a former parliamentary electorate
