= Kaihere =

- Interactive map of Kaihere
- Coordinates: 37°22′S 175°25′E
- Country: New Zealand
- Region: Waikato region
- District: Hauraki District
- Ward: Plains Ward
- Electorates: Coromandel; Hauraki-Waikato (Māori)

Government
  - Territorial Authority: Hauraki District Council
  - Regional council: Waikato Regional Council
  - Mayor of Thames-Coromandel: Peter Revell
  - Coromandel MP: Scott Simpson
  - Hauraki-Waikato MP: Hana-Rawhiti Maipi-Clarke

Area
  - Total: 16.89 km^{2} (6.52 sq mi)

Population (2023 Census)
  - Total: 135
  - Density: 7.99/km^{2} (20.7/sq mi)

Kaihere is a dispersed Waikato rural settlement on SH27, overlooking the Hauraki Plains. It has a school, hall, domain and a rest area. It is the starting point for the Hapuakohe Walkway.

== Demographics ==
Kaihere is in an SA1 statistical area which covers 16.89 km^{2} (6.52 sq mi). The SA1 area is included in the demographics for Hauraki Plains South.

Historical population for Kaihere and surrounds
Year	Pop.	±% p.a.
2001	114	—
2006	123	+1.53%
2013	135	+1.34%
2018	147	+1.72%
2023	135	−1.69%

The SA1 area had a population of 135 in the 2023 New Zealand census, a decrease of 12 people (−8.2%) since the 2018 census, and unchanged since the 2013 census. There were 69 males and 69 females in 45 dwellings. 2.2% of people identified as LGBTIQ+. The median age was 37.3 years (compared with 38.1 years nationally). There were 36 people (26.7%) aged under 15 years, 18 (13.3%) aged 15 to 29, 63 (46.7%) aged 30 to 64, and 15 (11.1%) aged 65 or older.

People could identify as more than one ethnicity. The results were 88.9% European (Pākehā), 6.7% Māori, 2.2% Pasifika, 13.3% Asian, and 4.4% other, which includes people giving their ethnicity as "New Zealander". English was spoken by 95.6%, and other languages by 6.7%. No language could be spoken by 4.4% (e.g. too young to talk). The percentage of people born overseas was 22.2, compared with 28.8% nationally.

Religious affiliations were 26.7% Christian, 6.7% Hindu, 2.2% Buddhist, and 2.2% other religions. People who answered that they had no religion were 51.1%, and 11.1% of people did not answer the census question.

Of those at least 15 years old, 18 (18.2%) people had a bachelor's or higher degree, 57 (57.6%) had a post-high school certificate or diploma, and 30 (30.3%) people exclusively held high school qualifications. The median income was $41,900, compared with $41,500 nationally. 6 people (6.1%) earned over $100,000 compared to 12.1% nationally. The employment status of those at least 15 was that 54 (54.5%) people were employed full-time, 12 (12.1%) were part-time, and 6 (6.1%) were unemployed.

== Geology ==
The village lies on the edge of greywacke, of the Jurassic Manaia Hill Group, and the peat of the Hauraki graben. Much of the village is built on the Pliocene Puketoka formation between those. That formation has boulders of andesite, quartz vein-stone, cryptocrystalline silica, and banded rhyolite, with cobbles of greywacke, in a poorly cemented bed of pumice silt. The Hauraki rift probably started about 3 million years ago. Subsidence now is about 1.5 mm (0.059 in) a year.

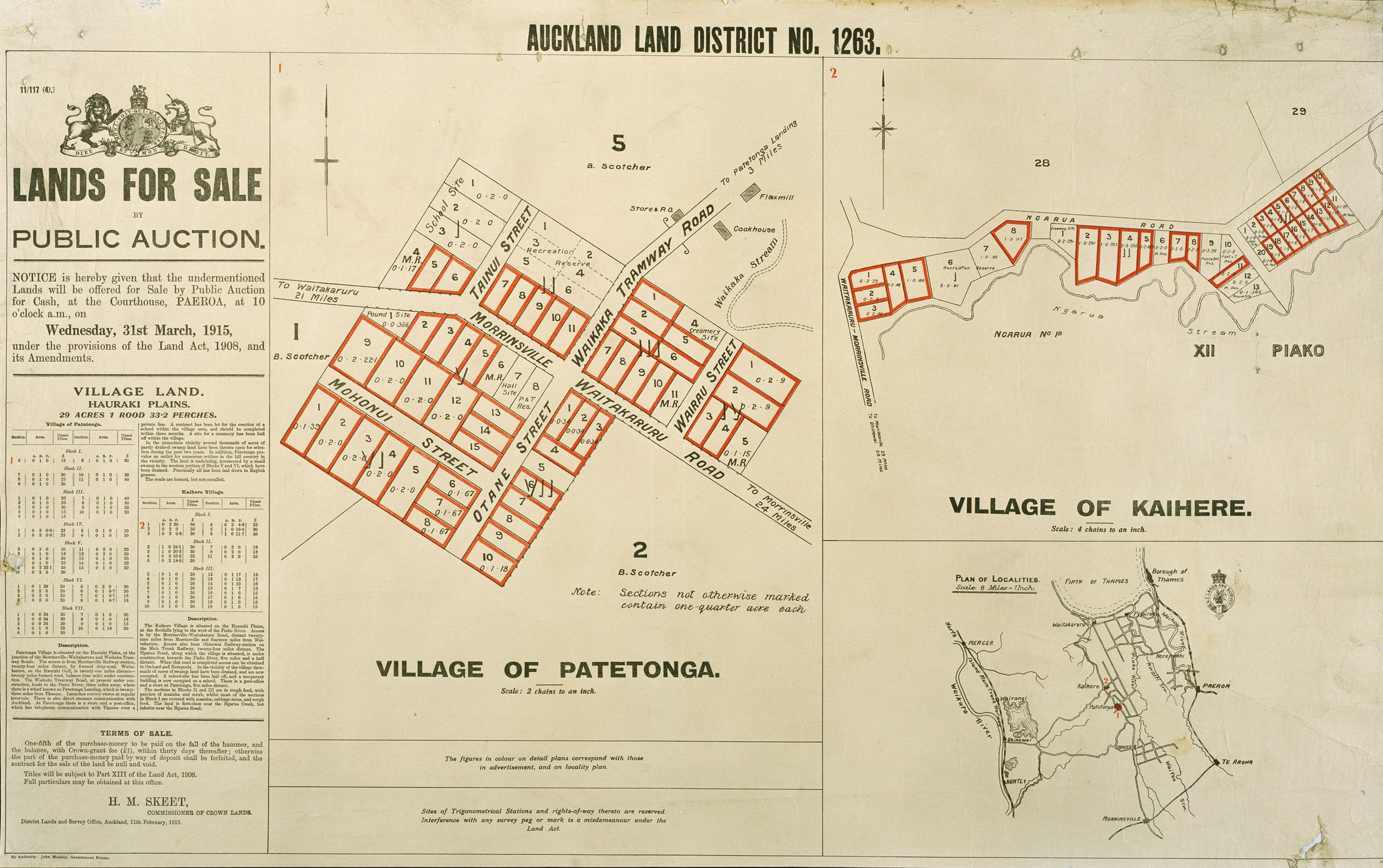
1915 Patetonga and Kaihere plans and notice of auction

== History ==
The early inhabitants largely used the wetlands for fishing. Ngāti Hako and Ngāti Pāoa lived in the area when early settlers arrived. The Musket Wars caused much disruption in the 1820s.

Government gradually bought the wetlands, including Kaihere, until it controlled enough to enact the Hauraki Plains Act 1908. In 1906 work started on a road to Ohinewai and on cutting the bends in the Piako River below Kaihere Landing. From 1908 stopbanks and drainage canals were built. By March 1915 38,994 acres (15,780 ha) had been sold to 294 farmers, mainly for dairying.

Flax was milled at Kaihere from the 1890s to the 1940s. Flax growing was set back by fires, which were a problem as the peat dried out, following drainage.

A 2018 plan will strengthen stopbanks and diversion ponds below Kaihere.

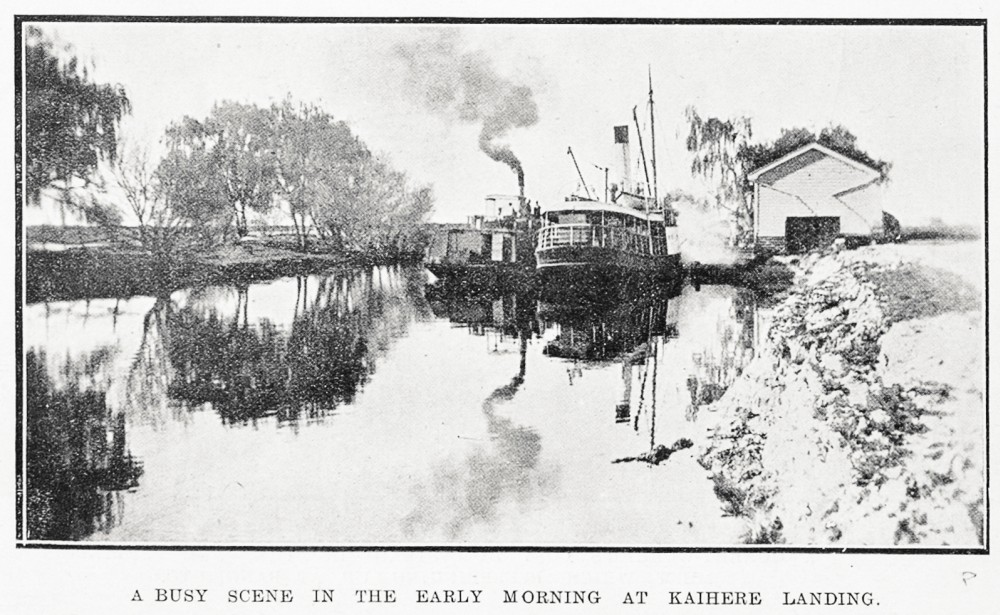
1922 steamers at Kaihere Landing

== Transport ==
A telemetry box on SH27, 1.4 km (0.87 mi) south of Kaihere recorded average traffic up by 31% in the decade 2008 to 2017, from 3,965 to 5,182. 982 (19%) of those were heavy vehicles, mainly trucks.

Until 1941 Northern Steamships linked Kaihere Landing with Auckland thrice weekly. Some of the landing is still visible.

== Education ==
Kaihere School is a 2-class rural primary school, with a roll of 32 as of July 2025.

The school has a fort, native bush walk, playing field, netball court and a pool. It is a Silver Enviroschool.

== War memorial pavilion ==
The 1929 Kaihere war memorial pavilion is listed as Category: A - Heritage Feature in Hauraki District Plan. It is a small timber gabled box cottage, in front of the 1917 Community Hall, with kauri bench seats under the veranda. It was moved from the Domain in Ohinewai Road to the school in 2005, was used by the Woman's Institute and was intended as a library and sports pavilion. A new memorial was dedicated on 25 April 2006, with the moved First World War cairn, a new one for World War 2 and a settlers memorial wall.
