= Waitakaruru River =

Coordinates: 37°14′S 175°24′E

Location
- Country: New Zealand

Physical characteristics
- Source
  - location: Hapuakohe Range
- Mouth
  - location: Firth of Thames
- Length: 15 km (9.3 mi)

The Waitakaruru River is a river of the Waikato Region of New Zealand's North Island. It flows initially north before turning northwest across the northwestern corner of the Hauraki Plains, reaching the southwestern corner of the Firth of Thames close to the settlement of Waitakaruru.

Grey mangrove, or mānawa, has rapidly colonised the estuary since 1940, due to sediment deposited by the rivers and climate change.

== Pollution ==
In its lower reaches the river is not fit for swimming, as the nitrogen and phosphorus pollution levels are many times those of the natural river.

Pollution has generally been worsening, as shown in this table -

Relative seasonal Kendall slope estimator (RSKSE) trends (% per year). Important (i.e. slope direction probability over 95% and RSKSE over ±1% pa) improvements, or deteriorations in bold.
| | Conductivity | Turbidity | Visual clarity | Total nitrogen | Nitrate-N | Ammonia | Total phosphorus (provisional) | Dissolved reactive P | Escherichia coli |
|---|---|---|---|---|---|---|---|---|---|
| **1993–2017** | **1.1** | **–1.8** | **1.9** | **–1.5** | **–1.8** | **–3.6** | **–1.6** | –0.7 | –2.0 |
| **2008–2017** | –0.4 | **–4.2** | **7.6** | **–2.6** | **–1.5** | **–3.0** | **–3.9** | **–2.3** | **–7.3** |

Monthly records are flow-adjusted using a Lowess curve fit with 30% span.

== See also ==
- List of rivers of New Zealand
