= Awaiti =

Locality in Hauraki District, Waikato Region, New Zealand

Coordinates: 37.4071976°S 175.56893°E

Awaiti is a rural community in the Hauraki District and Waikato region of New Zealand's North Island, west of Paeroa.

Awaiti is a Māori word, meaning "little stream".

== Geography ==
The area is predominantly farmland.

Two canals, Awaiti and Bancrofts, drain from the Kopuatai Peat Dome and surrounding farmland into Tee Head Canal in the Piako River system. The canals have low biodiversity, with a small population of fish that can tolerate the low-quality water.

== History ==
=== Early history ===
Awaiti is in the rohe (traditional tribal area) of the Ngāti Tamaterā people. There were previously two pā (defensive settlements) in the area; one became a tapu (sacred) burial ground.

Europeans began cattle farming in Awaiti in the late 19th century. In the 1890s, it was a place of "mud and wet and cows" that was only accessible by the river. Ngāti Tamaterā farmed pigs and horses.

At the turn of the century, local Māori and Pākehā regularly gathered for social events, including a New Year's Eve sports day.

=== Modern history ===
Following the end of World War I in 1918, six returned servicemen settled farms in the area.

By the 1970s, the area had sealed roads, electricity, and tanker milk delivery to a dairy factory.

There was a small scrub fire in the area in late December 2020. It may have been caused by lightning from a thunderstorm that passed the area at the time.
