= Whiritoa =

Settlement in Waikato, New Zealand

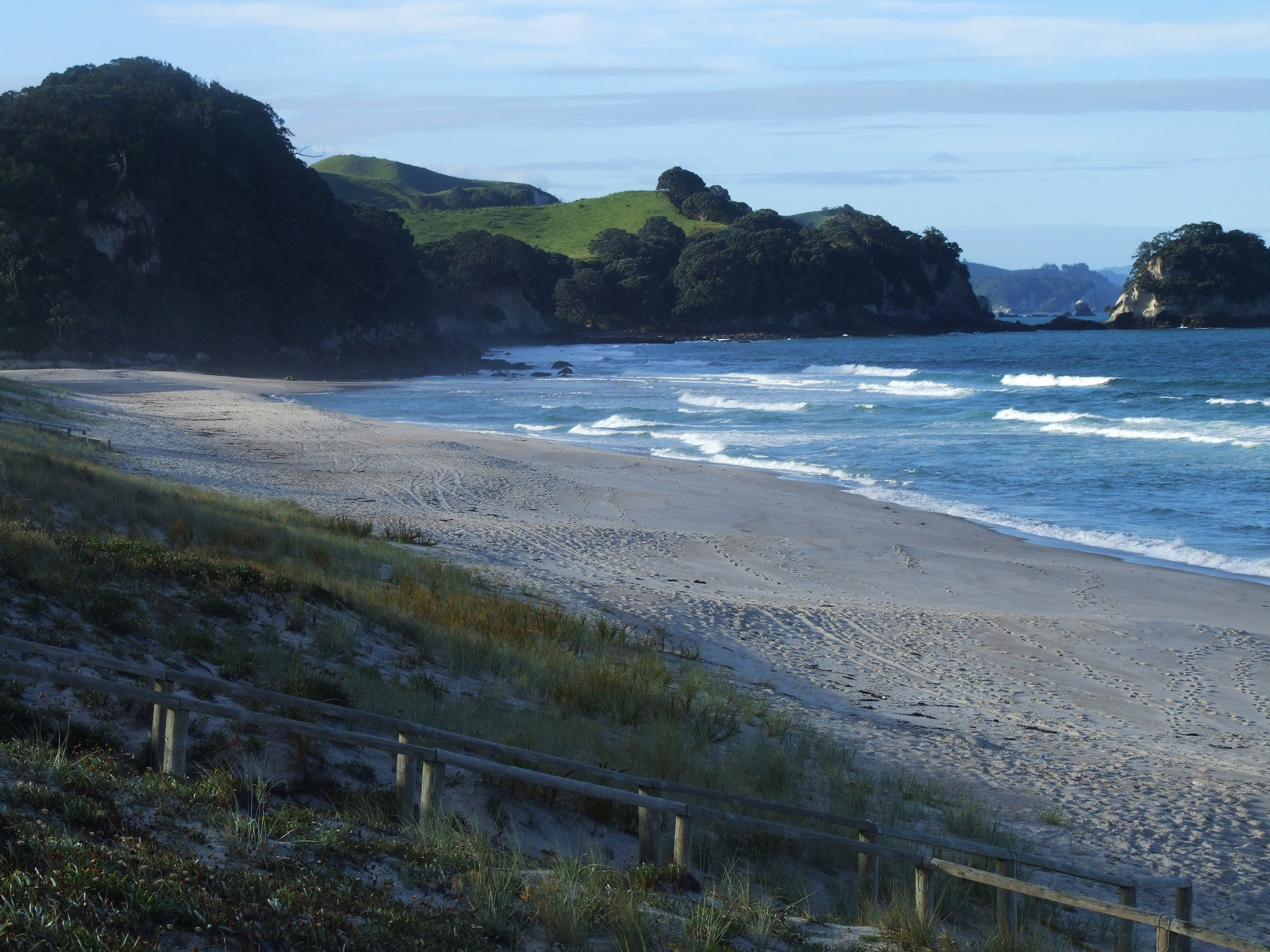
- Whiritoa Beach
- Interactive map of Whiritoa
- Coordinates: 37°16′58″S 175°54′03″E
- Country: New Zealand
- Region: Waikato region
- District: Hauraki District
- Ward: Waihi Ward
- Electorates: Coromandel; Hauraki-Waikato (Māori)

Government
  - Territorial Authority: Hauraki District Council
  - Regional council: Waikato Regional Council
  - Mayor of Thames-Coromandel: Peter Revell
  - Coromandel MP: Scott Simpson
  - Hauraki-Waikato MP: Hana-Rawhiti Maipi-Clarke

Area
  - Total: 0.91 km^{2} (0.35 sq mi)

Population (June 2025)
  - Total: 280
  - Density: 310/km^{2} (800/sq mi)

Whiritoa is a small beach town on the Coromandel Peninsula, New Zealand between Whangamatā and Waihi Beach. It has a permanent population in the low hundreds, which swells to over a thousand during the New Year holiday period.

It has a convenience store, a library and a volunteer fire department. The local Surf lifesaving club has a close relationship with the community of regularly holidaying families.

At the north end of the 1.5 km beach is a small lagoon and past this is a short walk to Waimama bay. The lagoon has a cycle of being blocked by sand then being dug out by the council digger or enthusiastic members of the public. At the south end a short bush walk crosses through privately owned land to a blowhole.

The beach itself is popular for surfers as it often features a roaming sandbar or two. The shore is often quite steep meaning the waves are sometimes breaking directly on the sand making it difficult for casual swimmers.

== History ==
Whiritoa beach is typical of many beaches along the eastern Coromandel Peninsula, starting its formation around 6,000 to 7,000 years ago.

Early Māori communities removed most of the original coastal forest and dune plants. Farmers then introduced stock to the dune area, disturbing the native sand-binding grasses and causing severe wind erosion. Most of the sand reserves eroded, reducing the height of the dunes and caused sheets of sand to move more than 200 m inland. The sand at Whiritoa Beach was mined for over 50 years; in total more than 180,000 m³ of sand has been removed. Since the 1960s coastal subdivision has covered most of what remains of the sand dune reserves.

== Demographics ==
Whiritoa is described by Statistics New Zealand as a rural settlement. It covers 0.91 km^{2} (0.35 sq mi) and had an estimated population of 280 as of June 2025, with a population density of 308 people per km^{2}. It is part of the larger Waihi Rural statistical area.

Historical population
Year	Pop.	±% p.a.
2006	198	—
2013	168	−2.32%
2018	216	+5.15%
2023	264	+4.10%

Whiritoa had a population of 264 in the 2023 New Zealand census, an increase of 48 people (22.2%) since the 2018 census, and an increase of 96 people (57.1%) since the 2013 census. There were 126 males, 138 females and 3 people of other genders in 99 dwellings. 2.3% of people identified as LGBTIQ+. The median age was 60.8 years (compared with 38.1 years nationally). There were 21 people (8.0%) aged under 15 years, 24 (9.1%) aged 15 to 29, 117 (44.3%) aged 30 to 64, and 102 (38.6%) aged 65 or older.

People could identify as more than one ethnicity. The results were 90.9% European (Pākehā), 13.6% Māori, 2.3% Pasifika, 1.1% Asian, and 6.8% other, which includes people giving their ethnicity as "New Zealander". English was spoken by 100.0%, Māori language by 2.3%, and other languages by 4.5%. No language could be spoken by 1.1% (e.g. too young to talk). New Zealand Sign Language was known by 1.1%. The percentage of people born overseas was 19.3, compared with 28.8% nationally.

Religious affiliations were 36.4% Christian, 1.1% Hindu, 2.3% Buddhist, and 2.3% other religions. People who answered that they had no religion were 52.3%, and 6.8% of people did not answer the census question.

Of those at least 15 years old, 39 (16.0%) people had a bachelor's or higher degree, 144 (59.3%) had a post-high school certificate or diploma, and 63 (25.9%) people exclusively held high school qualifications. The median income was $28,000, compared with $41,500 nationally. 21 people (8.6%) earned over $100,000 compared to 12.1% nationally. The employment status of those at least 15 was that 66 (27.2%) people were employed full-time, 48 (19.8%) were part-time, and 15 (6.2%) were unemployed.
