= Thames Valley, New Zealand =

Coordinates: 37.1482782°S 175.5529156°E

The Thames Valley is a non-administrative region in the North Island of New Zealand. Broadly, it is the valley component of the Waihou River catchment (which was formerly known as the Thames River). The lower part of the valley is more commonly known as the Hauraki Plains. Geographically the valley extends as far as the Hinuera Gap, although this is not often referred to as such. In geographical history of New Zealand, the Thames Valley was the path of the ancestral Waikato River when it discharged into the Firth of Thames over 20,000 years ago.

For local government administration, the Thames Valley is fully contained within the Waikato region, and is split between the Thames-Coromandel, Hauraki and Matamata-Piako Districts.

The region's principal industry is dairy farming and is considered to be some of the most intensively farmed dairying areas in the world. The main towns are Thames, Paeroa, Ngatea and Te Aroha. While geographically the towns of Morrinsville and Matamata are also located within the Thames Valley, they are not typically treated as such, and their rugby clubs are affiliated with the Waikato provincial union.

The Thames Valley Rugby Team, known as the Swamp Foxes, play in the New Zealand Provincial Rugby Heartland Competition.
