= Mackaytown =

Settlement in Hauraki District, New Zealand

Coordinates: 37.411°S 175.707°E

Mackaytown is a settlement in the Hauraki District and Waikato region of New Zealand's North Island, located at the north-western end of the Karangahake Gorge just south of Paeroa.

It is named after local Government administrator and politician James Mackay.

The settlement consists of eight roads branching off State Highway 2. It is bordered by Turner's Hill, Doherty's Creek, Ohinemuri River, and the sacred Tapu Ariki burial grounds on Te Moananui's Hill.

== History ==
=== Pre-European history ===
The Ohinemuri River is within the rohe (traditional tribal area) of Ngāti Hako and Ngāti Tara Tokanui. Ohinemuri is a Māori word, meaning "the girl left behind", referring to a legend about a chief's daughter who was detained by a taniwha at Turner's Hill.

Early Māori settlers travelled the area extensively, mostly by waka (canoes), but also by crossing the forest and stream fords on foot. Missionary Samuel Marsden was across the river, when passing through the area on his way from Thames to Tauranga in 1820.

=== European settlement ===
Europeans began settling the area for gold-mining in the middle of the 19th century. They reached Paeroa by boat, and followed the river on foot. The hilly country made it difficult for horses to haul heavy machinery to the mines.

The new town was named after local administrator James Mackay, who was involved in establishing the township during his time as Thames Goldfield Warden in 1867 and 1868. The nearby Turner's Hill was named after early settler James Turner, who built a thatched cottage on the hill.

The town became an important stop for travellers. A post office opened in 1875 and a school opened in 1876.

The area was surveyed between 1877 and 1887, allowing roads to be built further into the gorge. The Mackaytown school house burned some time after 1885, and a new school was established in the main Karangahake Gorge settlement in 1889.

=== Modern history ===
In 1898, the Mackaytown Hotel was replaced with a newer, larger hotel. It had eight bedrooms, three sitting rooms, a commercial room, a dining room for sixty guests, and a stable for 15 horses.

By 1900, 50 people were living in Mackaytown and property prices were rising. The township had a suburban atmosphere, and a calcium tungstate mine.

The town continued to accommodate passing travellers well into the 20th century.

Photographs of the settlement, held by the National Library of New Zealand, shows little change to the size of the settlement between 1914 and 1958.
