= Turua =

Coordinates: 37°14′S 175°34′E

- Interactive map of Turua
- Coordinates
- Country: New Zealand
- Region: Waikato region
- District: Hauraki District
- Ward: Plains Ward
- Electorates: Coromandel; Hauraki-Waikato (Māori)

Government
  - Territorial Authority: Hauraki District Council
  - Regional council: Waikato Regional Council
  - Mayor of Thames-Coromandel: Peter Revell
  - Coromandel MP: Scott Simpson
  - Hauraki-Waikato MP: Hana-Rawhiti Maipi-Clarke

Area
  - Total: 0.96 km^{2} (0.37 sq mi)

Population (June 2025)
  - Total: 400
  - Density: 420/km^{2} (1,100/sq mi)

Turua is a small village community on the banks of the Waihou River in the Hauraki Plains in the North Island of New Zealand. It is located close to the mouth of the river, 9 kilometres south of the Firth of Thames and 12 km south of Thames. It is connected by road (Hauraki Road) to SH 25 in the north and SH 2 to the south.

Turua is a Māori place name meaning "twice seen," referring to reflections in the river. Before European settlement, the town site was a Māori pā surrounded by vast forests of kahikatea that came to be known as the "Turua Woods." In the late 19th century the village of Turua became one of the most important sites of kahikatea exploitation in New Zealand when the family of George and Martha Bagnall bought the Turua sawmill in 1875. Over the next forty years the stands of kahikatea surrounding the town were replaced by small family farms.

== Demographics ==
Turua is described by Statistics New Zealand as a rural settlement. It covers 0.96 km^{2} (0.37 sq mi) and had an estimated population of 400 as of June 2025, with a population density of 417 people per km^{2}. It is part of the larger Hauraki Plains East statistical area.

Historical population for Turua
Year	Pop.	±% p.a.
2006	381	—
2013	378	−0.11%
2018	384	+0.32%
2023	402	+0.92%

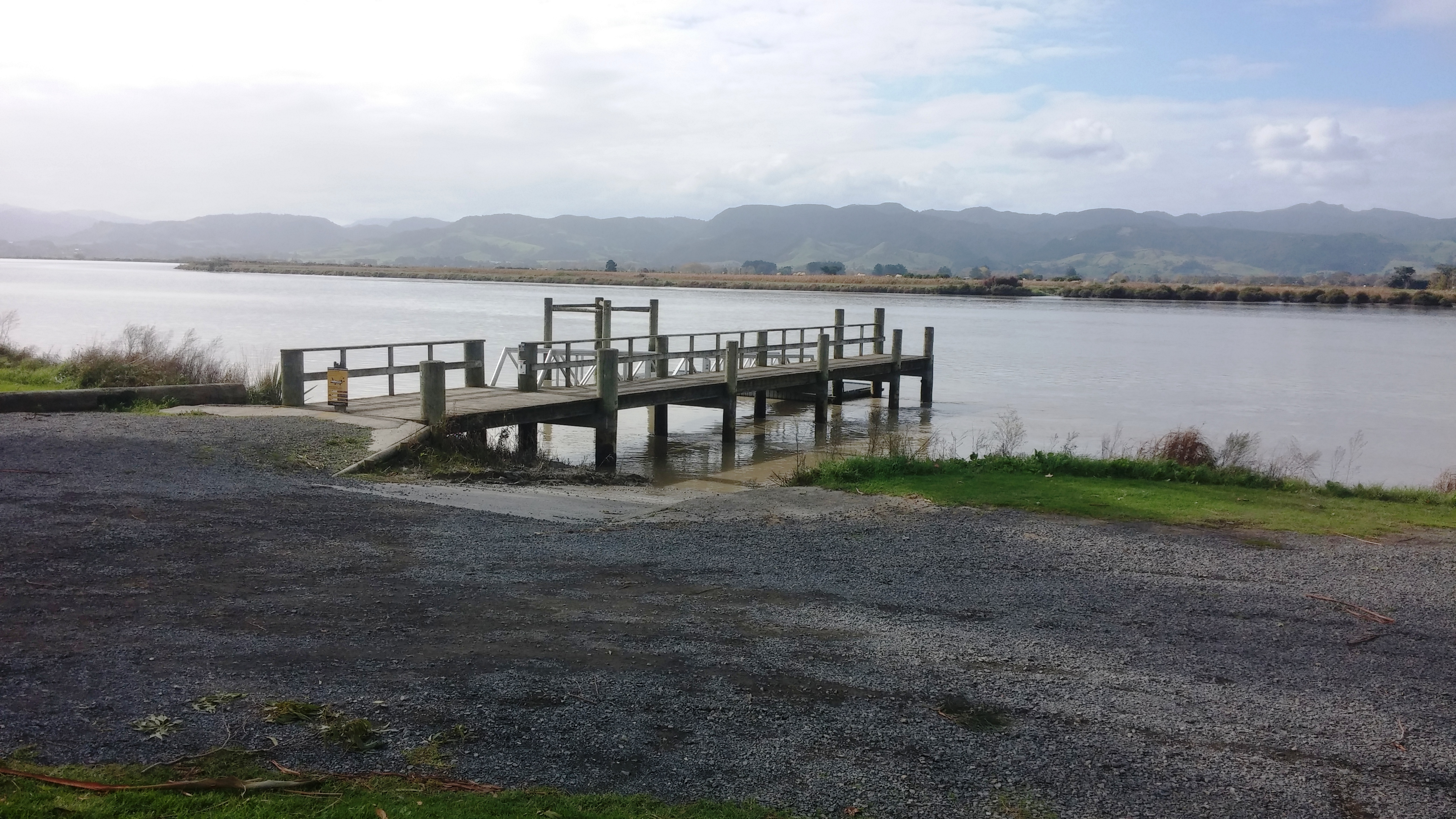
Turua Wharf, looking downstream

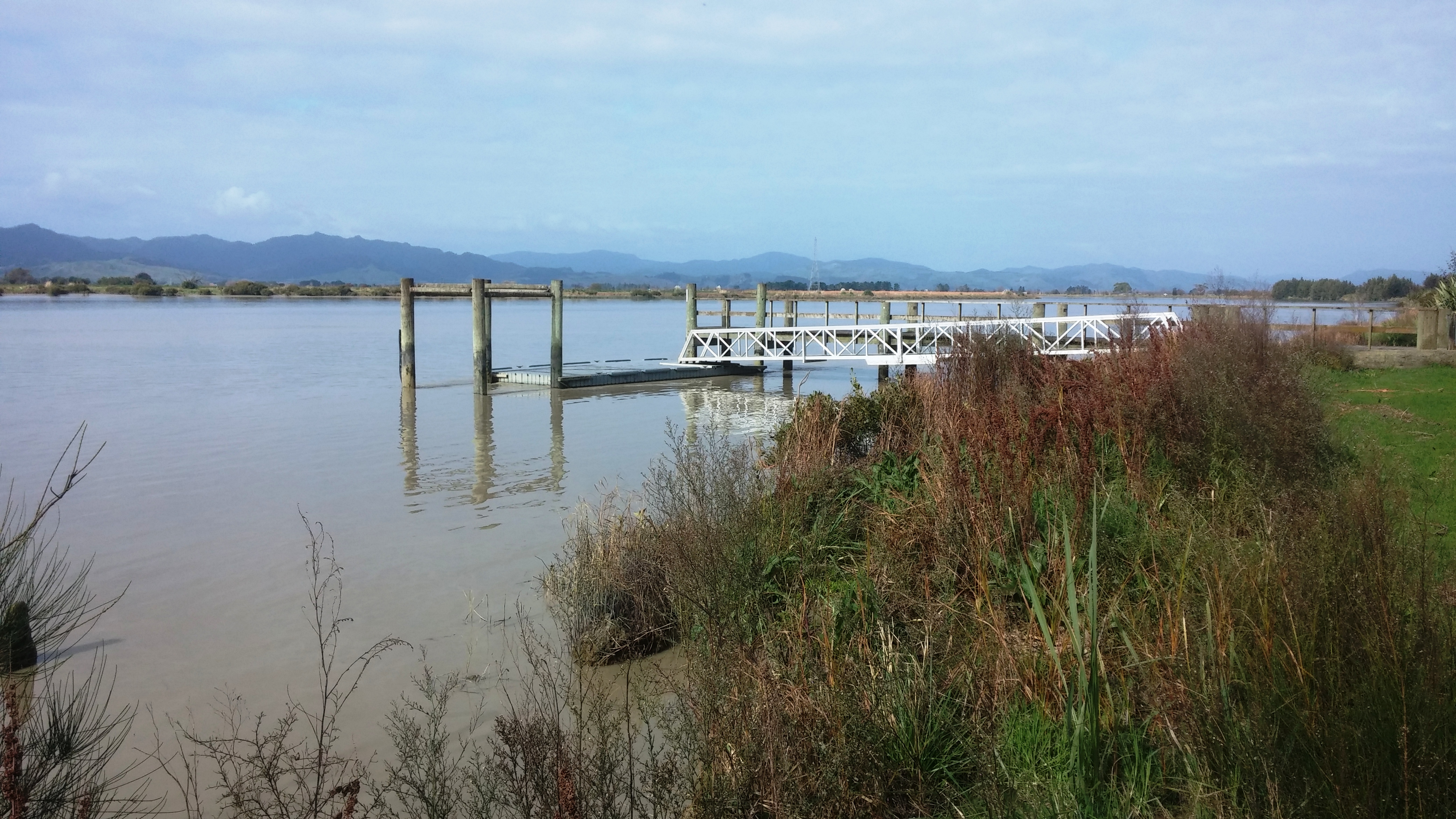
Turua Wharf, looking upstream

Turua had a population of 402 in the 2023 New Zealand census, an increase of 18 people (4.7%) since the 2018 census, and an increase of 24 people (6.3%) since the 2013 census. There were 201 males, 198 females and 3 people of other genders in 153 dwellings. 3.0% of people identified as LGBTIQ+. The median age was 43.2 years (compared with 38.1 years nationally). There were 78 people (19.4%) aged under 15 years, 57 (14.2%) aged 15 to 29, 189 (47.0%) aged 30 to 64, and 78 (19.4%) aged 65 or older.

People could identify as more than one ethnicity. The results were 83.6% European (Pākehā); 26.1% Māori; 4.5% Pasifika; 4.5% Asian; and 0.7% Middle Eastern, Latin American and African New Zealanders (MELAA). English was spoken by 98.5%, Māori language by 5.2%, Samoan by 0.7%, and other languages by 2.2%. No language could be spoken by 1.5% (e.g. too young to talk). The percentage of people born overseas was 10.4, compared with 28.8% nationally.

Religious affiliations were 21.6% Christian, 2.2% Māori religious beliefs, 0.7% Buddhist, 0.7% New Age, and 1.5% other religions. People who answered that they had no religion were 66.4%, and 6.7% of people did not answer the census question.

Of those at least 15 years old, 36 (11.1%) people had a bachelor's or higher degree, 198 (61.1%) had a post-high school certificate or diploma, and 90 (27.8%) people exclusively held high school qualifications. The median income was $37,600, compared with $41,500 nationally. 24 people (7.4%) earned over $100,000 compared to 12.1% nationally. The employment status of those at least 15 was that 168 (51.9%) people were employed full-time, 39 (12.0%) were part-time, and 6 (1.9%) were unemployed.

=== Hauraki Plains East ===
Hauraki Plains East statistical area covers 90.65 km^{2} (35.00 sq mi) and had an estimated population of 1,510 as of June 2025, with a population density of 16.7 people per km^{2}.

Historical population for Hauraki Plains East
Year	Pop.	±% p.a.
2006	1,338	—
2013	1,317	−0.23%
2018	1,365	+0.72%
2023	1,440	+1.08%

Hauraki Plains East had a population of 1,440 in the 2023 New Zealand census, an increase of 75 people (5.5%) since the 2018 census, and an increase of 123 people (9.3%) since the 2013 census. There were 735 males, 696 females and 6 people of other genders in 510 dwellings. 2.1% of people identified as LGBTIQ+. The median age was 41.0 years (compared with 38.1 years nationally). There were 300 people (20.8%) aged under 15 years, 210 (14.6%) aged 15 to 29, 693 (48.1%) aged 30 to 64, and 237 (16.5%) aged 65 or older.

People could identify as more than one ethnicity. The results were 87.5% European (Pākehā); 19.8% Māori; 2.9% Pasifika; 4.4% Asian; 0.6% Middle Eastern, Latin American and African New Zealanders (MELAA); and 3.8% other, which includes people giving their ethnicity as "New Zealander". English was spoken by 98.1%, Māori language by 2.9%, Samoan by 0.2%, and other languages by 3.5%. No language could be spoken by 1.7% (e.g. too young to talk). The percentage of people born overseas was 11.5, compared with 28.8% nationally.

Religious affiliations were 22.1% Christian, 0.2% Hindu, 0.6% Māori religious beliefs, 0.4% Buddhist, 0.2% New Age, 0.2% Jewish, and 0.8% other religions. People who answered that they had no religion were 66.7%, and 9.0% of people did not answer the census question.

Of those at least 15 years old, 147 (12.9%) people had a bachelor's or higher degree, 651 (57.1%) had a post-high school certificate or diploma, and 342 (30.0%) people exclusively held high school qualifications. The median income was $40,300, compared with $41,500 nationally. 87 people (7.6%) earned over $100,000 compared to 12.1% nationally. The employment status of those at least 15 was that 609 (53.4%) people were employed full-time, 168 (14.7%) were part-time, and 24 (2.1%) were unemployed.

== Education ==
Turua Primary School is a co-educational state primary school, with a roll of 109 as of July 2025.
