= Len Salt =

New Zealand politician

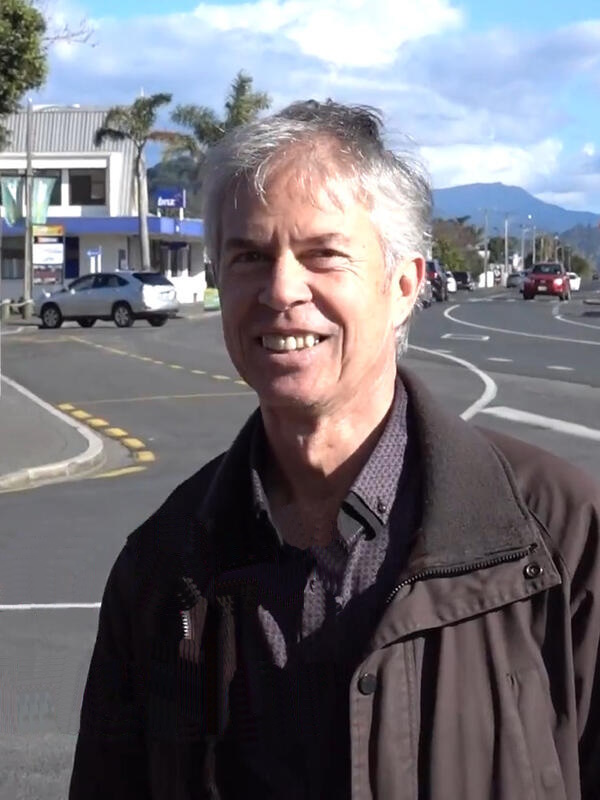
- Salt in 2016
- Born: Leonard Thomas Arthur Salt; 1956 (age 69–70); Auckland, New Zealand
- Occupations: Politician and businessman
- Spouse: Svargo

Mayor of Thames-Coromandel District Council
- Incumbent
- Assumed office 2022
- Deputy: Terry Walker
- Preceded by: Sandra Goudie

Personal details
- Party: Independent

Leonard Thomas Arthur Salt (born c. 1956) is a New Zealand local politician of Māori descent. He was elected Mayor of Thames-Coromandel District Council in 2022.

== Early life ==
Salt grew up in Auckland, New Zealand, the eldest of five children. He is of Ngāpuhi and Tainui descent.

In 2010, Salt and his wife Svargo moved to the coastal town of Whitianga, moving to Thames after he was elected in January 2023.

== Political career ==
Salt first ran unsuccessfully for Mayor of Thames-Coromandel in the 2019 New Zealand local elections.

Salt was elected Mayor of Thames-Coromandel District Council in the 2022 New Zealand local elections with 5285 votes. When he took his oath of office, he wore a new kākahu, a Māori cloak made specifically for the Mercury Bay community.

In October 2023, the TCDC voted unanimously to support the establishment of a Māori ward or wards, with Salt describing the move to improve Māori representation in council as "just a beginning".

In July 2023 Salt replied to an email from a constituent by signing off with, “Go fuck yourself, kind regards, Len”. The email was from a constituent associated with the sovereign citizen movement and was requesting the names and addresses of TCDC staff. The email was leaked by a political opponent in January 2024, and received wide media coverage. Salt was criticised by some political opponents, but also received praise on social media for taking a strong stance against harassment of public servants. Salt said he had "no regrets", and that he had received an overwhelmingly positive response from the public in support of his blunt reply.
