= Maratoto =

Locality in Hauraki District, Waikato Region, New Zealand

Coordinates: 37.2934653°S 175.7086774°E

Maratoto is a valley and rural community in the Hauraki District and Waikato region of New Zealand's North Island, north of Paeroa.

The valley extends up to the Coromandel Forest Park, which has a network of walking tracks.

== History ==
=== Early history ===
Maratoto is a Māori word meaning "the rock of blood". It refers to a Māori legend about a group of warriors who were cornered on a rocky pinnacle in the valley, and flung themselves over the bank to avoid being captured.

By the 19th century, Ngāti Tamaterā had established a pā on the banks of the Maratoto Stream. It was called Hikutaia, which translates as "the end of the tide".

European settlers arrived in the area in the mid-19th century, most of the from Ireland. A small settlement sprung up around the Pioneer Hotel, which provided accommodation and alcohol for gold-miners passing through by stage coach. Gum-diggers cleared much of the local kauri forest, and a local butcher set up a shop inside the hollow interior of an enormous kauri stump.

A telegraph line was completed 1872, ending the need for messages to be couriered to other settlements.

An Englishman pig-hunter discovered gold in the area while wrestling a pig into the creek. Richard McBrinn made a further gold discovery in the area in 1987; the McBrinn Creek is named after him.

Many people came to the area to mine gold and silver, including unusual characters like the South American Black Doctor.

A New South Wales gold-mining syndicate operated a mining company in the valley between 1888 and 1891. Their find was credible, but it was processed at a loss due to the cost of developing the site.

An Auckland syndicated established a company in the valley in 1898, installing a 15 head stamp battery and cyanide plant. It received Government funding and crushed ore for neighbouring mines.

=== Modern history ===
The mine closed in 1927 and is now abandoned.

Rock-climbers began visiting the area in the 1970s, and climbing routes began to be permanently mapped in 1996.

Remnants of old mines, an old telephone line, and a fence from an old cattle holding pen can still be found in the valley.

== Facilities and attractions ==
Three tracks are accessible via Coromandel Forest Park:

- Maratoto Wires Track follows the old telephone track through the valley, and takes about three hours one way. Part of the track is used by four wheel drivers, with restrictions in place to stop the spread of Kauri dieback. The track includes slippery clay, a steep incline, and an exposed summit at the top of the ridge.
- Golden Cross Track connects with the Wires Track and goes through a regenerating forest in an old mining and farming area.
- The Maratoto to Wentworth Crossing is a five-hour walk for experienced trampers, connecting to the Wentworth Falls Walk, Wentworth Valley and Whangamatā on the eastern side of the park.

There are 11 climbing routes. The routes are mostly suited to sport climbing, with lots of exposure and views.
