= Waimata, Hauraki District =

Coordinates: 37.429°S 175.871°E

Waimata is a rural community in the Hauraki District and Waikato region of New Zealand's North Island.

The population of Waimata and its surrounds was 138 people in 54 households in the 2013 New Zealand census.

== Education ==
Waimata School is a co-educational state primary school, with a roll of 48 as of March 2026.
