= Piako River =

Coordinates: 37°12′S 175°30′E

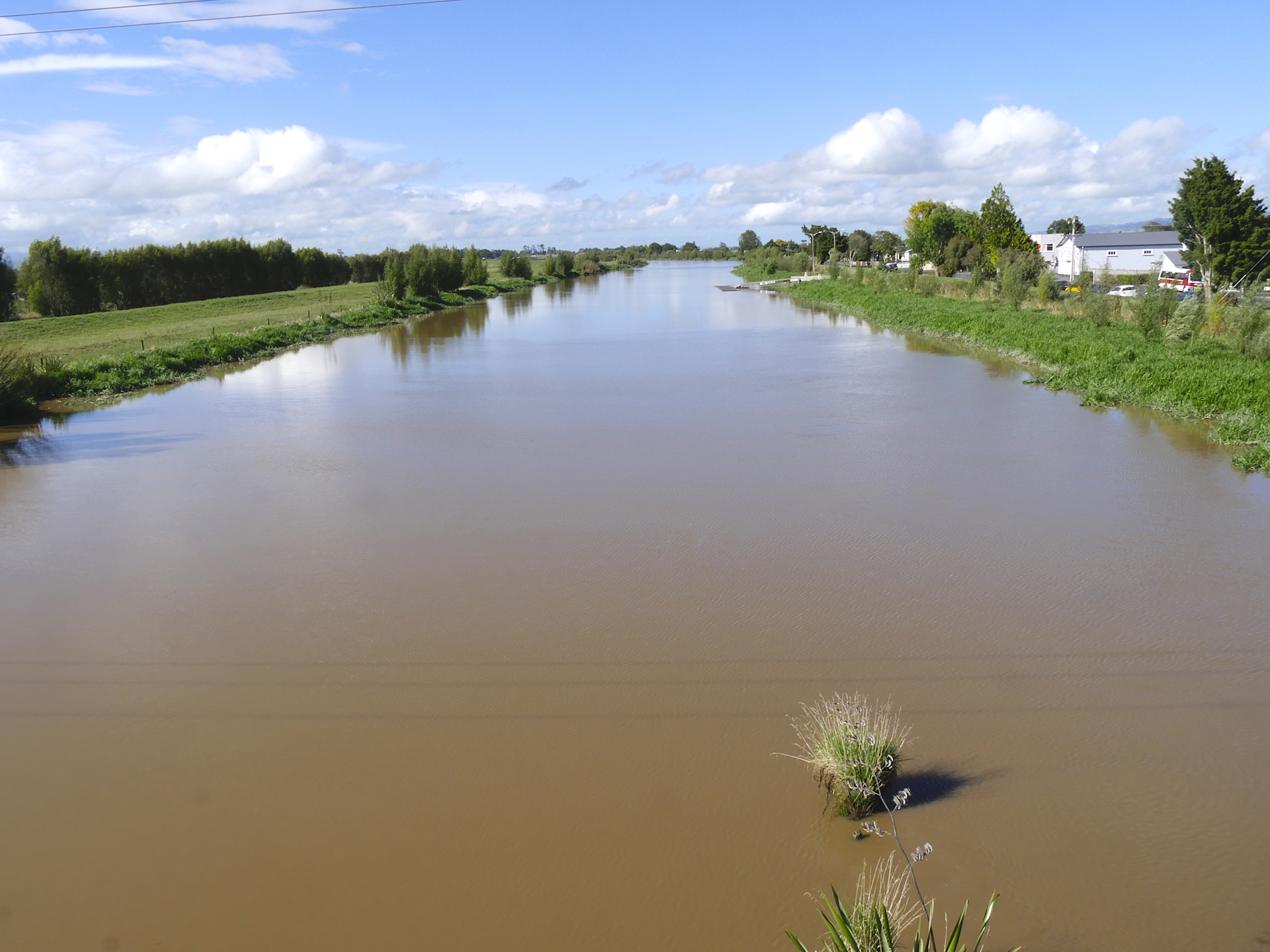

Location
- Country: New Zealand

Physical characteristics
- Source
  - location: Te Miro-Tahuroa Hills and Piarere
  - elevation: 350 m (1,150 ft)
- Mouth
  - location: Firth of Thames
  - elevation: 0 m (0 ft)
- Length: 100 km (62 mi)
- Basin size: 1,400 km^{2} (540 sq mi)

The Piako River is a lowland river system that drains into the Firth of Thames on the North Island of New Zealand. Together with the Waihou River, it is one of the two main rivers systems which drains the Hauraki Plains. It is the dominant river system in the Matamata-Piako District, and on its journey it passes through the towns of Morrinsville and Ngatea.

== Geography ==
The Piako River has an annual mean flow of 17 cubic metres per second (600 cu ft/s) (at Paeroa-Tahuna Road), with a total catchment area of approximately 1,440 square kilometres (560 mi^{2}). The river system is approximately 100 kilometres (62 mi) long, aligned in a north–south direction and occupies much of the central and western Hauraki Plains (or more broadly, the Thames Valley), extending from Hinuera in the south before discharging into the Firth of Thames in the north, five kilometres west of Thames.

The Piako River has two major stems: the first, and main, stem drains the northern Te Miro-Tahuroa hills, and the Pakaroa Range. The dominant tributaries on the eastern slopes of these hills are the Piakonui and Piakoiti Streams. These streams, together with the smaller Toenepi Stream, converge just south of Kereone to become the Piako River. The western slopes are drained by the Waitakaruru Stream which joins the Piako River at Morrinsville. As the Piako River progresses north, it is fed by numerous small streams draining the eastern slopes of the Hangawera Hills.

The second stem is the Waitoa River, which starts near Piarere. The Waitoa River catchment drains the Hinuera Flats and broad southern Hauraki Plains, before converging with the Piako River in the large wetland known as the Kopuatai Peat Dome, northeast of Tahuna. The Upper Piako River catchment also drains the eastern aspects of the Hapuakohe Range through small tributaries.

The river system is highly modified by intensive dairy farming and associated industry. Given this, the Toenepi Stream - a small sub-catchment of the Piako River - has been extensively used to research the impact of intensive farming on water quality and develop improved farming practices.

== Drainage and flood protection ==
In 1906 work started on cutting the bends in the river below Kaihere Landing. Since the 1930s, considerable flood protection measures have been undertaken on the Piako River and surrounding catchment, especially mainly north of Paeroa-Tahuna Road and the Kopuatai Peat Dome. The scheme includes river management works, river diversions and channel enlargement, ponding systems, floodway improvements, stopbanks, floodgates and pumps. However, the river flooded again in 2017. A 2018 plan provides for strengthened stopbanks and diversion ponds.

The scheme works includes the following:

- Main river and tributary channel enlargement and clearing work,
- 170 km of stopbanks,
- 59 floodgates and
- 32 pump stations

The scheme provides the following levels of service:

- 100-year protection from tidal flooding with 0.5-metre (1.6 ft) freeboard,
- 50-year protection from Piako River flooding with 0.3-metre (1 ft) freeboard

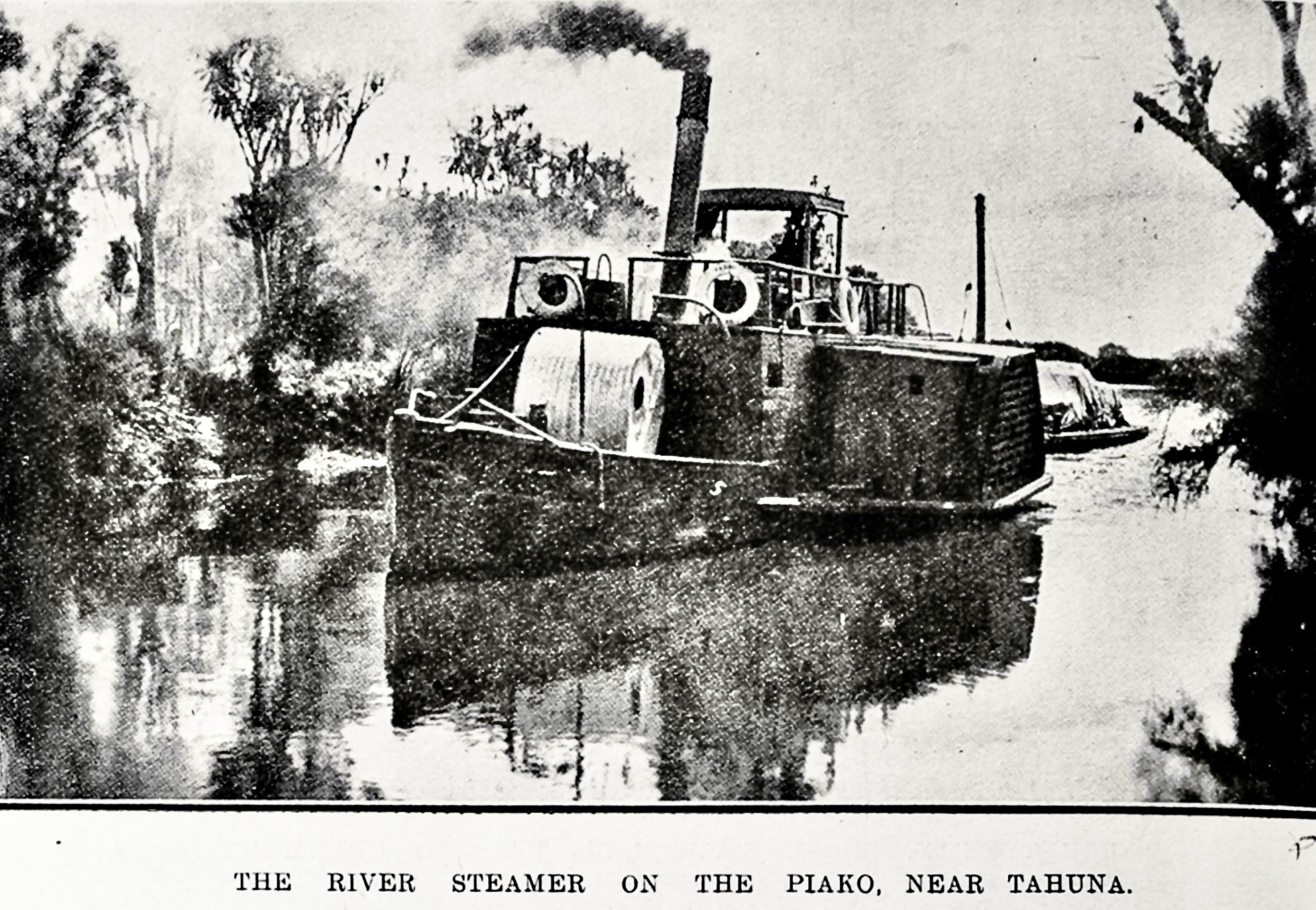
PS Kopu near Tahuna in 1922

== Transport ==
Until 1930 the river was used to Tahuna and occasionally Morrinsville to carry people and goods. Northern Steamship had a weekly trip from Auckland to Tahuna and back until 1927, calling at Pipiroa, Hopai, Ngatea (Orchard), Kerepehi and Waikaka. A few years earlier plans had been made to upgrade the main highways in the area, partly with ratepayer funding. A vehicle ferry crossed the river at Kaihere from 1927, until replaced by a bridge in 1956 and at Pipiroa from 1926 until replaced by a bridge in 1954.

== Piako River Bridge (Ngatea) ==
The original Piako River Bridge was built in Ngatea and opened in 1917. In the earliest days all transport or access to and from the land was either by sea, river or canal, but with the first roads being developed, it was essential that a bridge be built over the Piako River so it could become a main route between Auckland and Tauranga. Considerable work has gone into restoring the banks of the river, as in winter it is the direct cause of flooding through the low-lying Hauraki Plains. From 1917 to 1952 the bridge had a lifting section to allow ships to pass.

== History ==
Captain James Cook sailed up the Piako.
