= Waitakaruru =

- Locality
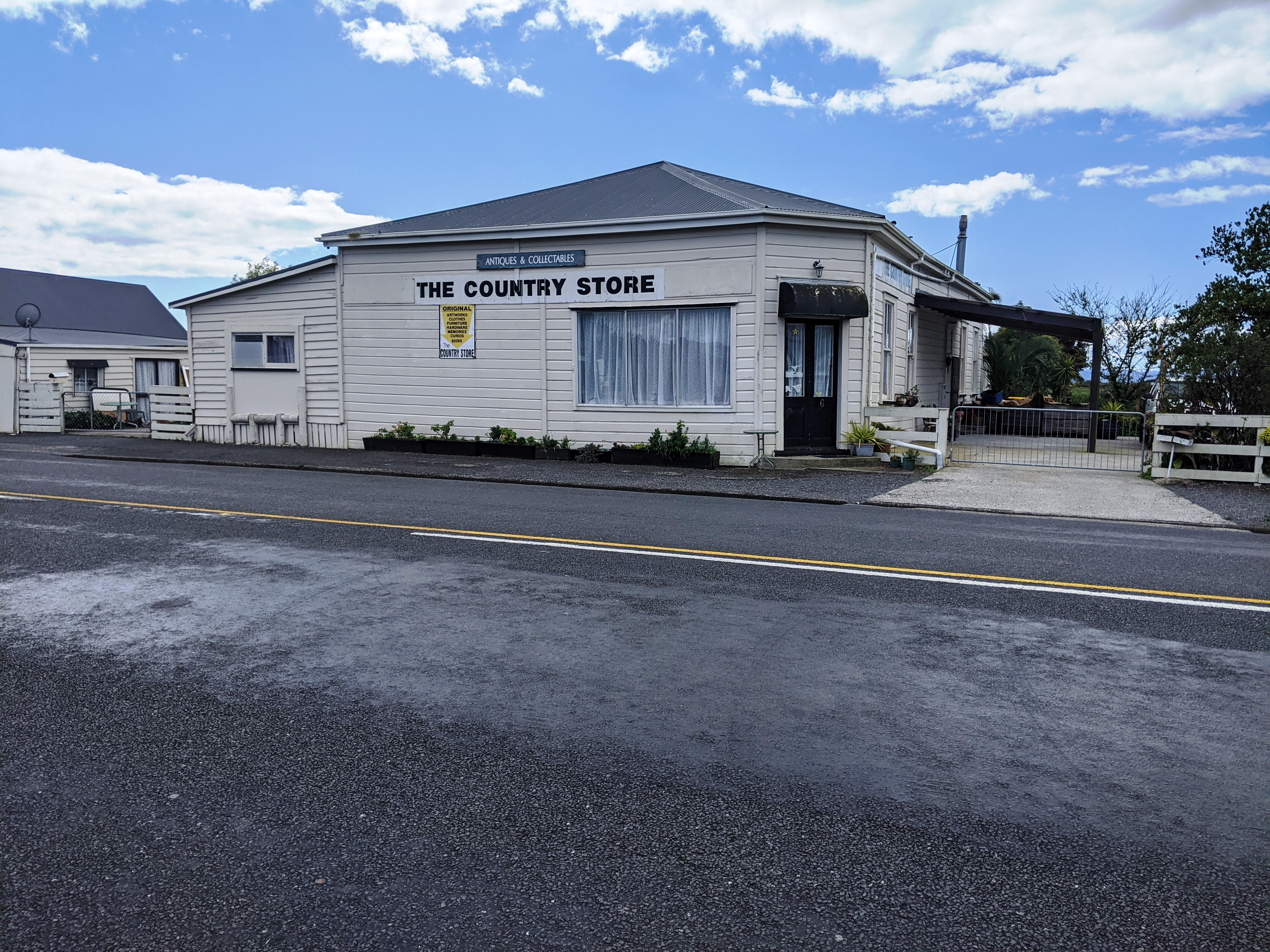
- The Country Store
- Interactive map of Waitakaruru
- Coordinates: 37°14′S 175°23′E
- Country: New Zealand
- Region: Waikato region
- District: Hauraki District
- Ward: Plains Ward
- Electorates: Coromandel; Hauraki-Waikato (Māori)

Government
  - Territorial Authority: Hauraki District Council
  - Regional council: Waikato Regional Council
  - Mayor of Thames-Coromandel: Peter Revell
  - Coromandel MP: Scott Simpson
  - Hauraki-Waikato MP: Hana-Rawhiti Maipi-Clarke

Area
  - Total: 39.35 km^{2} (15.19 sq mi)

Population (2023 Census)
  - Total: 381
  - Density: 9.68/km^{2} (25.1/sq mi)
- Time zone: UTC+12 (NZST)
  - Summer (DST): UTC+13 (NZDT)

Waitakaruru is a rural community in the Hauraki District and Waikato region of New Zealand's North Island. It is situated at the mouth of Waitakaruru River

== Demographics ==
Waitakaruru is in three SA1 statistical areas which cover 39.35 km^{2} (15.19 sq mi). The SA1 areas are part of the larger Hauraki Plains North statistical area.

Historical population for Waiakaruru and surrounds
Year	Pop.	±% p.a.
2013	336	—
2018	354	+1.05%
2023	381	+1.48%

The SA1 areas had a population of 381 in the 2023 New Zealand census, an increase of 27 people (7.6%) since the 2018 census, and an increase of 45 people (13.4%) since the 2013 census. There were 195 males and 183 females in 138 dwellings. 2.4% of people identified as LGBTIQ+. There were 99 people (26.0%) aged under 15 years, 75 (19.7%) aged 15 to 29, 162 (42.5%) aged 30 to 64, and 45 (11.8%) aged 65 or older.

People could identify as more than one ethnicity. The results were 83.5% European (Pākehā), 29.1% Māori, 8.7% Pasifika, 7.1% Asian, and 3.1% other, which includes people giving their ethnicity as "New Zealander". English was spoken by 95.3%, Māori language by 3.9%, and other languages by 6.3%. No language could be spoken by 3.1% (e.g. too young to talk). The percentage of people born overseas was 15.0, compared with 28.8% nationally.

Religious affiliations were 18.9% Christian, 0.8% Māori religious beliefs, and 3.9% other religions. People who answered that they had no religion were 70.1%, and 6.3% of people did not answer the census question.

Of those at least 15 years old, 45 (16.0%) people had a bachelor's or higher degree, 171 (60.6%) had a post-high school certificate or diploma, and 63 (22.3%) people exclusively held high school qualifications. 24 people (8.5%) earned over $100,000 compared to 12.1% nationally. The employment status of those at least 15 was that 150 (53.2%) people were employed full-time, 39 (13.8%) were part-time, and 6 (2.1%) were unemployed.

=== Hauraki Plains North ===
Hauraki Plains North statistical area, which also includes Pipiroa, covers 180.43 km^{2} (69.66 sq mi) and had an estimated population of 1,320 as of June 2025, with a population density of 7.3 people per km^{2}.

Historical population for Hauraki Plains North
Year	Pop.	±% p.a.
2006	1,089	—
2013	1,119	+0.39%
2018	1,167	+0.84%
2023	1,269	+1.69%
The 2006 population is for a smaller area of 178.74 km^{2}. Source:

Hauraki Plains North had a population of 1,269 in the 2023 New Zealand census, an increase of 102 people (8.7%) since the 2018 census, and an increase of 150 people (13.4%) since the 2013 census. There were 636 males, 630 females and 3 people of other genders in 474 dwellings. 1.7% of people identified as LGBTIQ+. The median age was 39.5 years (compared with 38.1 years nationally). There were 270 people (21.3%) aged under 15 years, 210 (16.5%) aged 15 to 29, 576 (45.4%) aged 30 to 64, and 213 (16.8%) aged 65 or older.

People could identify as more than one ethnicity. The results were 87.7% European (Pākehā); 20.1% Māori; 3.3% Pasifika; 5.2% Asian; 0.2% Middle Eastern, Latin American and African New Zealanders (MELAA); and 2.8% other, which includes people giving their ethnicity as "New Zealander". English was spoken by 97.2%, Māori language by 2.6%, and other languages by 5.0%. No language could be spoken by 2.4% (e.g. too young to talk). The percentage of people born overseas was 11.8, compared with 28.8% nationally.

Religious affiliations were 23.2% Christian, 0.2% Islam, 0.7% Māori religious beliefs, 0.2% Buddhist, 0.2% New Age, and 2.6% other religions. People who answered that they had no religion were 63.4%, and 9.5% of people did not answer the census question.

Of those at least 15 years old, 123 (12.3%) people had a bachelor's or higher degree, 627 (62.8%) had a post-high school certificate or diploma, and 252 (25.2%) people exclusively held high school qualifications. The median income was $43,200, compared with $41,500 nationally. 87 people (8.7%) earned over $100,000 compared to 12.1% nationally. The employment status of those at least 15 was that 513 (51.4%) people were employed full-time, 159 (15.9%) were part-time, and 27 (2.7%) were unemployed.

== Education ==
Waitakaruru School is a co-educational state primary school, with a roll of 92 as of July 2026.
