= Hauraki Plains =

Region of New Zealand

Coordinates: 37°17′S 175°30′E

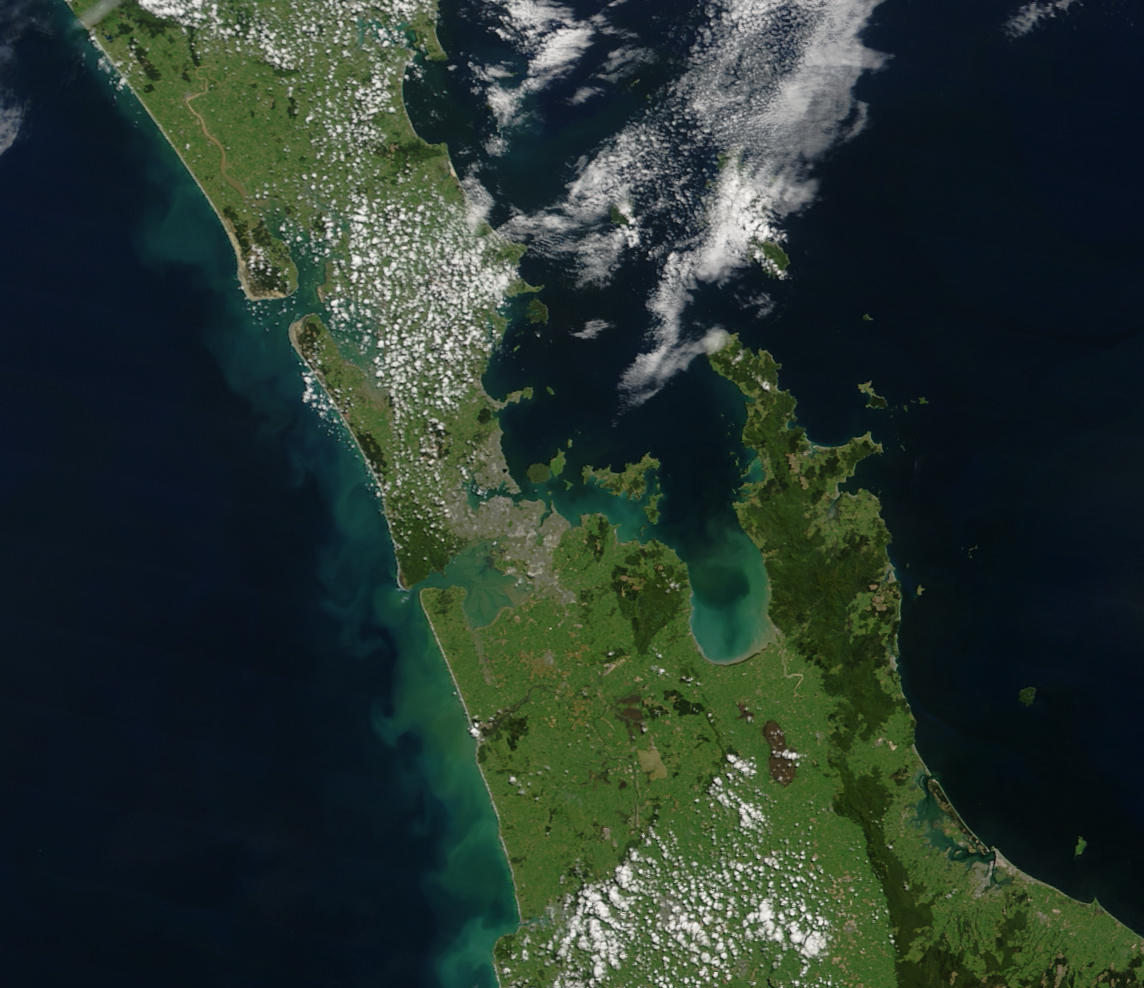
A true-colour image acquired by NASA's Terra satellite, on 23 October 2002. The Hauraki Plains are at the base of the large bay (the Firth of Thames) just to the lower right of centre. Dark green forest outlines the Kaimai Ranges to the east of the plains, and the Hunua and Coromandel ranges, west and east respectively, of the firth.

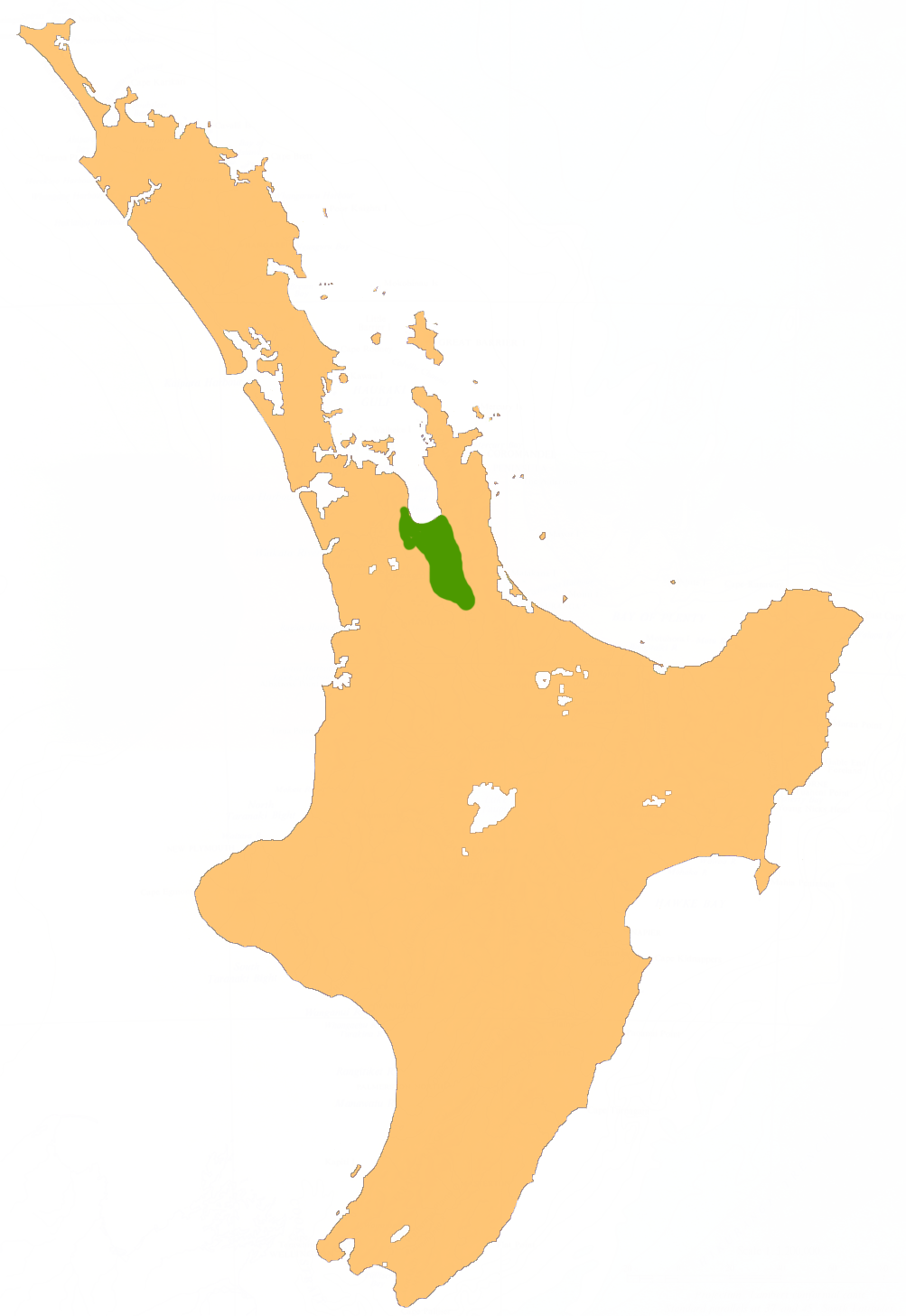
Location of the Hauraki Plains.

The Hauraki Plains are a geographical area located in the northern North Island of New Zealand, at the lower (northern) end of the Thames Valley. They are located 75 kilometres south-east of Auckland, at the foot of the Coromandel Peninsula and occupy the southern portion of a rift valley bounded on the north-west by the Hunua Ranges, to the east by the Coromandel and Kaimai ranges and to the west by a series of undulating hills which separate the plains from the much larger plains of the Waikato River.

The Plains are not presently a single administrative area, though a Hauraki Plains County Council existed from 1920 to 1989 and a statistical Area Unit remains. Broadly, the northern and southern parts of the Hauraki Plains are administered by the Hauraki District and the Matamata-Piako District respectively.

The alluvial plains have been built up by sediment deposited by the Piako and Waihou rivers, which flow north to reach the sea at the Firth of Thames, and earlier by the ancestral Waikato River. The resulting land is flat, peat-heavy, and partly swampy, which has been converted into excellent land for dairy farming.

Economically, the dairy farming is the leading primary industry, supported by other grassland farming. More recently, tourism in the Hauraki Plains region has been growing and the Hauraki Rail Trail, part of the New Zealand Cycle Trail, has been constructed in the Hauraki Plains.

The largest town fully within the Plains is Ngatea, with a smaller settlement of Turua. The larger town of Paeroa is located on the eastern edge of the Hauraki Plains. While there is no defined geographical southern boundary to the Hauraki Plains, this is generally taken as being a line between the towns of Te Aroha and Morrinsville, approximately following State Highway 26.

== Demographics ==
Three statistical areas cover the northern part of Hauraki Plains: Hauraki Plains North, Hauraki Plains East and Hauraki Plains South. They include Turua, Kaihere, Kerepehi, Pipiroa and Waitakaruru, and surround but do not include Ngatea. They cover 522.47 km^{2} (201.73 sq mi) and had an estimated population of 4,610 as of June 2024, with a population density of 8.8 people per km^{2}.

Historical population
Year	Pop.	±% p.a.
2006	3,963	—
2013	3,831	−0.48%
2018	4,065	+1.19%
2023	4,260	+0.94%
The 2006 population is for a smaller area of 520.80 km^{2}. Source:

Hauraki Plains had a population of 4,260 in the 2023 New Zealand census, an increase of 195 people (4.8%) since the 2018 census, and an increase of 429 people (11.2%) since the 2013 census. There were 2,160 males, 2,085 females and 9 people of other genders in 1,521 dwellings. 2.0% of people identified as LGBTIQ+. There were 951 people (22.3%) aged under 15 years, 675 (15.8%) aged 15 to 29, 1,971 (46.3%) aged 30 to 64, and 660 (15.5%) aged 65 or older.

People could identify as more than one ethnicity. The results were 84.0% European (Pākehā); 22.4% Māori; 3.9% Pasifika; 4.8% Asian; 0.5% Middle Eastern, Latin American and African New Zealanders (MELAA); and 3.0% other, which includes people giving their ethnicity as "New Zealander". English was spoken by 97.4%, Māori language by 3.8%, Samoan by 0.1%, and other languages by 4.8%. No language could be spoken by 2.2% (e.g. too young to talk). New Zealand Sign Language was known by 0.3%. The percentage of people born overseas was 12.3, compared with 28.8% nationally.

Religious affiliations were 22.9% Christian, 0.5% Hindu, 0.1% Islam, 1.8% Māori religious beliefs, 0.4% Buddhist, 0.2% New Age, 0.1% Jewish, and 1.6% other religions. People who answered that they had no religion were 63.6%, and 9.0% of people did not answer the census question.

Of those at least 15 years old, 390 (11.8%) people had a bachelor's or higher degree, 1,971 (59.6%) had a post-high school certificate or diploma, and 948 (28.6%) people exclusively held high school qualifications. 246 people (7.4%) earned over $100,000 compared to 12.1% nationally. The employment status of those at least 15 was that 1,767 (53.4%) people were employed full-time, 465 (14.1%) were part-time, and 81 (2.4%) were unemployed.

Individual statistical areas
Name	Area (km^{2})	Population	Density (per km^{2})	Dwellings	Median age	Median income
Hauraki Plains North	180.43	1,269	7.0	474	39.5 years	$43,200
Hauraki Plains East	90.65	1,440	15.9	510	41.0 years	$40,300
Hauraki Plains South	251.39	1,551	6.2	537	36.4 years	$41,900
New Zealand					38.1 years	$41,500

== History ==
=== Formation ===
Around 2–3 million years ago, a large block of the crust slumped down 500–2000 metres, forming in due course the Hauraki 2 to 3 half-grabens. The ancestral Waikato River often flowed through the resulting valley into the Hauraki Gulf, most recently through the Hinuera Valley some 20,000 years ago. Over time, the Hauraki Basin slowly filled up with pumice, mud and gravel.

=== Wetlands ===
After the last shift of the Waikato River back to the west coast, the Waihou and Piako rivers were formed. These two rivers carried silt out into the Firth of Thames or Tikapa.

The plains were full of mangroves, raupō (Typha orientalis), harakeke (Phormium tenax) a dense forest of kahikatea. Most of the land was raw peat, varying in depth from a metre to more than twenty metres. It was a morass, the home of wild ducks and eels. Nevertheless, the rich flora and fauna of the plains amply provided the staples of the Māori people who lived in the region. Many areas on the banks of the Waihou River were settled by Hauraki Māori, such as Oruarangi pā and Pāterangi pā near Matatoki, and the Te Raupa pā and Waiwhau pā near Paeroa.

The early European colonists were attracted not necessarily by the land, but by the dense forest of kahikatea. The colonists (or Pākehā) were timber millers such as the George and Martha Bagnall family who settled at Turua in 1875. As the kahikatea was felled, farmers followed onto the newly cleared land. But, once a year, the Waihou and Piako Rivers would overflow, making agricultural settlement of the area difficult because of the poor drainage. The people who lived around Hauraki wanted permission from the Government to drain the land, but the Government said it could never be done, as parts of the Hauraki Plains were two metres below sea level. However, in 1908 an act was passed to give the people permission to drain the land. The Government paid the workers to dig the drains, a process that took ten years to complete.

=== First land ballots ===
In 1910, the Government decided to open an area of 16,299 acres (66 km^{2}) for settlement on the Hauraki Plains. Ballots were held for the blocks, which attracted the interests of future settlers and businessmen in the Thames Valley. Miners in the South Island were keen to settle in the area if sections were drawn up by the Government. The first applications for land blocks were made at the Miner's Union Hall in Thames on 18 May 1910. Prices ranged from $10–$15 an acre, depending on how much land was being bought and the location of the block. Some of the most sought-after blocks had up to 99 applicants.

=== Drainage systems ===
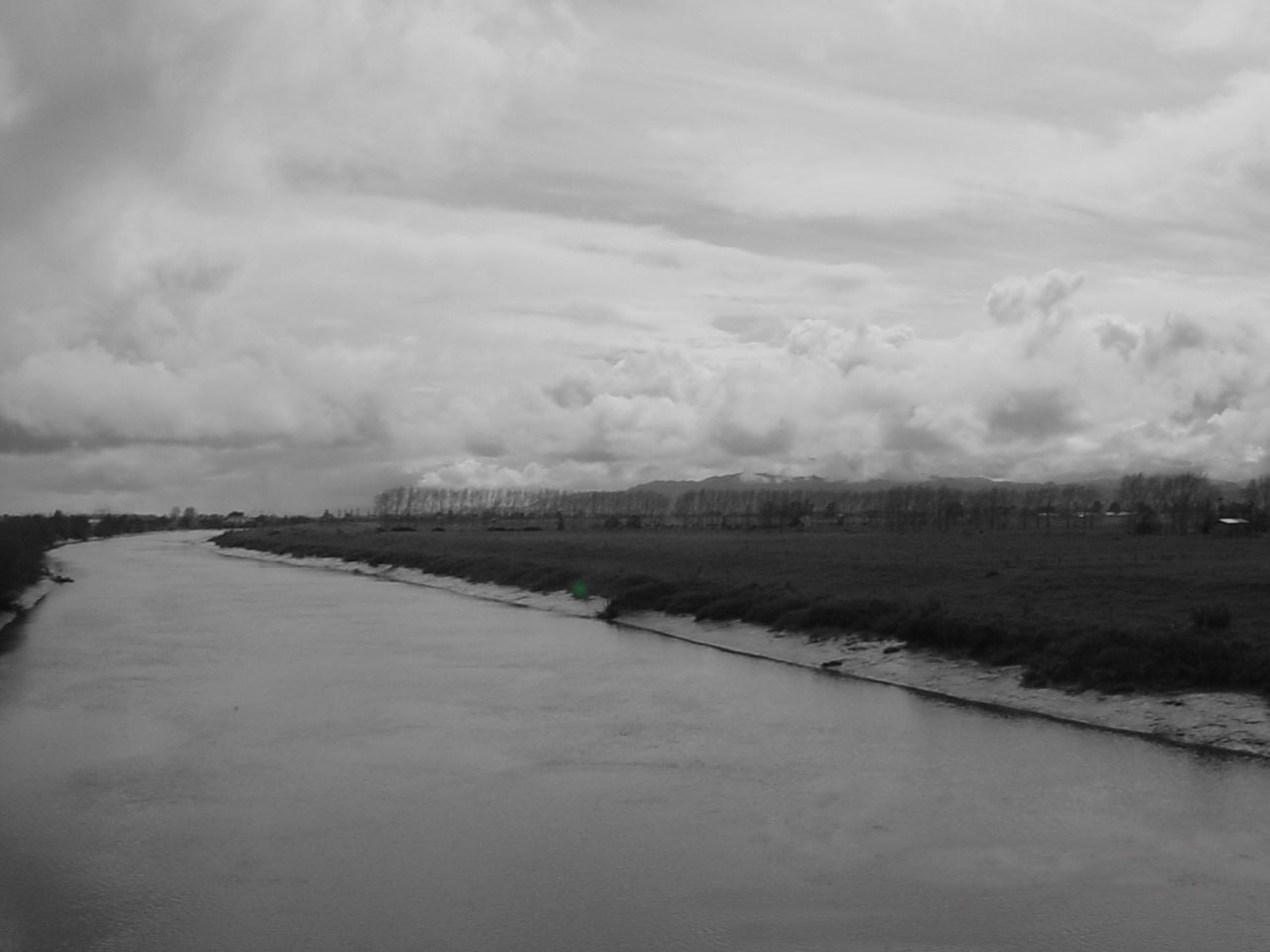
Control works in the floodplain of the Piako River played a big role in the draining of the Hauraki Plains

Work started immediately after the passing of the Hauraki Plains Act. Controlling the flooding of the Piako River which overflowed at least once a year was crucial. This was achieved through the construction of stop-banks to prevent floods and tidal overflow.

Farmers were required to dig drains, ranging from one to two metres wide, through their land. These drains connected to the main drains, which brought the water out and into the canals. Floodgates were installed to prevent the ingress of water into the canals, while allowing floodwaters to flow out of the system. As a result of the drainage system, the size of the wetlands declined to less than 25% of their original area.

Once the land was mostly drained, scrub, logs and tree stumps had to be cleared, and the earth levelled, to convert it to pasture. The scrub and waste was burnt off.

== River transport ==
River transport was the most effective method to transport goods, people and animals to the Hauraki Plains, as an effective roading system had not yet been established.

=== Ship traffic ===
Ships of all sizes plied the rivers of the Hauraki Plains, from tiny row boats to huge barques although, most of the boats were steamers and the engines were made at A & G Price in Thames.

As industries progressed (like the mining in Waihi) bigger ships were required to carry the bigger loads. The majority of the boats were steamers, but some were paddle steamers. Larger passenger ships had luxurious lounges for men and women decorated with velvet upholstery and paintings on the walls. There were even brass bands on some boats and room for dancing on the decks. There was also room for horses and general cargo. Some cargo boats and punts were designed with drop sides to assist in loading and unloading on the river banks. This was especially useful when animals were being loaded.

During the mining strike the hotels were closed by the government, but you could still drink on a moving boat. So people would get on the boats and take a trip for the day just to use the bar.

In 1877, massive timber ships called barques travelled up to Bagnalls' mill in Turua to collect the kahikatea logs and transport them to Auckland and Australia. You can still see the remains of the wharf where the ships berthed. When the Bagnalls first arrived in Turua and wanted to go to church in Thames, they rowed to Kopu then walked the last five miles (8.0 km) to Thames.

At Orchard (now called Ngatea), Pipiroa, Kopu and Paeroa there were punts (floating platforms) that carried people, horses and carts across the rivers for a small fee. At Te Aroha, there was a wire rope stretched across the river which originally had a Māori canoe tied to it on which people could pull themselves across and was later replaced by a punt with a crank and for two shillings people could crank themselves across.

=== River systems ===
Geologists have shown that a very long time ago, the Waikato river came through the Hinuera valley and filled the Hauraki Basin with pumice, mud, drift wood and gravel to a depth of over 1200 ft. You can still see evidence of sea beaches between Shelly Beach and Maukoro.

Before the arrival of the European settlers, the Hauraki Plains was 400 km^{2} of peat and swamp land which acted as a big ponding area, through which ran two main rivers – the Waihou and Piako.

Māori used the rivers for hundreds of years to get to the rich food resources in the swamp. When the Europeans came they also used the rivers for transport. Because the Hauraki Plains were swamp land and there were no roads the easiest way to transport people, supplies, food and produce was by boat.

Gold brought many ships up the Waihou and Ohinemuri rivers with heavy machinery and miners aboard. There was even a special hard wharf built at Paeroa for fear of a conventional one collapsing while the machines were unloaded.

Bagnells' mill at Turua was established to mill the tall kahikatea trees growing there. Huge barques (sailing ships) came up the river on flood tides to collect the wood, some of which would be taken to Australia and be made into butter boxes.

After the scrub and kahikatea had been cleared farming was taken up and the farmers needed everything from food to animals and boats and the rivers carried it all in.

In pioneer days the rivers were the lifelines of the Hauraki Plains, but as roads improved and bridges were built the need for river transport diminished. Today it has all died away except the ferry that goes up the Waihou to Paeroa from Auckland, and the metal barge that comes into Kopu to pick up a load.

==== Waihou River ====
In 1769 Captain James Cook travelled up the Waihou River to look at the "lofty trees which adorn its banks". He was the first European to travel up the river. The Waihou reminded him of the River Thames in London so he named it the River Thames. Although this name stuck for quite some time, now it is known as the Waihou. His discovery of the kahikatea tree later brought many ships to the area looking for masts and spars.

In the 1900s the Waihou was navigable right up to Matamata, because development had not yet silted up the river. Travelling up stream you would pass Kopu on the left then Turua on the right, Matatoki, Puriri, Hikutaia, Paeroa and Te Aroha on the left and eventually Matamata on the right.

==== Piako River ====
The Piako River is much smaller than the Waihou, but it was just as important in the development of the Hauraki Plains. Travelling up the Piako you would see Pipiroa, then Ngatea, both on the right, followed by Kerepehi, and the last town accessible by boat was Patetonga.

Supplies were brought up the Piako by a small yacht and later by a launch. The boat was the main outlet to civilisation for the settlers who were mostly male bachelors and it was easier for them to eat stale bread brought up by the boat weekly than to make it themselves. It also brought mail and took cream back to Kopu which took four hours.

The rivers were a major lifeline for the plains in the early days and they are still a part of everyday life, though not nearly as much as they used to be.

== Industries ==
=== Dairy farming ===
Dairy farming is the most important industry on the Hauraki Plains, providing the most income for the region. The sizes of dairy farms range from around 100 cows to over 500. 66% of the total land area of the plains is used in dairy farming. This equates to 779.34 km^{2} of land.

=== Other farming ===
Although dairy farming is the main industry it is not the only farming industry. Sheep and dry stock farming are beginning to catch on with farmers. There is still the demand for wool and meat, which the Hauraki Plains region helps to provide. An ostrich farm has been developed near Turua which deals in tourism, meat sales and gifts.

== Education ==
There are primary schools in Ngatea, Kaihere, Pipiroa, Waitakaruru and Turua.

Secondary education options include Hauraki Plains College in Ngatea, Paeroa College, and Thames High School.

== Wetlands conservation ==
In the 1840s an estimated 1100 km^{2} of wetland covered the lower Waikato area and Hauraki Plains. Since then 85 to 90% of New Zealand wetlands have been lost. The Department of Conservation (DOC) estimates of wetlands that remain in the Waikato are around 320 km^{2}, approximately 25% of their original area. This figure includes Whangamarino (5,130.35 hectares), and Kopuatai Peat Dome (9,238.44 hectares). Roughly 80% of New Zealand's remaining wetlands are in areas across the Waikato region, mostly within the Waikato, Matamata-Piako and Hauraki Districts. Five of New Zealand's wetlands are listed on the International Convention on Wetlands of International Importance (Ramsar sites); there are three of them in the Waikato Region:

- Kopuatai Peat Dome
- Whangamarino Wetland
- Firth of Thames estuary

=== Kopuatai Peat Dome ===
At 9,238.44 hectares, the Kopuatai Peat Dome is New Zealand's largest unaltered restiad peat bog, and is also globally unique. The area is protected by the Wetland Management Reserve under the Conservation Act 1987 and is managed by the Department of Conservation.

Fifty four species of birds have been recorded in the Kopuatai Peat Dome. Twenty seven are protected, 17 are unprotected and 10 are game birds. The endangered Australasian bittern (Botaurus poiciloptilus) is found in the wetland with other endangered birds such as the banded rail (Rallus philipensis assimillis), marsh crake (Porzana pusilla affinis) and the North Island fernbird (Bowdleria punctata vealeae).
