= Waihi =

- Town
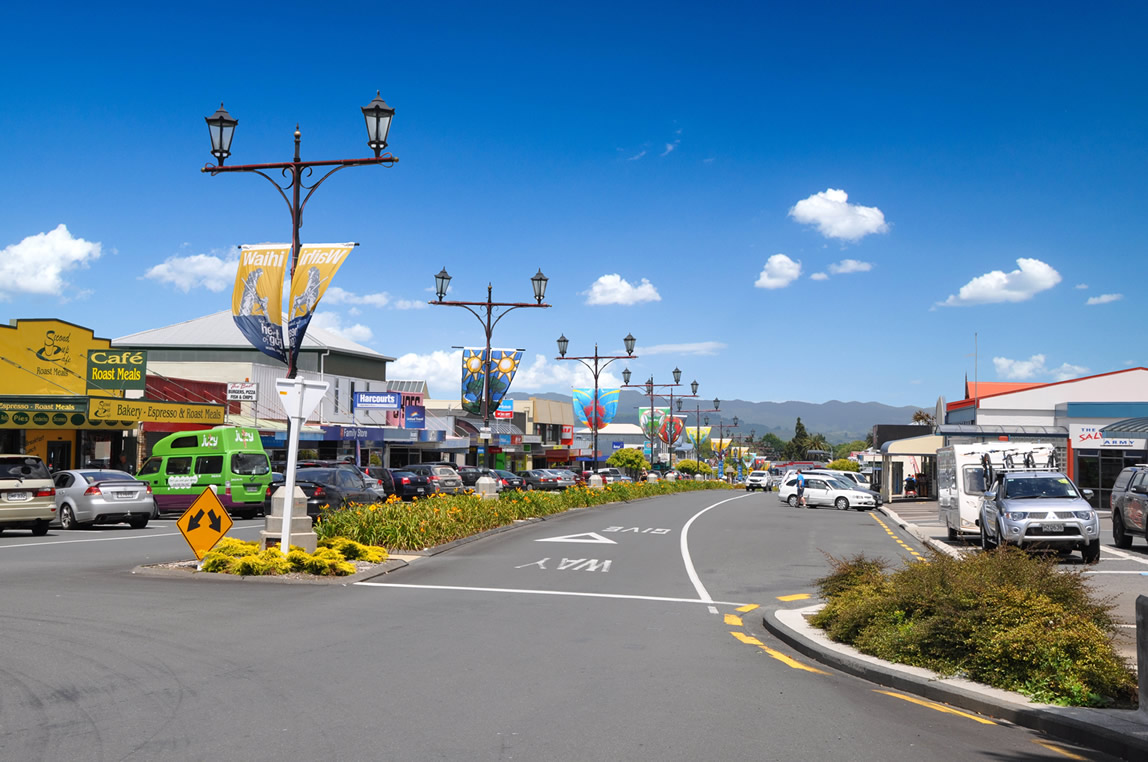
- Waihi's Main Street (Seddon Street) looking South
- Interactive map of Waihi
- Coordinates: 37°23′S 175°50′E
- Country: New Zealand
- Region: Waikato region
- Territorial authority: Hauraki District
- Ward: Waihi Ward
- Electorates: Coromandel; Hauraki-Waikato (Māori)

Government
  - Territorial Authority: Hauraki District Council
  - Regional council: Waikato Regional Council
  - Mayor of Thames-Coromandel: Peter Revell
  - Coromandel MP: Scott Simpson
  - Hauraki-Waikato MP: Hana-Rawhiti Maipi-Clarke

Area
  - Total: 9.55 km^{2} (3.69 sq mi)

Population (June 2025)
  - Total: 5,850
  - Density: 613/km^{2} (1,590/sq mi)
- Time zone: UTC+12 (NZST)
  - Summer (DST): UTC+13 (NZDT)
- Postcode(s): 3610

Waihi is a town in Hauraki District in the North Island of New Zealand, especially notable for its history as a gold mine town.

The town is at the foot of the Coromandel Peninsula, close to the western end of the Bay of Plenty. The nearby resort town of Waihi Beach, ten kilometres to the east, is often regarded as the westernmost point of the Bay of Plenty region. To the west are the hills of the Kaimai Ranges. Road access from this direction is through the winding Karangahake Gorge road. Waihi has a warm and temperate climate but unusually high rainfall for New Zealand's east coast with an average annual rainfall of 2147 mm.

== Demographics ==
Stats NZ describes Waihī as a small urban area. It covers 9.55 km^{2} (3.69 sq mi) and had an estimated population of 5,850 as of June 2025, with a population density of 613 people per km^{2}.

Historical population for Waihī town
Year	Pop.	±% p.a.
2006	4,620	—
2013	4,671	+0.16%
2018	5,409	+2.98%
2023	5,682	+0.99%
The 2006 population is for a smaller area of 9.40 km^{2}. Source:

Waihī had a population of 5,682 in the 2023 New Zealand census, an increase of 273 people (5.0%) since the 2018 census, and an increase of 1,011 people (21.6%) since the 2013 census. There were 2,745 males, 2,919 females and 18 people of other genders in 2,379 dwellings. 2.5% of people identified as LGBTIQ+. The median age was 50.5 years (compared with 38.1 years nationally). There were 924 people (16.3%) aged under 15 years, 765 (13.5%) aged 15 to 29, 2,289 (40.3%) aged 30 to 64, and 1,704 (30.0%) aged 65 or older.

People could identify as more than one ethnicity. The results were 83.2% European (Pākehā); 23.4% Māori; 4.3% Pasifika; 6.1% Asian; 0.6% Middle Eastern, Latin American and African New Zealanders (MELAA); and 1.9% other, which includes people giving their ethnicity as "New Zealander". English was spoken by 97.4%, Māori language by 4.5%, Samoan by 0.2%, and other languages by 6.9%. No language could be spoken by 1.8% (e.g. too young to talk). New Zealand Sign Language was known by 0.4%. The percentage of people born overseas was 17.4, compared with 28.8% nationally.

Religious affiliations were 27.5% Christian, 0.8% Hindu, 0.2% Islam, 1.5% Māori religious beliefs, 0.7% Buddhist, 0.8% New Age, and 2.3% other religions. People who answered that they had no religion were 57.1%, and 9.1% of people did not answer the census question.

Of those at least 15 years old, 567 (11.9%) people had a bachelor's or higher degree, 2,571 (54.0%) had a post-high school certificate or diploma, and 1,617 (34.0%) people exclusively held high school qualifications. The median income was $27,900, compared with $41,500 nationally. 231 people (4.9%) earned over $100,000 compared to 12.1% nationally. The employment status of those at least 15 was that 1,746 (36.7%) people were employed full-time, 564 (11.9%) were part-time, and 156 (3.3%) were unemployed.

Individual statistical areas
Name	Area (km^{2})	Population	Density (per km^{2})	Dwellings	Median age	Median income
Waihī North	2.78	1,866	671	771	51.8 years	$25,500
Waihī East	4.08	1,476	362	606	48.2 years	$29,400
Waihī South	2.69	2,340	870	1,005	51.1 years	$28,800
New Zealand					38.1 years	$41,500

=== Rural surrounds ===
Waihī Rural statistical area, which includes Waikino and Whiritoa, covers 375.57 km^{2} (145.01 sq mi) and had an estimated population of 2,530 as of June 2025, with a population density of 6.7 people per km^{2}.

Historical population for Waihī Rural
Year	Pop.	±% p.a.
2006	1,782	—
2013	1,803	+0.17%
2018	2,145	+3.53%
2023	2,424	+2.48%
The 2006 population is for a larger area of 375.75 km^{2}. Source:

Waihī Rural had a population of 2,424 in the 2023 New Zealand census, an increase of 279 people (13.0%) since the 2018 census, and an increase of 621 people (34.4%) since the 2013 census. There were 1,233 males, 1,185 females and 6 people of other genders in 888 dwellings. 1.6% of people identified as LGBTIQ+. The median age was 49.4 years (compared with 38.1 years nationally). There were 414 people (17.1%) aged under 15 years, 312 (12.9%) aged 15 to 29, 1,113 (45.9%) aged 30 to 64, and 582 (24.0%) aged 65 or older.

People could identify as more than one ethnicity. The results were 90.6% European (Pākehā); 16.6% Māori; 2.4% Pasifika; 2.7% Asian; 0.6% Middle Eastern, Latin American and African New Zealanders (MELAA); and 3.6% other, which includes people giving their ethnicity as "New Zealander". English was spoken by 98.0%, Māori language by 2.2%, Samoan by 0.4%, and other languages by 5.3%. No language could be spoken by 1.5% (e.g. too young to talk). New Zealand Sign Language was known by 0.6%. The percentage of people born overseas was 16.8, compared with 28.8% nationally.

Religious affiliations were 27.0% Christian, 0.6% Hindu, 0.1% Islam, 0.5% Māori religious beliefs, 0.6% Buddhist, 0.5% New Age, and 1.0% other religions. People who answered that they had no religion were 61.4%, and 8.8% of people did not answer the census question.

Of those at least 15 years old, 297 (14.8%) people had a bachelor's or higher degree, 1,161 (57.8%) had a post-high school certificate or diploma, and 546 (27.2%) people exclusively held high school qualifications. The median income was $33,000, compared with $41,500 nationally. 192 people (9.6%) earned over $100,000 compared to 12.1% nationally. The employment status of those at least 15 was that 867 (43.1%) people were employed full-time, 369 (18.4%) were part-time, and 60 (3.0%) were unemployed.

== History and culture ==
=== Mining township ===
Waihi is located in the Coromandel district, which was one of the great gold mining districts of the world. The township grew around the mining operations since the discovery of gold in 1878 by prospectors John McCombie and Robert Lee. The samples of rock they had sent to be assayed were not considered worthwhile, so they left the area.

Their claim was taken over by William Nicholl in 1879. He marked out 5 acres (20,000 m^{2}), calling his claim 'Martha' after a family member. Several smaller claims were later merged to form the Martha Company. By 1882 the first battery to break gold-bearing rock was in operation. The Martha Mine eventually grew into one of the world's most important gold and silver mines, after industrial cyanide processes made recovering gold from the low-grade ores easier. Waihi prospered with the mine, by 1908 being the fastest-growing town in the Auckland Province, three times the size of Hamilton.

Waihi was also a major centre of union unrest in New Zealand during the early years of the 20th century. The 1912 miners' strike led to violence, including the death of unionist Fred Evans in an incident which still causes some resentment in the town.

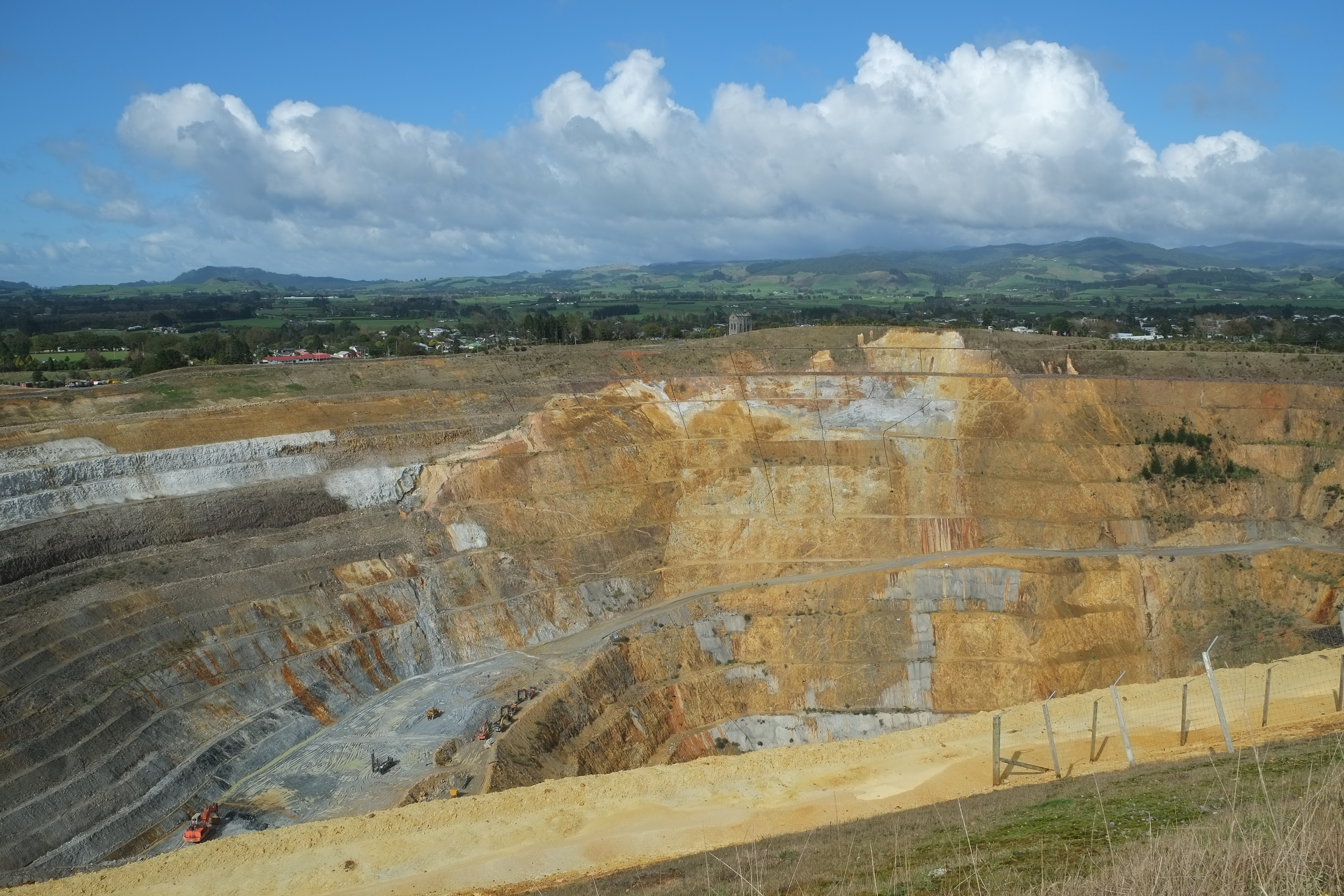
Martha Mine, Waihi

By 1952, when the mighty Martha Mine closed, around 5.6 million ounces (174,160 kg) of gold and 38.4 million ounces (1,193,180 kg) of silver had been produced from 11,932,000 tonnes of ore. Mining stopped in 1952 after a total of 160 km of tunnels had been driven into the quartz of Martha Hill, not because the Martha had run out of gold, but rather because of fixed gold prices, lack of manpower, and increasing costs. Mining in the Coromandel Peninsula had otherwise ceased by the 1980s.

However, mining later resumed, with some protests against it during the 1987 consent process. Plans to stop operations in the 2000s were eventually shelved as well, and the mines new owner OceanaGold is investing in extending the further economic life of the mine and the underground operations. As of 2009, the mine constituted 25–30% of the local economy.

The Golden Cross mine was a gold and silver mine in the neighbouring Waitekauri Valley. It first operated as an underground gold mine from 1895 to 1920. Gold and silver was mined by underground and open pit methods from 1991 to 1998.

=== Railways ===
In November 1905, a branch line railway was opened to Waihi from Paeroa; this eventually evolved into the East Coast Main Trunk Railway, which reached Taneatua in 1928. By the 1960s, traffic volumes for the port of Tauranga had outgrown the capacity of the circuitous line through Waihi and a deviation to the south was built, including the Kaimai Tunnel. It opened in 1978, making the line through Waihi redundant, but the Goldfields Railway was established to save the six kilometres of railway between Waihi and Waikino. The railway continues to operate today as Goldfields Railway and is a popular tourist attraction.

=== Counterculture era ===
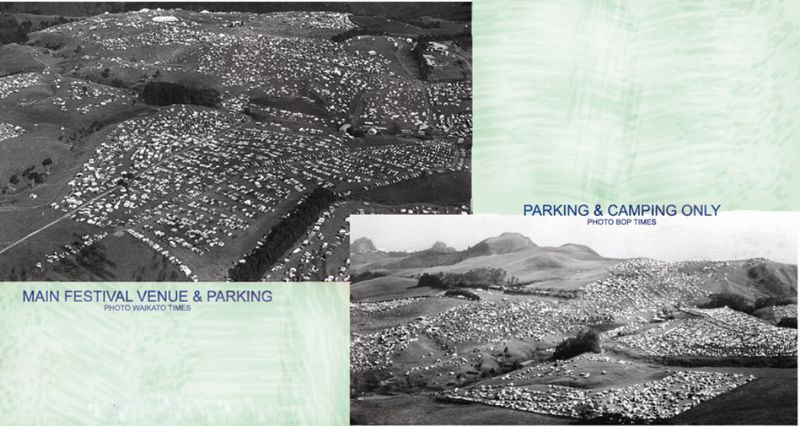
The Nambassa festival in 1979.

In the 1970s Waihi saw a large influx of hippies in search of environmentally friendly alternative lifestyles settle there and around the Waikino area. These young counterculture proponents brought with them numerous cottage industries which helped supplement Waihi's economy. The Nambassa rock and alternative festivals were held around Waihi and Waikino between 1975 and 1982, increasing the population by around 10,000–75,000 for a few days each year and bringing revenue to the town. Temporary tent cities were established on the Northern end of Waihi on farms up Landlyst Rd at Golden Valley, to accommodate festival goers.

=== Recent history ===
In the late 1980s a new open pit started operations over the top of the old underground mine. This operation is nearing its completion, however recent plans to cutback the pit wall and recent underground mining have postponed the promised lake and recreational area. A new underground mine called Favona is in operation near the processing plant to the east of Waihi. The mining company have stated that it is impossible to create the lake while underground operations are occurring near the site because the low-level water table connects with the underground mine which has to be de-watered.

In the late 1990s several properties had to be condemned and roads such as Brickfield Road, Pipe Lane, Junction Road and parts of Bulltown Road, Hobson Street, Grey Street, Slevin Street, Newman Street, Barry Road, and main road Seddon Avenue permanently closed after the land under them subsided as a result of the collapse of old underground mine workings, with visible holes and cracks on the surface. In December 2001, a home adjacent to Martha Pit collapsed into historical workings, 14 neighbouring homes were affected, some never able to return to get personal belongings. Another 31 homes were also bought once more areas were identified to be at high, medium or low risk of collapse into historical workings adjacent to the pit. Today the mine's smoko room sits near this site. Noise, dust, blasting vibrations continue to cause stress for some residents as operations in the pit continue. The iconic Pumphouse has been moved to ensure its safety which also allows for the mine pit to be widened and more gold retrieved from the site the pumphouse was originally housed.

Mine management has received positive responses for its rigorous environmental effects control procedures and its commitment to the local community in terms of consultation and financial assistance. This has, amongst other things, led to the mine management company, Newmont Waihi Gold, receiving the 'Advanced Sustainable Business Award' from Environment Waikato, the Regional Council of the area. Despite all these attempts some of the mine's neighbours do not qualify for compensation for the mine's impact.

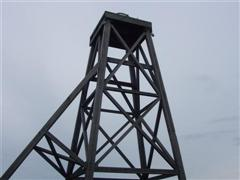
A replica of the famous Waihi Poppet Head, situated at the Northern End of Waihi Township.

Mining remains the major employer in the area thanks to the company postponing the long promised mine closure and lake formation in 2007. OceanaGold will stay until 2017 when consents expire, unless they find more resources when they will apply to stay. Until the electrical appliance industry was deregulated in New Zealand in the 1980s, Waihi had a television assembly plant operated first by Akrad then by Philips which employed 400 locally and 1500 nationwide.

=== Marae ===
Waihi has one marae, Waihi Community Marae.

- Waihi Marae, with Tapeka meeting house, is near Tokaanu, and not affiliated nor even close, being down by Turangi, near Taupo..and is Tuwharetoa.

Waihi Town is part of Pare Hauraki area.

== Current mining ==
OceanaGold currently operates the Favona, Trio and Correnso underground gold and silver mines under the eastern end of the Waihi township. The Correnso underground mine is the current active operation and is producing approximately 100,000 ounces of gold each year.

The Martha open pit is not currently active due to a slip on the north wall in April 2016, but continues to draw large tourist numbers visiting the pit and nearby Pumphouse at the top of Waihi's main street.

== Education ==
Waihi College is a Year 7–13 secondary school with a roll of 552. The college was established as a District High School in 1932 and became a Forms 3–7 College in 1954. It moved to its current site in 1959. In 1976 it extended its roll to cover forms 1 and 2. Forms 1–7 are now known as years 7–13.

Waihi Central School is a contributing Year 1–6 primary school, school with a roll of 114.

Waihi East Primary School is a contributing Year 1–6 primary school, established in 1907, with a roll of 228.

St Joseph's Catholic School is a full Year 1–8 primary state integrated school with a roll of 56.

All these schools are coeducational. The roll numbers are as of July 2026.

== Renumbering project ==
In March 2016 a renumbering project was put into place by Hauraki District Council halving Waihi streets such as Union Street, Rosemont Road, Seddon Avenue and Toomey Street in order to meet demands by the NZ Post office making it easier to find addresses. New street names include Amaranth Street, Montrose Road and Park Lane. Parry Palm Avenue which begins at the entrance from Paeroa now expands to the Martin Road and Baber Street intersection while Kenny Street becomes Waihi's longest road beginning at the infamous 'Rocket Park' (Victoria Park) expanding to the Waihi/Whangamata road. The renumbering project affected 143 Waihi properties and 650 Waihi residents. Montrose Road was originally going to be named Nicholl Street in honour of William Nicholl who developed the Martha Mine, but was at fault due to a last minute change.

Cornish Pumphouse (1903) in its current location during the annual Waihi Beach Hop Warm Up Party.

== Cornish Pumphouse ==
The "Cornish Pumphouse" was originally built in a different location next to the Martha Mine in 1904 to accommodate a large Cornish steam engine designed to pump water out of the mine. The building's design originated from one used in tin mines in Cornwall, England.

The horizontal Cornish pump was used up to 1913 to raise water from a depth of around 400 metres (1,300 ft) via the adjacent No 5 shaft at a rate of over 400,000 litres per hour. After 1913, electric pumps were used to dewater the mine, but the pumphose was kept in working order until 1929 as a backup.

From the 1930s onwards, the building had been stripped of all machinery and left in an increasingly derelict state. In 1983, the building was registered as a Historic Place Category 1 with Heritage New Zealand due to its historical importance as one of the country's principal industrial monuments.

In 2001, the area surrounding the pumphouse was fenced off, following subsidence in nearby Barry Road. Investigations reached the conclusion that the only way to protect the building was to relocate it to a safer site. The operation to move the Cornish Pumphouse to a site 300 metres (980 ft) away was started in 2006 with the installation of internal steel bracing and the building of a relocation causeway.

Later in the year, the building, weighing 1,840 tonnes, was moved over the course of three months along teflon-coated concrete beams to its present location, which is easily accessible via a footpath from Seddon Street.

Some internal steel bracing remains installed in the building and it is able to be viewed by the public during daylight hours.

== Climate ==
Climate data for Waihi (1981–2010)
Month	Jan	Feb	Mar	Apr	May	Jun	Jul	Aug	Sep	Oct	Nov	Dec	Year
Mean daily maximum °C (°F)	24.3 (75.7)	23.9 (75.0)	22.2 (72.0)	19.2 (66.6)	16.5 (61.7)	14.2 (57.6)	13.5 (56.3)	14.2 (57.6)	16.0 (60.8)	18.0 (64.4)	19.9 (67.8)	22.6 (72.7)	18.7 (65.7)
Daily mean °C (°F)	19.3 (66.7)	19.3 (66.7)	17.3 (63.1)	14.5 (58.1)	12.0 (53.6)	9.9 (49.8)	9.3 (48.7)	10.0 (50.0)	11.9 (53.4)	13.7 (56.7)	15.3 (59.5)	17.7 (63.9)	14.2 (57.5)
Mean daily minimum °C (°F)	14.3 (57.7)	14.8 (58.6)	12.5 (54.5)	9.9 (49.8)	7.5 (45.5)	5.5 (41.9)	5.0 (41.0)	5.7 (42.3)	7.8 (46.0)	9.3 (48.7)	10.7 (51.3)	12.9 (55.2)	9.7 (49.4)
Average rainfall mm (inches)	133 (5.2)	143 (5.6)	200 (7.9)	172 (6.8)	175 (6.9)	227 (8.9)	218 (8.6)	221 (8.7)	186 (7.3)	148 (5.8)	138 (5.4)	156 (6.1)	2,117 (83.2)
Mean monthly sunshine hours	218.0	170.7	144.4	152.2	115.0	86.5	120.7	116.5	119.8	171.6	166.5	180.1	1,762
Source: NIWA (rain 1961–1990)
