= Ngāti Hako =

Māori iwi (tribe) in Aotearoa New Zealand

- Iwi (tribe) in Māoridom
- Rohe (region): Hauraki

Ngāti Hako is a Māori iwi of New Zealand and are said to be the earliest settlers of the Hauraki region. In the 2013 New Zealand census, 1,392 people claimed to be affiliated with the iwi, with their population concentrating in Waikato and the Auckland Region.

== See also ==
- List of Māori iwi
