= Ngatea =

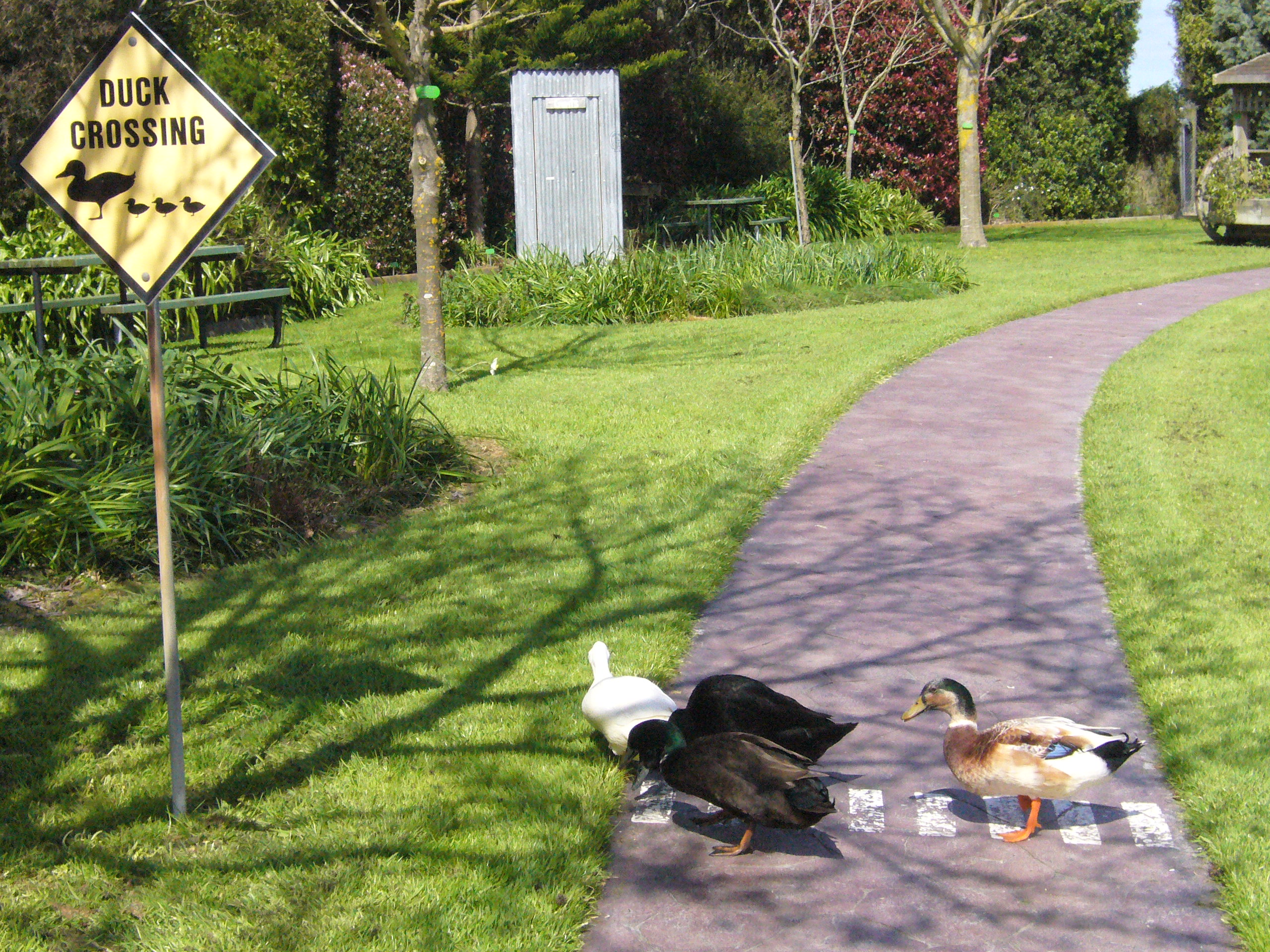
- Interactive map of Ngatea
- Coordinates: 37°17′S 175°30′E
- Country: New Zealand
- Region: Waikato region
- District: Hauraki District
- Ward: Plains Ward
- Electorates: Coromandel; Hauraki-Waikato (Māori)

Government
  - Territorial Authority: Hauraki District Council
  - Regional council: Waikato Regional Council
  - Mayor of Hauraki: Toby Adams
  - Coromandel MP: Scott Simpson
  - Hauraki-Waikato MP: Hana-Rawhiti Maipi-Clarke

Area
  - Total: 1.75 km^{2} (0.68 sq mi)

Population (June 2025)
  - Total: 1,600
  - Density: 910/km^{2} (2,400/sq mi)

Ngatea (Māori: Ngātea) is a small town on the Hauraki Plains in the North Island of New Zealand. It is located 18 kilometres southwest of Thames and 70 kilometres southeast of Auckland. Ngatea lies on the Piako River, eight kilometres south of its outflow into the Firth of Thames.

Ngatea is the 'service centre' for the farming area of the Hauraki Plains. It was established in the 1900s as a result of a unique series of canals and stop banks which drained the land and produced rich farmlands for dairy production.

The town also acts as a service town for motorists travelling from Auckland to the Coromandel Peninsula and Bay of Plenty via State Highway 2.

== Demographics ==
Stats NZ describes Ngatea as a small urban area. It covers 1.75 km^{2} (0.68 sq mi) and had an estimated population of 1,600 as of June 2025, with a population density of 914 people per km^{2}.

Historical population
| Year | Pop. | ±% p.a. |
|---|---|---|
| 2006 | 1,182 | — |
| 2013 | 1,245 | +0.74% |
| 2018 | 1,437 | +2.91% |
| 2023 | 1,548 | +1.50% |
The 2006 population is for a larger area of 3.35 km^{2}. Source:

Ngatea had a population of 1,548 in the 2023 New Zealand census, an increase of 111 people (7.7%) since the 2018 census, and an increase of 303 people (24.3%) since the 2013 census. There were 729 males, 816 females and 6 people of other genders in 621 dwellings. 1.7% of people identified as LGBTIQ+. The median age was 47.0 years (compared with 38.1 years nationally). There were 291 people (18.8%) aged under 15 years, 219 (14.1%) aged 15 to 29, 633 (40.9%) aged 30 to 64, and 408 (26.4%) aged 65 or older.

People could identify as more than one ethnicity. The results were 87.0% European (Pākehā); 16.9% Māori; 2.5% Pasifika; 5.4% Asian; 0.4% Middle Eastern, Latin American and African New Zealanders (MELAA); and 1.9% other, which includes people giving their ethnicity as "New Zealander". English was spoken by 97.7%, Māori language by 3.3%, Samoan by 0.2%, and other languages by 7.4%. No language could be spoken by 1.4% (e.g. too young to talk). New Zealand Sign Language was known by 0.6%. The percentage of people born overseas was 15.9, compared with 28.8% nationally.

Religious affiliations were 29.7% Christian, 0.8% Hindu, 0.2% Islam, 1.0% Māori religious beliefs, 0.6% Buddhist, 0.6% New Age, 0.2% Jewish, and 1.4% other religions. People who answered that they had no religion were 58.7%, and 7.4% of people did not answer the census question.

Of those at least 15 years old, 174 (13.8%) people had a bachelor's or higher degree, 723 (57.5%) had a post-high school certificate or diploma, and 363 (28.9%) people exclusively held high school qualifications. The median income was $36,600, compared with $41,500 nationally. 102 people (8.1%) earned over $100,000 compared to 12.1% nationally. The employment status of those at least 15 was that 564 (44.9%) people were employed full-time, 171 (13.6%) were part-time, and 30 (2.4%) were unemployed.

== Education ==
Ngatea has two schools:

- Ngatea Primary School is a co-educational state primary school, with a roll of 292 as of July 2026. The school opened in 1960.
- Hauraki Plains College is a co-educational state secondary school, with a roll of 866 as of July 2026. In 1912, the school was first opened and called Orchard School, with a roll of 15 students. In 1923 its name was changed to Ngatea District High School. The Government attempted to close the school amid declining attendance, however this was unsuccessful due to unprecedented community support. In 1963, the name was once again changed to Hauraki Plains College.

== Climate ==
Climate data for Ngatea (1951–1980)
| Month | Jan | Feb | Mar | Apr | May | Jun | Jul | Aug | Sep | Oct | Nov | Dec | Year |
|---|---|---|---|---|---|---|---|---|---|---|---|---|---|
| Mean daily maximum °C (°F) | 24.2 (75.6) | 24.8 (76.6) | 23.4 (74.1) | 20.7 (69.3) | 17.4 (63.3) | 14.9 (58.8) | 14.2 (57.6) | 15.1 (59.2) | 16.8 (62.2) | 18.6 (65.5) | 20.6 (69.1) | 22.6 (72.7) | 19.4 (67.0) |
| Daily mean °C (°F) | 18.2 (64.8) | 18.7 (65.7) | 17.5 (63.5) | 14.9 (58.8) | 11.8 (53.2) | 9.8 (49.6) | 8.9 (48.0) | 10.0 (50.0) | 11.5 (52.7) | 13.3 (55.9) | 15.1 (59.2) | 16.7 (62.1) | 13.9 (57.0) |
| Mean daily minimum °C (°F) | 12.2 (54.0) | 12.6 (54.7) | 11.5 (52.7) | 9.0 (48.2) | 6.2 (43.2) | 4.6 (40.3) | 3.6 (38.5) | 4.9 (40.8) | 6.2 (43.2) | 8.0 (46.4) | 9.5 (49.1) | 10.7 (51.3) | 8.3 (46.9) |
| Average rainfall mm (inches) | 59 (2.3) | 86 (3.4) | 84 (3.3) | 103 (4.1) | 106 (4.2) | 118 (4.6) | 116 (4.6) | 104 (4.1) | 98 (3.9) | 87 (3.4) | 79 (3.1) | 84 (3.3) | 1,124 (44.3) |
Source: NIWA
