= Kerepehi =

- Interactive map of Kerepehi
- Coordinates: 37°18′S 175°33′E
- Country: New Zealand
- Region: Waikato region
- District: Hauraki District
- Ward: Plains Ward
- Electorates: Coromandel; Hauraki-Waikato (Māori)

Government
  - Territorial Authority: Hauraki District Council
  - Regional council: Waikato Regional Council
  - Mayor of Thames-Coromandel: Peter Revell
  - Coromandel MP: Scott Simpson
  - Hauraki-Waikato MP: Hana-Rawhiti Maipi-Clarke

Area
  - Total: 2.18 km^{2} (0.84 sq mi)

Population (June 2025)
  - Total: 590
  - Density: 270/km^{2} (700/sq mi)

Kerepehi is a rural community in the Hauraki District and Waikato region of New Zealand's North Island. The alternative spelling Kerepeehi was in use until 1933.

== Demographics ==
Statistics New Zealand describes Kerepēhi as a rural settlement. It covers 2.18 km^{2} (0.84 sq mi) and had an estimated population of 590 as of June 2025, with a population density of 271 people per km^{2}. It is part of the larger Hauraki Plains South statistical area.

Historical population for Kerepehi
Year	Pop.	±% p.a.
2006	486	—
2013	405	−2.57%
2018	510	+4.72%
2023	561	+1.92%

Kerepēhi had a population of 561 in the 2023 New Zealand census, an increase of 51 people (10.0%) since the 2018 census, and an increase of 156 people (38.5%) since the 2013 census. There were 291 males and 267 females in 192 dwellings. 1.6% of people identified as LGBTIQ+. The median age was 35.8 years (compared with 38.1 years nationally). There were 132 people (23.5%) aged under 15 years, 105 (18.7%) aged 15 to 29, 249 (44.4%) aged 30 to 64, and 75 (13.4%) aged 65 or older.

People could identify as more than one ethnicity. The results were 67.4% European (Pākehā), 46.0% Māori, 7.0% Pasifika, 1.1% Asian, and 3.2% other, which includes people giving their ethnicity as "New Zealander". English was spoken by 96.8%, Māori language by 10.2%, and other languages by 2.7%. No language could be spoken by 2.7% (e.g. too young to talk). New Zealand Sign Language was known by 1.6%. The percentage of people born overseas was 7.5, compared with 28.8% nationally.

Religious affiliations were 16.6% Christian, 7.5% Māori religious beliefs, 0.5% Buddhist, 0.5% New Age, and 0.5% other religions. People who answered that they had no religion were 65.2%, and 9.6% of people did not answer the census question.

Of those at least 15 years old, 24 (5.6%) people had a bachelor's or higher degree, 273 (63.6%) had a post-high school certificate or diploma, and 138 (32.2%) people exclusively held high school qualifications. The median income was $35,600, compared with $41,500 nationally. 9 people (2.1%) earned over $100,000 compared to 12.1% nationally. The employment status of those at least 15 was that 222 (51.7%) people were employed full-time, 42 (9.8%) were part-time, and 18 (4.2%) were unemployed.

=== Hauraki Plains South ===
Hauraki Plains South, which also includes Kaihere and Patetonga, covers 251.39 km^{2} (97.06 sq mi) and had an estimated population of 1,630 as of June 2025, with a population density of 6.5 people per km^{2}.

Historical population for Hauraki Plains South
Year	Pop.	±% p.a.
2006	1,536	—
2013	1,395	−1.37%
2018	1,533	+1.90%
2023	1,551	+0.23%

Hauraki Plains South had a population of 1,551 in the 2023 New Zealand census, an increase of 18 people (1.2%) since the 2018 census, and an increase of 156 people (11.2%) since the 2013 census. There were 789 males and 759 females in 537 dwellings. 2.1% of people identified as LGBTIQ+. The median age was 36.4 years (compared with 38.1 years nationally). There were 381 people (24.6%) aged under 15 years, 255 (16.4%) aged 15 to 29, 702 (45.3%) aged 30 to 64, and 210 (13.5%) aged 65 or older.

People could identify as more than one ethnicity. The results were 77.8% European (Pākehā); 26.7% Māori; 5.4% Pasifika; 4.8% Asian; 0.6% Middle Eastern, Latin American and African New Zealanders (MELAA); and 2.5% other, which includes people giving their ethnicity as "New Zealander". English was spoken by 96.9%, Māori language by 5.6%, Samoan by 0.2%, and other languages by 5.8%. No language could be spoken by 2.5% (e.g. too young to talk). New Zealand Sign Language was known by 0.8%. The percentage of people born overseas was 13.5, compared with 28.8% nationally.

Religious affiliations were 23.4% Christian, 1.2% Hindu, 0.2% Islam, 3.7% Māori religious beliefs, 0.6% Buddhist, 0.2% New Age, and 1.5% other religions. People who answered that they had no religion were 60.9%, and 8.7% of people did not answer the census question.

Of those at least 15 years old, 120 (10.3%) people had a bachelor's or higher degree, 693 (59.2%) had a post-high school certificate or diploma, and 354 (30.3%) people exclusively held high school qualifications. The median income was $41,900, compared with $41,500 nationally. 72 people (6.2%) earned over $100,000 compared to 12.1% nationally. The employment status of those at least 15 was that 645 (55.1%) people were employed full-time, 138 (11.8%) were part-time, and 30 (2.6%) were unemployed.

== Education ==
Kerepehi School is a co-educational state primary school, with a roll of 67 as of July 2025.
