= Hauraki District =

- Territorial authority district
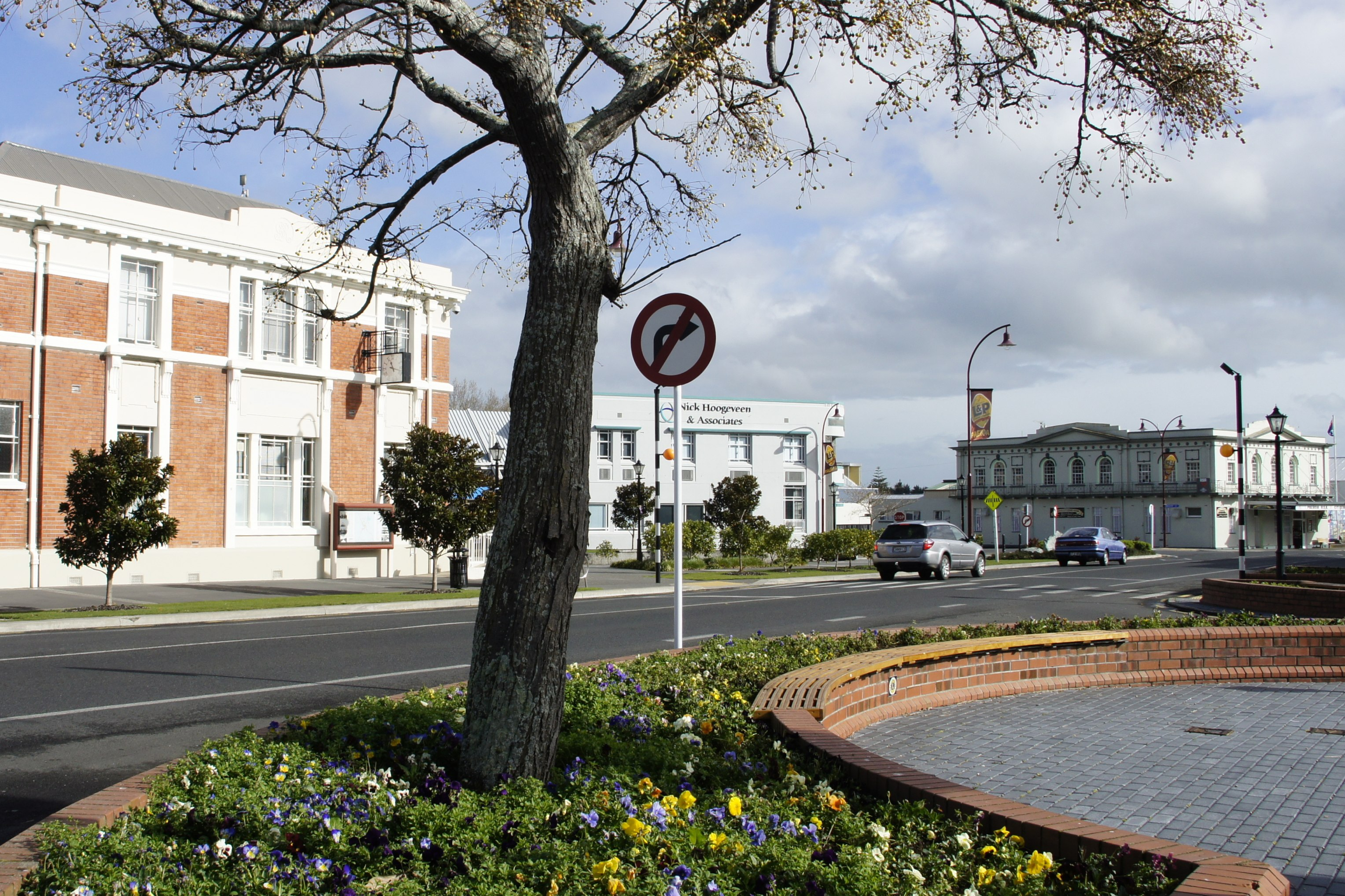
- Normanby Road, Paeroa, with the former Paeroa Post Office building at left

- Hauraki district within the North Island
- Coordinates: 37°22′S 175°37′E
- Country: New Zealand
- Region: Waikato Region
- Wards: Paeroa; Plains; Waihi
- Seat: Paeroa

Government
  - Mayor: Toby Adams
  - Territorial authority: Hauraki District Council

Area
  - Land: 1,270.12 km^{2} (490.40 sq mi)

Population (June 2025)
  - Total: 22,100
  - Density: 17.4/km^{2} (45.1/sq mi)
- Time zone: UTC+12 (NZST)
  - Summer (DST): UTC+13 (NZDT)
- Postcode(s): Map of postcodes
- Website: Hauraki District Council

Hauraki District is a territorial authority governed by the Hauraki District Council within the Waikato region of New Zealand. The seat of the council is at Paeroa.

The area covered by the district extends from the southwest coast of the Firth of Thames southeast towards Te Aroha, although that town lies beyond its boundaries. It extends eastwards to the Bay of Plenty coast, taking in the southernmost part of the Coromandel Peninsula. The rest of the peninsula is part of Thames-Coromandel District.

Features of the district include the Karangahake Gorge, Whiritoa, the Hauraki Plains, Ngatea and the gold mining town of Waihi.

== Demographics ==
Hauraki District covers 1,270.12 km^{2} (490.40 sq mi) and had an estimated population of 22,100 as of June 2025, with a population density of 17.4 people per km^{2}. 4,600 live in Paeroa and 5,850 in Waihi.

Historical population
| Year | Pop. | ±% p.a. |
|---|---|---|
| 2006 | 17,856 | — |
| 2013 | 17,808 | −0.04% |
| 2018 | 20,022 | +2.37% |
| 2023 | 21,318 | +1.26% |

Hauraki District had a population of 21,318 in the 2023 New Zealand census, an increase of 1,296 people (6.5%) since the 2018 census, and an increase of 3,510 people (19.7%) since the 2013 census. There were 10,458 males, 10,797 females and 66 people of other genders in 8,343 dwellings. 2.1% of people identified as LGBTIQ+. The median age was 47.6 years (compared with 38.1 years nationally). There were 3,792 people (17.8%) aged under 15 years, 3,000 (14.1%) aged 15 to 29, 9,039 (42.4%) aged 30 to 64, and 5,487 (25.7%) aged 65 or older.

People could identify as more than one ethnicity. The results were 83.6% European (Pākehā); 24.1% Māori; 3.6% Pasifika; 4.5% Asian; 0.5% Middle Eastern, Latin American and African New Zealanders (MELAA); and 2.5% other, which includes people giving their ethnicity as "New Zealander". English was spoken by 97.6%, Māori language by 4.6%, Samoan by 0.2% and other languages by 5.7%. No language could be spoken by 1.7% (e.g. too young to talk). New Zealand Sign Language was known by 0.5%. The percentage of people born overseas was 14.4, compared with 28.8% nationally.

Religious affiliations were 27.3% Christian, 0.6% Hindu, 0.1% Islam, 1.7% Māori religious beliefs, 0.6% Buddhist, 0.6% New Age, 0.1% Jewish, and 1.5% other religions. People who answered that they had no religion were 59.0%, and 8.7% of people did not answer the census question.

Of those at least 15 years old, 1,659 (9.5%) people had a bachelor's or higher degree, 9,870 (56.3%) had a post-high school certificate or diploma, and 5,532 (31.6%) people exclusively held high school qualifications. The median income was $32,000, compared with $41,500 nationally. 1,131 people (6.5%) earned over $100,000 compared to 12.1% nationally. The employment status of those at least 15 was that 7,464 (42.6%) people were employed full-time, 2,433 (13.9%) were part-time, and 489 (2.8%) were unemployed.

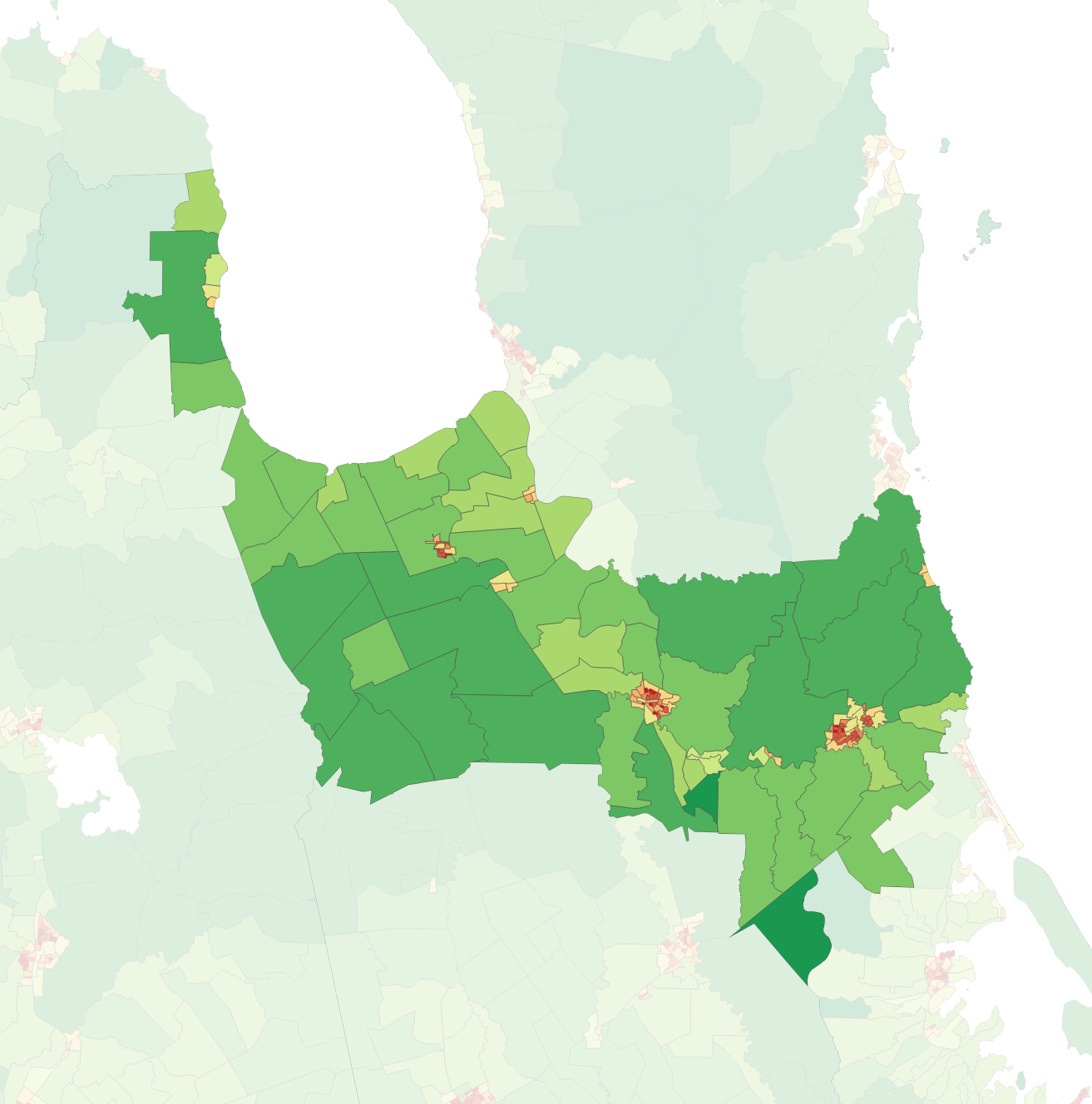
Population density in the 2023 census

Individual wards
| Name | Area (km^{2}) | Population | Density (per km^{2}) | Dwellings | Median age | Median income |
|---|---|---|---|---|---|---|
| Plains Ward | 605.56 | 6,768 | 11.2 | 2,559 | 42.7 years | $39,100 |
| Paeroa Ward | 279.44 | 6,447 | 23.1 | 2,517 | 49.1 years | $30,800 |
| Waihi Ward | 385.12 | 8,106 | 21.0 | 3,267 | 50.1 years | $28,900 |
| New Zealand | | | | | 38.1 years | $41,500 |

== Local government ==
In 2010, the neighbouring Franklin District was abolished with the creation of the Auckland Council, and a stretch of the southwest coast of the Firth of Thames, around Kaiaua, was added to the Hauraki District.

== Populated places ==
Hauraki District consists of the following towns, localities, settlements and communities:

- Paeroa Ward:
  - Awaiti
  - Hikutaia South (Note: Partly shared with Thames-Coromandel District.)
  - Karangahake
  - Komata North
  - Komata Reefs
  - Komata
  - Mackaytown
  - Maratoto
  - Netherton
  - Paeroa
  - Te Moananui
  - Tirohia
- Plains Ward:
  - Horahia
  - Kaiaua (Note: Formerly part of the defunct Franklin District.)
  - Kaihere
  - Kerepehi
  - Kopuarahi
  - Mangatarata
  - Miranda (Note: Also known as Pūkorokoro.)
  - Ngatea
  - Orongo
  - Patetonga
  - Pipiroa
  - Torehape
  - Turua
  - Waharau
  - Waitakaruru
  - Whakatīwai
- Waihi Ward:
  - Golden Cross
  - Golden Valley
  - Waiharakeke
  - Waihi
  - Waikino
  - Waimata
  - Waitawheta
  - Waitekauri
  - Whiritoa
