= Pipiroa =

- Interactive map of Pipiroa
- Coordinates: 37.216°S 175.486°E
- Country: New Zealand
- Region: Waikato region
- District: Hauraki District
- Ward: Plains Ward
- Electorates: Coromandel; Hauraki-Waikato (Māori)

Government
  - Territorial Authority: Hauraki District Council
  - Regional council: Waikato Regional Council
  - Mayor of Thames-Coromandel: Peter Revell
  - Coromandel MP: Scott Simpson
  - Hauraki-Waikato MP: Hana-Rawhiti Maipi-Clarke

Area
  - Total: 10.12 km^{2} (3.91 sq mi)

Population (2023 Census)
  - Total: 129
  - Density: 12.7/km^{2} (33.0/sq mi)

Pipiroa is a rural community in the Hauraki District and Waikato region of New Zealand's North Island.

The New Zealand Ministry for Culture and Heritage gives a translation of "long pipi" for Pipiroa.

== Demographics ==
Pipiroa is in an SA1 statistical area which covers 10.12 km^{2} (3.91 sq mi). The SA1 area is part of the larger Hauraki Plains North statistical area.

Historic population for Pipiroa and surrounds
Year	Pop.	±% p.a.
2006	99	—
2013	102	+0.43%
2018	117	+2.78%
2023	129	+1.97%

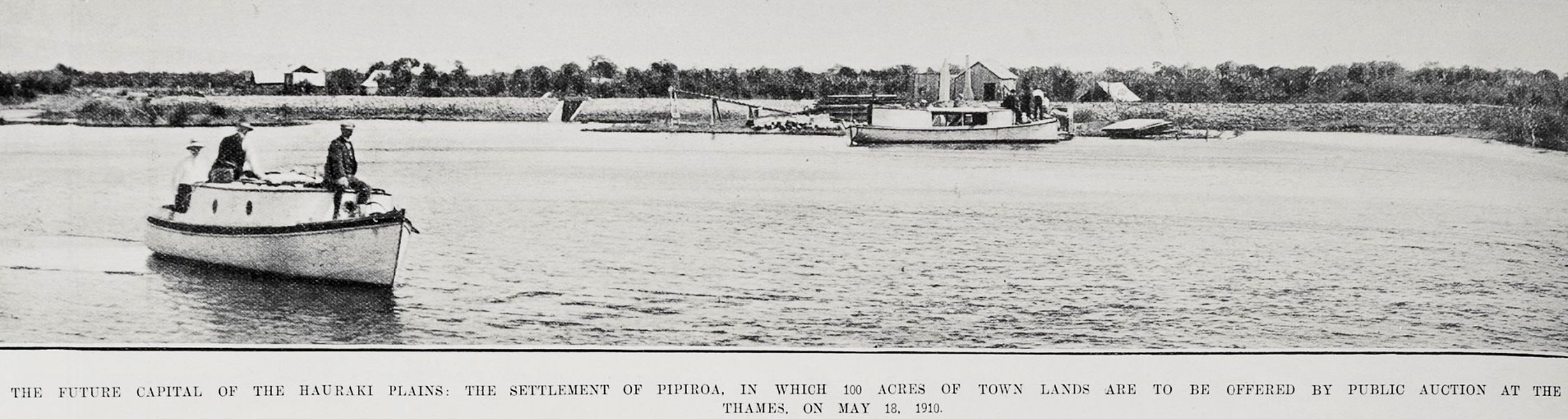
Pipiroa 1910 - an optimistic caption

The SA1 area had a population of 129 in the 2023 New Zealand census, an increase of 12 people (10.3%) since the 2018 census, and an increase of 27 people (26.5%) since the 2013 census. There were 66 males and 60 females in 45 dwellings. 2.3% of people identified as LGBTIQ+. The median age was 44.6 years (compared with 38.1 years nationally). There were 24 people (18.6%) aged under 15 years, 21 (16.3%) aged 15 to 29, 54 (41.9%) aged 30 to 64, and 27 (20.9%) aged 65 or older.

People could identify as more than one ethnicity. The results were 90.7% European (Pākehā), 16.3% Māori, 2.3% Pasifika, and 4.7% Asian. English was spoken by 97.7%, Māori language by 2.3%, and other languages by 4.7%. No language could be spoken by 2.3% (e.g. too young to talk). The percentage of people born overseas was 4.7, compared with 28.8% nationally.

Religious affiliations were 20.9% Christian, and 4.7% other religions. People who answered that they had no religion were 60.5%, and 11.6% of people did not answer the census question.

Of those at least 15 years old, 6 (5.7%) people had a bachelor's or higher degree, 69 (65.7%) had a post-high school certificate or diploma, and 36 (34.3%) people exclusively held high school qualifications. The median income was $41,700, compared with $41,500 nationally. 6 people (5.7%) earned over $100,000 compared to 12.1% nationally. The employment status of those at least 15 was that 51 (48.6%) people were employed full-time, 15 (14.3%) were part-time, and 3 (2.9%) were unemployed.
