= Mayor of Thames-Coromandel =

Mayor in New Zealand

- Incumbent; Peter Revell since 2025
- Style: His/Her Worship
- Seat: Thames
- Term length: 3 years, renewable
- Formation: 1975
- First holder: Henry Kennedy
- Deputy: John Grant
- Salary: $141,188
- Website: Official website

The mayor of Thames-Coromandel is the elected head of local government in the Thames-Coromandel District of New Zealand's North Island; one of 67 mayors in the country. The mayor is based in the town of Thames. The mayor presides over the Thames-Coromandel District Council and is directly elected using the first-past-the-post method

The current mayor is Peter Revell, first elected in October 2025 during that year's local elections.

The office has existed since 1975, when the Thames Borough and the Coromandel County were amalgamated. Philippa Barriball was the first female mayor when she was elected in 2004.

== List of office holders ==
There have been ten mayors of Thames-Coromandel. The following is a complete list:

| | Name | Portrait | Term |
|---|---|---|---|
| 1 | Henry Kennedy | | 1975–1977 |
| 2 | Leonard Braddock | | 1977–1983 |
| 3 | John Campbell | | 1983–1989 |
| 4 | Alasdair Thompson | | 1989–1998 |
| 5 | Chris Lux | | 1998–2004 |
| 6 | Philippa Barriball | | 2004–2010 |
| 7 | Glenn Leach | | 2010–2016 |
| 8 | Sandra Goudie | | 2016–2022 |
| 9 | Len Salt | | 2022–2025 |
| 10 | Peter Revell | | 2025–present |

=== Deputy mayors ===
| Name | Term | Mayor |
|---|---|---|
| Bruce Scott | 1992–1995 | Thompson |
| Philippa Barriball | 2001–2004 | Lux |
| Adrian Catran | 2004–2010 | Barriball |
| Peter French | 2010–2016 | Leach |
| Tony Brljevich | 2016–2022 | Goudie |
| Terry Walker | 2022–2025 | Salt |
| John Grant | 2025–present | Revell |
