= Hikutaia =

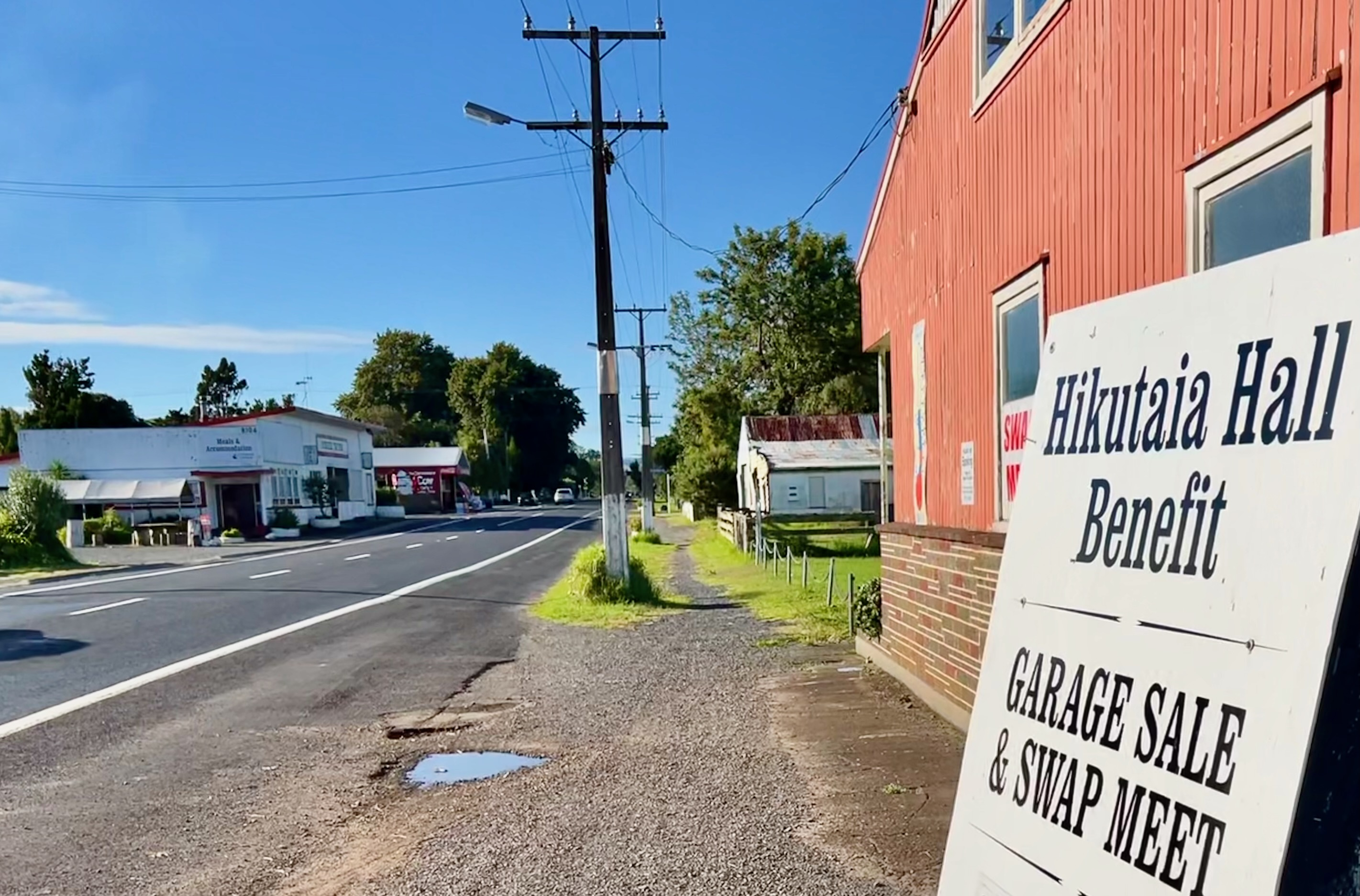
- Hikutaia in 2023 viewed from the Hauraki Rail Trail

- Location within North Island
- Coordinates: 37°17′32″S 175°39′17″E
- Country: New Zealand
- Region: Waikato
- District: Thames-Coromandel District

Population (2013)
  - Total: 42

Hikutaia is a locality on the Hauraki Plains of New Zealand. It lies on State Highway 26, south east of Thames and north of Paeroa. The Hikutaia River runs from the Coromandel Range through the area to join the Waihou River.

== History and culture ==
The area has a rich history of Māori settlement, with several pā in the vicinity.

James Cook and Joseph Banks rowed up the Waihou River on 20 November 1769 and disembarked near Hikutaia. They were impressed by the kahikatea which formed a dense forest in the area. Banks described it as "the finest timber my Eyes ever beheld".

In 1794, acting on Cook's description of the forest, Captain Dell and his crew of the ship Fancy camped in a place they called Graves End, which is now Hikutaia, and took 213 kahikatea trees with assistance from local Māori. At least five ships came for more timber by the end of the century. Four Europeans were living at Hikutaia in 1799, assisting the trade in timber and the sale of Māori labour. These men lived with and married Māori. Cultural misunderstandings between traders and Māori sometimes led to violence.

Hikutaia was known for its cheese factory in the mid-1960s. The factory opened in 1917.

=== Marae ===
Hikutaiā Marae is a traditional meeting ground for the local Ngāti Maru tribe. Ngāti Paoa have also traditionally lived in the area.

== Education ==
Hikutaia School is a coeducational full primary (years 1–8) school with a decile rating of 4 and a roll of 86.

== Railway station ==
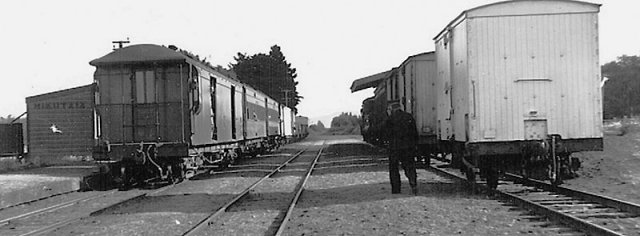
Hikutaia station

Hikutaia had a railway station from 1898 to 1995 on the Thames Branch. Larkins and O'Brien built the Kopu to Hikutaia section from August 1885 for £10,879, had made good progress by January 1886 and completed that section in May 1887. Heath and Irwin started building the Hikutaia to Paeroa section in January 1887. The road to the station was built in 1888. Work on the Paeroa to Te Aroha section began in 1892, but in 1895 it was said, "a Parliamentary faction stopped the workers in their work". Work on the bridges resumed in 1897, including the Hikutaia River bridge, with spans of 3 x 40 ft (12 m), 13 ft (4.0 m), and 11 ft (3.4 m). The Minister of Public Works was able to travel by train from Hikutaia to Thames in July 1897.

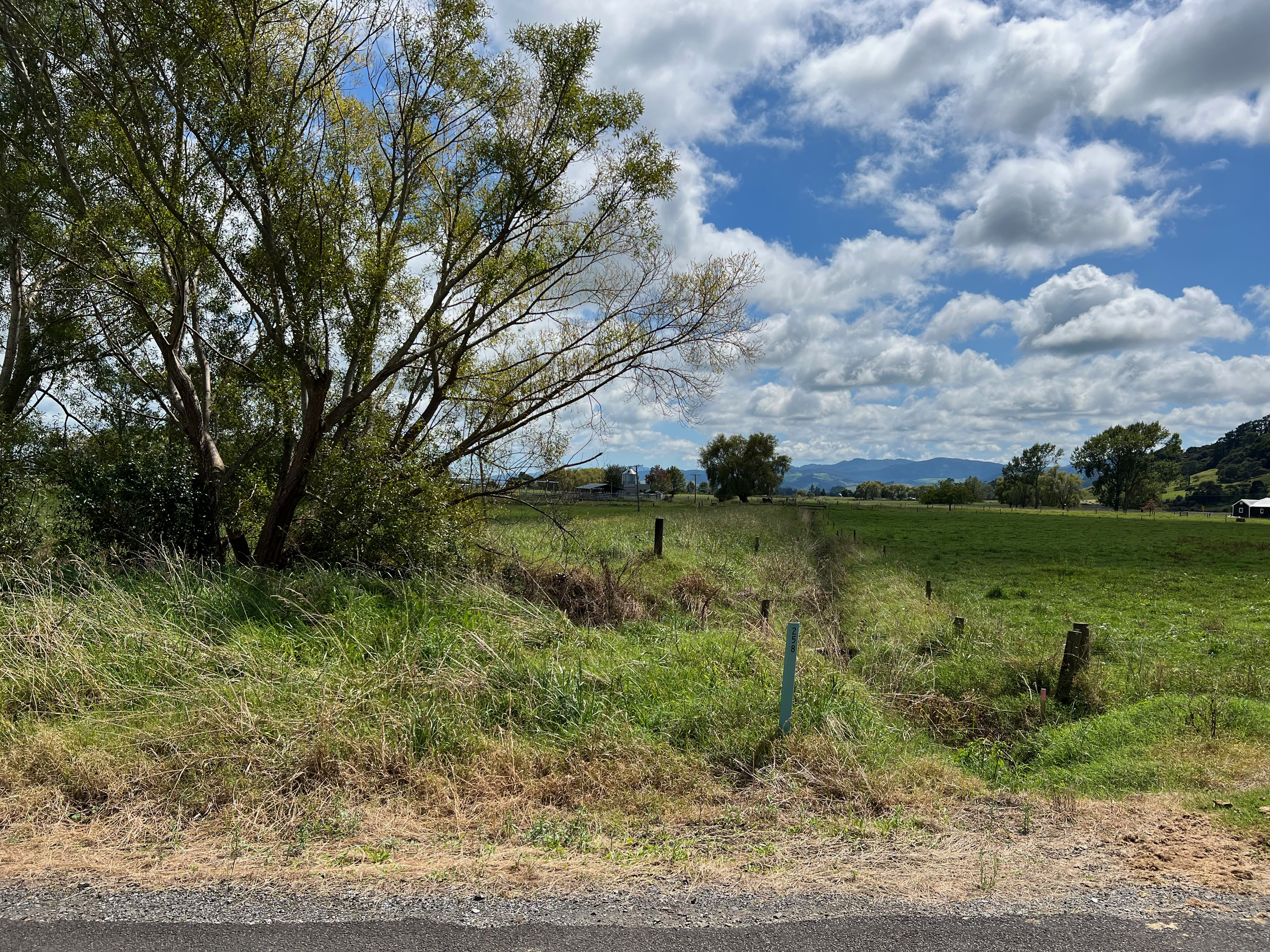
Hikutaia station site in 2023

The Thames to Paeroa section of the line opened on Monday, 19 December 1898, with Hikutaia as a flag station. It had a partly built 6th class station (a shelter shed), 200 ft (61 m) x 12 ft (3.7 m) passenger platform, 20 ft (6.1 m) x 30 ft (9.1 m) goods shed with verandah, loading bank, cattle and sheep yards. A year later there were also urinals and a passing loop for 50 wagons. In 1906 the siding was extended, but goods were being stolen, as the goods shed wasn't locked and the station was unstaffed. Security improved in 1914, when a tablet porter was appointed and lighting was added in 1915. Signals were installed in 1916 and 1919. In 1920 it was said the station was sometimes beyond its capacity and improvements were needed.

As government gave support to roads and cut railway spending, decline started, tablet working ending in 1930, with only 3 mixed trains a day each way between Paeroa and Thames, the porter moved to Auckland, the tablet equipment to Mangapehi and passenger trains withdrawn on 28 March 1951. The crossing loop was reduced to 37 wagons in 1958, the platform was removed in September 1959 and the privy and urinal in November 1959. In the 1960s the cheese factory at Wharepoa started sending its cheese from Hikutaia, rather than Wharepoa Road. By 1965 the main traffic was coal to New Zealand Co-operative Dairy Company and produce from it. From 17 July 1966 only traffic in wagon loads was handled and the station building and goods shed were sold on 19 April 1967 and the 2 railway houses in 1969. The stock yards were unused in 1971 and closed in March 1972, when they too were sold. The crossing loop was out of use by 1974 and removed in January 1976, though another record says it was still in place in 1981. By 1980, only 982 tonnes were carried, all of it lime and fertiliser. On Sunday, 26 April 1981 Hikutaia closed to all traffic. However, in July 1982, it re-opened for maintenance trains. June 28, 1991, was the last day of commercial traffic on the Thames branch and the line officially closed on March 29, 1995. It is now used by the Hauraki Rail Trail.

Preceding station	Historical railways	Following station
Komata North; Line closed, station closed 4.88 km (3.03 mi)	Thames Branch; New Zealand Railways Department	Wharepoa Road; Line closed, station closed 1.69 km (1.05 mi)
