= Tirohia =

Coordinates: 37°26′S 175°39′E

Tirohia is a rural community in the Hauraki District and Waikato region of New Zealand's North Island. It was one of the main areas used by Ngāti Hako, including Te Rae o te Papa pā. A bridge was built over the Waihou River in 1919.

== Education ==
Tirohia School is a co-educational state primary school, with a roll of 51 as of November 2024. The school was built for 45 pupils in 1921 and opened in 1922.

== Quarry and landfill ==
Andesite aggregate from Tirohia was barged from Kopu to Auckland. The quarry began in 1912, when the Tirohia Quarry Company laid a private siding giving access to their horse drawn 2ft 10inch-gauge tramway, via a loading bank into rail wagons. The quarry has been used for landfill since 2001, though a proposed extension was rejected in 2021. Gas from the landfill is used to generate electricity.

== Railway station ==
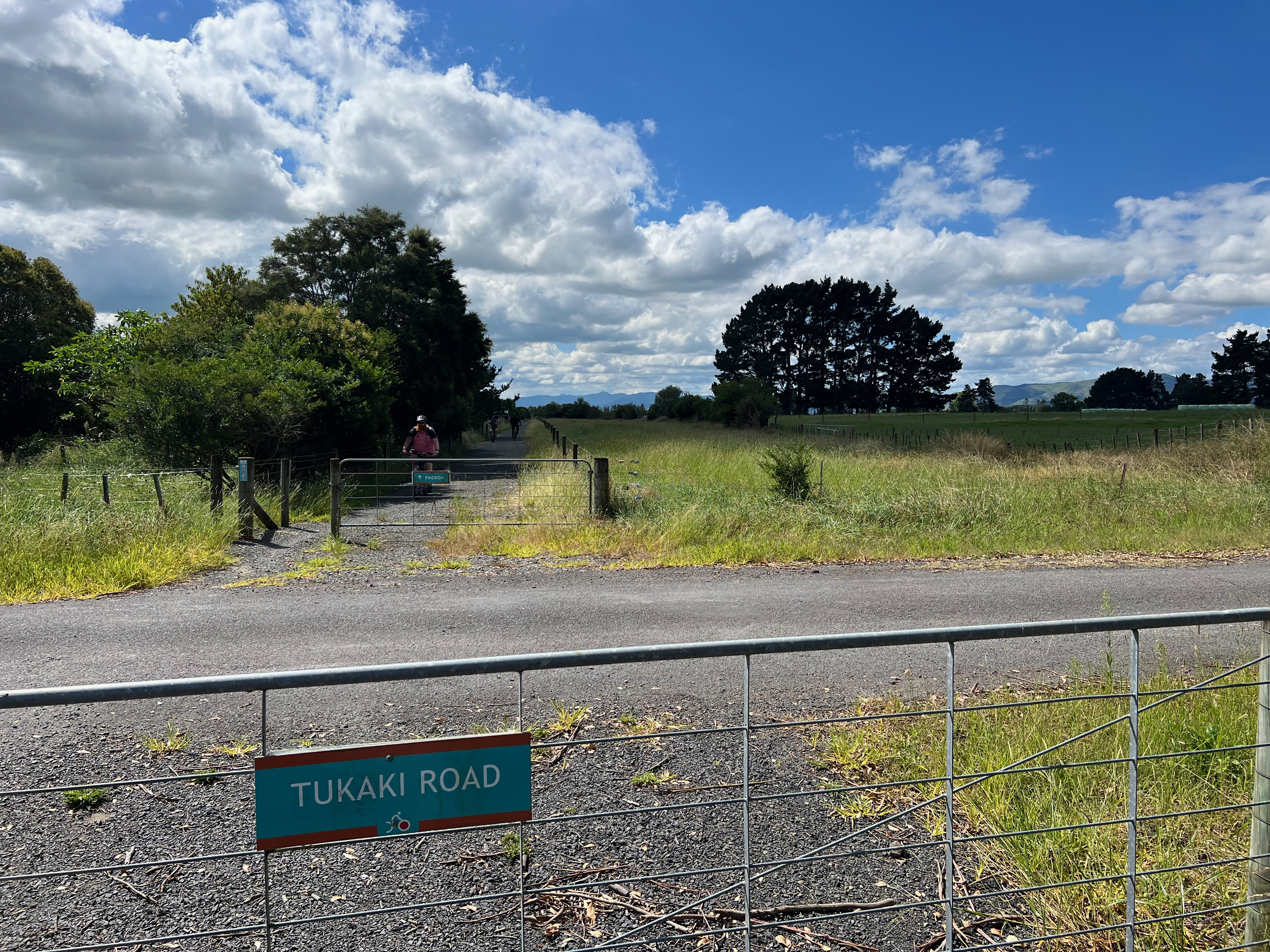
Tirohia station site on Tukaki Road

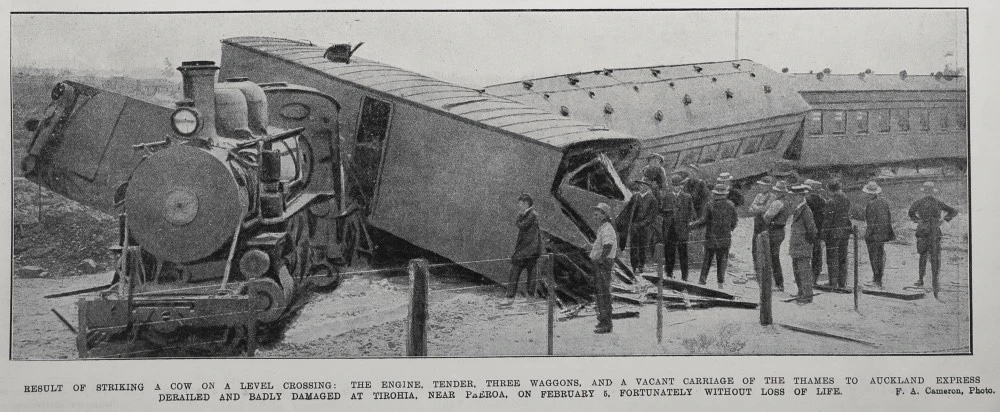
1915 crash at Cadman Rd, Tirohia

The Thames Branch Te Aroha to Paeroa section opened through Tirohia on 20 December 1895. A flag station opened for passengers on 1 November 1899. In the months prior to opening the names Te Rae-o-te Papa and Okahukura had also been used. Initially there was only an earth platform, but, in November 1902, a shelter shed was added for £17 12s 7d. In 1904 and 1913 there were requests to move the station north to Cadman Road. As the station was used by quarry workers it wasn't moved. In 1915 a train was derailed by cattle at Cadman Road, but no passengers were injured. From November 1926 Tirohia handled general goods traffic, with a 32-wagon siding, loading bank, privy and urinal. In July 1930 a 20 ft (6.1 m) x 12 ft (3.7 m) goods shed was moved from Pukekohe. In May 1975 the public siding was removed and in December 1977 the goods shed was sold.

By 1948 the quarry tramway had been replaced by a road, so when in 1955 railway ballast was to be loaded from the quarry, a new loading bank was needed on the platform and the station closed to passengers, though another source says it closed to passengers on 11 September 1967. In March 1956 a new 83 wagon siding and loading bank were ready. On 27 April 1980 Tirohia closed to public traffic but the siding was retained for ballast. When the Thames branch closed on 29 March 1995 Tirohia had only overgrown main and ballast lines. The line is now used by the Hauraki Rail Trail.

From 15 November 1942 to 28 February 1968 Associated Motorists Petrol Co Ltd (later Europa) carried petrol from Auckland to Tirohia, using a pipe near the goods shed.

Preceding station	Historical railways	Following station
Waitoki; Line closed, station closed 3 mi 14 ch (5.1 km)	Thames Branch; New Zealand Railways Department	Paeroa; Line closed, station closed 8.86 km (5.51 mi), 9.84 km (6.11 mi) from 1925
