= Puriri (disambiguation) =

Pūriri is an evergreen tree endemic to New Zealand.

Puriri or Pūriri may also refer to:

- Puriri, New Zealand, a small locality on the Hauraki Plains
- HMNZS Puriri, boat of the Royal New Zealand Navy
- Pūriri moth (Aenetus virescens)
- Puriri River, a river of the Waikato Region
