= Matatoki =

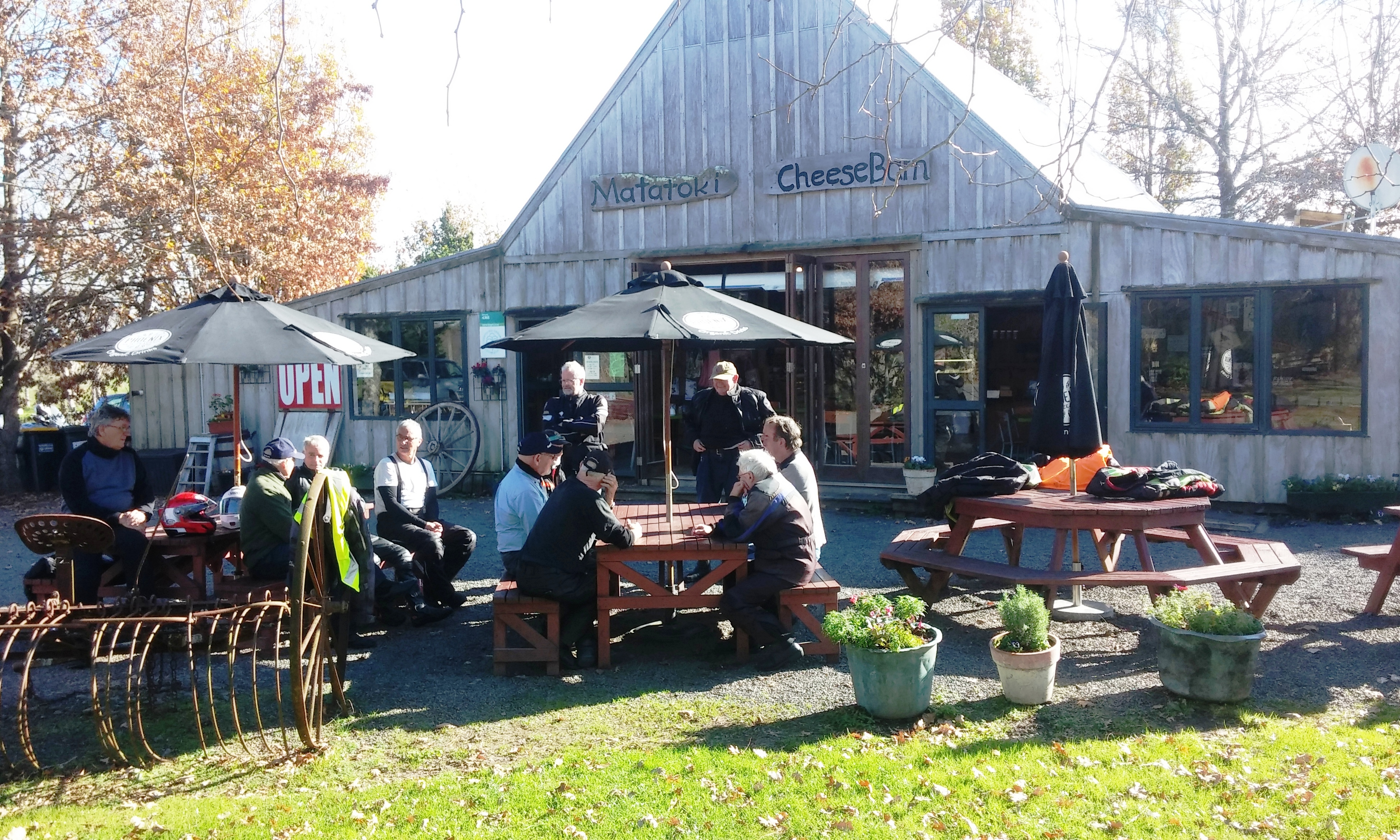
- Lunch at the Matatoki Cheese Barn
- Interactive map of Matatoki
- Coordinates: 37°12′28″S 175°36′24″E
- Country: New Zealand
- Region: Waikato
- District: Thames-Coromandel District
- Ward: Thames ward
- Community Board: Thames Community
- Electorates: Coromandel; Hauraki-Waikato (Maori)

Government
  - Council: Thames-Coromandel District Council
  - Regional council: Waikato Regional Council
  - Mayor of Thames-Coromandel: Peter Revell
  - Coromandel MP: Scott Simpson
  - Hauraki-Waikato MP: Hana-Rawhiti Maipi-Clarke

Matatoki is a locality on the Hauraki Plains of New Zealand. It lies on State Highway 26, south east of Thames and north of Paeroa. The Matatoki Stream runs from the Coromandel Range through the area to join the Waihou River.

The Kopu sawmill, a few kilometres north of Matatoki, closed at the end of June 2008, with the loss of 145 jobs.

== History ==
The eastern bank of the Waihou River near Matatoki was the location for many Hauraki Māori pā, such as Oruarangi pā and Paterangi pā, which were likely first settled in the 1300s. Between the 1930s and 1960s, Oruarangi pā was an important archaeological site for Classic period Māori artifacts.

== Demographics ==
Matatoki-Pūriri statistical area also includes Puriri. It covers 161.07 km^{2} (62.19 sq mi) and had an estimated population of 1,210 as of June 2025, with a population density of 8 people per km^{2}.

Historical population for Matatoki-Pūriri
Year	Pop.	±% p.a.
2006	1,062	—
2013	1,002	−0.83%
2018	1,059	+1.11%
2023	1,176	+2.12%

Matatoki-Pūriri had a population of 1,176 in the 2023 New Zealand census, an increase of 117 people (11.0%) since the 2018 census, and an increase of 174 people (17.4%) since the 2013 census. There were 600 males, 573 females and 3 people of other genders in 405 dwellings. 2.3% of people identified as LGBTIQ+. The median age was 44.4 years (compared with 38.1 years nationally). There were 231 people (19.6%) aged under 15 years, 165 (14.0%) aged 15 to 29, 570 (48.5%) aged 30 to 64, and 210 (17.9%) aged 65 or older.

People could identify as more than one ethnicity. The results were 93.4% European (Pākehā); 19.9% Māori; 2.0% Pasifika; 2.0% Asian; 0.3% Middle Eastern, Latin American and African New Zealanders (MELAA); and 1.5% other, which includes people giving their ethnicity as "New Zealander". English was spoken by 97.4%, Māori language by 2.8%, and other languages by 5.1%. No language could be spoken by 2.0% (e.g. too young to talk). New Zealand Sign Language was known by 0.5%. The percentage of people born overseas was 11.0, compared with 28.8% nationally.

Religious affiliations were 21.9% Christian, 0.8% Hindu, 0.5% Māori religious beliefs, 0.3% Buddhist, 0.8% New Age, and 0.5% other religions. People who answered that they had no religion were 67.1%, and 8.4% of people did not answer the census question.

Of those at least 15 years old, 117 (12.4%) people had a bachelor's or higher degree, 561 (59.4%) had a post-high school certificate or diploma, and 267 (28.3%) people exclusively held high school qualifications. The median income was $40,800, compared with $41,500 nationally. 78 people (8.3%) earned over $100,000 compared to 12.1% nationally. The employment status of those at least 15 was that 504 (53.3%) people were employed full-time, 153 (16.2%) were part-time, and 21 (2.2%) were unemployed.

== Education ==
Matatoki School is a coeducational full primary school (years 1–8) with a roll of 82 as of July 2026. The school opened in 1920.

== Railway station ==
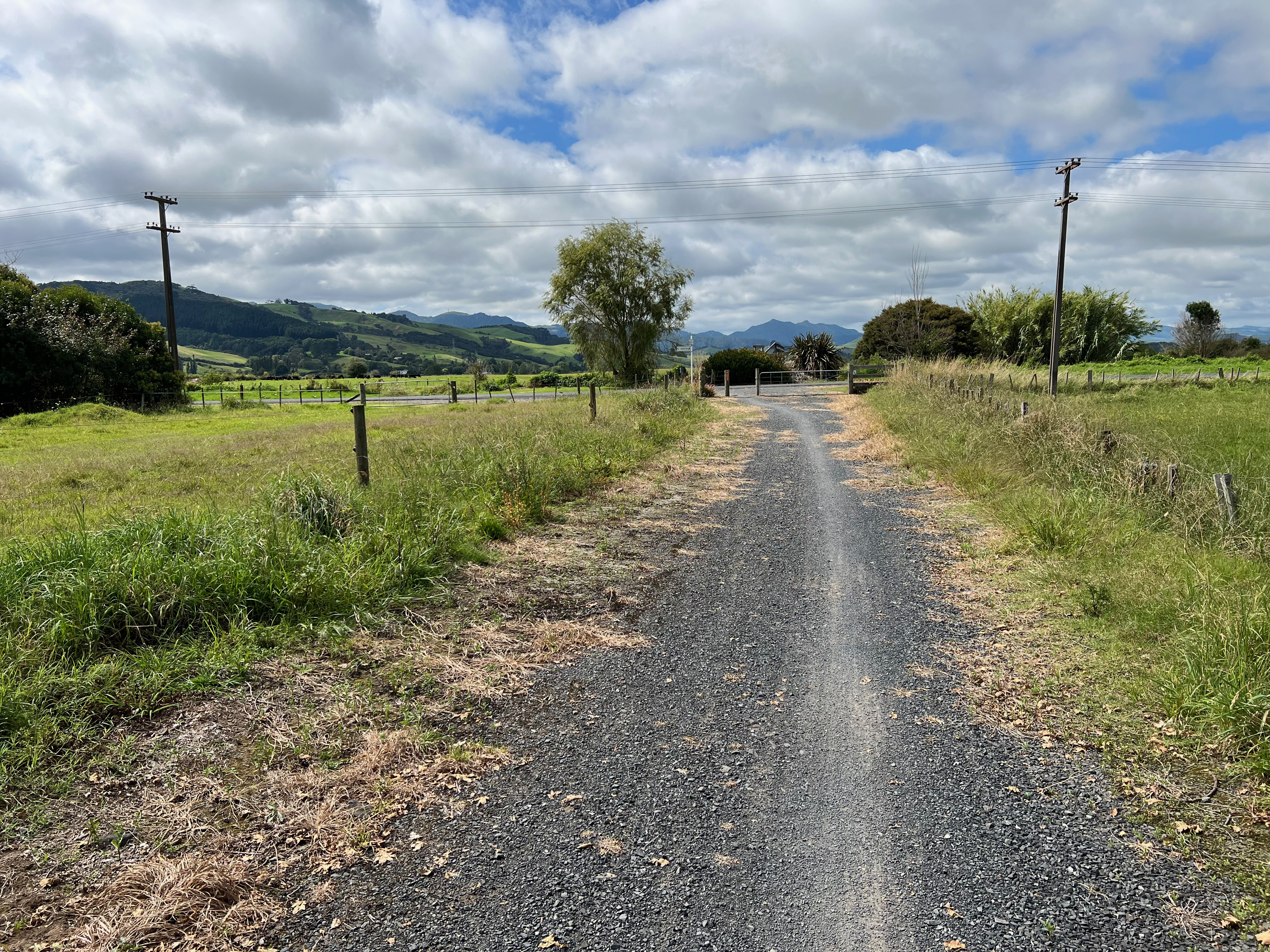
Matatoki station site, now part of the Hauraki Rail Trail, in 2023

Matatoki had a railway station, just south of the village (37°12′33″S 175°36′11″E), from 1898 to 1995 on the Thames Branch. Larkins and O'Brien built the Kopu to Hikutaia section from August 1885 for £10,879, had made good progress by January 1886 and completed that section through Matatoki in May 1887. Heath and Irwin started building the Hikutaia to Paeroa section, to the south, in January 1887. Work on the Paeroa to Te Aroha section began in 1892, but in 1895 it was said, "a Parliamentary faction stopped the workers in their work". Work on the bridges resumed in 1897. The Minister of Public Works was able to travel by train from Hikutaia, through Matatoki, to Thames in July 1897.

The Thames to Paeroa section of the line opened on Monday, 19 December 1898, with Matatoki as a flag station. It had a partly built 6th class station (a shelter shed), 100 ft (30 m) x 12 ft (3.7 m) platform and a loading bank. A year later there was also a passing loop for 35 wagons and a siding. By 1966 there was also a low-level loading bank for Matatoki Quarries to load crushed metal.

Passenger trains were withdrawn on 28 March 1951 and freight on 22 February 1971, though Matatoki reopened for freight on 28 February 1974, closed again on 20 July 1980 and re-opened again on 30 November 1984, until June 28, 1991, the last day of commercial traffic on the Thames branch, which officially closed on March 29, 1995. It is now used by the Hauraki Rail Trail.

Preceding station	Historical railways	Following station
Puriri; Line closed, station closed 3.66 km (2.27 mi)	Thames Branch; New Zealand Railways Department	Kopu; Line closed, station closed 4.05 km (2.52 mi)
