= NZR RM class (Sentinel-Cammell) =

Railcar in New Zealand

NZ RM class Sentinel-Cammell
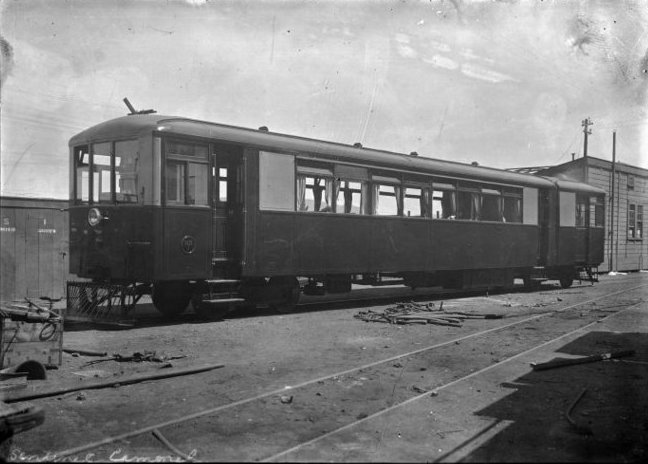
Type and origin
- Power type: Steam railcar (Passenger capacity: 48)
- Builder: Sentinel Waggon Works
- Build date: 1925
Specifications
- Gauge: 3 ft 6 in (1,067 mm)
- Loco weight: 20 tons
- Fuel type: Coal
- Boiler pressure: 275 psi (1,896 kPa)
Performance figures
- Maximum speed: 45 mph (72 km/h)
Career
- Operators: New Zealand Railways
- Number in class: 1
- Locale: Thames Branch
- Withdrawn: 7 May 1931
- Disposition: Scrapped

The NZR RM class Sentinel-Cammell was a steam-powered railcar operated by the New Zealand Railways Department (NZR). It was the only one of its type to operate in New Zealand, and one of only two steam railcars trialled in the country; the other was the Clayton steam railcar.

== Overview ==
In the early 20th century, NZR began experiments with railcars as an option to replace unprofitable regional locomotive-hauled carriage expresses and to provide efficient passenger service on rural branch lines that were served solely by slow mixed trains that carried both goods and passengers. Such mixed trains had slow schedules as they had to load and unload freight regularly, making their stops longer than passenger service would normally require. In 1925, a steam railcar was ordered from the Sentinel Waggon Works of Shrewsbury and Metro-Cammell of Birmingham, and when it entered revenue service, it was the first railcar to do so in the Auckland Region. It subsequently operated outside this region.

== In service ==
The railcar was not fast enough for the Melling Branch, so it was assigned to run a feeder service for the Night Limited express that ran between Wellington and Auckland. The feeder service operated from Thames along the Thames Branch and met the express at Hamilton (Frankton Junction) before returning to Thames. This service was not the sole domain of the Sentinel-Cammell steam railcar, it was sometimes operated by a carriage train hauled by steam locomotives such as the U^{D} class. In 1928 it survived a collision with cows.

== Withdrawal ==
The Sentinel-Cammell steam railcar did not prove popular with passengers or crews and was not expanded into a full fleet. After a few years of service, it was quietly withdrawn and scrapped in 1931.
