= Thames Branch =

Railway line in New Zealand

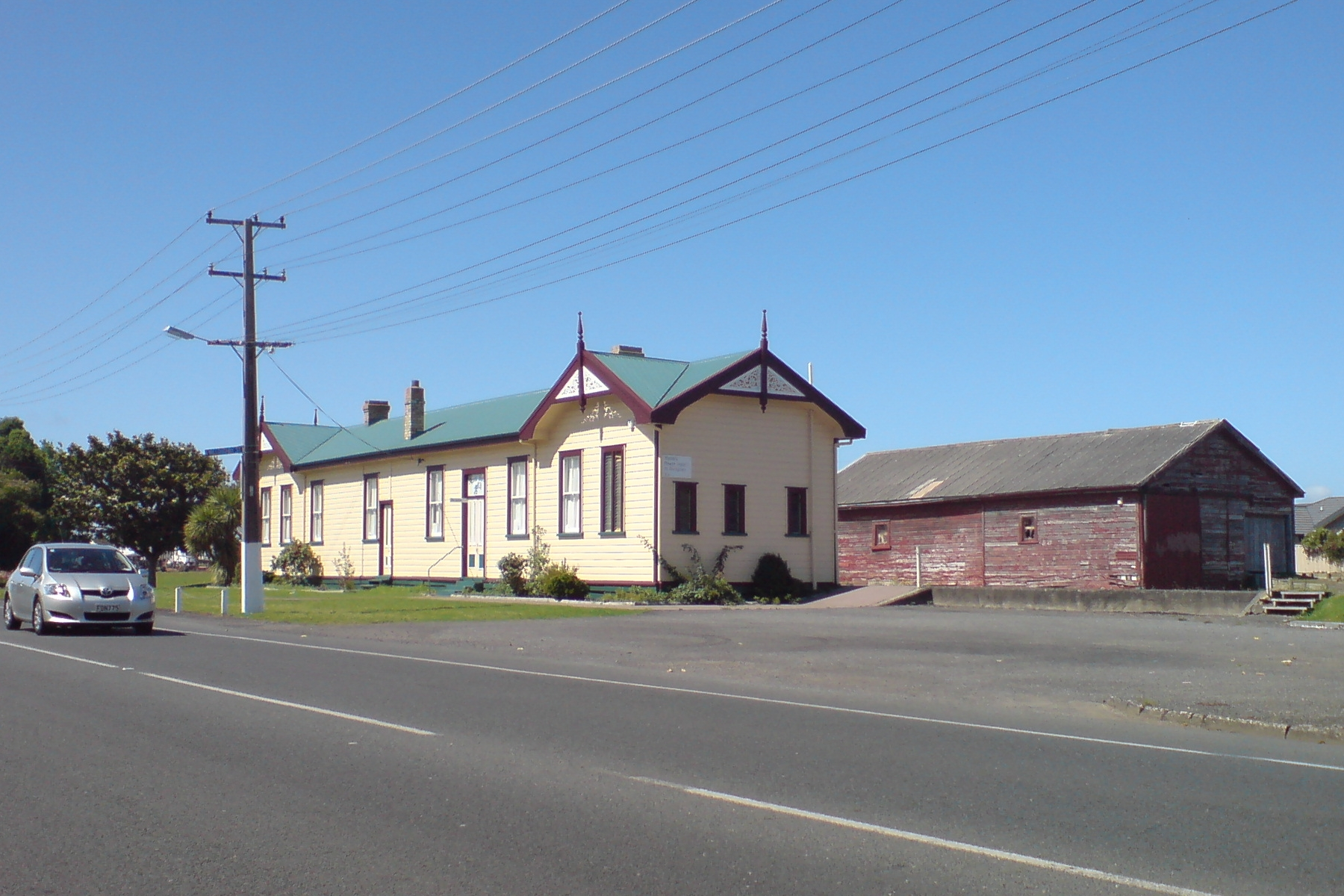
- The former station in Thames.

Overview
- Other name: Waitoa Branch
- Status: Closed Waitoa - Thames; Open Morrinsville - Waitoa
- Owner: New Zealand Railways Corporation (land); KiwiRail (track)
- Locale: Waikato, New Zealand
- Termini: Morrinsville; Thames

Service
- Type: Heavy Rail
- System: New Zealand Government Railways (NZGR)
- Operator(s): KiwiRail (as far as Waitoa dairy factory)
- Rolling stock: None

History
- Opened: 19 December 1898 (Hamilton - Thames)
- Junction moved to Paeroa: November 1905
- Junction moved to Morrinsville: 12 September 1978
- Closed beyond Waitoa: 31 May 1995

Technical
- Line length: 74.07 km (46.02 mi) Morrinsville - Thames; 11 km (6.8 mi) Open
- Number of tracks: Single
- Character: Rural
- Track gauge: 1,067 mm (3 ft 6 in)

Map

The Thames Branch railway line connected Thames, New Zealand, with Hamilton and was originally part of the East Coast Main Trunk railway. Part of the line between Morrinsville and Waitoa remains open and is in use as the Waitoa Branch line, connecting to the Fonterra Dairy Factory at Waitoa.

== History ==
The discovery of gold in the Thames area in 1852 provided the impetus for building a railway line from Auckland to Thames. In 1873 surveying was carried out for the Thames to Waikato line. This surveying was disrupted by natives from Ohinemuri. Despite the opposition the surveyor wrote that most natives supported the railway line. Thames to serve the gold mining industry. Surveys were completed in 1878, despite opposition from local Maori, putting the cost of the 54 km line at £178,000. The 32 mi (51 km) Thames-Te Aroha section had cost £159,340 (about $30m in 2018 values) when opened. Premier Sir George Grey turned the first sod of the line at Thames on 21 December 1878, but 18 months later work from Thames was stopped by the 1880 Royal Commission ordered by Grey's successor. The track bed had been built as far as Kopu by 1884, employing about 30 men.

Construction of the section from Hamilton continued, albeit slowly. The line crossed the Waikato River and was opened from Morrinsville to Te Aroha on 1 March 1886, to Paeroa on 20 December 1895, and finally to Thames on 19 December 1898. The Minister of Railways, Alfred Cadman, drove the first train into Thames, headed by an F class locomotive.

One of the lines first major traffic sources was A & G Price of Thames, who started producing locomotives for NZGR from 1904.

Following the completion of the North Island Main Trunk in 1908, the government began planning the East Coast Main Trunk in 1909, eventually to connect to Gisborne. Work began in 1911 on a link from Paeroa through the Karangahake Gorge to Waihi. From this stage the Thames Branch was defined as Paeroa to Thames, with the Morrinsville - Paeroa section being designated as part of the East Coast Main Trunk.

In 1928 the passenger service was being provided by a steam railcar. Station closed to passengers on 28 March 1951. Freight was declining by 1930, leading to the loss of the porter at Puriri.

The opening of the Kaimai Tunnel in 1978 and the closure of the Paeroa - Katikati section of the East Coast Main Trunk led to the re-designation of the Morrinsville - Thames section as the Thames Branch.

Scheduled trains to Thames ceased in 1985. The last service on the line was on 28 June 1991, following the reduction in output from the Toyota New Zealand assembly plant at Thames resulting in loss of traffic. While New Zealand Rail did attempt to win this traffic back, the branch was officially closed on 31 May 1995. The Toyota plant closed for vehicle assembly in 1997 and 60 kilometres (37 mi) of track was then lifted between Thames and the dairy factory at Waitoa. In 2004 the section of the line as far as Waitoa, which was still in place, was re-opened for dairy traffic, as part of Fonterra's policy of reviewing its transport links.

The Thames Railway Station building of 1898 survives as it was listed by NZHPT Category II in 1982. It is a standard Vintage station, with gables, finials and scalloped bargeboards.

== Services ==
Currently, services to Waitoa consist of scheduled weekday shunts to Hamilton and Morrinsville carrying dairy products, usually powered by a DSJ class shunting locomotive, or by a DC class mainline locomotive when higher tonnages are being moved.

== Stations ==
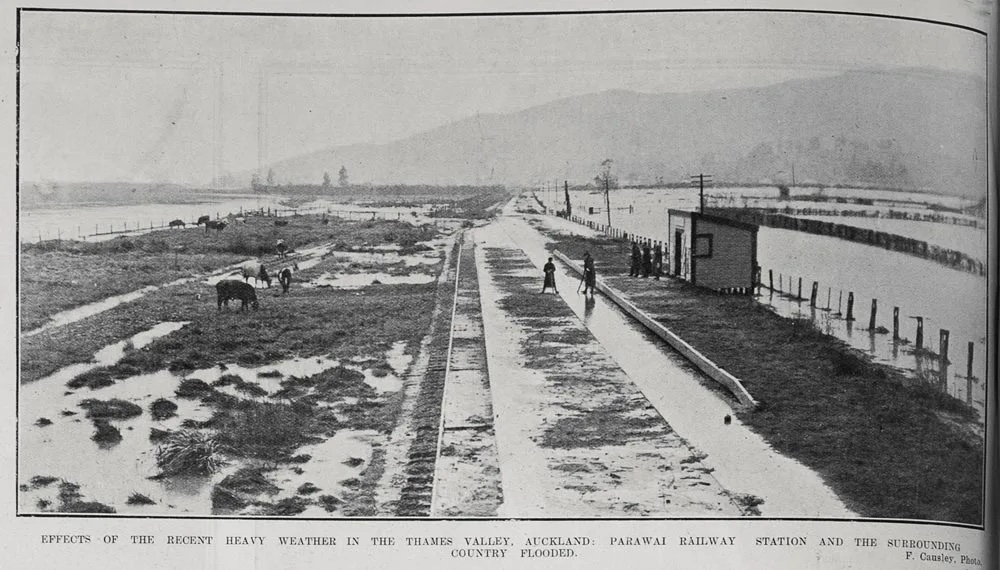
Parawai railway station in flood, in August 1907

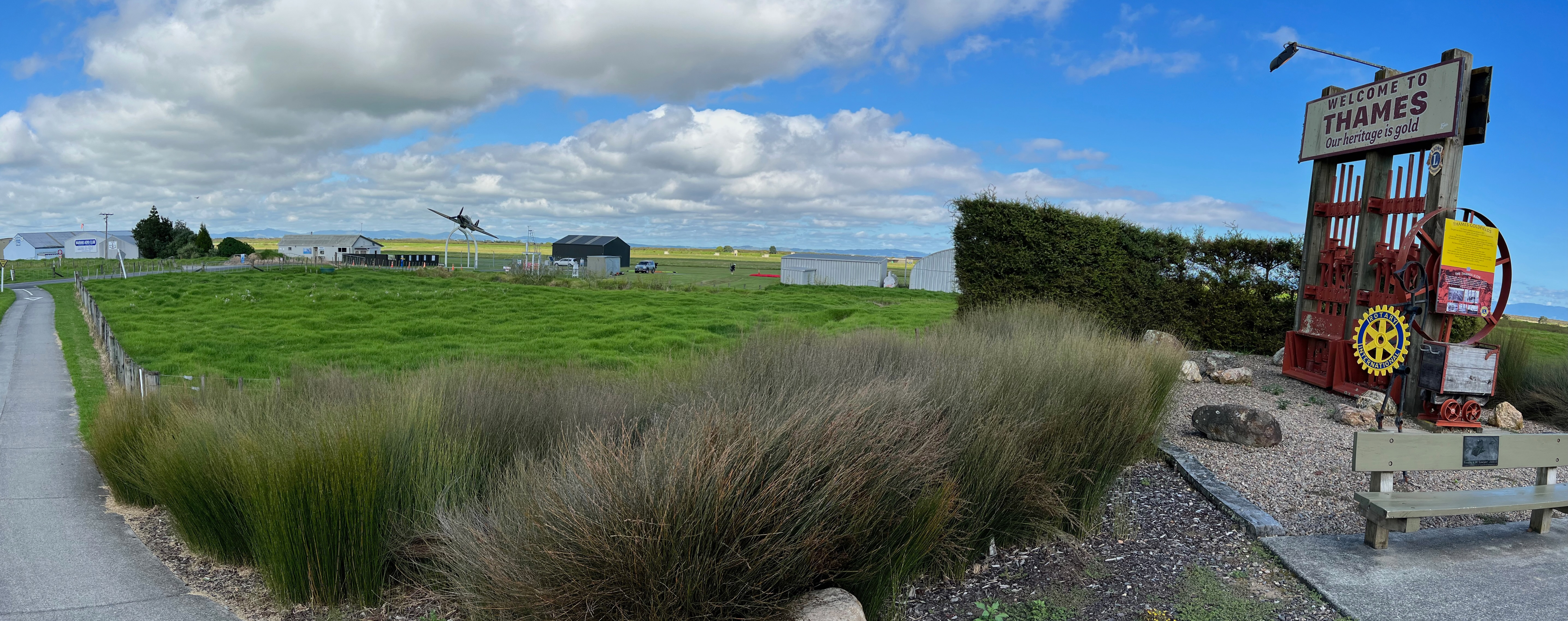
Parawai railway station site and Thames airport in 2023

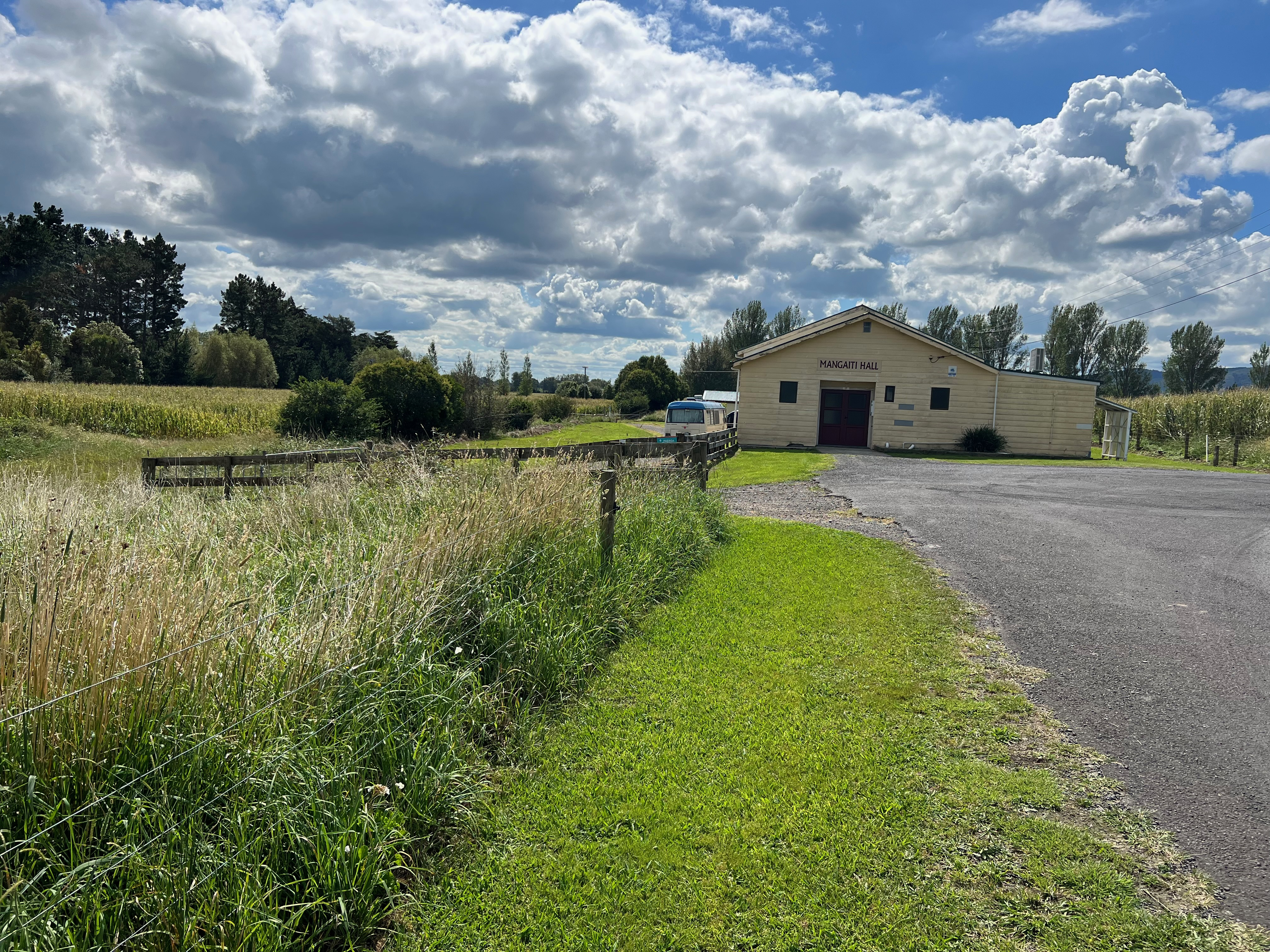
Mangaiti railway station site in 2023

Stations were at Thames North (formerly known as Grahamstown, then Thames), Thames (Shortland until 1 October 1915 and Thames South until 28 April 1929), Parawai, Kopu, Matatoki, Puriri, Omahu, Wharepoa Rd, Hikutaia, Komata North, Paeroa (junction for Tauranga), Tirohia, Waitoki, Mangaiti, Tui Pa, Te Aroha, Herriesville, Waihou, Waitoa (current terminus), Tatuanui, Piako and the present junction with the ECMT at Morrinsville.

== Cycleway ==
Most of the former rail alignment is now part of the Hauraki Rail Trail of the New Zealand Cycle Trail network, with the local councils in 2011 securing a 20-year lease, though the option of prior termination remains should KiwiRail intend to relay the railway to run trains along the corridor again.

== See also ==
- East Coast Main Trunk
- Cambridge Branch
- Glen Afton Branch
- Glen Massey Line'
- Kimihia Branch
- Kinleith Branch
- Rotorua Branch
