= Komata River =

Coordinates: 37.345880°S 175.647780°E

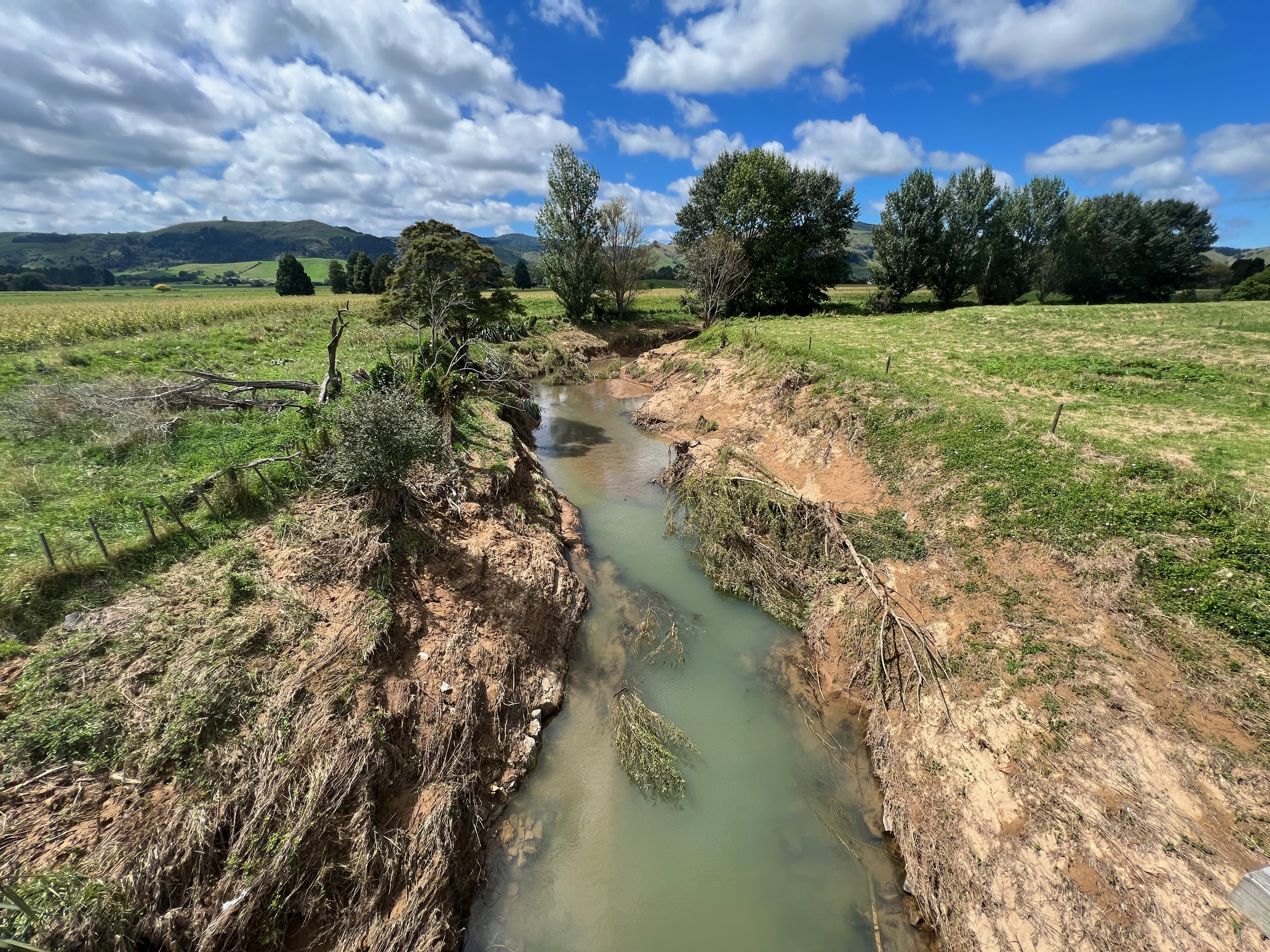
- Komata River looking east from Hauraki Rail Trail after floods in 2023

Location
- Country: New Zealand

Physical characteristics
- Source
  - location: Coromandel Range
- Mouth
  - location: Waihou River
- Length: 11 km (6.8 mi)

The Komata River is a river of New Zealand's North Island. It flows west from the Coromandel Range, reaching the Waihou River just north of Paeroa.

== See also ==
- List of rivers of New Zealand
