= Puriri River =

Coordinates: 37.236899°S 175.604897°E

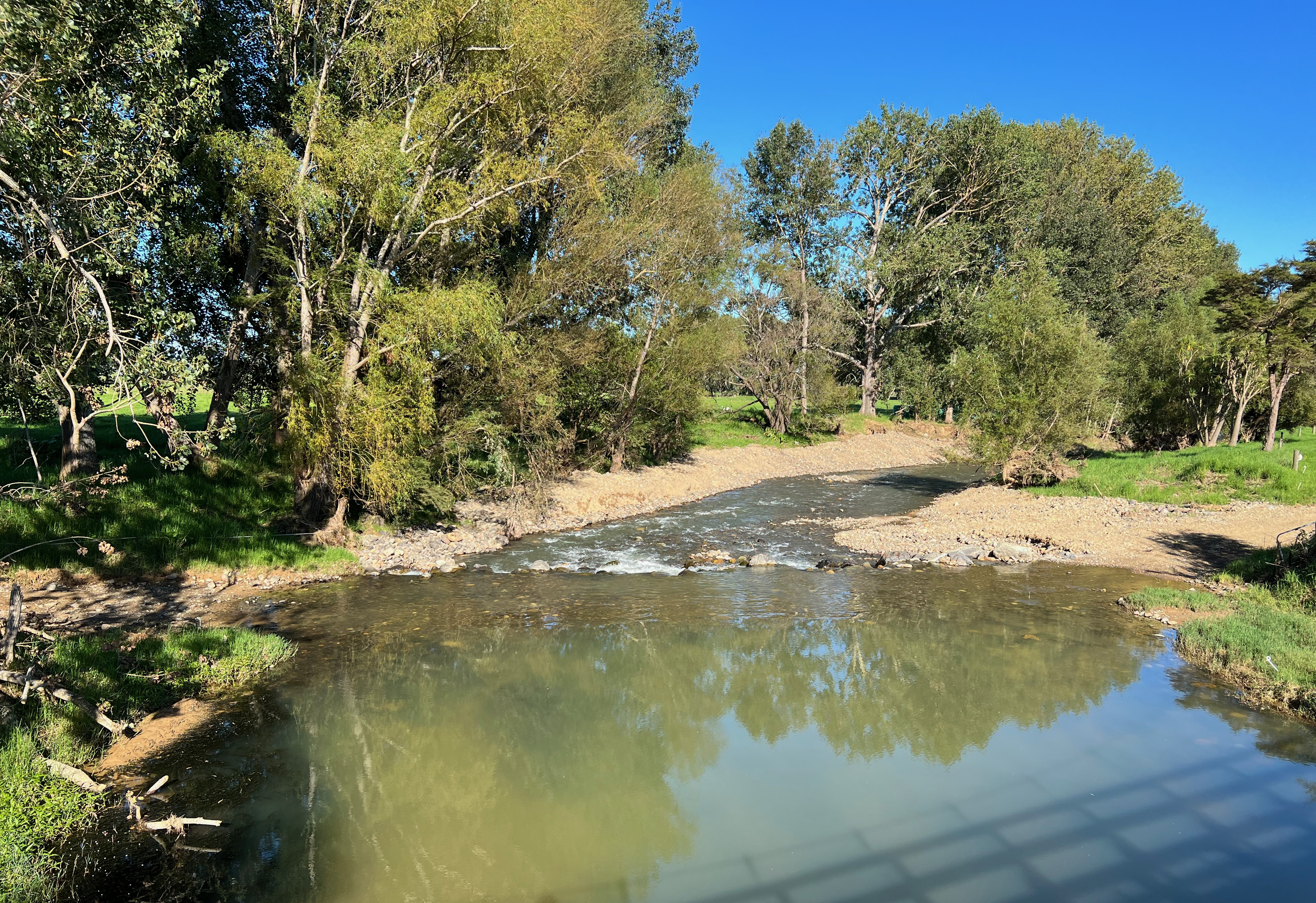
- Puriri River from Hauraki Rail Trail

Location
- Country: New Zealand

Physical characteristics
- Source
  - location: Coromandel Range
  - elevation: 246 m (807 ft)
- Mouth
  - location: Waihou River
  - elevation: 2 m (6 ft 7 in)
- Length: 10 km (6.2 mi)
- Basin size: 39.35 km^{2} (15.19 sq mi)

The Puriri River is a river of the Waikato Region of New Zealand's North Island. It flows west close to the point where the Coromandel Peninsula joins the rest of the North Island, reaching the Waihou River 3 kilometres (2 mi) east of Turua.

73% of the catchment is in forest and 27% in pasture. The main tributaries are Apakura, Kotorepupuai and Matangiharara streams. Average channel gradients are 5% to 7%.

The Apakura Stream rises on Pakirarahi, which is 787 metres (2,582 ft) high. Macroinvertebrate levels in the stream indicate a good water quality. The stream is used for water supply.

Radiocarbon dating of shell middens beside the river indicates the earliest settlement along the river was about 1674.

== See also ==
- Puriri, New Zealand
- List of rivers of New Zealand
