= Thames railway station =

Defunct railway station in New Zealand

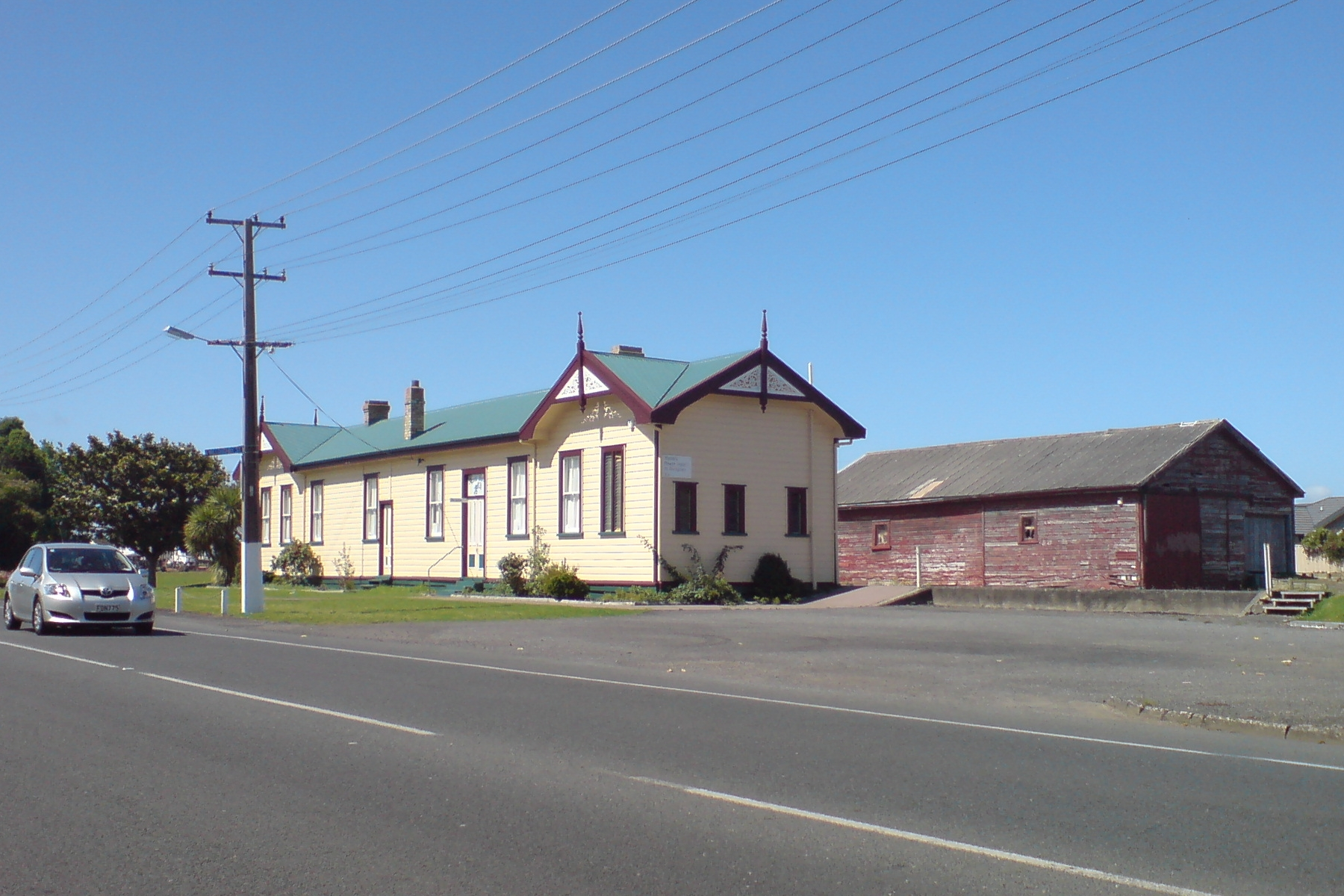
- Former Thames railway station building

General information
- Location: 111 Queen Street, Thames; New Zealand
- Coordinates: 37°8′37.82″S 175°32′34.53″E
- Line: Thames Branch

Other information
- Classification: RHTNZ Category B building

History
- Opened: 19 December 1898
- Closed: 28 June 1991
Location

The Thames railway station is a former railway station in Thames, New Zealand on the former Thames Branch from Morrinsville to Thames.

The station opened on 19 December 1898 with the opening of the branch line. Passenger service ceased from 28 March 1951. There were also station buildings at Thames North and Thames South.

The branch was closed (apart from a section) on 28 June 1991, and goods service ceased. However the station building remained as it was listed by NZHPT Category II in 1982. It is a standard Vintage station, with gables, finials and scalloped bargeboards.

Work on the proposed Paeroa–Pokeno Line commenced in the 1930s, but little was done and the proposal was abandoned. The line was to be the first part of the East Coast Main Trunk railway.
