= Puriri, New Zealand =

Puriri
- Interactive map of Puriri
- Coordinates: 37°13′47″S 175°38′14″E
- Country: New Zealand
- Region: Waikato
- District: Thames-Coromandel District
- Ward: Thames ward
- Community Board: Thames Community
- Electorates: Coromandel; Hauraki-Waikato (Māori)

Government
  - Council: Thames-Coromandel District Council
  - Regional council: Waikato Regional Council
  - Mayor of Thames-Coromandel: Peter Revell
  - Coromandel MP: Scott Simpson
  - Hauraki-Waikato MP: Hana-Rawhiti Maipi-Clarke

Area
  - Total: 1.00 km^{2} (0.39 sq mi)

Population (June 2025)
  - Total: 250
  - Density: 250/km^{2} (650/sq mi)

Puriri is a small locality on the Hauraki Plains of New Zealand. It lies approximately 14 km south-east of Thames, New Zealand.

Puriri was originally a Ngāti Maru settlement, which the Rev. Henry Williams visited in October 1833, when the Church Missionary Society (CMS) missionaries, William Thomas Fairburn, John Alexander Wilson, John Morgan and James Preece established a mission station in the settlement, In 1835 James Stack was appointed to Puriri. However, the missionaries withdrew from the mission that same year as the result of fighting in the Waikato. Fairburn returned to the Puriri Mission at the end of the fighting. Preece took over the mission in 1834 with the assistance of the Rev. James Hamlin. In 1838 the station was transferred to Parawai (part of the present town of Thames).

In 1868 Puriri was the location for an official goldfield during the Thames-Coromandel gold rush. Puriri railway station was to the west of the village 59.54 km (37.00 mi) from Morrinsville and was open from 1898 to 1951. The former railway is now used by the Hauraki Trail.

== Demographics ==
Puriri is described by Statistics New Zealand as a rural settlement. It covers 1.00 km^{2} (0.39 sq mi) and had an estimated population of 250 as of June 2025, with a population density of 250 people per km^{2}. Puriri is part of the larger Matatoki-Pūriri statistical area.

Historical population
Year	Pop.	±% p.a.
2006	222	—
2013	204	−1.20%
2018	234	+2.78%
2023	252	+1.49%

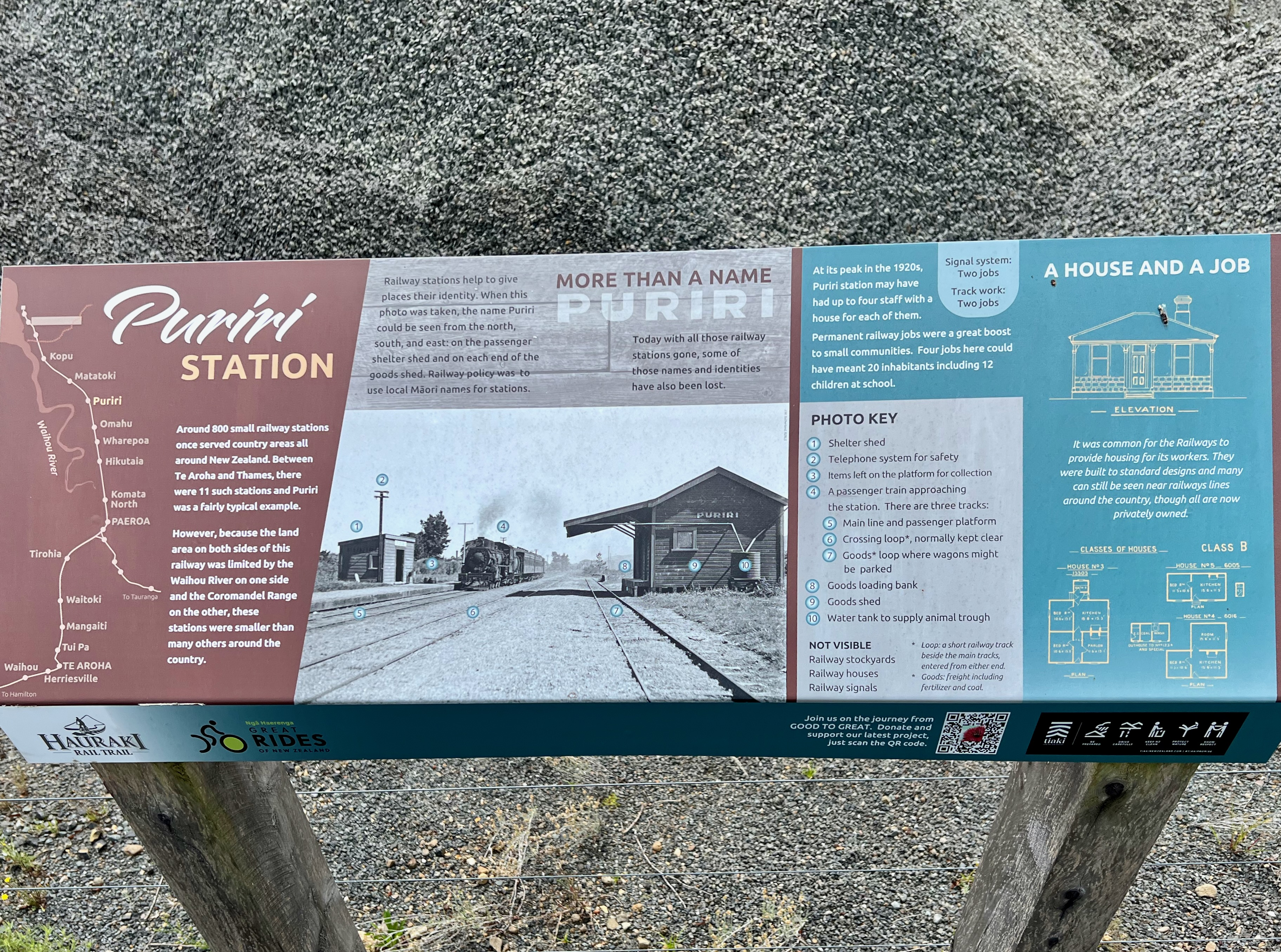
Hauraki Trail information board about Puriri railway station

Puriri had a population of 252 in the 2023 New Zealand census, an increase of 18 people (7.7%) since the 2018 census, and an increase of 48 people (23.5%) since the 2013 census. There were 126 males, 123 females and 3 people of other genders in 87 dwellings. 2.4% of people identified as LGBTIQ+. The median age was 43.4 years (compared with 38.1 years nationally). There were 51 people (20.2%) aged under 15 years, 36 (14.3%) aged 15 to 29, 114 (45.2%) aged 30 to 64, and 54 (21.4%) aged 65 or older.

People could identify as more than one ethnicity. The results were 94.0% European (Pākehā), 19.0% Māori, 2.4% Pasifika, and 1.2% Asian. English was spoken by 97.6%, and other languages by 6.0%. No language could be spoken by 1.2% (e.g. too young to talk). New Zealand Sign Language was known by 1.2%. The percentage of people born overseas was 9.5, compared with 28.8% nationally.

Religious affiliations were 23.8% Christian, and 1.2% New Age. People who answered that they had no religion were 66.7%, and 8.3% of people did not answer the census question.

Of those at least 15 years old, 18 (9.0%) people had a bachelor's or higher degree, 138 (68.7%) had a post-high school certificate or diploma, and 45 (22.4%) people exclusively held high school qualifications. The median income was $40,500, compared with $41,500 nationally. 12 people (6.0%) earned over $100,000 compared to 12.1% nationally. The employment status of those at least 15 was that 111 (55.2%) people were employed full-time, 27 (13.4%) were part-time, and 6 (3.0%) were unemployed.

== Education ==
Puriri School is a coeducational full primary (years 1–8) school with a roll of 23 as of July 2025. The school opened in 1878. There was an earlier school called Puriri School, which flourished in 1837.
