= Hikutaia River =

Coordinates: 37°17′S 175°38′E

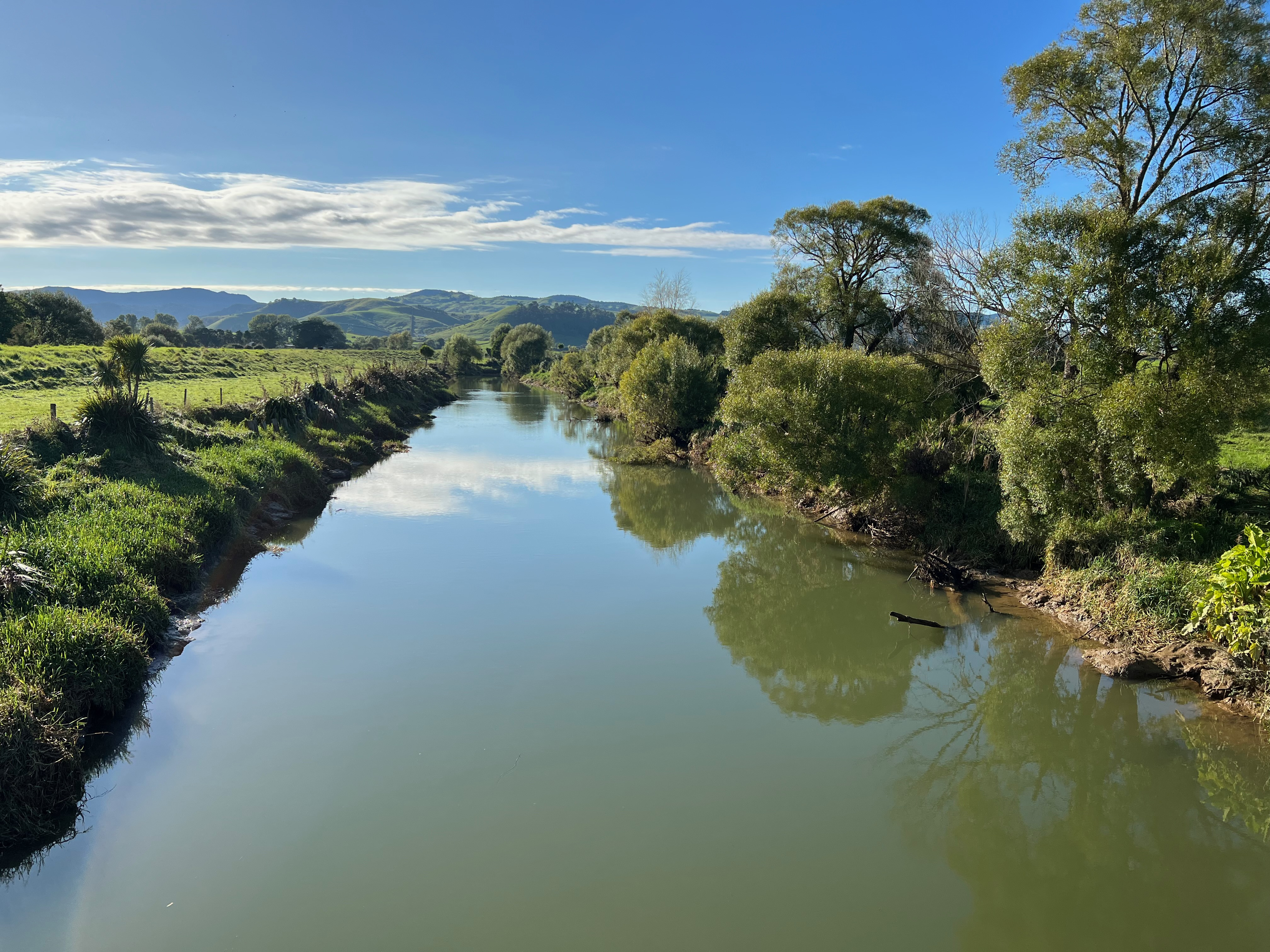
- Hikutaia River at Ferry Road

Location
- Country: New Zealand

Physical characteristics
- Source
  - location: Coromandel Range
  - elevation: 750 m (2,460 ft)
- Mouth
  - location: Waihou River
  - elevation: 2 m (6 ft 7 in)
- Length: 12 km (7.5 mi)
- Basin size: 73 km^{2} (28 sq mi)

The Hikutaia River is a river of New Zealand's North Island. It has its source in several streams which flow west from the Coromandel Range, the longest of which is the Waipaheke Stream. The river generally flows west, reaching its outflow into the Waihou River 10 kilometres (6 mi) north of Paeroa on the edge of the Hauraki Plains.

Water quality is good, except for E. coli and ammoniacal nitrogen.

== See also ==
- List of rivers of New Zealand
