= Kopu Bridge =

Historic Kopu Bridge
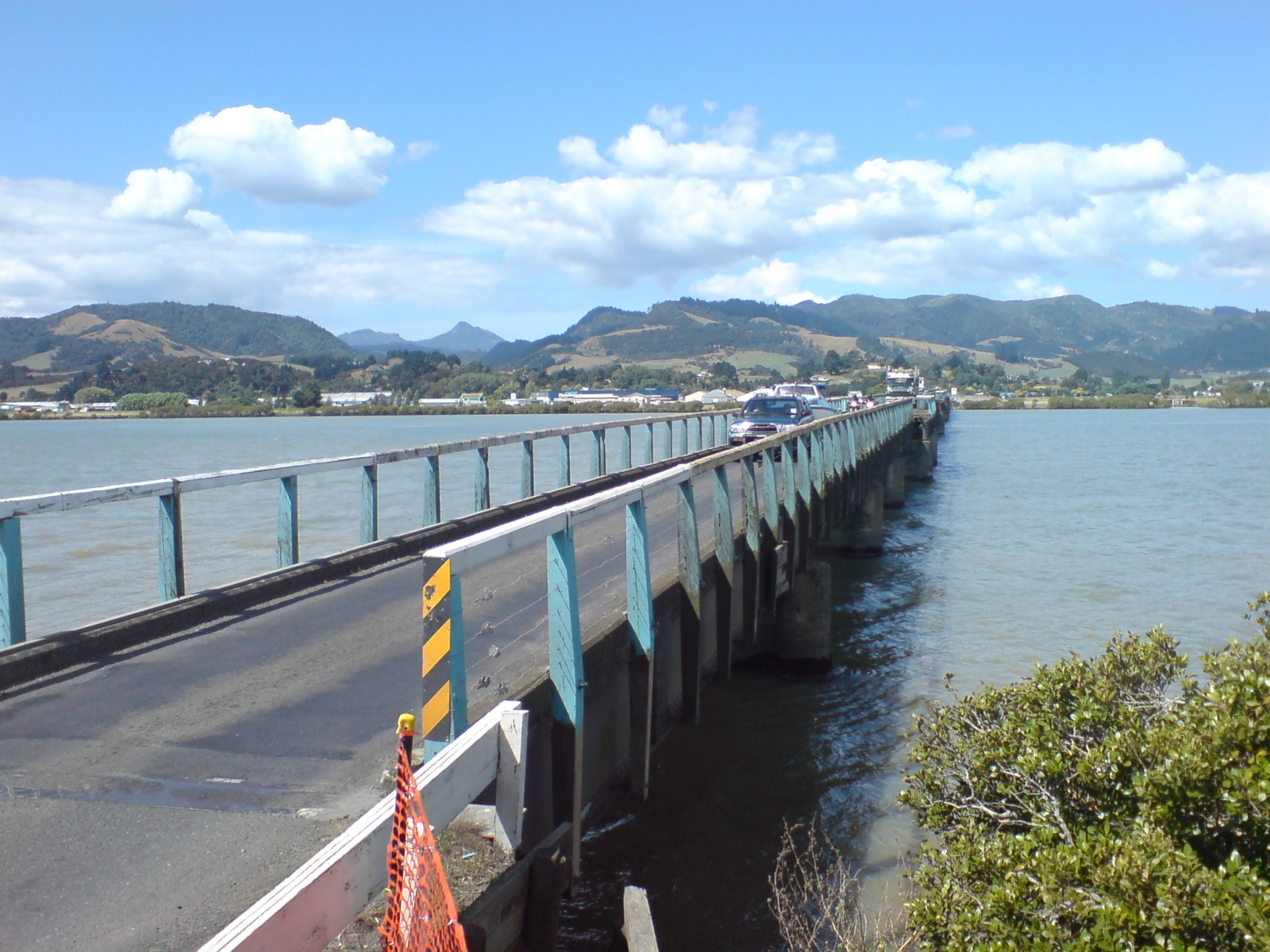
- Looking east over the old bridge
- Coordinates: 37°11′27″S 175°33′43″E
- Carries: Vehicles
- Crosses: Waihou River
- Locale: Hauraki Plains / Coromandel Peninsula
- Maintained by: NZ Transport Agency

Characteristics
- Design: Swing bridge
- Material: Timber piling, concrete piers, steel plate girder spans
- Total length: 463 m
- Width: 4 m, with passing bays (use ceased after signalisation)
- Longest span: 42.7 m (swing span), creating a 15.3 m wide shipping channel
- No. of spans: 23

History
- Designer: J. E. L. Cull
- Construction start: 1926
- Construction end: 1928

Statistics
- Daily traffic: 9000

Heritage New Zealand – Category 1
- Designated: 13 December 1990
- Reference no.: 4681

Location
- Interactive map of Historic Kopu Bridge

(New) Kopu Bridge
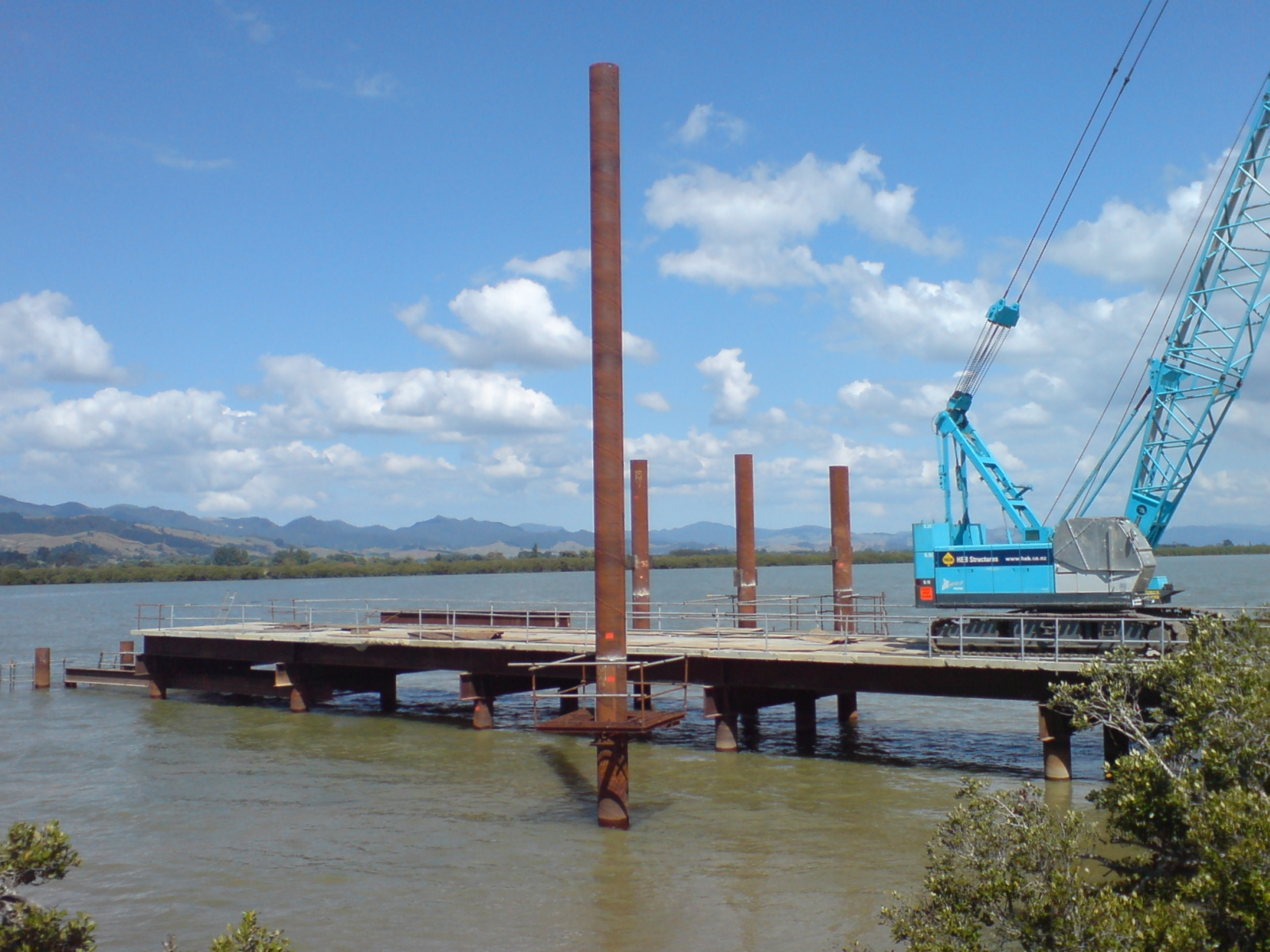
- New bridge being built in early 2010. Working deck shown only, final bridge level much higher
- Coordinates: 37°11′27″S 175°33′43″E
- Carries: Vehicles, bicycles & pedestrians
- Crosses: Waihou River
- Locale: Hauraki Plains / Coromandel Peninsula
- Maintained by: NZ Transport Agency

Characteristics
- Material: Concrete, steel girders
- Total length: 587 m
- Longest span: 42.8 m
- No. of spans: 16
- Clearance below: 6.5 m above mean sea level

History
- Construction start: 2009
- Construction end: 2011
- Opened: 2011

Location
- Interactive map of (New) Kopu Bridge

The Historic Kopu Bridge (originally Hauraki Bridge and sometimes Waihou River Bridge) is a single-lane swing bridge that spans the Waihou River, near its emergence into the Firth of Thames in the Thames-Coromandel District of New Zealand's North Island. The bridge was completed in 1928 and was part of State Highway 25. The swinging span in the middle of the bridge is 43 metres long and with an overall length of 463 metres, the bridge was the longest and oldest single lane bridge within the state highway network. It is also New Zealand's only remaining operational swing bridge.

As the first available crossing of the Waihou River and the main link between the Hauraki Plains and Coromandel Peninsula, it sees a lot of traffic, especially during holidays. Due to a gradual increase in the traffic between Auckland and the Coromandel Peninsula, by the early 1990s the bridge became the most heavily used single lane bridge in the country, with traffic volumes of an average of 9,000 vehicles per day. Traffic flow over the bridge was controlled by traffic lights and the bridge was notorious for queues which formed during peak times such as holiday weekends, when three hours delay were common.

Rarely used as boat traffic declined (especially for shipping use, with the river once navigable all the way up to the town of Paeroa) in the latter years before it was closed to traffic, the swing span could still be opened to provide a 15.3 m wide channel to passing vessels.

The bridge is the only surviving road bridge of the swing span type in the country and Heritage New Zealand lists the bridge as a Category 1 historic place, while it is also on the IPENZ Engineering Heritage Register.

In December 2011 a new two-lane bridge opened directly to the south of the old bridge. The old bridge remains under active threat of demolition. However a local group, the Historic Kopu Bridge Society has been working since 2011 to retain the bridge into community ownership, so that it may remain as a pedestrian and cycleway and NZ's last remaining operational swingbridge.

== History ==
The original bridge was built in 1928, under the lead of the Main Highways Board after negotiations over its construction started in 1911, and planning begun in 1922. It was one of the largest such works of its time, with 23 spans and advanced deep piling for the soft ground of the river bed.

It replaced the barges and ferries which had until then served to cross the Waihou River, connected Thames to the newly drained dairy farming grounds of the Hauraki Plains, and was reckoned to have made a big difference to the local district, having marked the local shift from river transport to road transport becoming dominant, and to Thames moving from a mining town towards a farming service community. It was also considered a project typical of the time and of New Zealand Prime Minister Gordon Coates quest to develop the rural economy.

Up to the 1960s, traffic used the passing bays, but after angry confrontations between motorists had become more common, lights were installed. Until that time, the bridge had still sometimes used for herding of livestock, but soon after the signalisation, further increasing traffic queues began causing calls for a replacement bridge. In late 2009, a webcam was installed to allow online checking of queue lengths during the holiday periods, a feature that in New Zealand had so far been limited to urban areas.

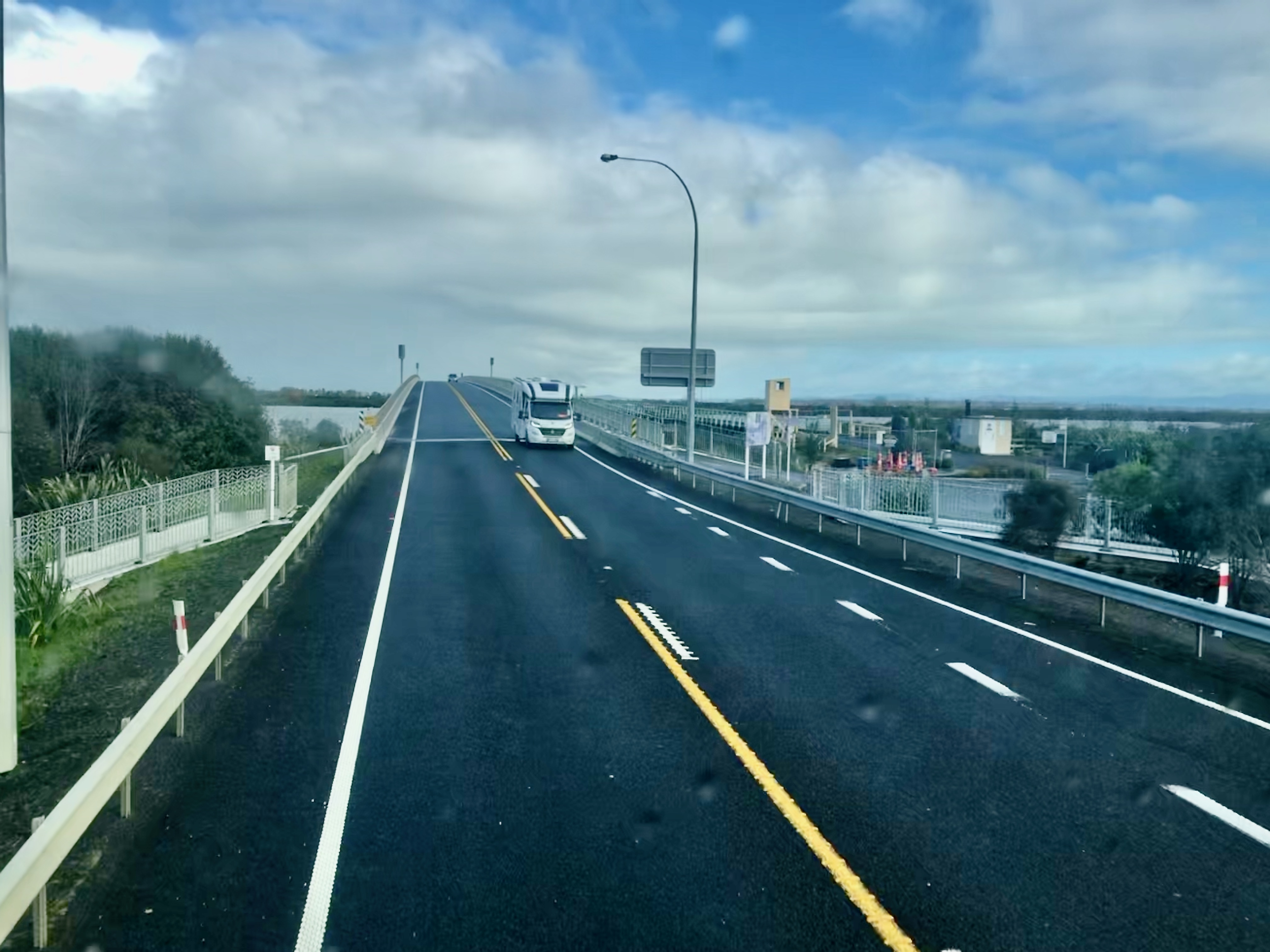
Kopu Bridge in 2021 looking west. The old bridge is to the right

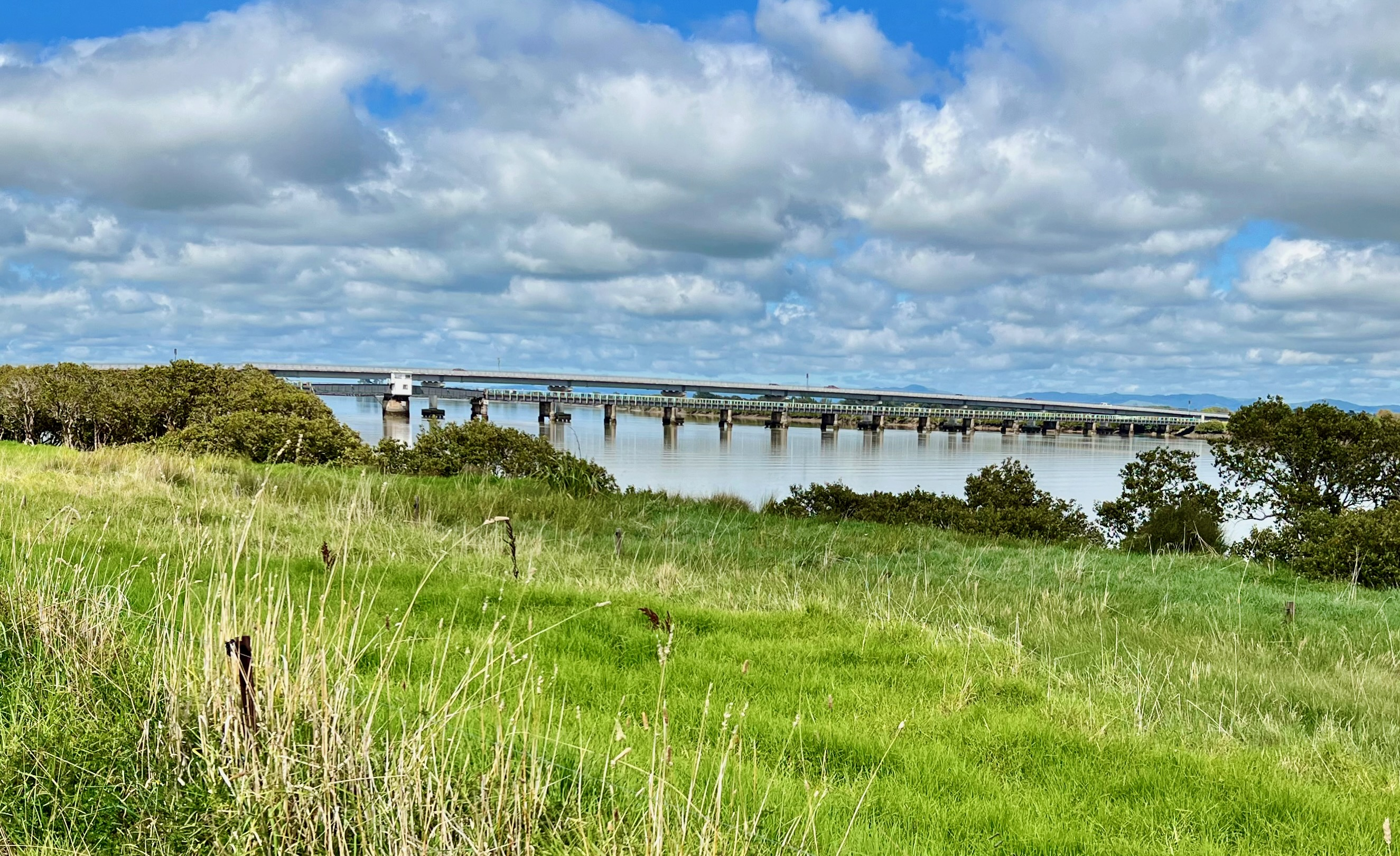
Kopu bridges from Hauraki Rail Trail in 2023

== Replacement ==
In addition to the constrained traffic over the bridge (with flows projected to increase by 2% per year over the next 15 years), investigations in 2001 had also found that the bridge was likely to be severely damaged or might even collapse in an earthquake stronger than that of a 300-500-year return period, and that it had failed to pass safety inspections which require the ability to withstand a 2,500-year return period quake. In 2006, Transit New Zealand announced their intention to build a second bridge slightly upstream of the existing bridge and to route the State Highway over the new bridge. The start date was at that time set for no earlier than 2011, but this was later brought forward to late 2009.

The new bridge is 587 m long, and has 16 spans, with its foundations being driven 36 m to 50 m deep into the riverbed, due to the soft swampy ground not providing good support otherwise. Much of the ground also had to be forcibly compacted first. The design incorporates images of waka and taniwha, and landscaping using native plants. The cost was originally estimated at $32 million but this later rose to $47–48 million (including 2.5 km of new approach road as well as a new roundabout near Thames).

The bridge's navigation channel at the central span is 42.8 m wide and 6.5 m above mean sea level, allowing larger vessels to pass under it, without the need for a swing bridge as for the old structure.

Early reports suggested a completion date of mid-2012, but in late 2011, it was announced that the bridge would be ready in time for the December 2011 holiday traffic.

Due to its historical significance, it was suggested that the existing bridge be retained and upgraded, possibly to be integrated into the Kopu to Kaiaua cycleway along the coast, though the new bridge already provides access to cyclists and walkers. The old bridge was transferred to a community trust on 19 March 2018 with the intention of reopening the bridge by 2022, but by 2023, this had not been achieved.
