= Kopu, New Zealand =

Kopu
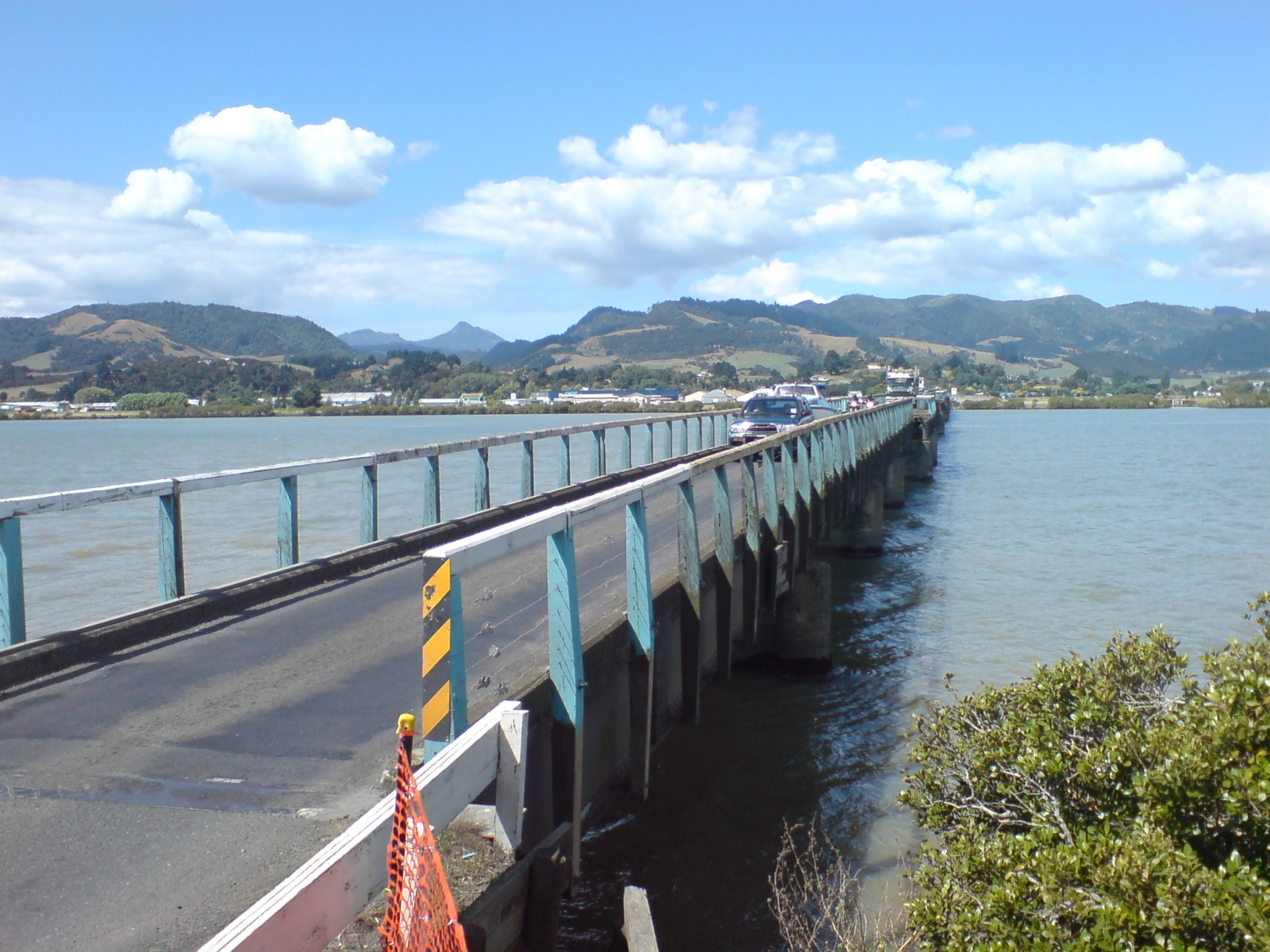
- Old Kopu Bridge looking towards Kopu
- Interactive map of Kopu
- Coordinates: 37.184°S 175.570°E
- Country: New Zealand
- Region: Waikato
- District: Thames-Coromandel District
- Ward: Thames ward
- Community Board: Thames Community
- Electorates: Coromandel; Hauraki-Waikato (Māori)

Government
  - Council: Thames-Coromandel District Council
  - Regional council: Waikato Regional Council
  - Mayor of Thames-Coromandel: Peter Revell
  - Coromandel MP: Scott Simpson
  - Hauraki-Waikato MP: Hana-Rawhiti Maipi-Clarke

Area
  - Total: 9.85 km^{2} (3.80 sq mi)

Population (June 2025)
  - Total: 950
  - Density: 96/km^{2} (250/sq mi)

Kopu is a settlement in on the Coromandel Peninsula in New Zealand's North Island. It is located near Thames, in the Thames-Coromandel District in the Waikato region.

Kopu is located on the Waihou River and features the Kopu Bridge.

== Demography ==
Totora-Kopu statistical area, which Statistics New Zealand considers part of the Thames urban area, covers 9.85 km^{2} (3.80 sq mi) and had an estimated population of 950 as of June 2025, with a population density of 96 people per km^{2}.

Historical population
Year	Pop.	±% p.a.
2006	684	—
2013	810	+2.44%
2018	915	+2.47%
2023	903	−0.26%
The 2006 population is for a smaller area of 8.39 km^{2}. Source:

Totora-Kopu had a population of 903 in the 2023 New Zealand census, a decrease of 12 people (−1.3%) since the 2018 census, and an increase of 93 people (11.5%) since the 2013 census. There were 447 males and 450 females in 354 dwellings. 1.7% of people identified as LGBTIQ+. The median age was 51.5 years (compared with 38.1 years nationally). There were 144 people (15.9%) aged under 15 years, 111 (12.3%) aged 15 to 29, 372 (41.2%) aged 30 to 64, and 276 (30.6%) aged 65 or older.

People could identify as more than one ethnicity. The results were 82.4% European (Pākehā), 23.3% Māori, 1.0% Pasifika, 8.6% Asian, and 1.3% other, which includes people giving their ethnicity as "New Zealander". English was spoken by 96.3%, Māori language by 4.0%, and other languages by 9.3%. No language could be spoken by 2.3% (e.g. too young to talk). New Zealand Sign Language was known by 0.3%. The percentage of people born overseas was 15.6, compared with 28.8% nationally.

Religious affiliations were 34.2% Christian, 1.3% Hindu, 0.3% Islam, 2.3% Māori religious beliefs, 3.0% Buddhist, 0.3% New Age, and 1.3% other religions. People who answered that they had no religion were 45.5%, and 12.0% of people did not answer the census question.

Of those at least 15 years old, 117 (15.4%) people had a bachelor's or higher degree, 399 (52.6%) had a post-high school certificate or diploma, and 249 (32.8%) people exclusively held high school qualifications. The median income was $34,000, compared with $41,500 nationally. 87 people (11.5%) earned over $100,000 compared to 12.1% nationally. The employment status of those at least 15 was that 336 (44.3%) people were employed full-time, 96 (12.6%) were part-time, and 9 (1.2%) were unemployed.

== Economy ==
In 2018, 13.9% of the workforce worked in manufacturing, 13.2% worked in construction, 9.0% worked in healthcare, 6.3% worked in hospitality, 6.3% worked in education, 3.5% worked in transport and 1.4% of the workforce worked in primary industries.

== Transportation ==
As of 2018, among those who commuted to work, 75.7% drove a car, 4.9% rode in a car, and 1.4% walked, ran or cycled.
