= Waihou River =

Waihou River Thames River
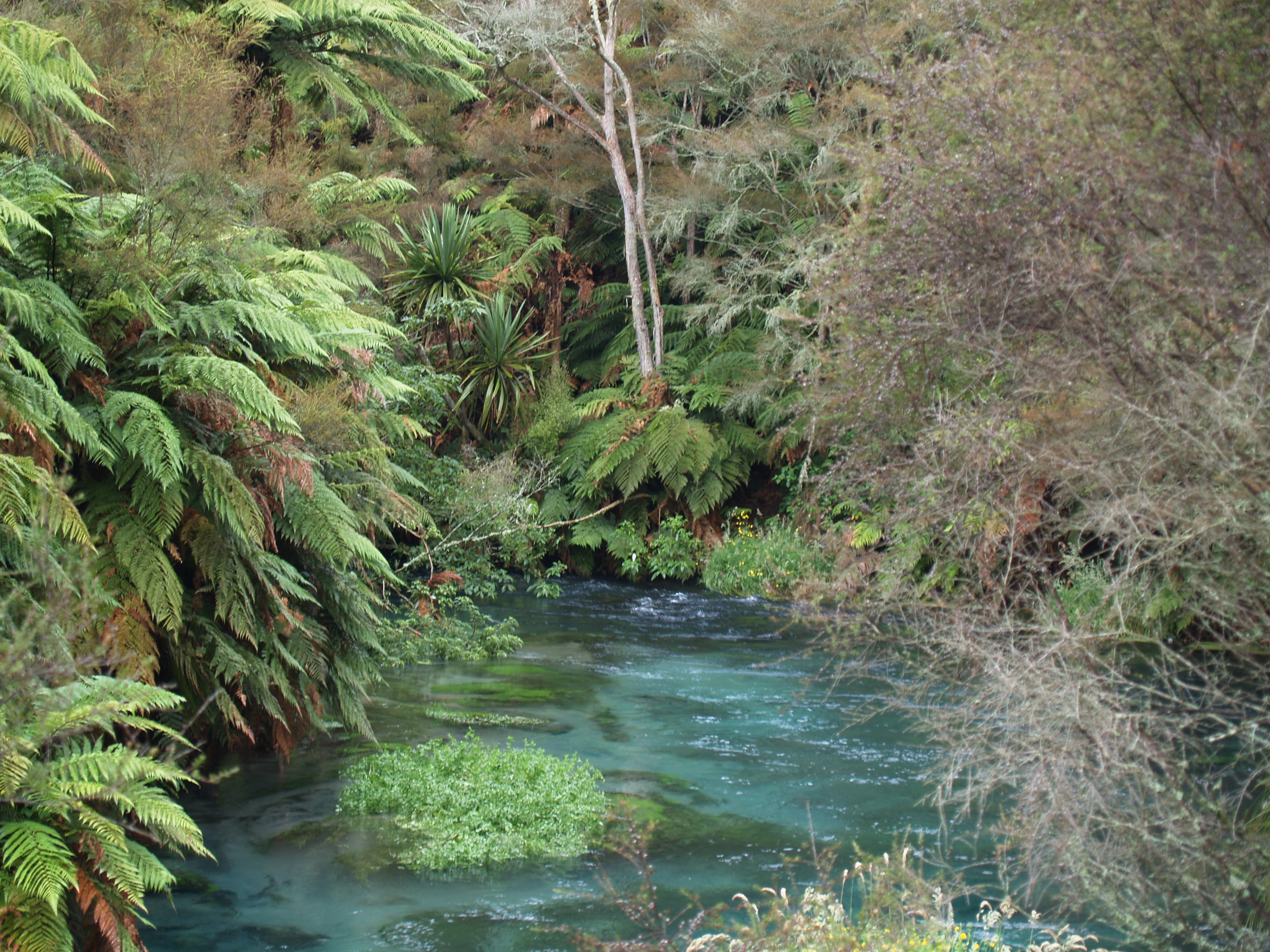
- The Waihou River near Putāruru

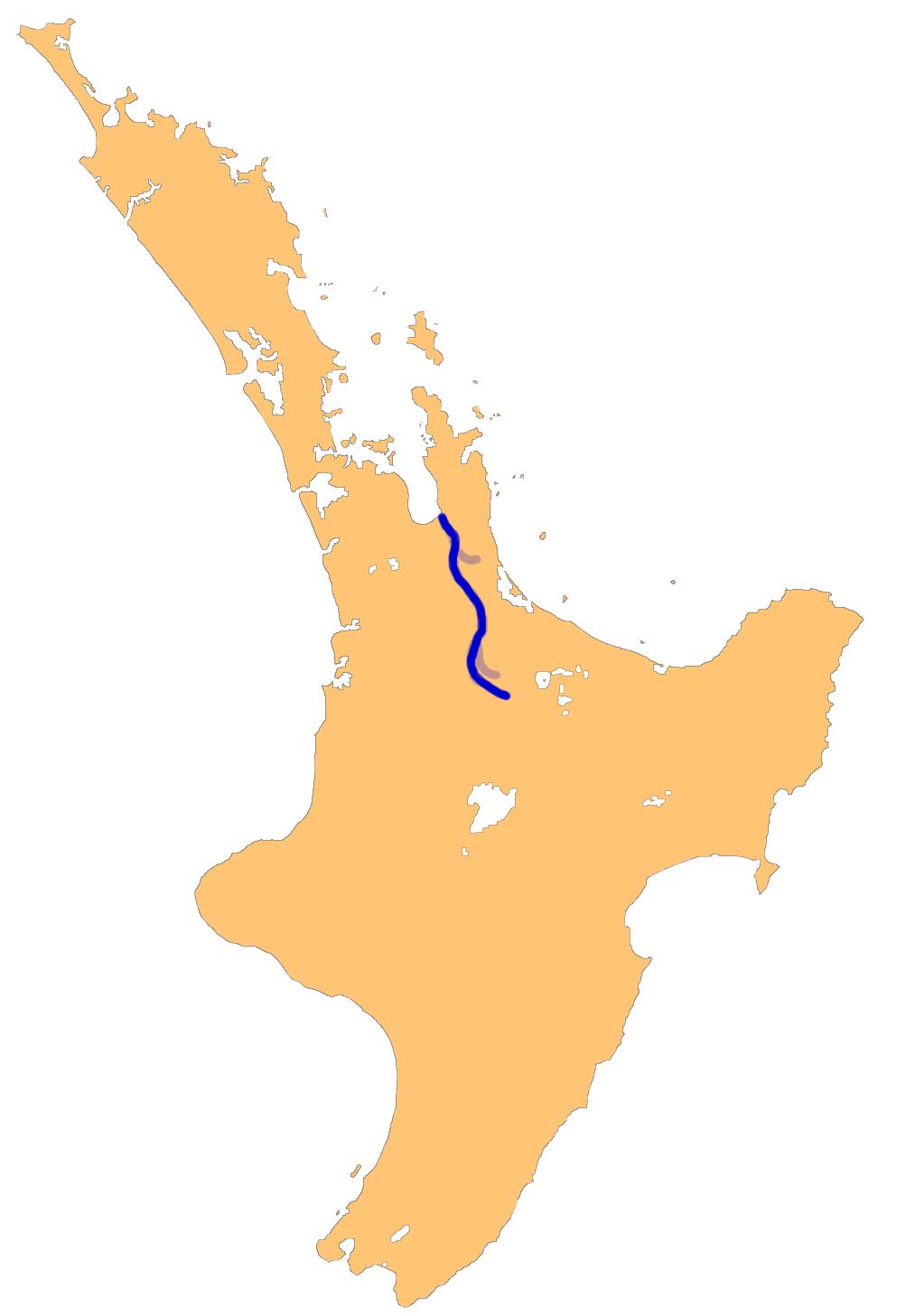
- The Waihou River system
- Native name: Waihou (Māori)

Location
- Country: New Zealand
- Region: Waikato

Physical characteristics
- Source: Mamaku Ranges
  - coordinates: 38°4′34″S 176°1′52″E
- Mouth: Firth of Thames
  - coordinates: 37°10′5″S 175°32′30″E
  - elevation: Sea level
- Length: 150 kilometres (93 mi)
- Basin size: 1,982 square kilometres (765 sq mi)

Basin features
- Tributaries
  - right: Ohinemuri River, Komata River, Hikutaia River, Puriri River
- Bridges: Kopu Bridge

The Waihou River is located in the northern North Island of New Zealand. Its former name, Thames River, was bestowed by Captain James Cook in November 1769, when he explored 14 mi (23 km) of the river from the mouth. An older Māori name was "Wai Kahou Rounga". A 1947 Geographic Board enquiry ruled that the official name would be Waihou.

== Geography ==
The river flows north for 150 kilometres (93 mi) from the Mamaku Ranges past the towns of Putāruru, Te Aroha, Paeroa and Turua, before reaching the Firth of Thames at the south end of the Hauraki Gulf near the town of Thames. In its lower reaches, the river and the nearby Piako River form the wide alluvial Hauraki Plains. Just before the river reaches the ocean, State Highway 25 crosses the river over the Kopu Bridge, which was the longest single lane bridge in the country at 463 metres (1,519 ft) and the only remaining swing bridge on a New Zealand state highway. The bridge was infamous for the queues of vehicles travelling to and from the Coromandel Peninsula until a new two lane bridge was opened in December 2011. Tributaries include the Waimakariri Stream, Waiomou Stream, Oraka Stream and the Ohinemuri River.

== History ==
Many areas on the banks of the Waihou River were settled by Hauraki Māori, such as Oruarangi pā and Paterangi pā near Matatoki, and the Te Raupa pā and Waiwhau pā near Paeroa. The mouth of the river was famous as a location for pātiki (flounder) fishing.

In the 1910s stopbanks and floodgates were constructed along the Waihou River in order to protect farmland from flooding, including a canal constructed at the point where the Waihou River and Ohinemuri River meet, west of Paeroa. Further work occurred in the 1980s after extensive flooding in 1981.

=== Transport ===
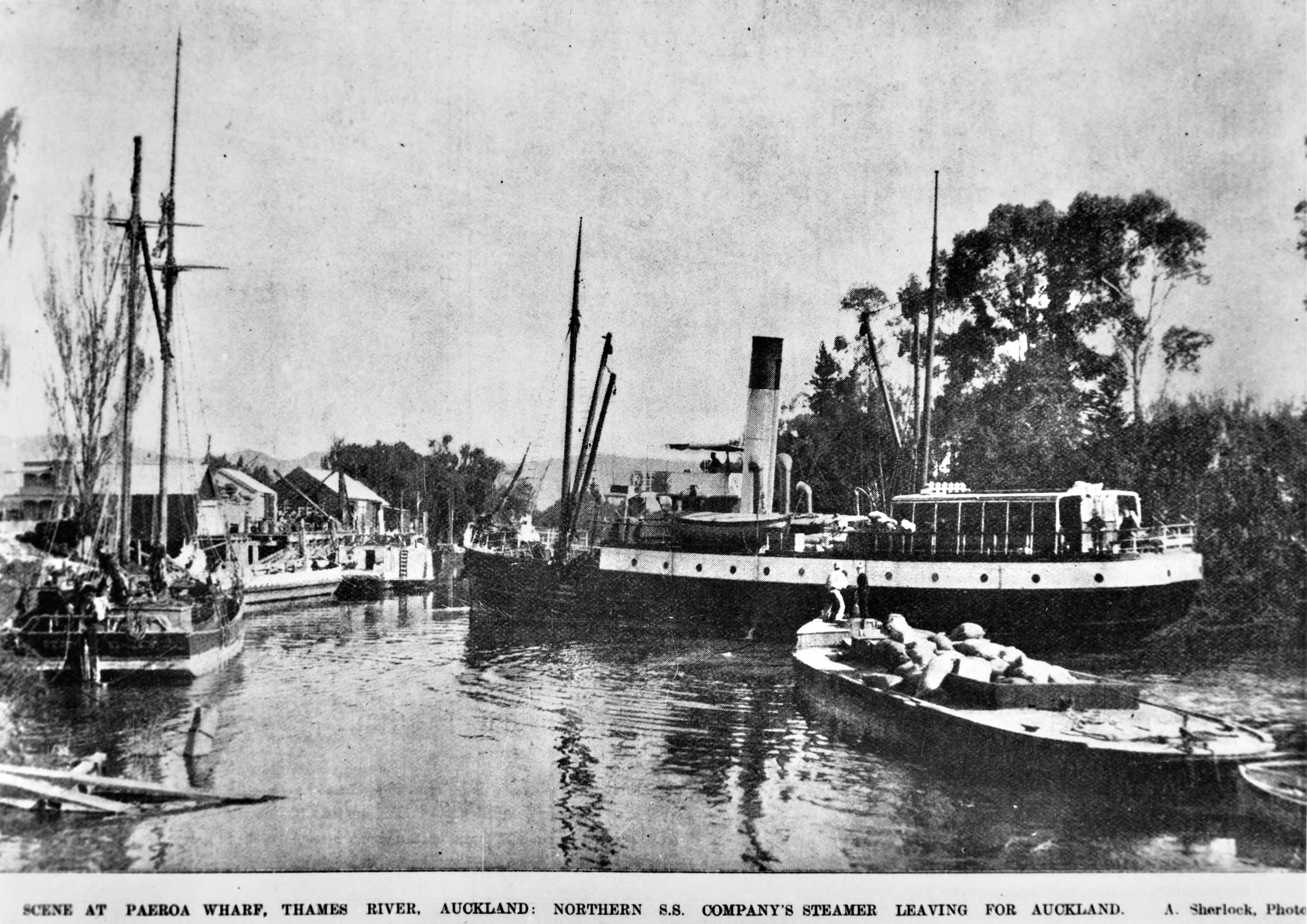
Taniwha at Paeroa wharf in 1903

In 1879 Te Au o Tonga, or the Falls of Awotonga, were destroyed by 200 pounds (91 kg) of dynamite to free the navigation of the river for shipping. There was a water column of 150 ft (46 m). Other parts of the river had been cleared in the same manner in previous years. Josiah Firth had Kotuku built in 1879 and spent £7,442 to 1880, extending navigation to allow the 3 ft (0.91 m) deep steamer as far as Stanley Landing, near Gordon. By 1909 Northern Steamship had a shed at Te Aroha, reached by a steamer 3 days each week. By 1923 a 30 ft (9.1 m) launch could reach Okauia. A 1925 report said there had once been a steady traffic. Regular traffic on the river ended in 1947.

There were also ferries across the river -

- A vehicle ferry crossed the river at Te Aroha from 1879 until the bridge was built in 1885
- Puke Ferry was launched in 1899 and closed when Ngahina Bridge opened on 10 March 1915. The bridge was replaced in the 1960s.
- From 1912 Wharepoa ferry linked Netherton, Kerepehi and Turua with Wharepoa. It was replaced by a Netherton-Komata ferry in 1926, which closed in 1936.
- In 1884 a punt crossing from Opani Point to Kopu overturned. By 1911 a public petition called for a ferry, but there were many delays; described as farcical in a 1919 report. The ferry finally started on 28 August 1922 taking 7 to 12 minutes for the crossing. It ran until Kopu Bridge opened on 11 May 1928.

== Recreation ==
The river supports large populations of rainbow and brown trout. A survey conducted in 2009 showed that the upper section of the river supported over 700 fish per kilometre.

== Pollution ==
The water quality at Te Aroha is in the worst category for dissolved reactive phosphorus and also the worst 25% of all sites measured for other pollutants. At Okauia the river is in the worst category for E. coli, though the measurement may have been overestimated. In the upper reaches of the river the main pollutant is phosphorus. Water flows are measured at Te Aroha and Okauia.

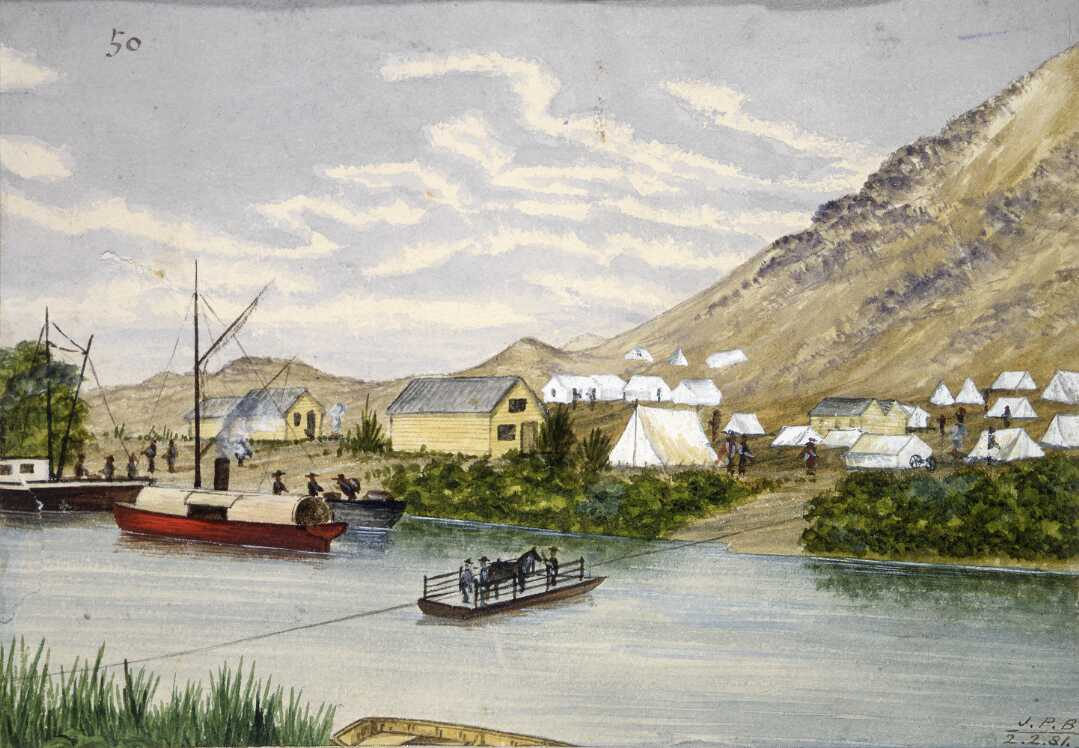
An 1881 painting of the Waihou River, entitled Dibsell's Landing, by John Philemon Backhouse

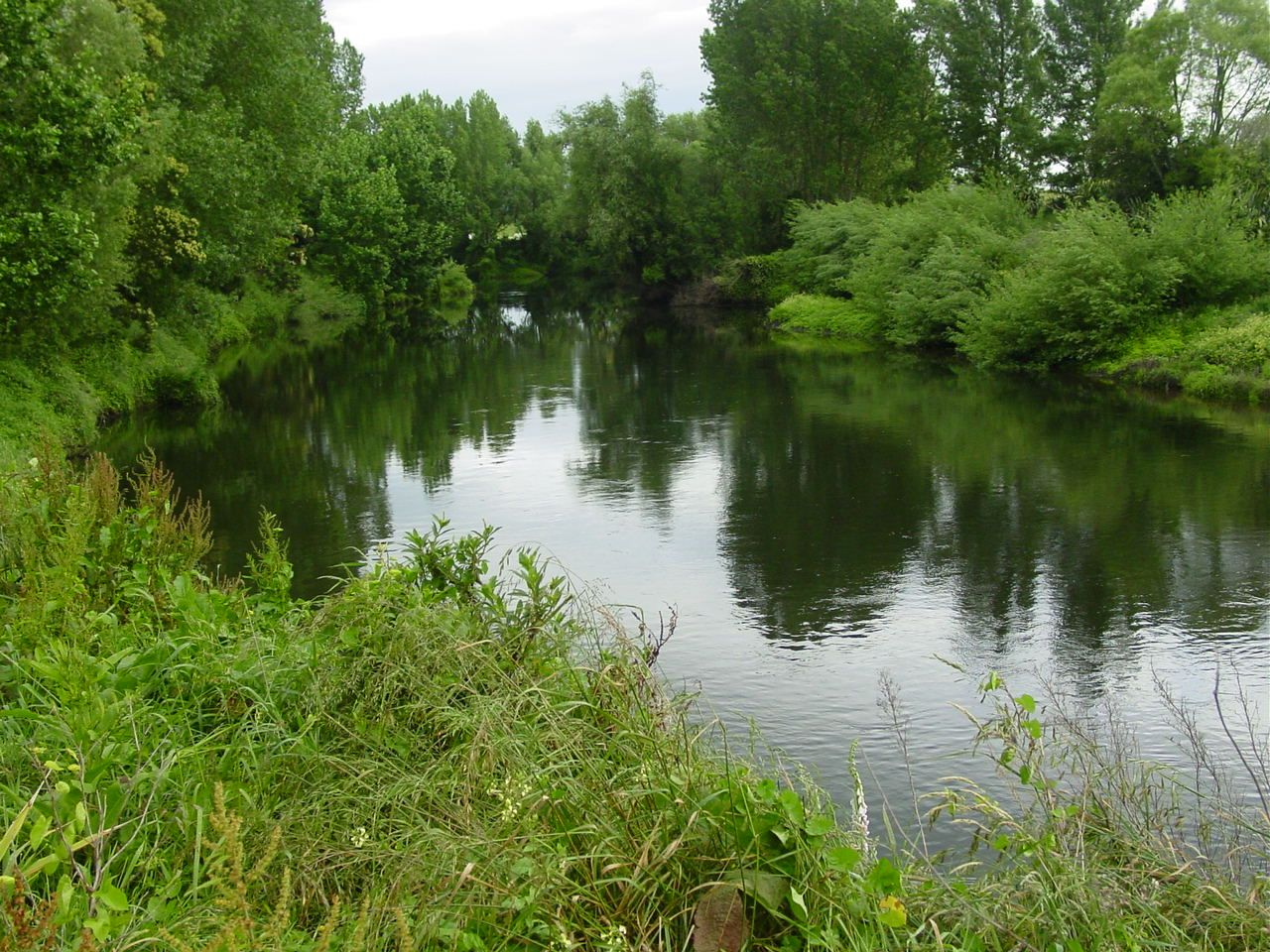
Waihou River
