= Hauraki Rail Trail =

New Zealand rail trail

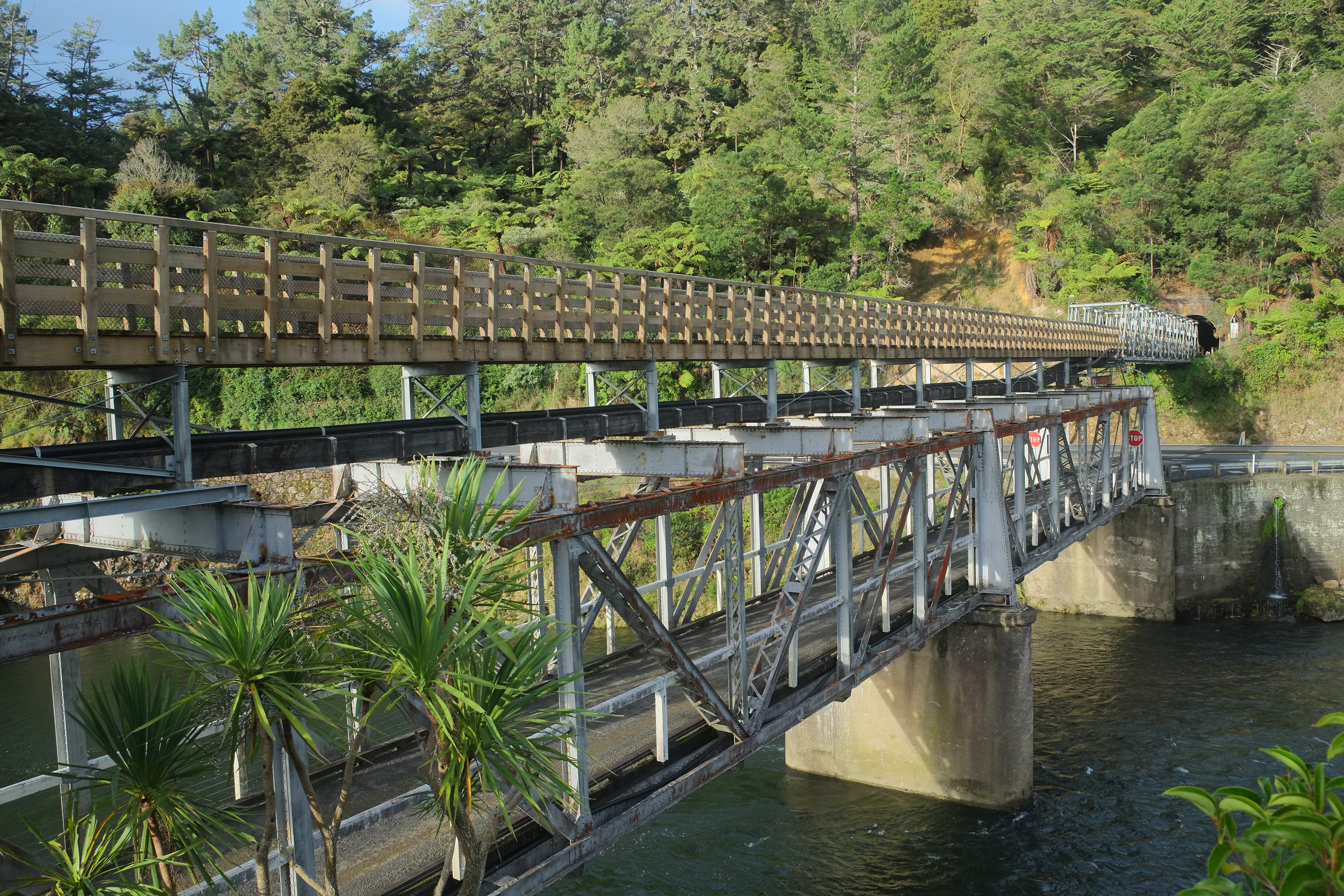
The Karangahake Gorge bridge and rail tunnel, part of the rail trail.

The Hauraki Rail Trail is one of the Great Rides of the New Zealand Cycle Trail system, using parts of the abandoned ECMT and Thames Branch railways in the Hauraki Gulf plains and the Coromandel Peninsula.

== Territory coverage ==
The 197 kilometres (122 mi) trail officially starts from Kaiaua in the north, and traces the Shorebird Coast along the Firth of Thames, before heading south via Paeroa to then branch either east towards Waihi (via the Karangahake Gorge) or south to Te Aroha. In the Karangahake Gorge, the rail trail passes through a 1,100 metres (3,609 ft) long tunnel, which has been fitted with electrical lighting.

The trail takes around three days to complete for most fitness levels. It is one of the easiest cycle trails in New Zealand, and offers a diverse range of scenery, from pōhutukawa trees, through lush farm land, and onto some of New Zealand's pioneering past.

== Length and extensions ==
The trail was opened in 2012, with 95% of 69 km completed at the end of 2012, and all of the original length open from as early as 2013 (New Zealand Cycle Trail's official website).

In September 2013, the connecting section from Waikino to Waihi was opened, and the network then encompassed over 80 kilometres (50 mi) of easy-riding cycle trails.

Scoping for a further section, from Kopu to Kaiaua along the Firth of Thames' coast was expected to start in mid-2013, adding another 56 kilometres (35 mi) to the track. It opened in August 2020.

A new 37 km (23 mi) path south from Te Aroha to Matamata was officially opened in November 2020.

== Popularity ==
In 2013 the trail was described as the most popular cycle trail in New Zealand, despite only having been open for less than a year. From January 2013 to April 2013, monthly cycle counts on the busiest section (Karangahake Gorge) averaged over 7,000 cyclists a month. The trail was particularly popular with the "baby boomer", family clientele from Auckland and the wider Waikato, with 24% of users coming from Auckland, 15% from Hamilton, and a large proportion of users being older riders – based on a University of Waikato survey. Both local businesses and Council agree that the trail had a significant economic benefit for the region, and had already become a major promotional asset for tourism.

== Awards ==
The new wooden bridges on the rail trail received the "Sustainability Award" in the Timber Design Awards in 2012.
