= Waihi-Waikino Gold Tramway =

Coordinates: 37.411951°S 175.773189°E

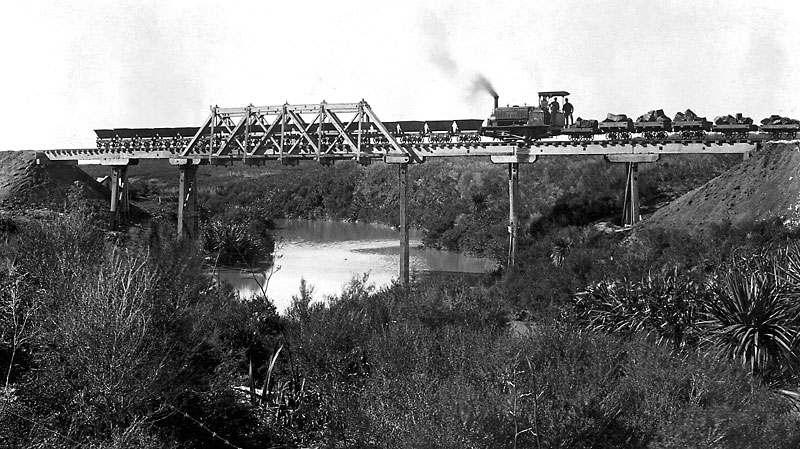
"Ohinemuri" on Black Bridge over the Ohinemuri River just upstream from the Masonry dam, ca 1897

The Waihi-Waikino Gold Tramway (also known locally as The Rake) was a narrow-gauge railway which ran between gold mines at Waihi and the Victoria Battery at Waikino. Owned by the Waihi Gold Mining Company, it operated from 1897 to 1952. It was the only private railway in New Zealand used by the gold industry.

== History ==
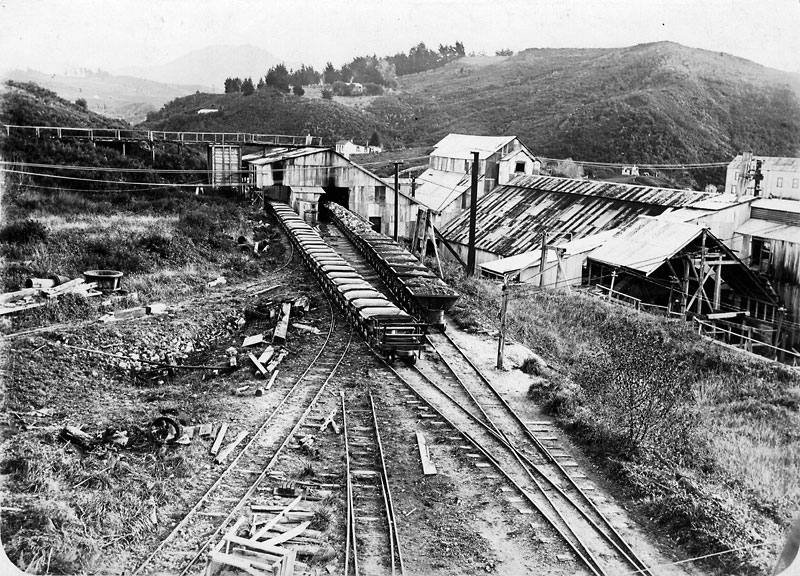
Two rakes of trucks at the Victoria Battery stone breakers, 1940s

The township of Waihi was home to the Martha Gold Mine, with the first stamping battery coming into use in 1882. By the mid 1890s the mine was needing a new stamping battery, which was decided to be put down the Ohinemuri River at Waikino due to the availability of water power, and to keep stamping noise away from Waihi township. The tramway was built parallel to the Ohinemuri River, 5.75 miles (9.25 km) long, to the uncommon gauge of 2 ft 9 in (838 mm). Maximum gradient was 1 in 40 (25‰), with the rails being 40 lb/yard (20 kg/m). The tramway started with only one locomotive, named "Ohinemuri", but more were purchased later, ending up with 5 from Manning Wardle, except for the last which was from W. G. Bagnall, as the former company had ceased operating by 1934 when it was purchased. The year 1905 saw the NZ Government Railway open to Waihi, and an overpass was built east of Waihi station to allow the NZR line to pass over the Rake Line. The structure is still there today. By 1952 increasing costs lead to the closure of the Martha Mine (the mine later re-opened in 1987 as open cast). The tramway took around two years to be lifted, with no locos or rolling stock being preserved.

== Rolling stock ==
=== Locomotives ===
Wheels	Manufacturer	Number	Photo	Year	Name	Cylinder Bore x Stroke in Inches
0-4-0 / 0-4-2	Manning Wardle	1329		1896	Ohinemuri	9 x 14
0-4-2	Manning Wardle	1424		1898	Victoria	9 x 14
0-4-2	Manning Wardle	1497		1900	Albert	?
4-4-0	Manning Wardle	1662		1905	Waikino	10 x 16
4-4-2	Manning Wardle	1753		1909	Dominion	10 x 16
2-4-2	W. G. Bagnall	2513		1934	Empire	10 x 16

=== Wagons ===
Small 4-wheel V-tip trucks were used for the transport of quartz. Some small goods and flat wagons were used, the latter occasionally for the exceptional transport of passengers, as the railway has never been a common carrier.

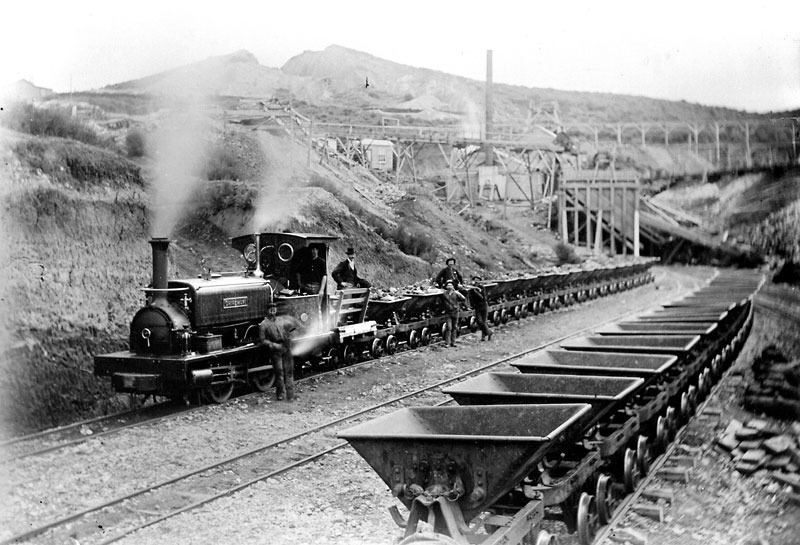
"Ohinemuri" and rake of full trucks at No.1 Shaft Hoppers, 1900

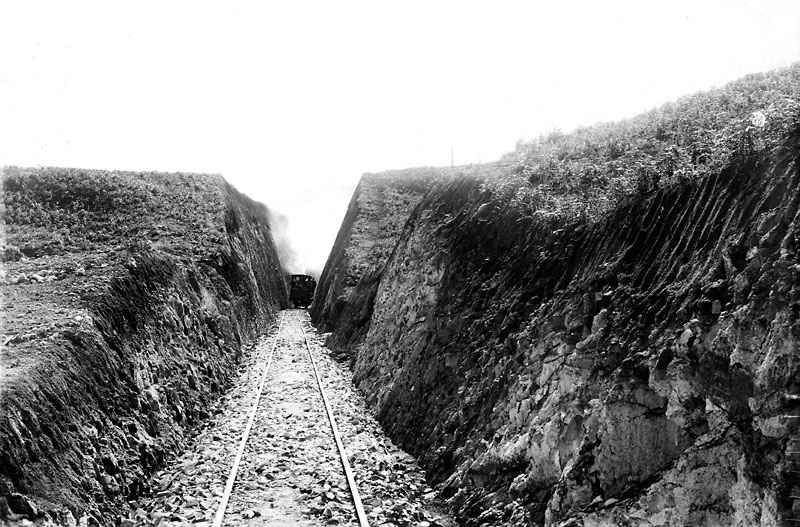
Rohaus cutting on railroad to Waikino. "Ohinemuri" travelling toward Waikino, ca. 1897

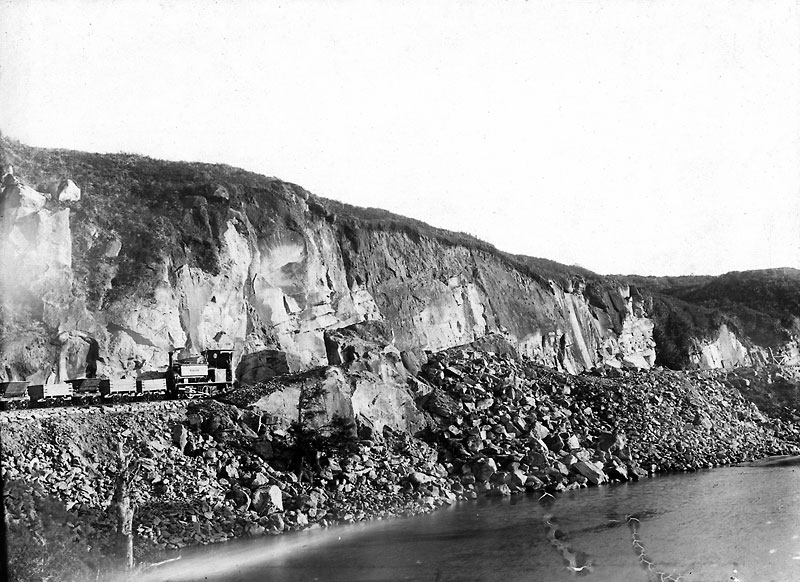
"Ohinemuri" in the second largest cutting 1½ miles from Waikino

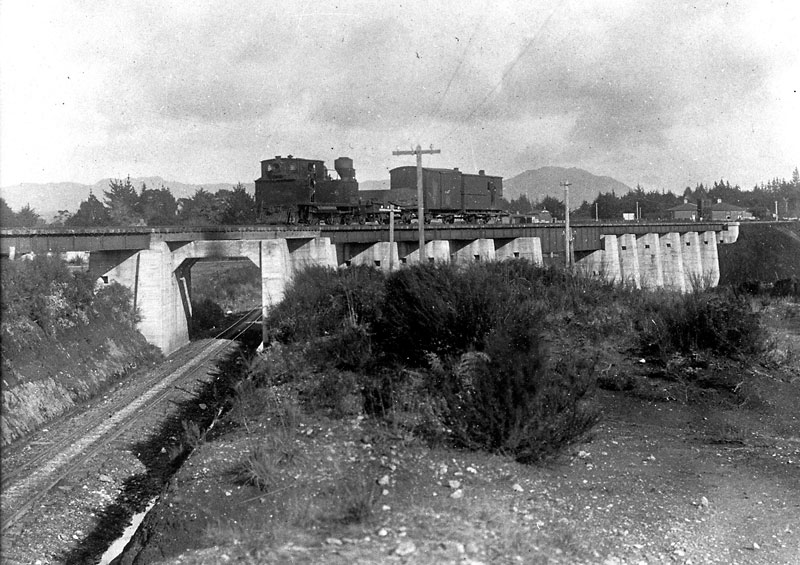
NZR F^{A} class loco crossing Waihi Gold Co rake line on the Mangatoetoe Bridge, Mount Karangahake in background

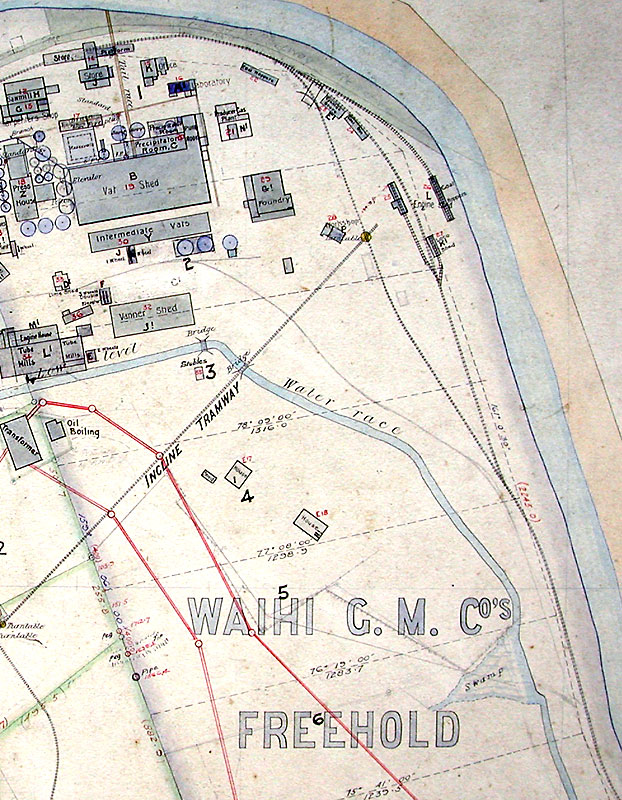
Tramway enters at bottom right. Left-hand branch to the stone breakers left of map. Right-hand branches to NZR (grey), coal hoppers, engine sheds. Turntable where tramway and incline to kilns meet.

== Nearby railways ==
The Victoria Battery Tramway now runs a 1.2 kilometres (0.75 mi) long 2 ft (610 mm) gauge railway on the former battery site at Waikino.

The Goldfields Railway is a 3 ft 6 in (1,067 mm) gauge heritage railway between Waihi and Waikino on a section of track that was part of the East Coast Main Trunk Railway until the Kaimai Tunnel deviation made it redundant in 1978.
