= Apata, New Zealand =

Settlement in the Bay of Plenty, New Zealand

Apata
- Rural community
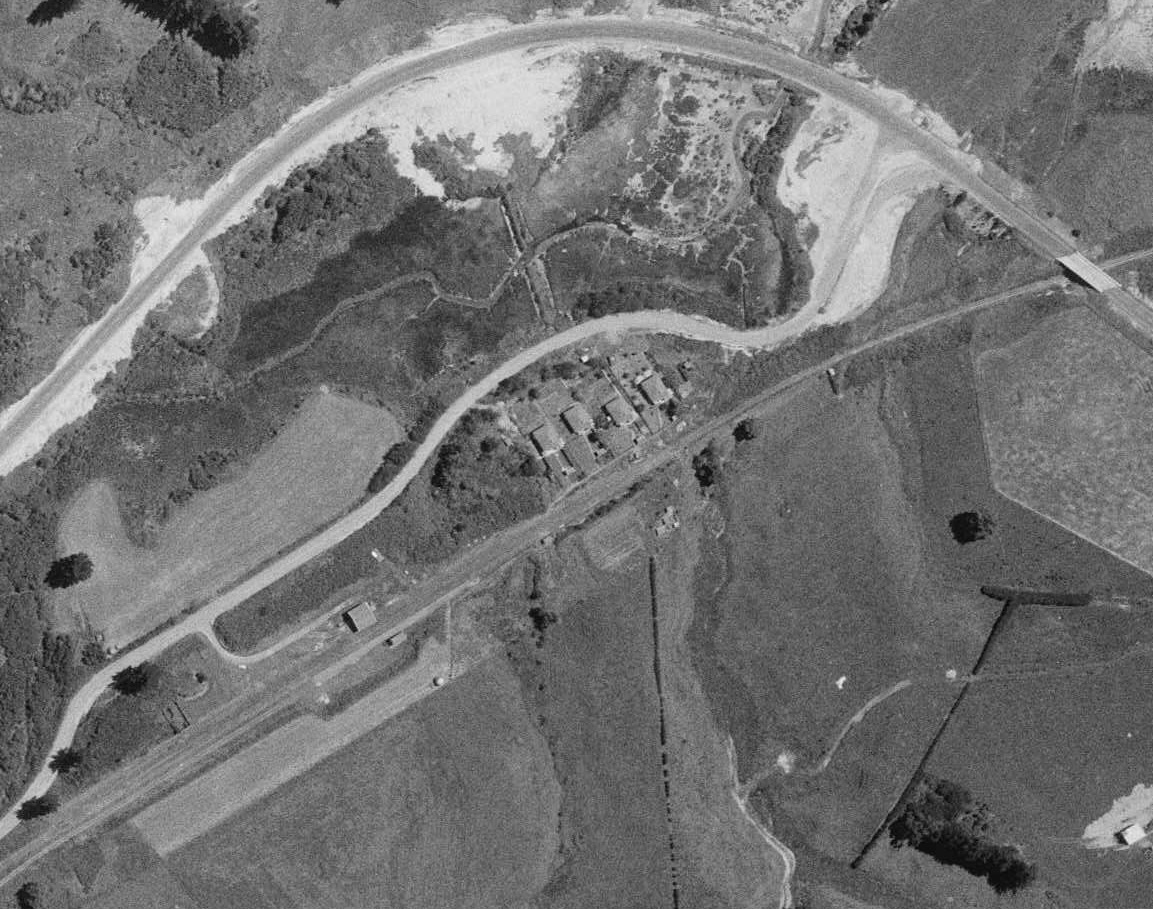
- Apata railway station and houses in 1959, when SH2 was newly built
- Interactive map of Apata
- Coordinates: 37.6484°S 175.9845°E
- Country: New Zealand
- Region: Bay of Plenty
- Territorial authority: Western Bay of Plenty District
- Ward: Katikati-Waihi Beach Ward
- Electorates: Coromandel; Waiariki (Māori)

Government
  - Territorial Authority: Western Bay of Plenty District Council
  - Regional council: Bay of Plenty Regional Council
  - Mayor of Western Bay of Plenty: James Denyer
  - Coromandel MP: Scott Simpson
  - Waiariki MP: Rawiri Waititi

Area
  - Total: 2.65 km^{2} (1.02 sq mi)

Population (2023)
  - Total: 186
  - Density: 70.2/km^{2} (182/sq mi)
- Postcode(s): 3172

Apata is a locality in the Western Bay of Plenty District and Bay of Plenty Region of New Zealand's North Island, close to Tauranga Harbour. The East Coast Main Trunk railway and State Highway 2 run through Apata.

== History ==
People started living in the Bay of Plenty around 1400AD and later four Ngāi Te Rangi pā sites were built around Apata. Following their defeat at Te Ranga in 1864 the Government forced purchase of the 4,359 acres (1,764 ha) Apata Block, as part of Te Puna block, including Pahoia and Wainui, to award to 1st Waikato Militia Regiment settlers.

A school with 9 pupils opened in a house on 4 July 1927. The school moved to Pahoia on 4 August 1931.

Since 1984 Apata has a kiwifruit and avocado packhouse/coolstore beside the old railway station site.

Fundraising for Apata Hall began in 1943 and it opened in 1952. It was burned down in 2004, after police closed a party there and an 18 year old English tourist set light to a car, for which he had a 2 year prison sentence. In 2011 it was replaced by a hall at Pahoia and the old site became a freedom camping area.

=== Railway station ===
Apata had a station on the East Coast Main Trunk from 28 March 1928 to 11 September 1967, though a special train ran on 29 February 1928 and goods were carried from 5 March. New Zealand Railways (NZR) took over from the Public Works Department (PWD) on 18 June 1928. The station had a shelter shed, cart approach, a 30 ft (9.1 m) x 20 ft (6.1 m) goods shed, cattle and sheep yards, a loading bank, 4 railway houses (sold and removed in the 1970s) and a passing loop for 48 wagons. It also had toilets until they were closed in 1958. The stationmaster for the area was at Katikati. There remains a passing loop at the station site and another at Whatakao, 4.13 km (2.57 mi) to the west.

Trains averaged around 20 km/h (12 mph). For example, a train in 1930 was advertised as leaving Paeroa at 6am, Waihi at 7.7am, Apata 8.32am and reaching Tauranga at 9.40am. Waihi was 21.28 km (13.22 mi) from Paeroa, Apata 61.82 km (38.41 mi) and Tauranga 81.66 km (50.74 mi).

The station was on the 18.5 mi (29.8 km) section of the ECMT between Tahawai and Te Puna, work on which was stopped in 1922 to save money. In 1924 Sir W. G. Armstrong, Whitworth & Co won a contract to build it for about £500,000. Due to difficulties in establishing firm foundations for the line and its bridges, it was the last section of the Auckland-Tāneatua line to be completed. It was unusual at the time for contracts to be given to private companies, rather than to PWD, or worker cooperatives. The contractors built a wharf and stacking yard at Mount Maunganui, and landing-stages at several estuaries along the Harbour. They built 100 x 2-man, 13 x 4-man, 66 x 6-man huts, 46 married quarters, 3 cookhouses, 4 bathhouses, 2 recreation-rooms, quarters for field engineers and had two steam-locomotives, six steam-navvies, six petrol-locomotives, two steam pile-drivers, concrete-mixers, launches, punts, motor-lorries and ballast-trucks. Earthworks amounted to 1,229,000 yd^{3} (940,000 m^{3}). 15 large bridges were built, using steel plate girders. Ballast came from pits at Aongatete.

When the Kaimai Deviation, between Waharoa and Apata, through the Kaimai tunnel, opened on 12 September 1978, the original line closed, except for the Goldfields Railway, west from Waihi. Percy Allen, the Minister of Works, turned the first sod for the Deviation on 2 October 1965 at Apata. It was then estimated as a £5.75m project, set against repairs of £3m needed for the line via Waihi. The Deviation and was variously described as a 25 km (16 mi), 24.9 km (15.5 mi), or 24.01 km (14.92 mi) line. Kiwirail's Network Map indicates the distance as 25.38 km (15.77 mi), Apata being 77.38 km (48.08 mi) from Hamilton and Waharoa Junction 52 km (32 mi). It reduced the distance from Hamilton by 50.65 km (31.47 mi), or another source indicates 55.88 km (34.72 mi), Apata being shown as 64 mi 52 ch (104.0 km) from Morrinsville Junction in 1943, which was 18 mi 12 ch (29.2 km) from Frankton Junction and Apata as 77.32 km (48.04 mi) from the ECMT junction points in 1987.

In 1981 it was decided the railway between Apata and Katikati would remain to proposed processing plants at Katikati. However, the track was lifted, though the 210 ft (64 m) Wainui bridge remains.

	Former adjoining stations	
Walton; Line open, station closed 29.77 km (18.50 mi); Towards Hamilton	East Coast Main Trunk via Kaimai Tunnel	Pahoia; Line open, station closed 1.91 km (1.19 mi); Towards Tāneatua
Aongatete; Line closed, station closed 6.74 km (4.19 mi); Towards Paeroa	East Coast Main Trunk (closed)	Terminus

== Demographics ==
Apata locality covers 2.65 km^{2} (1.02 sq mi). The demographics are also included at Pahoia.

Historical population
Year	Pop.	±% p.a.
2006	132	—
2013	126	−0.66%
2018	159	+4.76%
2023	186	+3.19%

Apata had a population of 186 in the 2023 New Zealand census, an increase of 27 people (17.0%) since the 2018 census, and an increase of 60 people (47.6%) since the 2013 census. There were 84 males and 105 females in 66 dwellings. 1.6% of people identified as LGBTIQ+. The median age was 46.2 years (compared with 38.1 years nationally). There were 42 people (22.6%) aged under 15 years, 18 (9.7%) aged 15 to 29, 78 (41.9%) aged 30 to 64, and 48 (25.8%) aged 65 or older.

People could identify as more than one ethnicity. The results were 95.2% European (Pākehā), 12.9% Māori, 4.8% Pasifika, 1.6% Asian, and 3.2% other, which includes people giving their ethnicity as "New Zealander". English was spoken by 98.4%, Māori by 1.6%, and other languages by 8.1%. No language could be spoken by 1.6% (e.g. too young to talk). The percentage of people born overseas was 17.7, compared with 28.8% nationally.

Religious affiliations were 25.8% Christian, 1.6% Māori religious beliefs, and 1.6% other religions. People who answered that they had no religion were 66.1%, and 6.5% of people did not answer the census question.

Of those at least 15 years old, 36 (25.0%) people had a bachelor's or higher degree, 81 (56.2%) had a post-high school certificate or diploma, and 27 (18.8%) people exclusively held high school qualifications. The median income was $44,000, compared with $41,500 nationally. 18 people (12.5%) earned over $100,000 compared to 12.1% nationally. The employment status of those at least 15 was 69 (47.9%) full-time and 33 (22.9%) part-time.
