= 1970 New Zealand bravery awards =

The 1970 New Zealand bravery awards were announced via two Special Honours Lists dated 18 and 20 May 1970, and recognised three people for acts of bravery in 1969 and 1970.

== George Medal (GM) ==
- Murray Hemopo – of Matamata.

In recognition of his gallantry following a cave in at Kaimai Tunnel on the 24th day of February 1970.

== Queen's Commendation for Brave Conduct ==
- Station Officer Trevor Henry Sampson – of New Plymouth.
- Fireman David Allan Weir – of New Plymouth.

In recognition of their gallant services during rescue operations when two men were trapped in an excavation at New Plymouth on 22 December 1969.
