= Paeroa railway station =

Defunct railway station in New Zealand

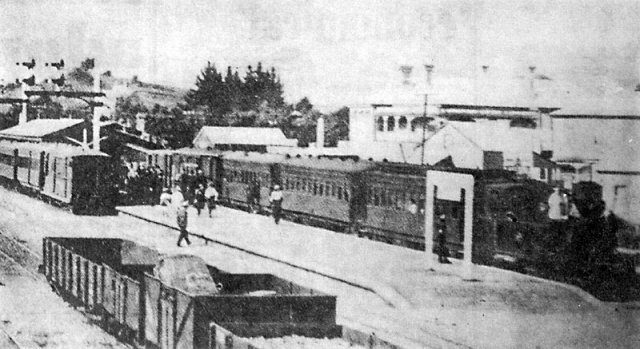
- 1895 Paeroa station and Paeroa Hotel in 1913

General information
- Coordinates: 37.3671°S 175.6664°E
- Elevation: 5 m (16 ft)
- Owner: New Zealand Railways Department
- Line: Thames Branch
- Distance: Morrinsville 44.12 km (27.41 mi)

History
- Opened: 20 December 1895
- Closed: 28 June 1991 closed to passengers 20 July 1959
- Rebuilt: 980 m (0.61 mi) to the north, on 1 September 1925
- Former names: Ohinemuri until 1 March 1896

Services
Preceding station	Historical railways	Following station
Tirohia; Line closed, station closed 9.84 km (6.11 mi)	Thames Branch; NZR	Komata North; Line closed, station closed 3.29 km (2.04 mi)
Paeroa South; Line closed, station closed 2.8 km (1.7 mi)	East Coast Main Trunk; NZR	Mackaytown; Line closed, station closed 3.12 km (1.94 mi)
Location

Paeroa railway station is a former railway station in Paeroa; on the Thames Branch, and on the East Coast Main Trunk Railway to Waihi. Between 1895 and 1991 Paeroa had a station at the north end of the town centre, followed by one further north, another back near the town centre and then another over a mile south of the town.

== 1895 station ==
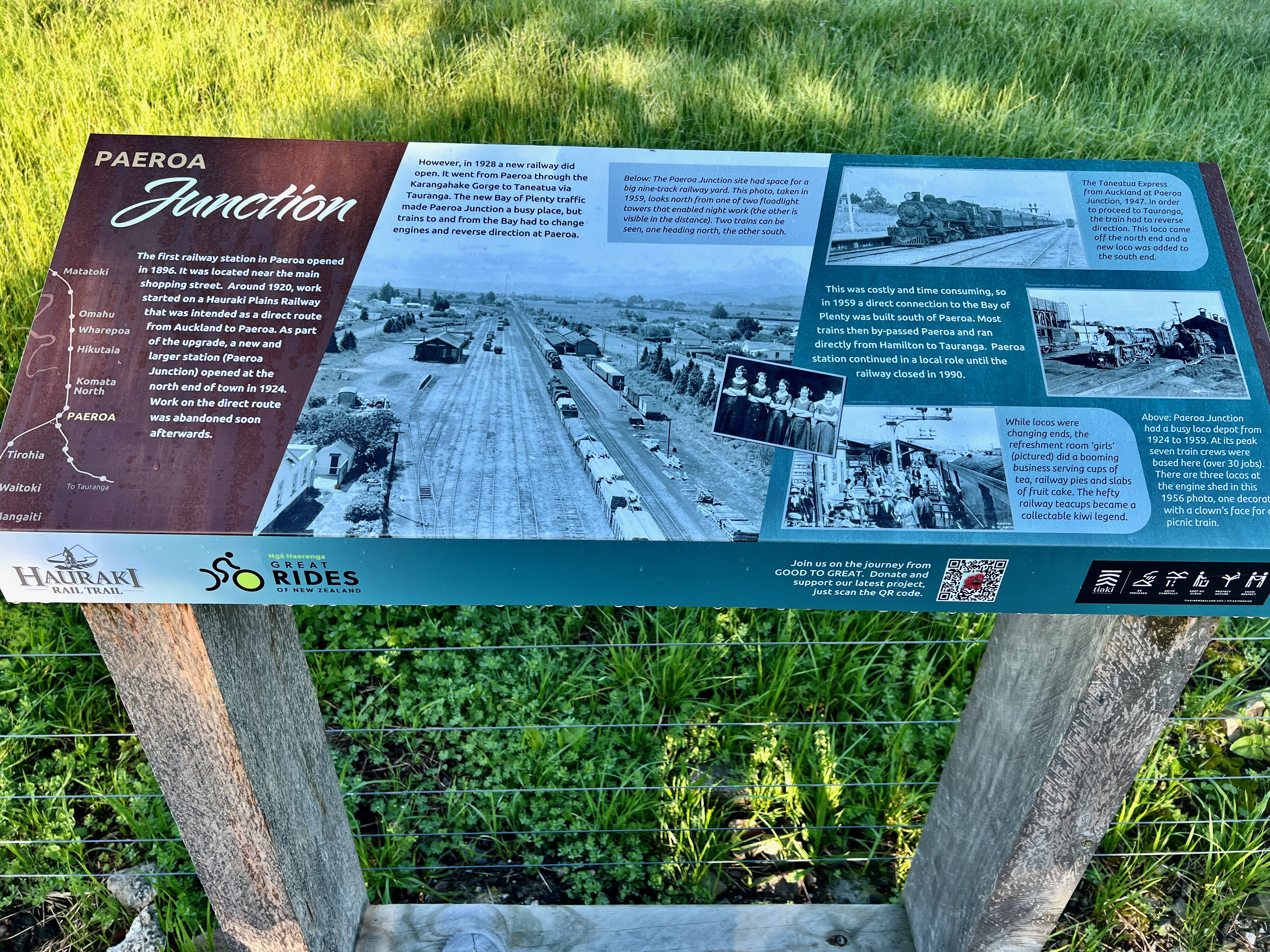
Paeroa 1925 station

The first station was opened on 20 December 1895 by the local MP and Railways Minister, Alfred Cadman, when the line was extended 14 miles (23 kilometres) from Te Aroha. It was at the north end of the main street, between Belmont Road and Railway Street. A coal shed and telephone office were added in 1896, when the special station also had a platform, cart approach, 40 ft (12 m) x 30 ft (9.1 m) goods shed, loading bank, cattle yards, engine turntable and shed, stationmaster's house, urinals and a passing loop for 44 wagons. The station was improved in 1897, including access to a refreshment room, gas lighting in 1899 and a bookstall in 1910. A new turntable in 1900 allowed use of J Class engines.

Ohinemuri County Council asked for the name to be changed from Ohinemuri to Paeroa, which was done on 1 March 1896.

Paeroa remained a terminus until 19 December 1898, when the line was extended to Thames North. It also became busier from 17 August 1903, when the line to Waihi opened to goods and from 5 September, when passengers could travel to Waihi.

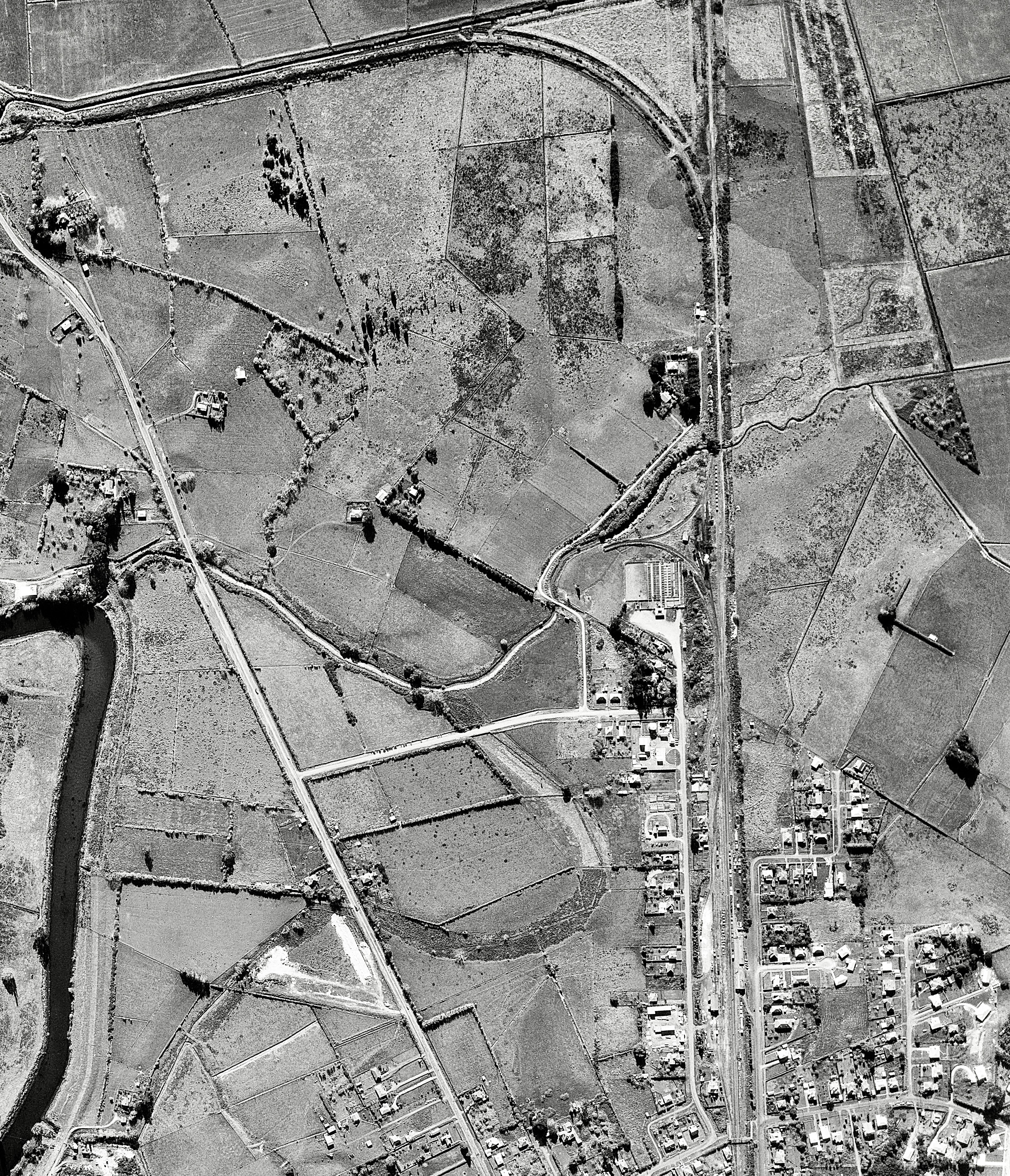
Paeroa's 1925 station in 1963, showing the engine turning triangle and the junction to Pokeno

In 1926, after the station closed, a 1908 band rotunda was moved to the railway reserve, where it remains.

== Railway wharf ==
The wharves on the Ohinemuri River upstream of the railway bridge had restricted access once the bridge was built. A railway wharf opened just downstream of the bridge at the same time as the station, but charges were set at a level to encourage use of the railway, rather than the sea route from Auckland. Therefore the wharf had limited use, with trade moving to the Junction Wharf, further downstream, where a horse-drawn tramway ran from 1 September 1896 to March 1897, using rolling stock from the Grahamstown and Tararu Tramway. On 11 May 1896 the tramway applied for permission to cross the railway, but it seems not to have been given. Similarly, a Ohinemuri County Council request for control of the railway wharf was refused. By 1909 silt from mine tailings had made the river hard to navigate and the wharf wasn't used after 1916, when the rail connection was lifted to avoid changes needed to accommodate a new flood protection stop bank along the river. In 1918 the Railway Wharf was finally closed.

== 1925 station ==
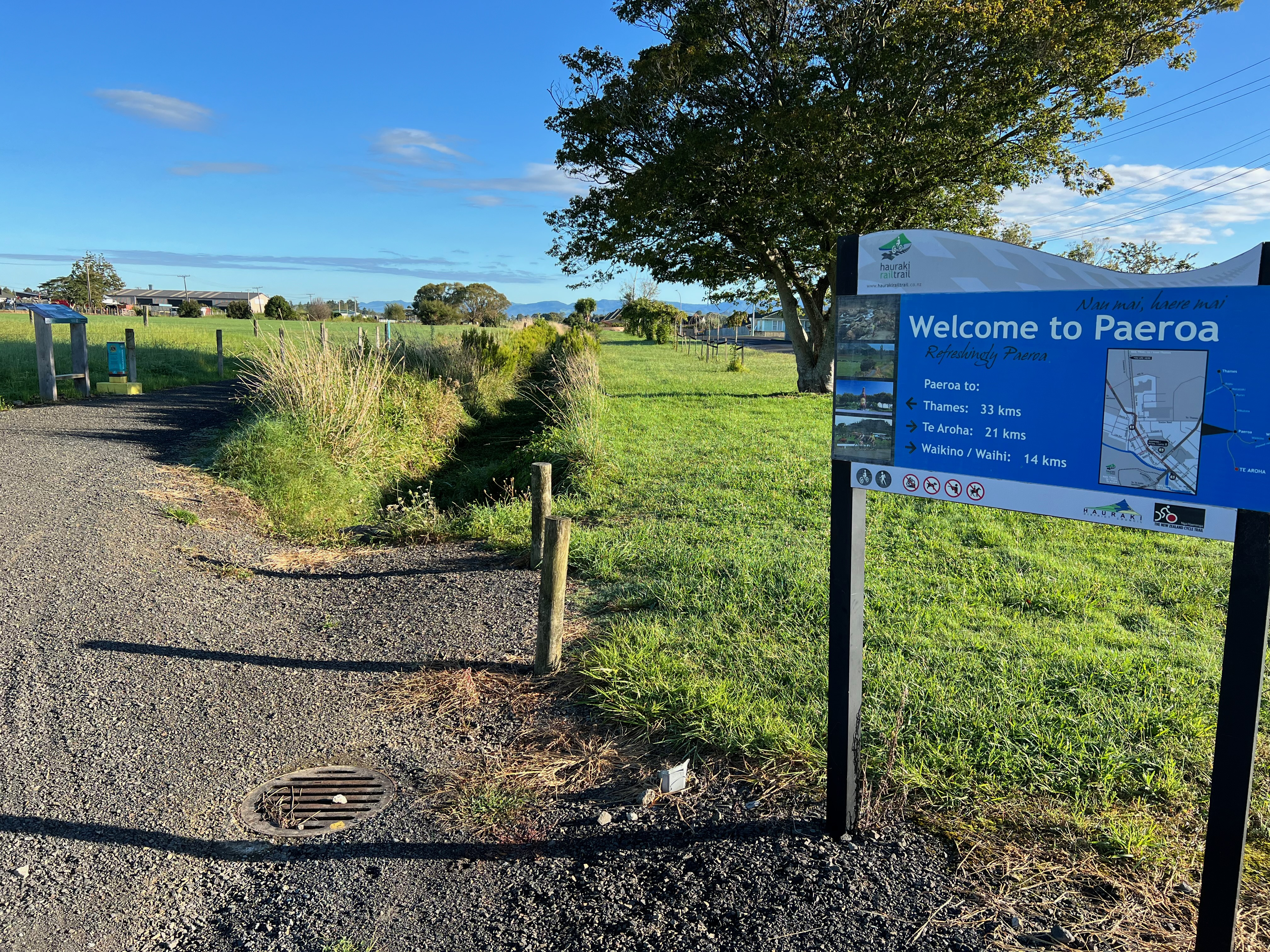
Site of 1925 Paeroa station

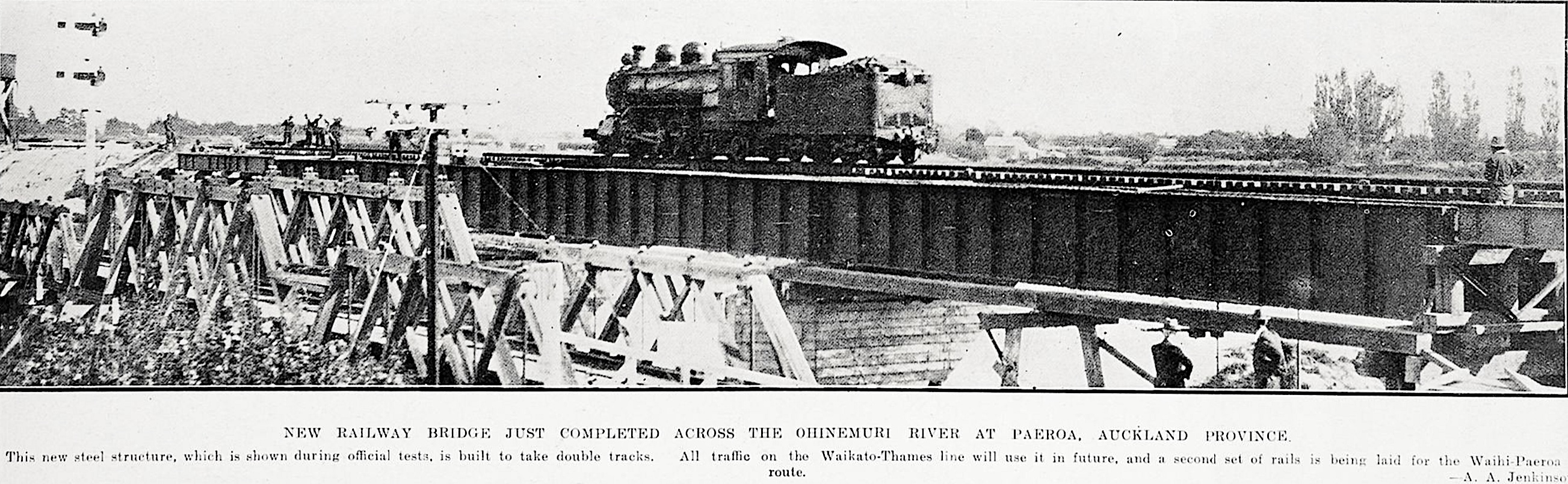
Paeroa rail bridges in 1926

On Tuesday, 1 September 1925 the 1895 station was replaced by one 980 m (0.61 mi) to the north. In 1925/26 the Ohinemuri Bridge was replaced by one 7 ft 6 in (2.29 m) higher, as the flood stop bank was being raised, and the new station was clear of the bank needed to climb to the new bridge level. Most of the 1895 station was in too poor a condition to move, but part of the old platform front was used for a new dock platform. In 1928 improvements included electric lighting, moving the old verandah to the new station, a bicycle shed, a loading bank with a concrete front, new pits in the engine shed and a larger refreshment room, which was used until the station closed to passengers in 1959. Another reason for moving the station to an area where it had room to grow was the congested yard, which was causing delays. There were also private sidings for British Imperial Oil Co (1926) and Vacuum Oil Co (1945). The 55 ft (17 m) turntable was too short for AB class engines and its foundation was sinking, so it was replaced by a reversing triangle, completed by 8 January 1940 at a cost of £2260.

17 railway houses remain on Aorangi Rd, Ainsley Rd and Porritt St. As well as the stationmaster's house, there was a house for a train examiner in 1910 and houses added in 1945 and 1956.

The station closed to passengers on 20 July 1959, and to goods on 28 June 1991 with the closing of the Thames Branch.

The station building was then moved to Waikino, for use as a combined western terminus for Goldfields Railway and as a shop/cafe for Waikino.

== Paeroa–Pokeno Line ==
In 1938 a temporary office at Paeroa, costing £377 14s 3d, was added for the building of the Paeroa–Pokeno Line. A request for a link was made in 1905 and a route was surveyed in 1926. Proposals were also made to shorten the route by a further 12 mi (19 km), by starting it at Manurewa and serving Hunua. Work started in 1938 on the 42 mi 69 ch (69.0 km) line, which would have shortened the distance from Auckland to towns on the ECMT by 45 mi 69 ch (73.8 km). In March 1937 the Kerepeehi Farmers' Union supported construction of the Paeroa to Pokeno link.

Minister of Public Works, Bob Semple, turned the first sod on 27 January 1938 at Paeroa and about 32 mi (51 km) of the 42 mi (68 km) line had been started when work was abandoned in 1940. Work was still making slow progress in 1950, when a paragraph in the Ministry of Works annual report said 20 private crossings had been formed and metaled and 456 ft (139 m) of culverts installed. In 1954 it was noted the major cost would be a £3100, 30 ft (9.1 m) bridge across the Waihou, the abutments already being in place. Most of the work was still in place in the 1960s.

The Pokeno link was to be the first part of the East Coast Main Trunk Railway. With the opening of the Kaimai Tunnel in 1979, the Paeroa to Katikati section of the East Coast Main Trunk was closed.

== 1932 station ==
From 11 October 1932 Paeroa Township was on the site of the old station, as a stopping place for trains towards Waihi, to allow more convenient access to the town centre. After Mackaytown closed on 28 July 1940 its shelter shed was resited on 3 October to Township station. When the station closed in 1959, the shed was again moved, to Borrell Road, further along the line, near Te Puna.

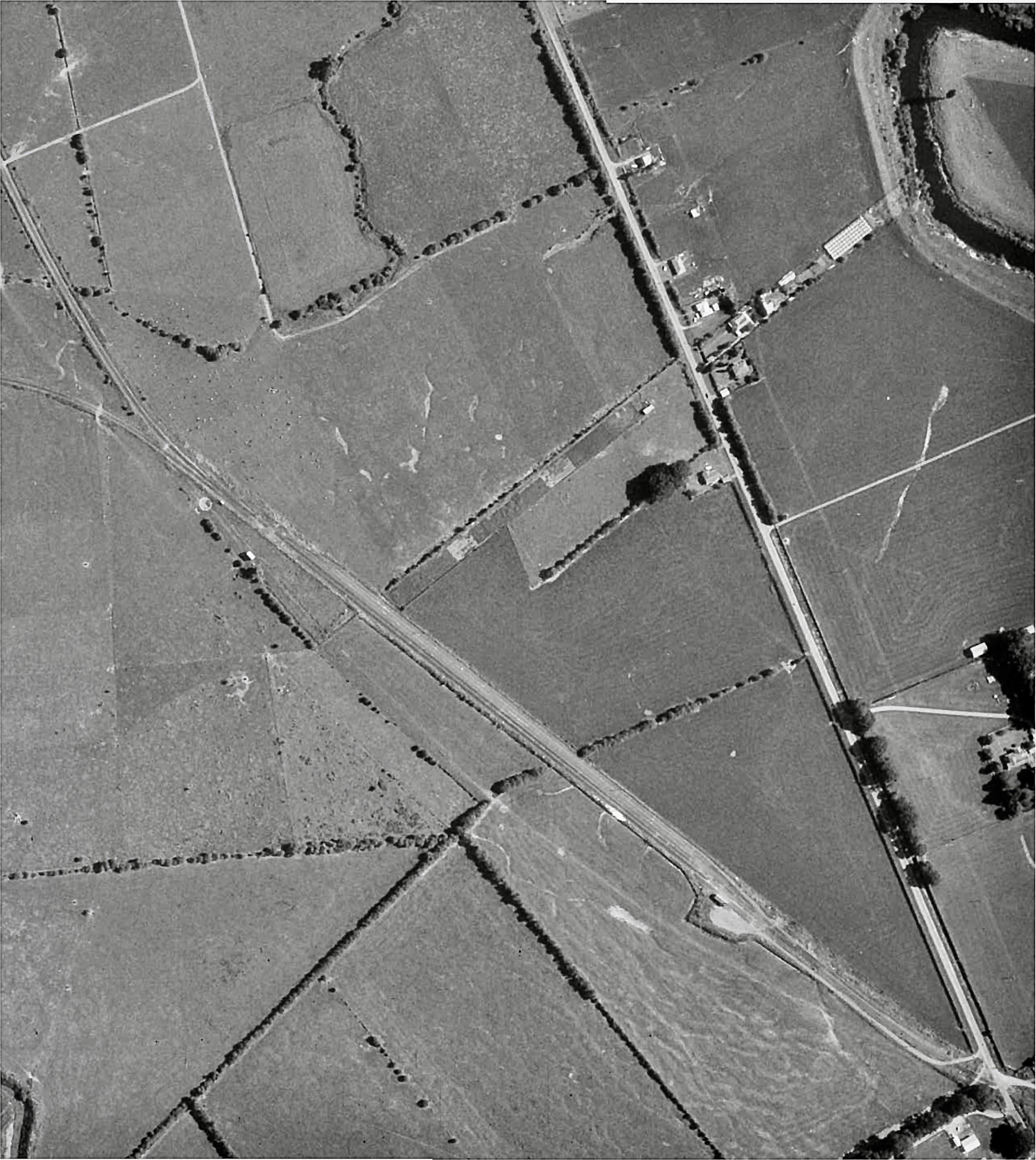
Paeroa South in 1975, between the triangle and Rotokohu Road

== 1959 station ==
Paeroa South, at the eastern end of the triangle on Rotokohu Road, opened on 20 July 1959 and was served by railcars until closure on 11 March 1979.

== Hauraki Rail Trail ==
Both the Thames Branch and ECMT through Paeroa are now part of the Hauraki Rail Trail cycle route, though the railway bridge over the Ohinemuri River has been removed and the Trail uses a footbridge alongside the SH26 bridge.

== See also ==
- Paeroa-Pokeno Line
- Pokeno railway station
- Taneatua Express
