= Rico Resources =

Australian mining corporation

- Company type: Public
- Industry: Mining
- Key people: Imants Kins (Executive Chairman); McAndrew Rudisill (Executive Director)
- Products: Iron ore
- Website: ricoresources.com.au

Rico Resources is an Australian mining corporation. It is publicly listed on the Australian Securities Exchange.

== Overview ==
The company was formerly known as E-Com Multi. It is headquartered in Nedlands, a suburb of Perth in Western Australia.

It is active in the Pilbara of Western Australia, especially near the Ashburton. It focuses on iron ore. In February 2011, it purchased the Wonmunna and Uaroo iron-ore projects from Talisman Mining.

It uses Evercore Partners (NYSE: EVR) as an investment adviser.

== Board of directors ==
- Imants Kins (Executive Chairman).
- McAndrew Rudisill (Executive Director).
- Nathan Featherby (Director).
- Peter Schultz (Director).
