= Waitawheta River =

Coordinates: 37.453398°S 175.753441°E

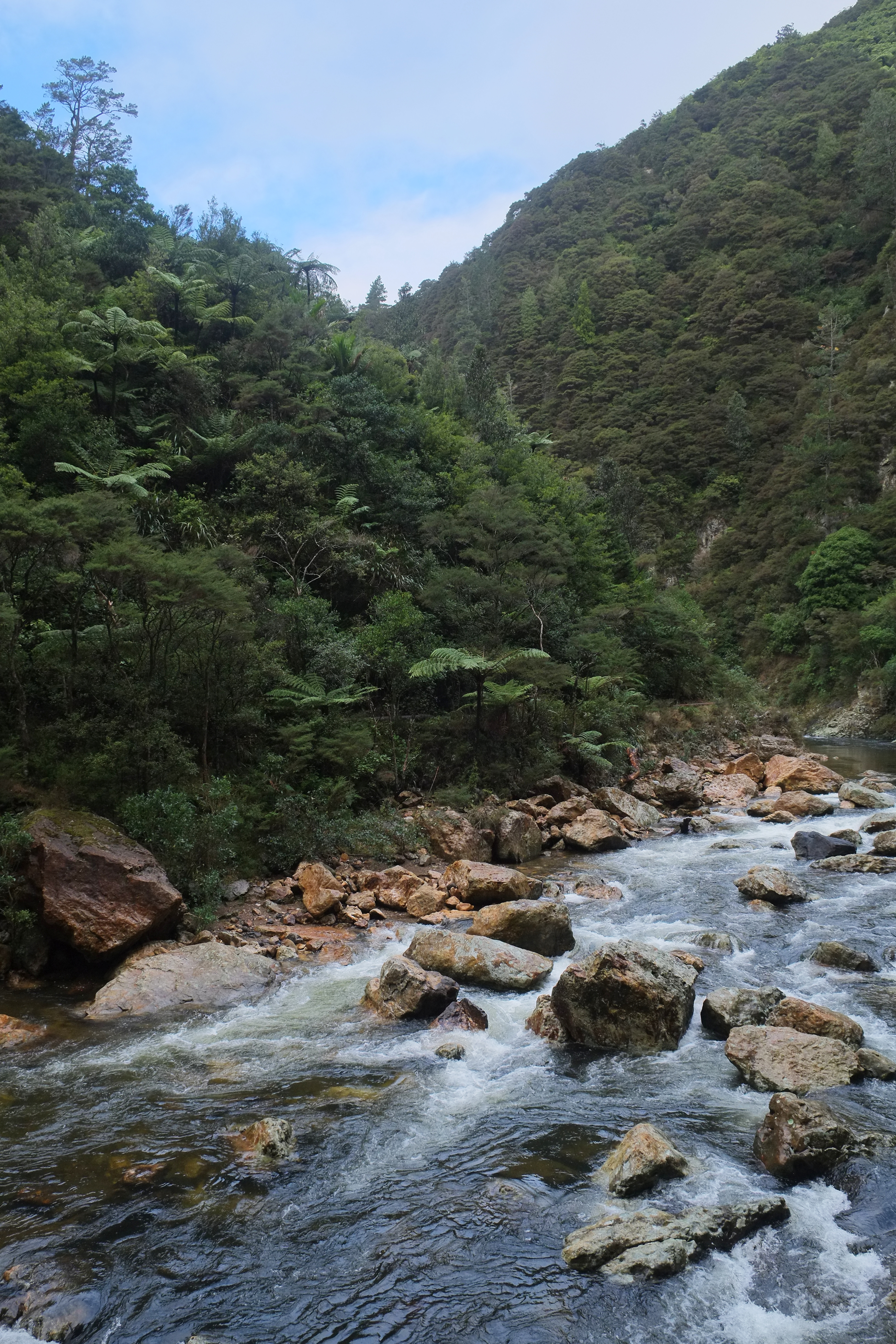
- Waitawheta River at Waitawheta Gorge

Location
- Country: New Zealand

Physical characteristics
- Source
  - location: Kaimai Range
- Mouth
  - location: Ohinemuri River
  - elevation: 38 metres (125 ft)
- Length: 17 kilometres (11 mi)

The Waitawheta River is a river of the Waikato Region of New Zealand's North Island. It flows from a point south-east of Mount Te Aroha in the Kaimai Range to the Karangahake Gorge at the foot of the Coromandel Peninsula to reach the Ohinemuri River at Karangahake, five kilometres east of Paeroa.

After skirting the small settlement of Waitawheta, the river flows through the increasingly narrow Waitawheta Gorge before reaching the Karangahake Gorge. From the Karangahake end, several spectacular walks lead into the gorge - the "Windows Walk" through mining tunnels in the cliff face high above the river, the Crown Tramway Track (partly carved into the rock), and the Crown Track (also referred to as the Waitawheta Pipeline Walk), which leads further into the gorge and to the Dickey Flat campsite. The Dickey Flat campsite is also accessible via Dickey Flat Road.

== Mining ==
The confluence of the Waitawheta River and the Ohinemuri River used to be the centre of the gold mining industry in the Karangahake Gorge area, with the water of the Waitawheta River used for powering stamping batteries. Tailings from the Talisman Mine in the Waitawheta Gorge were tipped out into the gorge via windows at the ends of the mining tunnels. These tunnels and windows are now partly accessible via the Windows Walk, as is the Woodstock Underground Pumphouse on the river's true left and further into the gorge. Remnants of the mining tram tracks are still visible in many places, while only the foundations of the stamping battery buildings remain. At the height of the mining activity around the start of the 1900s, the Talisman mining operation included 50 stampers and buildings on both sides of the Waitawheta Gorge.

== Geology ==
The whole basin is within the Coromandel Volcanic Zone. The river runs mainly over Pliocene rocks, rising on the Kaimai Subgroup of andesite and dacite intrusions, lava flows, breccias and ignimbrite, then through some of the lake deposited Romanga Formation, before reaching the slightly older Waiwawa Subgroup, composed of rocks similar to the Kaimai, but often with mineral-rich hydrothermal alteration.

Waitawheta Quarry (east of the river, near the bush boundary) was, in 2008, producing over 100,000 tonnes a year of andesite for aggregate.

In 2017 there were protests against New Talisman Gold Mines' plans for mining on the Talisman site at Karangahake.

== Wildlife ==
A 2015 survey, on the edge of the bush, found Potamopyrgus, Shortfin and Longfin eels, Common bully, Banded kokopu, Brown trout and Koura, with a 134.2 'excellent' MCI score. Just prior to that, efforts had been made to reduce goat numbers. A 1924 report said that a shag colony near the headwaters had been destroyed by sawmill workers, wanting to increase trout numbers.

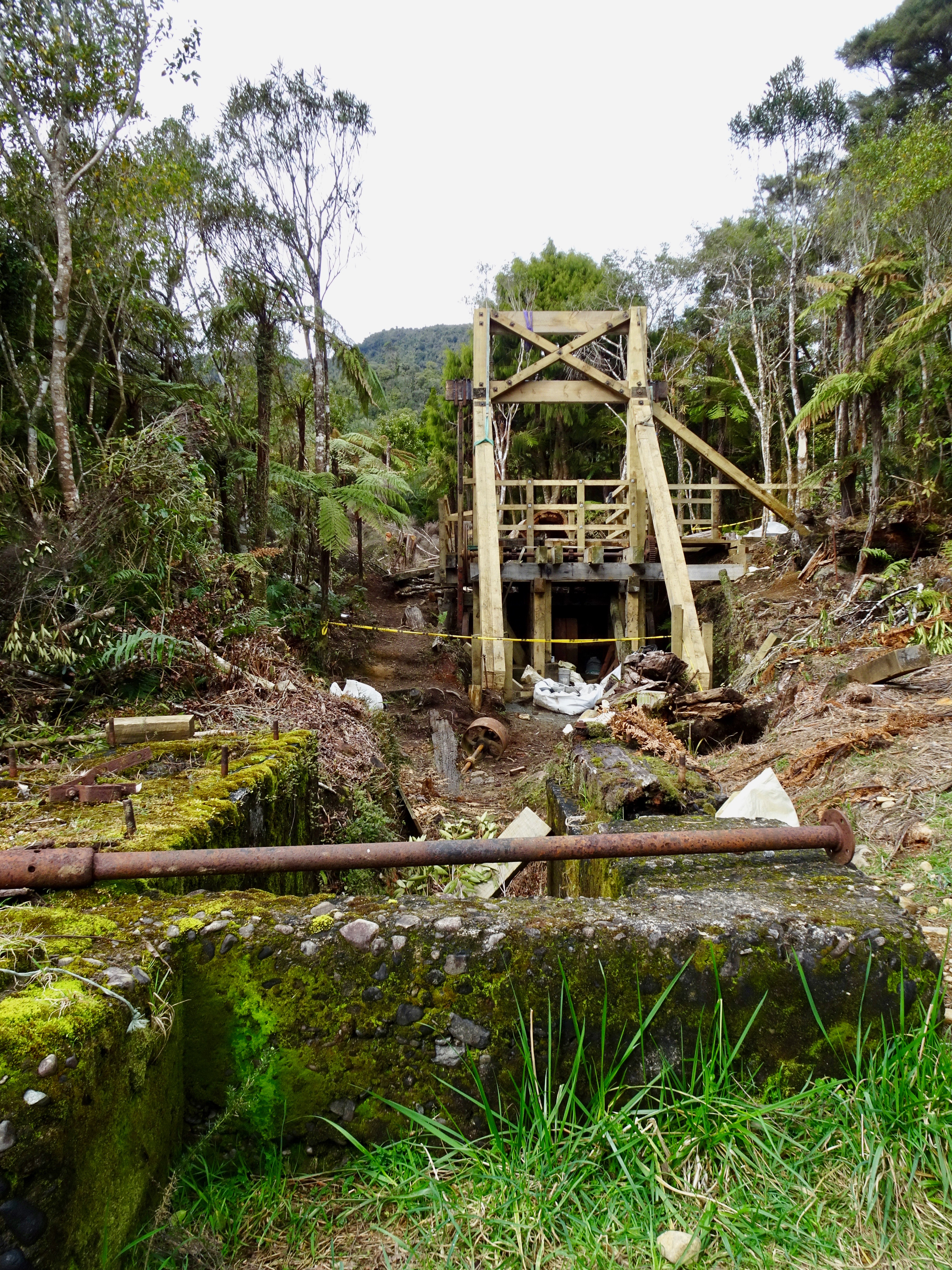
1923 sawmill being restored in 2017

== Logging ==
The lower part of the valley was exploited for gold, the upper part for timber. From 1898 to 1928 the Waihi Gold Mining Co, then the Kauri Timber Co, and, finally, the Waitawheta Sawmilling Co, from 1923, used a 19 km (12 mi), 825 mm (2.707 ft; 32.5 in) gauge (or 5 ft 3 in (1,600 mm)) tramway to the East Coast Main Trunk near Owharoa, to remove 9 million feet (rather more than 2,000 trees) of mostly kauri logs. Milling ended in 1928 when nearly all the trees had been removed and the tramway was then dismantled. Since 2006, most of the 8 bridges over the river have been replaced by suspension bridges for walkers along the remaining 14 km upper part of the tramway. Waitawheta Hut was moved in 2004 to the site of the Waitawheta Sawmill, just above the Toilet Bowl waterfall.

The 1913 Horahora to Waihi 50kV power line also passed through the valley. It was removed for scrap during World War 2.

== See also ==
- List of rivers of New Zealand
- Karangahake Gorge
