= Karangahake Gorge =

Gorge in New Zealand

Coordinates: 37.423676°S 175.725514°E

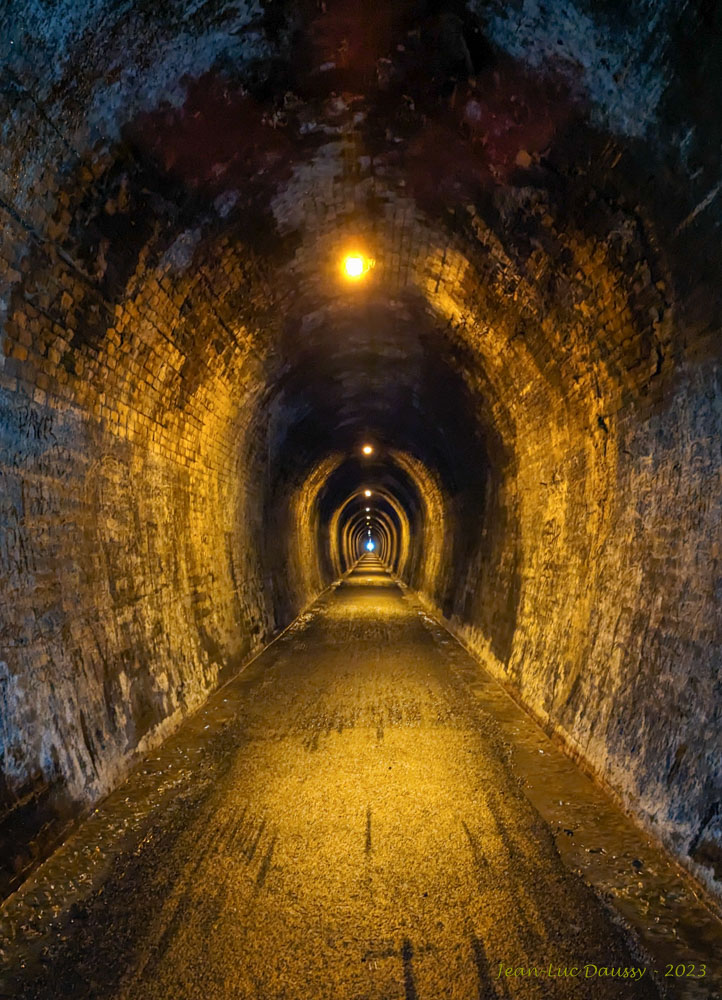
Karangake Tunnel (more than 1 km long)

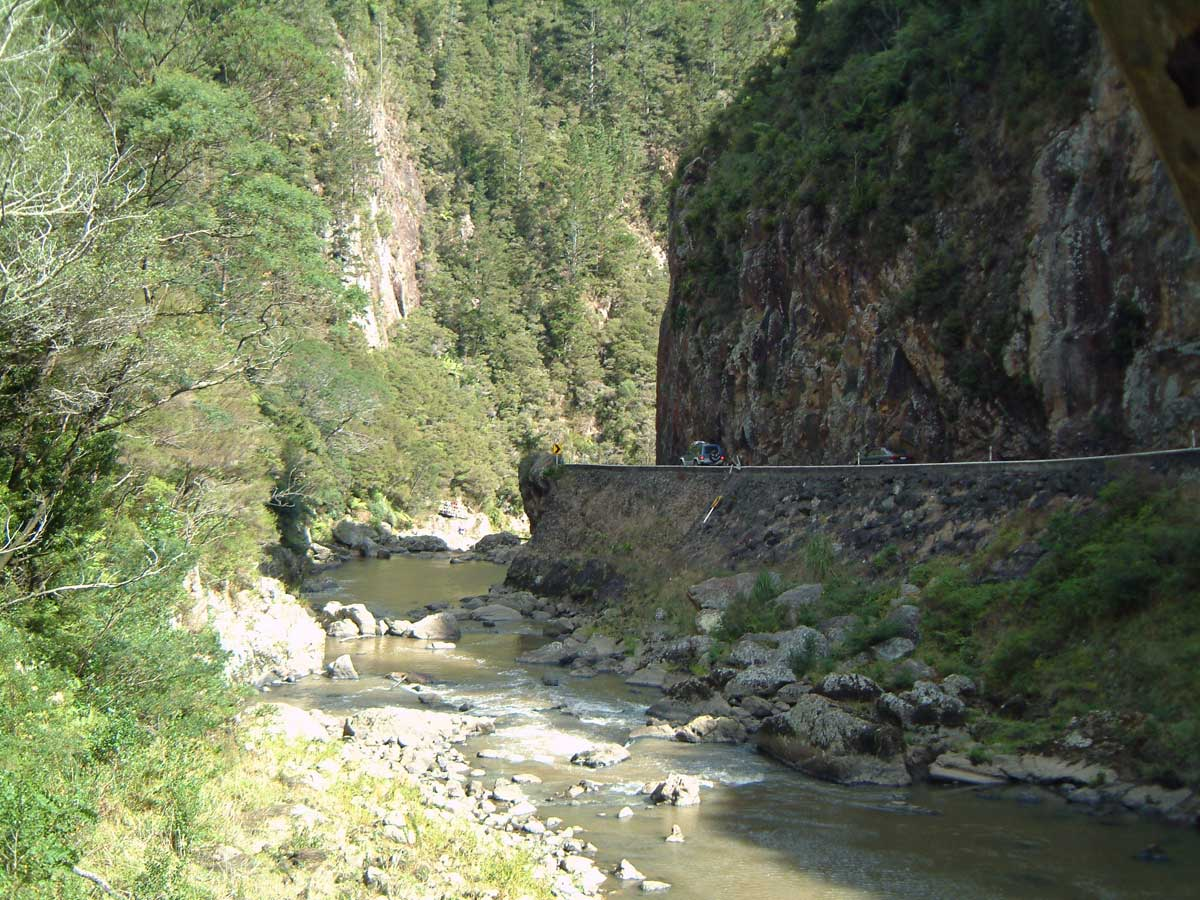
State Highway 2 through the gorge near Karangahake

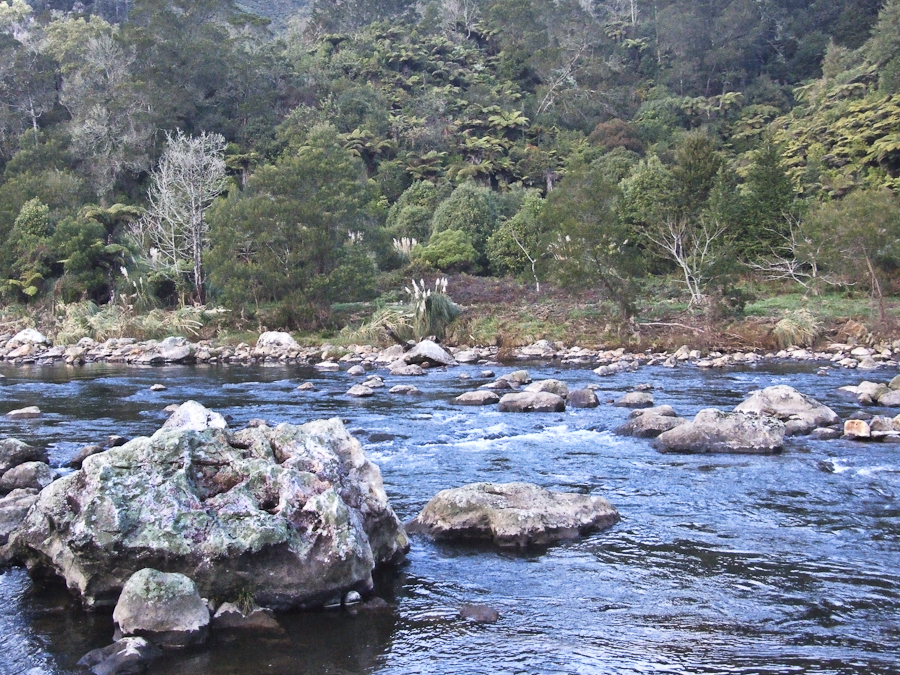
The gorge near Waihi

The Karangahake Gorge lies between the Coromandel and Kaimai ranges, at the southern end of the Coromandel Peninsula in New Zealand's North Island. A sharply winding canyon, it was formed by the Ohinemuri River. State Highway 2 passes through this gorge between the towns of Paeroa, Waikino and Waihi. This road is the main link between the Waikato region and the Bay of Plenty.

The East Coast Main Trunk Railway used to run through the gorge until it was bypassed by the Kaimai Deviation - and the Karangahake Gorge section is now a combined walkway and cycleway, part of the Hauraki Rail Trail.

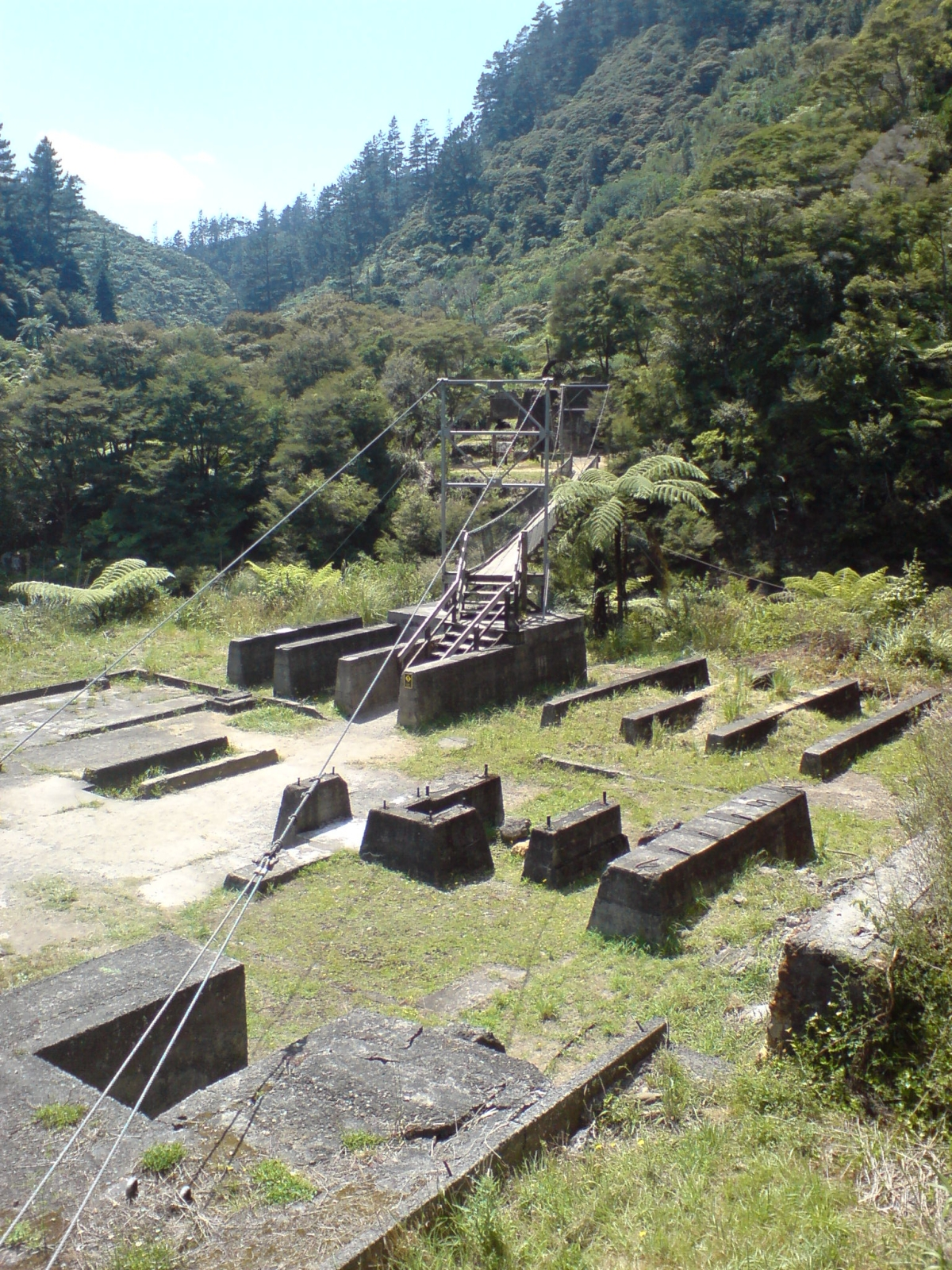
Remains of Woodstock battery

There are also several walks and tracks starting at the Karangahake Reserve car park and picnic area; ranging from 30 minutes to over 2 hours.

== Mining ==
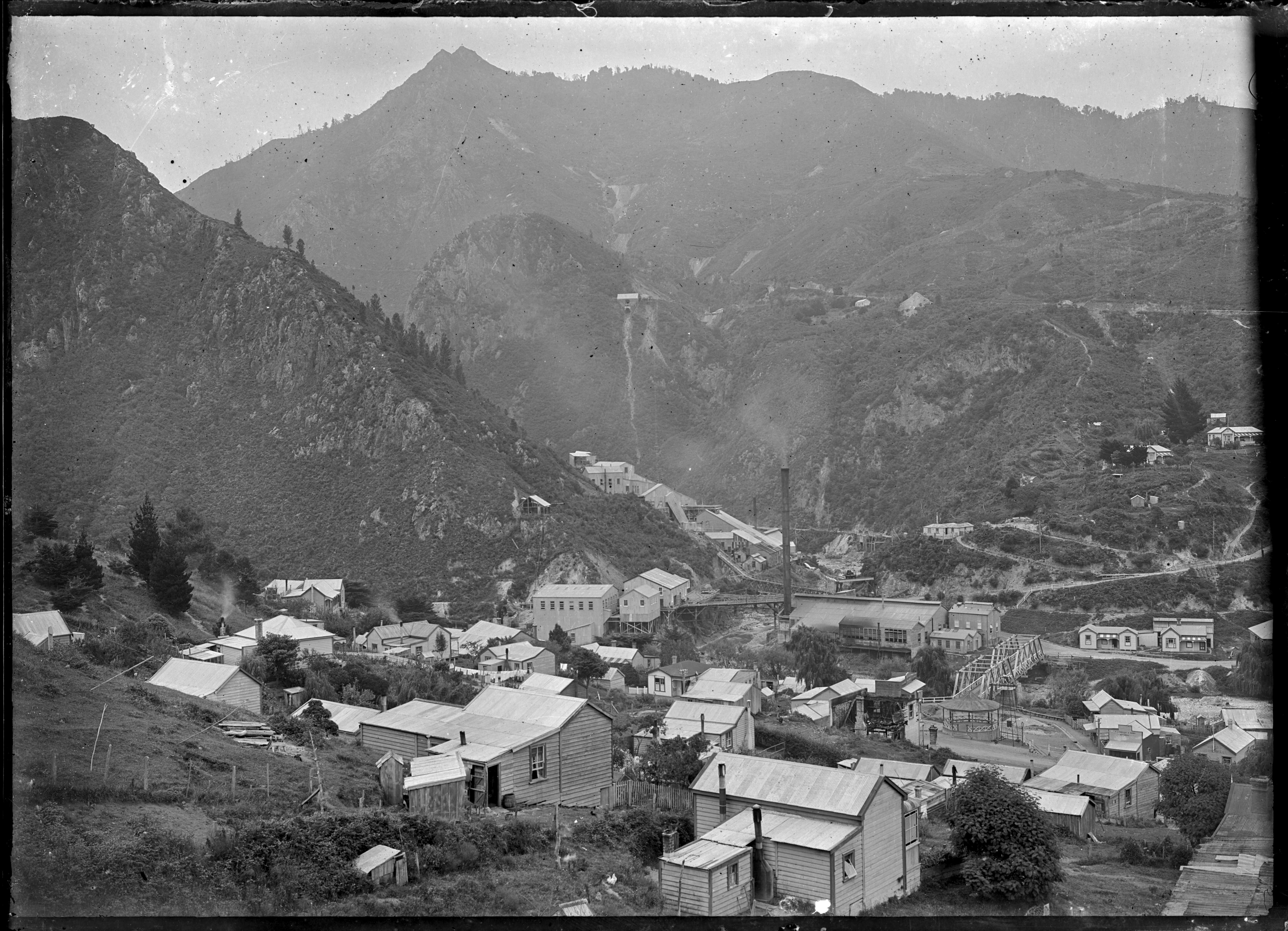
"Settlement of Karangahake" including gold mining buildings in centre, circa 1916

The area has a strong connection to mining, and even in the 2010s, a number of companies have been prospecting and mining the area, though with much less visible and invasive methods than were used historically.

The Talisman, Crown and Woodstock stamping battery remains at the lower end of the gorge and are some of the most significant reminders of the time. Their location at the confluence of the Waitawheta River and the Ohinemuri River was chosen to make use of the available water power of the rivers. Mining at the batteries occurred roughly from the 1880s to 1950s, with the most productive years around the turn of the century, when the area produced 60 percent of the total gold from New Zealand. The batteries used to crush the ore from the extensive tunnels mined through the steep local mountainsides of the Waitawheta Gorge, with the Victoria Battery, one of the largest and most advanced at the time.

== Walks ==
At Karangahake, several walks and tracks ranging from 30 minutes to over 2 hours start at the Karangahake Reserve car park and picnic area. One of the most spectacular walks in the area is the "Windows Walk", a loop walk that leads through the old gold mining tunnels of the Talisman Mine, crosses the Waitawheta River over a suspension bridge, and joins the Crown Tramway Track back along the cliffs of the Waitawheta Gorge. The path follows the route of a bush tramway and passes by "windows" in the cliff face at the end of mining tunnels, which were used to tip tailings down into the Waitawheta Gorge. Two of the mining tunnels, which are about 2 metres (7 ft) tall and wide, are safe to enter. They end abruptly after about 50 metres (164 ft) and are home to glowworms and cave weta.

The Woodstock Underground Pumphouse in the Waitawheta Gorge is also still accessible via a short detour from the Crown Tramway Track.

The East Coast Main Trunk Railway used to run through the gorge until it was bypassed by the Kaimai Deviation. The Karangahake Gorge section of the line, including a 1100-metre tunnel, is now a combined walkway and cycleway, part of the Hauraki Rail Trail, and together with the natural sights of the gorge, makes it into a well-visited local tourist attraction. The railhead at the Waikino end of the gorge still exists, preserved as part of the Goldfields Railway to Waihi.

== See also ==
- Kaimai Range
