= Pahoia =

Settlement in the Bay of Plenty, New Zealand

- Rural community
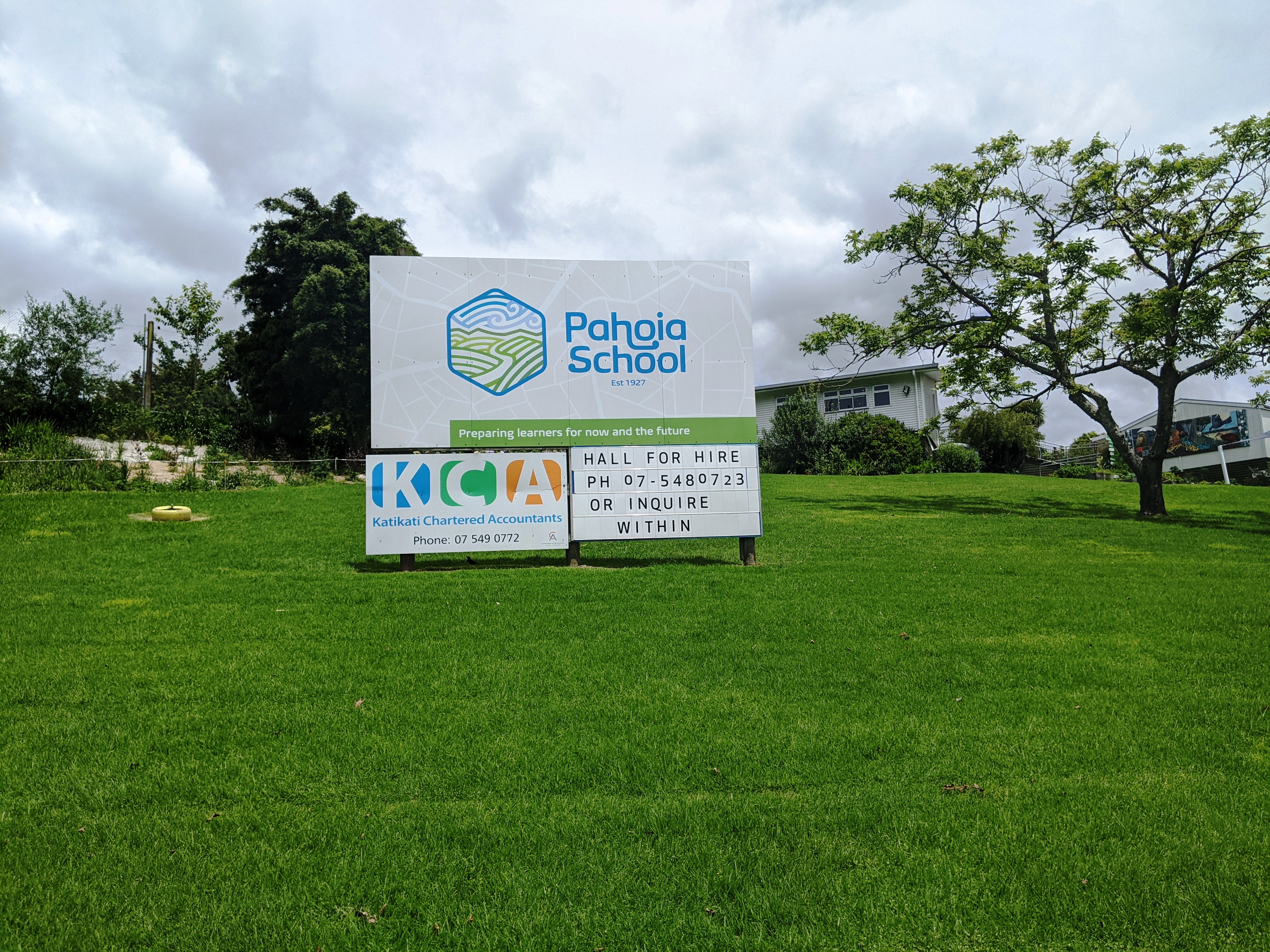
- Pahoia School
- Interactive map of Pahoia
- Coordinates: 37.654°S 175.996°E
- Country: New Zealand
- Region: Bay of Plenty
- Territorial authority: Western Bay of Plenty District
- Ward: Katikati-Waihi Beach Ward
- Electorates: Coromandel; Waiariki (Māori)

Government
  - Territorial Authority: Western Bay of Plenty District Council
  - Regional council: Bay of Plenty Regional Council
  - Mayor of Western Bay of Plenty: James Denyer
  - Coromandel MP: Scott Simpson
  - Waiariki MP: Rawiri Waititi

Area
  - Total: 5.30 km^{2} (2.05 sq mi)

Population (2023)
  - Total: 318
  - Density: 60.0/km^{2} (155/sq mi)
- Postcode(s): 3172

Pahoia is a waterfront settlement in the Western Bay of Plenty District and Bay of Plenty Region of New Zealand's North Island.

It includes a stretch of State Highway 2 that is a common crash site, due to windy roads, high speeds and heavy traffic. The New Zealand Transport Agency has reduced speeds along the road following a series of crashes, including introducing a school speed zone outside Pahoia School.

Pahoia Domain, a beach and park, is the base for a mud challenge fundraiser for Tauranga Boys' College rugby teams. The course includes 6km of mudflats along the Pahoia waterfront.

== Demographics ==
Pahoia locality covers 5.30 km^{2} (2.05 sq mi). It is part of the larger Pahoia statistical area.

Historical population for Pahoia locality
Year	Pop.	±% p.a.
2006	258	—
2013	240	−1.03%
2018	288	+3.71%
2023	318	+2.00%

The locality had a population of 318 in the 2023 New Zealand census, an increase of 30 people (10.4%) since the 2018 census, and an increase of 78 people (32.5%) since the 2013 census. There were 147 males and 171 females in 123 dwellings. 1.9% of people identified as LGBTIQ+. There were 66 people (20.8%) aged under 15 years, 27 (8.5%) aged 15 to 29, 147 (46.2%) aged 30 to 64, and 75 (23.6%) aged 65 or older.

People could identify as more than one ethnicity. The results were 96.2% European (Pākehā), 12.3% Māori, 2.8% Pasifika, 0.9% Asian, and 3.8% other, which includes people giving their ethnicity as "New Zealander". English was spoken by 97.2%, Māori by 0.9%, and other languages by 6.6%. No language could be spoken by 2.8% (e.g. too young to talk). New Zealand Sign Language was known by 0.9%. The percentage of people born overseas was 16.0, compared with 28.8% nationally.

Religious affiliations were 25.5% Christian, 0.9% Hindu, 0.9% Māori religious beliefs, and 0.9% other religions. People who answered that they had no religion were 63.2%, and 8.5% of people did not answer the census question.

Of those at least 15 years old, 66 (26.2%) people had a bachelor's or higher degree, 141 (56.0%) had a post-high school certificate or diploma, and 36 (14.3%) people exclusively held high school qualifications. 39 people (15.5%) earned over $100,000 compared to 12.1% nationally. The employment status of those at least 15 was 126 (50.0%) full-time and 54 (21.4%) part-time.

=== Pahoia statistical area ===
Pahoia statistical area covers 112.79 km^{2} (43.55 sq mi) and had an estimated population of 3,420 as of June 2025, with a population density of 30 people per km^{2}.

Historical population for the statistical area
Year	Pop.	±% p.a.
2006	2,640	—
2013	2,667	+0.15%
2018	3,195	+3.68%
2023	3,297	+0.63%

Pahoia statistical area had a population of 3,297 in the 2023 New Zealand census, an increase of 102 people (3.2%) since the 2018 census, and an increase of 630 people (23.6%) since the 2013 census. There were 1,647 males, 1,638 females, and 9 people of other genders in 1,143 dwellings. 1.5% of people identified as LGBTIQ+. There were 621 people (18.8%) aged under 15 years, 432 (13.1%) aged 15 to 29, 1,671 (50.7%) aged 30 to 64, and 579 (17.6%) aged 65 or older.

People could identify as more than one ethnicity. The results were 92.1% European (Pākehā); 13.0% Māori; 2.0% Pasifika; 2.3% Asian; 0.8% Middle Eastern, Latin American and African New Zealanders (MELAA); and 3.6% other, which includes people giving their ethnicity as "New Zealander". English was spoken by 97.8%, Māori by 2.5%, Samoan by 0.1%, and other languages by 7.4%. No language could be spoken by 1.6% (e.g. too young to talk). New Zealand Sign Language was known by 0.3%. The percentage of people born overseas was 18.3, compared with 28.8% nationally.

Religious affiliations were 24.7% Christian, 0.8% Hindu, 0.2% Islam, 0.7% Māori religious beliefs, 0.4% Buddhist, 0.6% New Age, 0.1% Jewish, and 1.2% other religions. People who answered that they had no religion were 61.5%, and 9.9% of people did not answer the census question.

Of those at least 15 years old, 669 (25.0%) people had a bachelor's or higher degree, 1,512 (56.5%) had a post-high school certificate or diploma, and 495 (18.5%) people exclusively held high school qualifications. 378 people (14.1%) earned over $100,000 compared to 12.1% nationally. The employment status of those at least 15 was 1,359 (50.8%) full-time, 510 (19.1%) part-time, and 48 (1.8%) unemployed.

Individual statistical areas
Name	Area (km^{2})	Population	Density (per km^{2})	Dwellings	Median age	Median income
Pahoia West	40.58	1,350	33	486	46.2 years	$43,300
Pahoia East	72.21	1,947	27	657	47.5 years	$41,900
New Zealand					38.1 years	$41,500

== Education ==
Pahoia School is a co-educational state primary school for Year 1 to 6 students, with a roll of 169 as of July 2026. The school opened in 1927. The school holds an annual triathlon.

== Railway station ==
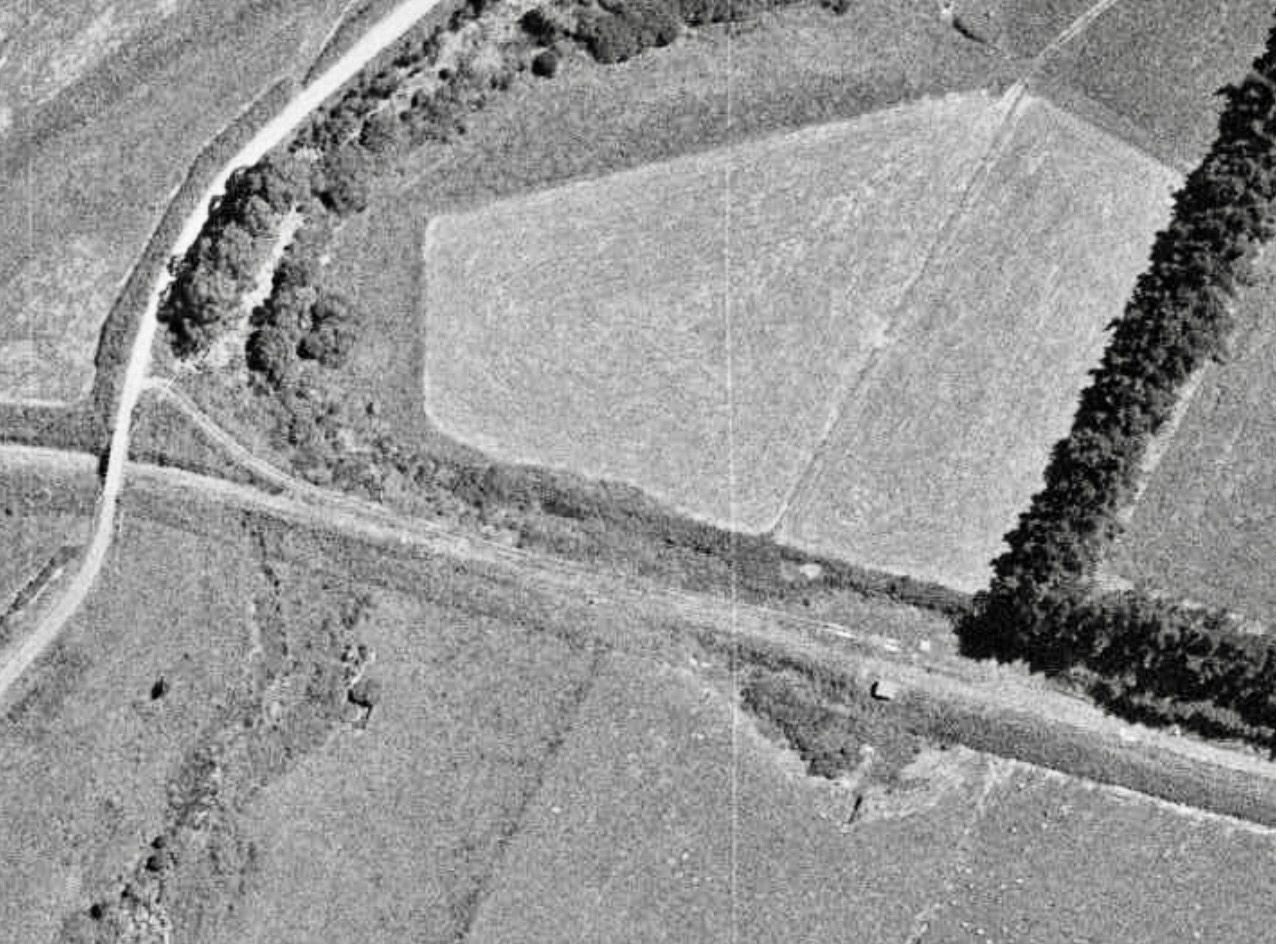
Pahoia in 1959

Pahoia railway station served an area of World War 1 soldier settlers, initially provided with a siding and then a flag station on the East Coast Main Trunk from 28 March 1928 to 31 October 1960 (21 April 1963 for goods), though a special train ran on 29 February 1928 and goods were carried from 5 March. New Zealand Railways (NZR) took over from the Public Works Department (PWD) on 18 June 1928. The station had a shelter shed, cart approach, a 30 ft (9.1 m) by 20 ft (6.1 m) goods shed, cattle and sheep yards, a loading bank and a passing loop for 29 wagons. It also had toilets until they were closed in 1958.

The station was on the 18.5 mi (29.8 km) section of the railway between Tahawai and Te Puna, built by Sir W. G. Armstrong, Whitworth & Co for about £500,000. Due to difficulties in establishing firm foundations for the line and its bridges, it was the last section of the Auckland-Tāneatua line to be completed. It was unusual at the time for contracts to be given to private companies, rather than to PWD, or worker cooperatives. The contractors built a wharf and stacking yard at Mount Maunganui, and landing-stages at several estuaries along the Harbour. They built 100 x 2-man, 13 x 4-man, 66 x 6-man huts, 46 married quarters, 3 cookhouses, 4 bathhouses, 2 recreation-rooms, quarters for field engineers and had two steam-locomotives, six steam-navvies, six petrol-locomotives, two steam pile-drivers, concrete-mixers, launches, punts, motor-lorries and ballast-trucks. Earthworks amounted to 1,229,000 yd^{3} (940,000 m^{3}).

Preceding station	Historical railways	Following station
Apata; Line open, station closed 1.91 km (1.19 mi); Towards Hamilton	East Coast Main Trunk; New Zealand Railways Department	Ōmokoroa; Line open, station closed 3.93 km (2.44 mi); Towards Tāneatua
