= Waitekauri River =

Coordinates: 37°23′S 175°47′E

Location
- Country: New Zealand

Physical characteristics
- Source
  - location: Coromandel Range
- Mouth
  - location: Ohinemuri River
- Length: 14 km (8.7 mi)

The Waitekauri River is a river of the Waikato Region of New Zealand's North Island. It flows south from the Coromandel Range at the foot of the Coromandel Peninsula to reach the Ohinemuri River six kilometres west of Waihi.

== See also ==
- List of rivers of New Zealand
