= Wainui River (Bay of Plenty) =

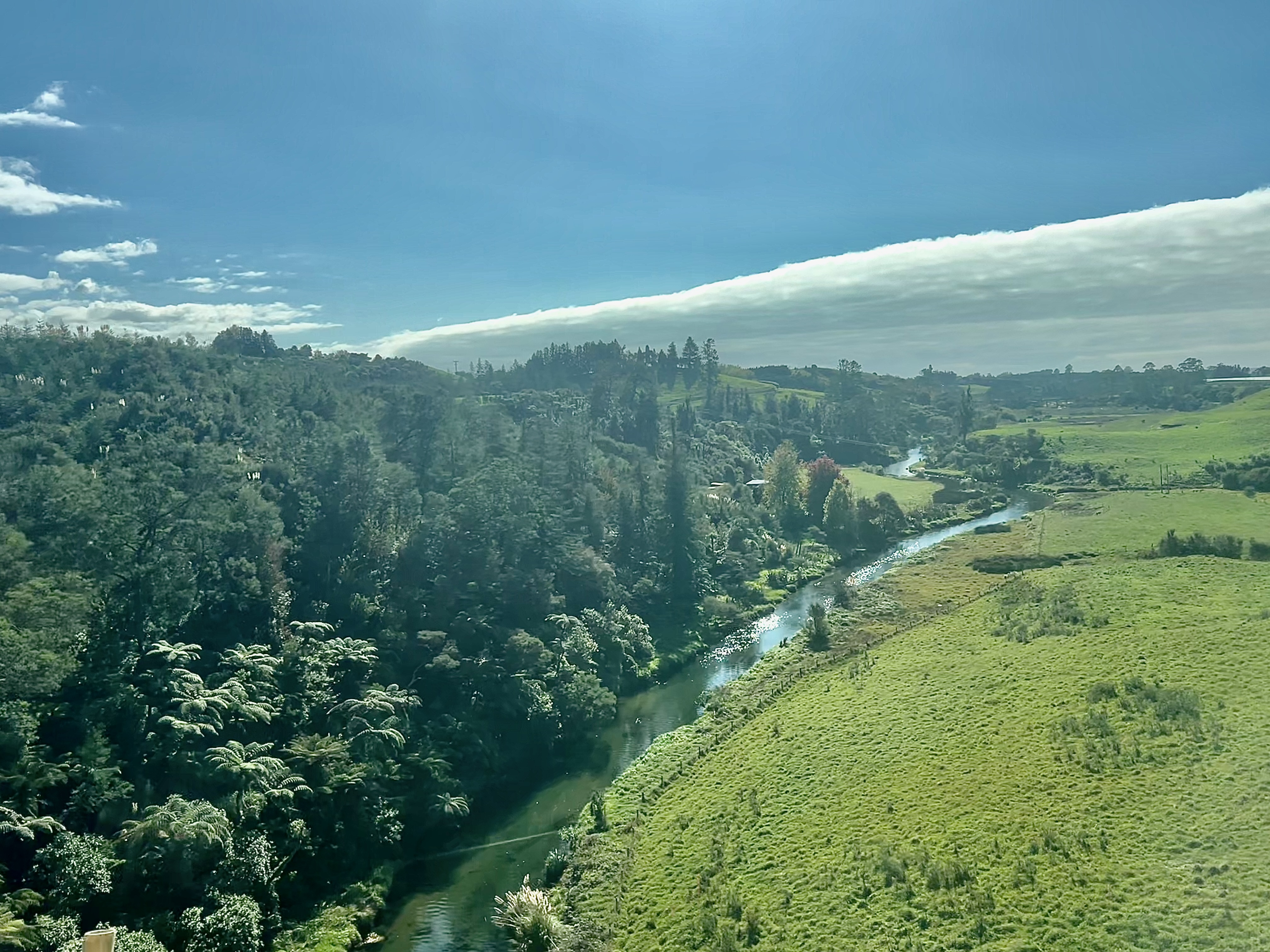
- Wainui River from East Coast railway viaduct

Location
- Country: New Zealand

Physical characteristics
- Source
  - location: Kaimai Range
  - elevation: 551m
- Mouth
  - location: Tauranga Harbour
  - coordinates: 37°37′42″S 175°58′03″E
- Length: 17 km (11 mi)
- Basin size: 5058ha

The Wainui River is a river of the Bay of Plenty Region of New Zealand's North Island. It flows north from the Kaimai Range to reach Tauranga Harbour 10 kilometres (6 mi) south of Katikati. The catchment has 191 km (119 mi) of stream margins. 41% of the catchment remains covered in native bush, but 48% is under pasture and suffers soil erosion.

The river includes 3 waterfalls of up to 10 m (33 ft), which have been kayaked.

The 210 ft (64 m) long former East Coast Main Trunk railway bridge is designated as the limit of the Coastal Marine Area. Downstream, a 3-span 31 m (102 ft) bridge takes SH2 over the river.

The river is also bridged by the current East Coast Main Trunk railway. Bridge 45 was built between 1969 and 1973 and opened with the Kaimai Tunnel on 12 September 1978. It is 227.26 m (745.6 ft) long and 34 m (112 ft) above the river.

== See also ==
- List of rivers of New Zealand
