= Ohinemuri River =

River in New Zealand

Coordinates: 37°23′S 175°39′E

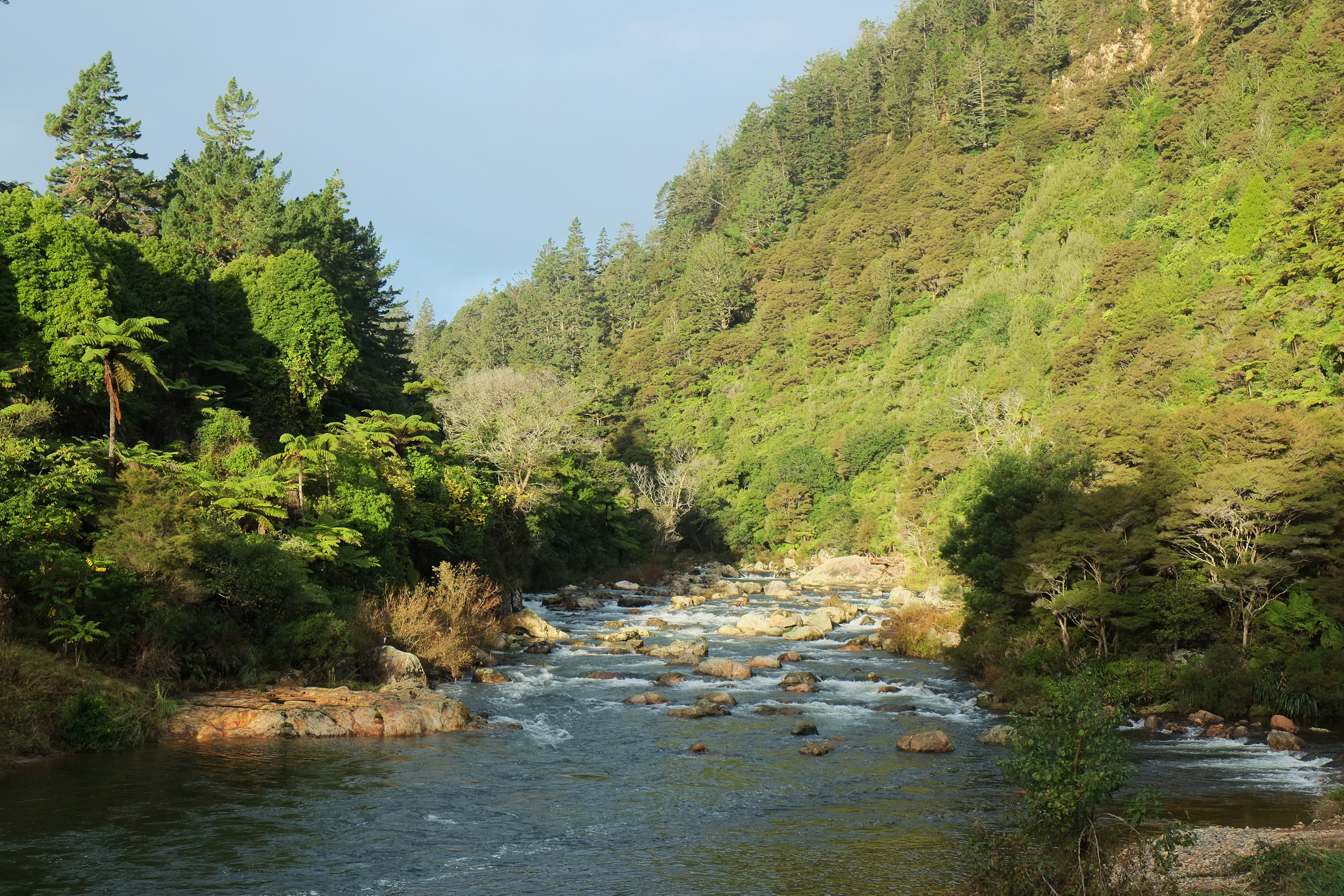
- Ohinemuri River at Karangahake

Location
- Country: New Zealand

Physical characteristics
- Source
  - location: Coromandel Range
- Mouth
  - location: Waihou River
- Length: 28 km (17 mi)

The Ohinemuri River is located in the northern half of New Zealand's North Island, at the base of the Coromandel Peninsula.

The river's source is north-east of the town of Waihi, close to the shore of the Bay of Plenty, but flows west rather than into the bay. It runs through the steep-sided Karangahake Gorge, forming a break between the Coromandel Range and the Kaimai Ranges. After 28 kilometres (17 mi), it joins the Waihou River near the town of Paeroa, 20 kilometres (12 mi) south of the Firth of Thames, into which the Waihou River empties.

== Tributaries ==
- Mataora Stream, running through the Golden Valley from a source only 1.5 km from the Bay of Plenty coastline.
- Mangatoetoe Stream, which bisects the town of Waihi.
- Waitete Stream, originating in the Coromandel Range near Waihi. This stream forms a natural boundary on the north-western side of Waihi and joins the Ohinemuri River immediately after Black Pool Dam.
- Waimata Stream, starting in the Kaimai Ranges near the Athenree Gorge.
- Waitekauri River, with its source deep in the Coromandel ranges, near the Komata goldfields.
- Taieri Stream, originating west of the Pukewera Hill, and the beautiful Owharoa Falls, near the confluence with the Ohinemuri River.
- Waitawheta River, flowing from deep in the Kaimai Ranges, south-east of Mount Te Aroha, and through the Waitawheta Gorge to Karangahake, where it joins Ohinemuri River.

== Public access ==
- From Paeroa, the river can be viewed from or near the Criterion Bridge, at the south end of town.
- State Highway 2 follows the path of the river through Karangahake Gorge most of the way between Paeroa and Waihi.
- The Karangahake Gorge Walkway, Hauraki Rail Trail and the Goldfields Railway follow respective parts of the river. At Karangahake, a car park and picnic area provide good access to the river.

== Gold mines ==
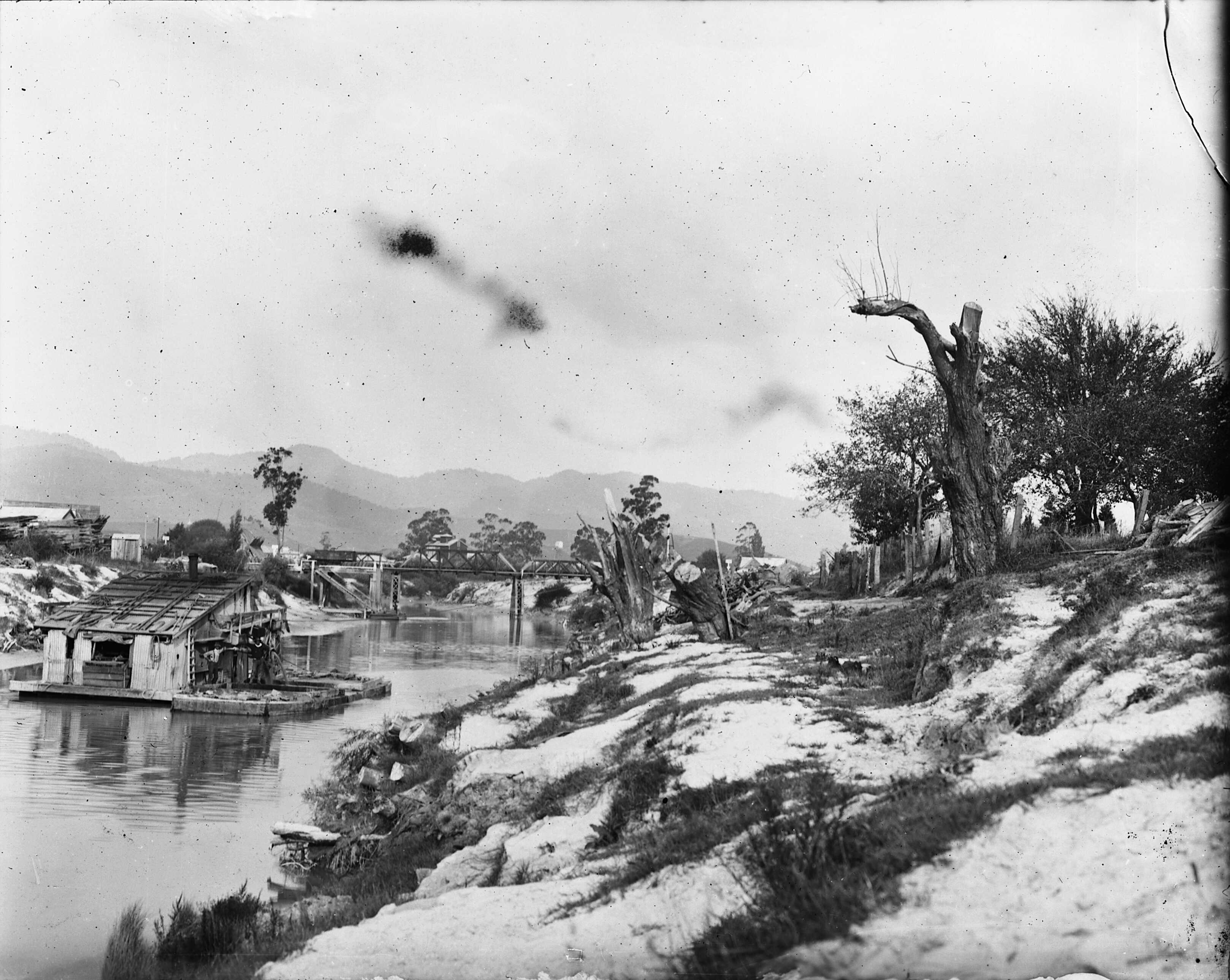
Ohinemuri River, near Paeroa, with a goldmining dredge, ca. 1916

At Karangahake Gorge the remains of the Crown and Talisman gold mines are visible from the Karangahake Gorge Historic walkway. At Waikino the Victoria Battery site has been opened as a public reserve. A railway line followed the river's south bank eastward to Waihi until 1952. This is now part of the Hauraki Rail Trail.

On 23 August 2024, the Ohinemuri River turned bright orange, with an old mining shaft eventually confirmed as the source. Testing is underway as mining waste is often toxic.

== Old towns ==
Several old mining towns are located along the river, including:

- Mackaytown is still extant, although a shadow of its former self.
- Karangahake is still extant and is at the western end of the Karangahake Gorge Walkway, and the northern end of Mt Karangahake Walkway.
- Owharoa is a ghost town 2 km west of Waikino.
- Waikino is still extant and is at the eastern end of the Karangahake Gorge Walkway and the Western end of the Goldfields Railway.

== See also ==
- List of rivers of New Zealand
