= Kaimai Tunnel =

Railway tunnel In New Zealand

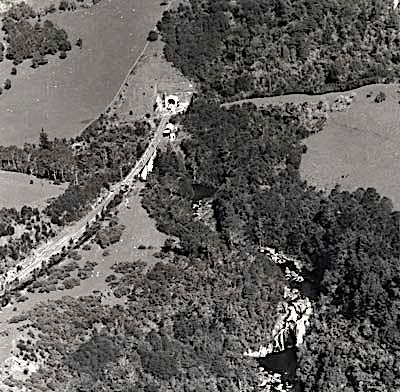
- Kaimai Tunnel eastern portal and the Whatakao Stream bridges in the 1970s
- Interactive map of Kaimai Tunnel

Overview
- Line: East Coast Main Trunk Railway
- Location: Waikato / Bay of Plenty, New Zealand
- Coordinates: West (Waikato) portal: 37.6991°S 175.8462°E; East (Bay of Plenty) portal: 37.6596°S 175.9335°E
- Status: Open
- System: New Zealand Railways Corporation
- Start: Hemopo
- End: Whatakao Stream
- No. of stations: None

Operation
- Opened: 12 September 1978
- Operator: KiwiRail
- Character: Passenger/freight

Technical
- Line length: 8.879 kilometres (5.517 mi)
- No. of tracks: Single
- Track gauge: 3 ft 6 in (1,067 mm)
- Max elevation: 80 metres (260 ft)
- Min elevation: 40 metres (130 ft)

Map

The Kaimai Tunnel is a railway tunnel through the Kaimai Range in the North Island of New Zealand. Since it was opened in 1978, it has held the title of longest tunnel, at 8.879 kilometres (5.517 mi), in New Zealand, assuming this distinction from the previous title holder, the Rimutaka Tunnel. It is part of the Kaimai Deviation, which was constructed to bypass the old route of the East Coast Main Trunk Railway through the Karangahake Gorge (part of which has been preserved as the Goldfields Railway).

== History ==
In the first half of the 20th century, the disadvantages of the East Coast Main Trunk route through the Karangahake and Athenree gorges became starkly apparent. The capacity of the line was constrained by several factors; its length, severe grades of up to 1:50, sharp curves of up to 6 chains radius, and light 55 lb per yard rail which prohibited the use of the more powerful diesel locomotives. It was also an unreliable route, with frequent disruptions caused by slips. Easing of the ruling gradient to 1:300 allowed train weights to be increased from 530 to 900 tons for a single engine.

=== Proposals ===
Proposals to shorten the distance between Auckland and Tauranga were made as far back as the early 20th century. A line over the Kaimai Range was suggested in 1911 but was quickly dismissed as being impractical. In 1913, a 3.2 km tunnel was suggested, and in 1920 a survey was requested for a Kaimai rail route, though it would be many years before this happened.

In 1955, an investigation was made of the possibility of road and rail access to Mt. Maunganui from the Waikato including a 4 km tunnel, an idea that was enthusiastically supported by Federated Farmers, and later local news media. This led to the formation of the Kaimai Tunnel Committee.

Hopes for a timely start on such a line were dashed, when on 14 August 1958 it was announced that the project was to be deferred. A report that had been prepared on the subject stated that there was an insufficient volume of guaranteed traffic then or in the near future to justify the project at that time. Alternatives were mentioned, including a preferred 24 km route between Waharoa and Apata with a 9 km tunnel (essentially what ended up being the Kaimai Deviation). The budget for such an option was expected to be at least NZ$10.5 million. It was felt that there was still sufficient capacity on the existing line, and that the idea should be reviewed when demand required it.

=== Commission of Inquiry ===
Local interests were not satisfied with the 1958 report, and continued to prevail upon the government for action. In 1960, a deputation met with the Minister of Railways in order to impress upon him the importance of a replacement for the existing route, and as a result, a Commission of Inquiry was established in August 1962 to investigate "Improved Access by Land to the Port of Tauranga and Bay of Plenty". During the commission's hearings in October, submissions from 38 individuals and groups were heard and 261 pages of evidence submitted.

In conclusion, the commission postulated that freight traffic to the Bay of Plenty would double by 1982, a feat that was actually attained in 1966. It also made the following recommendations:

- The construction of a deviation from Waharoa to Apata through the Kaimai Range, and the closure of the Paeroa to Apata section of the East Coast Main Trunk.
- The construction of a Rotorua to Paengaroa deviation to eliminate the Mamaku Bank on the Rotorua Branch.
- An extension of the Rotorua Branch to the Waipa State Mill.

Following the publication of this report in 1963, the government authorised a survey of the whole deviation route. However, it was not until September 1964 that the project was actually approved at an estimated cost of $11,434,000. In November, construction was further delayed by six months until funding of $710,000 was finally approved in the following years budget for the 1965-1966 financial year. It was expected at the time that the project could be completed by October 1970.

In August 1962 a deviation from Wahora to Apata passing under the Kaimais was approved. Construction of the 24 km deviation, including an 8.85 km tunnel, began with the turning of the first sod on 2 October 1965. The new section was officially opened on 12 September 1978, the old route being closed next day.

=== Construction ===
At the turning-of-the-first-sod ceremony on 2 October 1965, the Minister of Works the Hon. Percy Allen (who was also the MP for the Bay of Plenty) officiated. The Chief Civil Engineer remarked at the time that the deviation would be an advantage to the whole North Island railway system, shortening the rail distance between Tauranga and Hamilton by 51.5 kilometres (32.0 mi), and the rail distance between Rotorua and Tauranga by 100 kilometres (62 mi). He expected that the construction costs could be recovered through savings on operational costs once the deviation was completed.

The work was carried out primarily by the Ministry of Works, who were responsible for the drilling of the tunnel. Various other related jobs were handled by private contractors, including the tunnel approaches and the laying of the track bed in the tunnel.

In planning for the construction of the tunnel, the possibility of using a Tunnel Boring Machine (TBM) was considered in 1966. Discussions were held in Australia with those that had experience with them, or had previously investigated using them, and as a result, it was felt that further investigations into the idea were justified. Rock samples were submitted to the manufacturers (Jarva Company) for an assessment of the suitability of the machines for the tunnel project. It was felt that such a machine would be able to handle the eastern end of the tunnel, but that the western end could pose problems if the rock was found to be too fractured.

The Jarva tunnelling machine was purchased and imported from the United States in 1970 at a cost of $1.4 million, a decision considered adventurous at the time as a TBM had not been used on this type of geology before. The boring head of up to 78 cutters, was driven at 6 rpm by eight 125 hp (93 kW) 440 volt motors, plus a 75 hp (56 kW) motor for the hydraulics and smaller motors for conveyors and other services. The TBM cut a bore of 5.95 m (19.5 ft) to 6.4 m (21 ft) diameter, which provided for future electrification. The TBM had over 2,000,000 lb (910 t) of thrust. 666,000 ft⋅lb (903,000 N⋅m) of rotation torque and a muck handling capacity 85 ft^{3} (2.4 m^{3}) a minute.

Despite concerns about starting at the western portal with the TBM, it was considered to be the better option to alleviate problems with drainage that would ensue otherwise because of the 1:300 ascending grade from west to east. Also, the tunnel was to terminate at the eastern end on a viaduct over the Whatakao Stream which had yet to be built.

Construction of the tunnel started at the western end on 15 January 1969 with the excavation of the approach cutting which reached 25 m deep at the portal. A layer of alluvial material at the tunnel face meant that this section had to be excavated by hand, first as a small pilot tunnel, later being enlarged to the final size.

It was at this time that the only lives were lost on the project. A cave-in, caused by a high ground water level, resulted in the loss of four lives. The rescue operation was able to save eight other workers who were trapped with those that perished.

Tunnelling resumed after a delay of several months, and by 1971 the TBM was ready to commence work. A three-month trial period had been allocated to assess the suitability of the TBM for work at the western portal. It soon became apparent that the nature of the rock at this end of the tunnel was too fractured for efficient operation of the TBM, resulting in the cutters and fill extraction systems of the machine being continually blocked by rock. By the end of the trial period, the TBM had only advanced 106 metres (348 ft) and was wearing out far more quickly than was hoped, so it was decided to dismantle it and move it to the eastern portal.

Work at the western end of the tunnel continued with traditional drill and blast methods. The profile of the western end, which had been round to accommodate the TBM, was changed to a horseshoe shape to better suit conventional tunnelling procedure. By the time the tunnel was finished, around 48% of the length of the tunnel had been bored using conventional methods.

Reasonable progress was made from the eastern end of the tunnel once the TBM had been reassembled there in April 1972. Though the wear on the machine caused by its use at the western end caused some mechanical problems, progress of up to 15 metres (49 ft) per 8-hour shift was achieved, though this was considerably reduced in wet areas. With up to 600 m³ of water flowing through the tunnel walls, continuous pumping was required to avoid flooding.

Ducted ventilation was initially sufficient for the machine and the workers in the tunnel, but the closer the excavation got to the midway point, the more the temperature increased. To combat this, the shifts were shortened, though eventually three refrigeration plants had to be installed for the western end and one at the eastern end.

=== Completion ===
The two headings of the tunnel workings met on 4 June 1976 when two pilot tunnels were drilled through to the other side to check the alignment. Though the official hole-through ceremony had been planned for 17 June, the dignitaries had to be content with shovelling some of the rubble as the TBM had again jammed with loose rock. Mr. L. Dillon, a project supervisor, became the first person to walk the tunnel end-to-end on 21 June.

The project plan had called for lining to be done once all excavations had been completed, but deteriorating rock, especially at the western end, meant that the plan had to change. The problem was solved by pumping concrete under high pressure behind steel liners.

==== Slab track ====
Once this was finished, the concrete track bed was laid by the private contractor Robert McGregor and Sons of the United Kingdom. Together with British Rail, they had developed a technique for laying paved concrete track (PACT). This method was chosen rather than the traditional ballast and sleepers to reduce maintenance costs for the track inside the tunnel. The slab track extends about 70 m (230 ft) beyond each end of the tunnel. Soft geology and groundwater resulted in voids under the tunnel floor. Repairs with resin were made in 2013 and 2018. Between 2015 and 2019, a cork pad under the rails was replaced by a rubber pad, as were 800 Pandrol fastener shoulders.

=== Opening ===
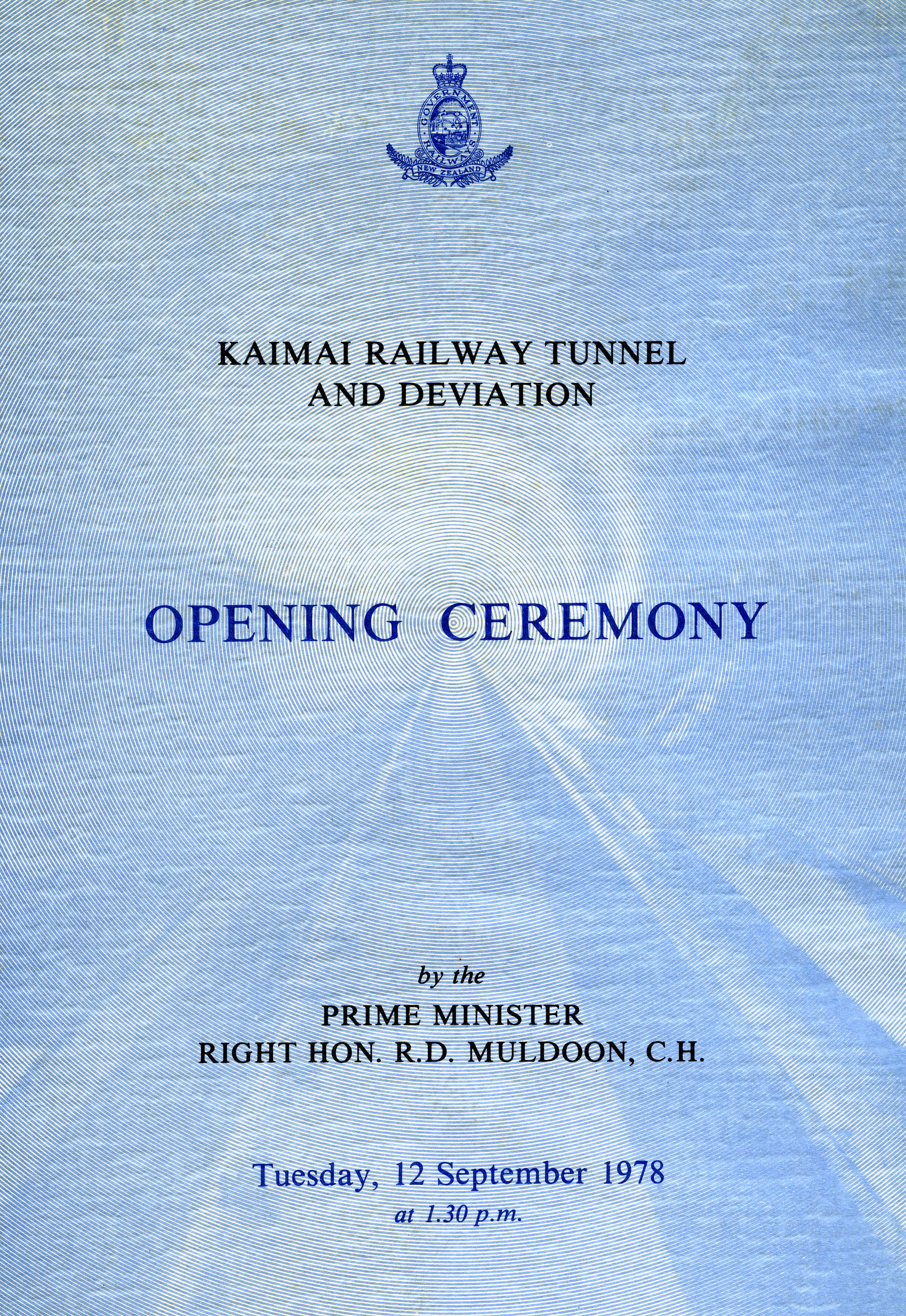
Front cover of a programme of the ceremony of the opening of the Kaimai railway tunnel and deviation, Tuesday 12 September 1978. Attended by the Prime Minister, Rt. Hon. Robert Muldoon.

The first official train through the tunnel was the Silver Fern railcar RM 3, which departed Hamilton railway station for Tauranga on 12 September 1978. On board were various railway officials and a party of 50 disabled Waikato school children.

After a lunch stop at Matamata, Prime Minister Robert Muldoon greeted the assembled crowd and boarded the train. The next stop was Hemopo, where a crowd had assembled. They were addressed by Piako County Council Chairman Mr. Thomas, the MP for Piako Mr. Jack Luxton and the Minister of Railways the Hon. Colin McLachlan. Then the Prime Minister gave a speech and unveiled a plaque paying tribute to the four workers who had lost their lives. Finally, he cut a ribbon and declared the tunnel to be open. The train proceeded to Tauranga with the official party and minus the school children where several civic functions were held.

The project ended up running eight years over time, and over budget. The final cost was $43 million for the tunnel and $13 million for the deviation, a total of $56 million.

== Approaches to the tunnel ==
The Kaimai Deviation is a 24.01 kilometres (14.92 mi) line between Waharoa and Apata, including several major cuttings, embankments and viaducts, while the tunnel makes up 8.879 kilometres (5.517 mi) of this distance 5.625 kilometres (3.495 mi) from the Apata end of the line. It had 26.5 mi (42.6 km) of new track, including yards at Waharoa, 15 bridges and over 2,000,000 yd^{3} (1,500,000 m^{3}) of earthworks and was expected to dig 380,000 yd^{3} (290,000 m^{3}) of rock.

The western approach begins at Waharoa, where new marshalling yards were built, then crosses a flat area, goes under SH 27, over two 240 ft (73 m) 240 ft bridges (No.37, Hardings Drain and No.38, Turanga-O-Moana Stream), under Tower Road and then a 600 ft (180 m) long reinforced concrete bridge (No.41) over the Waihou River. A bank of around 35 ft (11 m) crosses the flood plain at the start of a 1:300 grade to and through the tunnel (though 1:324 at the western portal of the tunnel and 323 through the tunnel) crossing the Gordon-Okauia road, on Bridge 41, to a passing loop at Hemopo.

The eastern approach has two bridges over the Whatakao Stream. Bridge 42, 3 m (9.8 ft) from the portal, is 123 ft (37 m) and bridge 43, 106.7 m (350 ft) long. The latter cost about $24,000 and rests on 4 piers. A 126 ft (38 m) cutting follows, then about a mile from the tunnel portal, Works Road crosses the line, followed by a 747 ft (228 m) long Wainui River bridge 45, 110 ft (34 m) above the river. Then Wainui South Road goes over the track, before it rejoins the old line at Apata.

== Today ==
Today, there are up to 22-weekday freight train movements per day through the Kaimai Tunnel, and up to 19 movements per day during the weekends. Freight transported over this route includes inter-port container traffic, timber and timber products, coal, manufactured goods, and petroleum.

Traffic on the Kaimai Deviation has been dominated by freight trains for its entire working life. Regular passenger trains to the Bay of Plenty had ceased in 1967 with the final running of a post-Taneatua Express 88 seater railcar service; the lengthy and time-consuming route that the tunnel replaced was part of the reason this railcar service had ceased to be viable. It was not until 9 December 1991 that regular service to the Bay of Plenty was re-introduced. Named the Kaimai Express after the tunnel, it ran between Auckland and Tauranga until its cancellation on 7 October 2001. For its entire existence, it was operated with Silver Fern railcars. Since the Railways Corporation relaxed its policy on private use of the national rail network in the 1980s, there have been occasional passenger excursions run on the deviation by organisations such as Mainline Steam and the Railway Enthusiasts Society.

A 814 m (2,671 ft) peak of the Kaimai Range directly above the tunnel, previously unnamed, was named Stokes Peak in 2010 in honour of geographer Evelyn Stokes. In 2012 the name of the mountain peak reverted to being unnamed.

== Geology ==
The tunnel runs through pumice, breccia, andesite and ignimbrite, interbedded with soft tuff. The rocks are about 3 to 5 million years old.

Water contamination with sulphur and arsenic, leached out of the rocks, have caused maintenance problems.
