= Talisman Mining =

- Type: Public
- Industry: Mining
- Website: talismanmining.com.au

Talisman Mining is an Australian mining corporation. It is publicly traded on the Australian Securities Exchange.
