= Goldfields Railway =

Heritage railway in New Zealand

Coordinates: 37°22′59″S 175°49′59″E

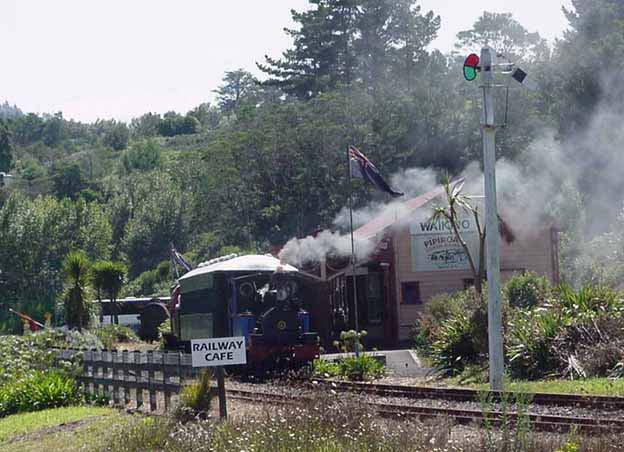
- The Goldfields Railway's 0-4-2 Peckett steam locomotive with a train at the Waikino terminus in 2005.
- Locale: Karangahake Gorge, Bay of Plenty, New Zealand

Commercial operations
- Name: Part of the East Coast Main Trunk Railway
- Built by: New Zealand Government Railways
- Original gauge: 1,067 mm (3 ft 6 in)

Preserved operations
- Owned by: Goldfields Railway Incorporated
- Stations: Two
- Length: 6 km (3.7 mi)
- Preserved gauge: 1,067 mm (3 ft 6 in)

Commercial history
- Opened: 1905 (to Waihi)
- Closed: 12 September 1978 (Paeroa - Tauranga)

The Goldfields Railway is a heritage railway that operates between Waihi and Waikino in the Bay of Plenty region of New Zealand's North Island. It operates over a section of track that was part of the East Coast Main Trunk Railway until the Kaimai Tunnel deviation made it redundant in 1978. The Goldfields Railway was formed in 1980 as the Goldfields Steam Train Society to retain a portion of the old mainline and switched to its current name in the mid-nineties.

== History ==
The route currently used by the Goldfields Railway was originally built through the Karangahake Gorge as the Waihi Branch from Paeroa on the Thames Branch to provide rail access to the significant mining activity that was then taking place in the Waihi area. It was not intended to be a mainline, but after extensive surveys and a few false starts, it became part of the East Coast Main Trunk to Tauranga, Te Puke, and ultimately Taneatua in 1928. This route was circuitous, thus making it less appealing than more direct road routes, but traffic nonetheless grew as Tauranga's port increased in importance and the Karangahake Gorge route lacked sufficient capacity. Accordingly, a new route was required and the direct Kaimai Tunnel deviation was built, opening on 12 September 1978. The Karangahake Gorge route was closed and dismantled in the 1980s, except for the 6 kilometres between Waihi and Waikino, which the Goldfields Railway saved.

== Preservation ==
In Waihi, much of the infrastructure of the station and yard remains intact and preserved; although some freight-related structures such as the livestock yards are gone, the goods shed, six railway houses, and small ancillary buildings remain, and the main station buildings are protected and recognised by Heritage New Zealand and the Rail Heritage Trust. The line to Waikino is 6 kilometres (3.7 mi) long and includes a few bridges, including the only private railway bridge over a state highway in New Zealand. In Waikino, the station is not the original one built on the site; it was formerly Paeroa's station and was transferred to Waikino in 1990, just before the mothballing and eventual closure of the railway through Paeroa to Thames in 1991. The station is now used as a café and to link the railway with a walkway through the Karangahake Gorge and other local attractions.

== Locomotives ==
The Goldfields Railway possesses a variety of locomotives, primarily small diesel locomotives used in private industry or for shunting on the national network. The locomotives include:

- Baguley-Drewry 0-6-0D diesel locomotive, built 1968
- Peckett 0-4-2T steam locomotive, built 1938
- Price 0-4-0PM petrol locomotive, built 1944
- TR class diesel locomotive, built 1948
- TR class diesel locomotive, also built 1948 but with different cab design
- DSA class 551, built 1954
- DBR class diesel locomotives, 1199 & 1282, built 1965 - 1966, rebuilt 1980 - 1982

These locomotives are augmented by a collection of velocipedes and motor trolleys that are primarily used for track inspection and maintenance.

The railway has also been visited by steam locomotives owned by others. During Easter 2006, as part of celebrations to mark over 100 years of the railway in Waihi, Y 542 owned by the Museum of Transport and Technology was brought to operate trips on the Goldfields Railway.

== Rolling stock ==
The Goldfields Railway's collection of rolling stock consists of both passenger carriages and freight wagons. The three passenger carriages are the focus of preservation efforts and date from 1911, 1913, and 1931. They are augmented by an open passenger carriage built in 1993 and attached to a chassis dating from 1911 and a guard's van. The society's diverse freight wagons are currently awaiting restoration. The collection of rolling stock also included Cowans-Sheldon 10-tonne railway crane N^{O} 227 built in 1937, which was relocated to its new owners at the Ferrymead Railway in 2009 for restoration to working order.

== Operation ==
Trains are run three times daily from Waihi to Waikino and return. The trip takes 30 minutes each way, with a 15-minute stopover at Waikino. Unlike many heritage railways and regular rail services, the Goldfields Railway allows pets to ride on the train, though only on the open carriage that is included in each journey's consist. The railway also offers charter services by arrangement and regularly hosts themed rides as fundraisers for local organisations.
