= Results of the 2025 New Zealand territorial authority elections in the Waikato =

2025 New Zealand territorial authority elections (Waikato)
- 11 October 2025
- Turnout: 135,187 (40.02% ▲0.08 pp)
- 10 of 10 local councils
| Party | Councils | +/– |
|---|---|---|
| No majority | 10 | 0 |
This lists parties that won seats. See the complete results below.
- 10 mayors and 110 local councillors
| Party | Seats | +/– |
Mayors
| Independent | 10 | 0 |
Local councillors
| Independent | 104 | −1 |
| Better Hamilton | 4 | +4 |
| Better Waipa | 1 | +1 |
| Let's Go Taupō | 1 | +1 |
This lists parties that won seats. See the complete results below.

Elections for the territorial authorities of New Zealand were held from 9 September until 11 October 2025 as part of that year's nation-wide local elections. 709 local councillors and 66 mayors were elected across 66 of 67 councils.

10 territorial authorities are located primarily within the Waikato Region. 10 mayors and 110 local councillors were elected. 3 of 10 mayors were re-elected and no group gained or held a majority on any council.

== Maps ==

Legend
| Independent hold | Independent gain |
| | Better Hamilton gain |
| | Better Waipa gain |
| | Let's Go Taupō gain |

== Summary ==
=== Overall ===
| Council | Electoral system | Seats | Mayor | Councillors | Control | Turnout | Details | Refs |
|---|---|---|---|---|---|---|---|---|
| Thames-Coromandel | FPP | 10 | ▌ Independent gain | ▌ Independent 10 (▲1) | ▌ No majority | 12,272; 48.11% ▼3.34 pp | Details | |
| Hauraki | FPP | 13 | ▌ Independent hold | ▌ Independent 13 ( 0) | ▌ No majority | 6,120; 40.24% ▼0.32 pp | Details | |
| Waikato | FPP | 13 | ▌ Independent gain | ▌ Independent 13 ( 0) | ▌ No majority | 20,360; 35.03% ▲2.72 pp | Details | |
| Matamata-Piako | FPP | 12 | ▌ Independent gain | ▌ Independent 12 ( 0) | ▌ No majority | 11,570; 45.85% ▲4.44 pp | Details | |
| Hamilton | STV | 14 | ▌ Independent gain | ▌ Independent 10 (▼2) ▌ Better Hamilton 4 (▲4) | ▌ No majority | 38,063; 32.97% ▲3.81 pp | Details | |
| Waipā | FPP | 11 | ▌ Independent gain | ▌ Independent 10 (▼1) ▌ Better Waipa 1 (▲1) | ▌ No majority | 17,411; 42.27% ▼1.89 pp | Details | |
| Ōtorohanga | FPP | 9 | ▌ Independent gain | ▌ Independent 9 ( 0) | ▌ No majority | 3,168; 49.90% ▲4.74 pp | Details | |
| South Waikato | FPP | 10 | ▌ Independent hold | ▌ Independent 10 ( 0) | ▌ No majority | 7,596; 46.05% ▲2.89 pp | Details | |
| Waitomo | FPP | 6 | ▌ Independent hold | ▌ Independent 6 ( 0) | ▌ No majority | 2,761; 46.15% ▲2.13 pp | Details | |
| Taupō | FPP | 12 | ▌ Independent gain | ▌ Independent 11 (▼1) ▌ Let's Go Taupō 1 (▲1) | ▌ No majority | 15,866; 56.13% ▲8.86 pp | Details | |
| 10 of 10 councils | | 90 | | | | | | |

=== Mayors ===
| Council | Incumbent | Elected | Runner-up | Details | Refs |
|---|---|---|---|---|---|
| Thames-Coromandel | Len Salt (Ind) | Peter Revell (Ind) | Patrick Kerr (Ind) | Details | |
| Hauraki | Toby Adams (Ind) | | Roman Jackson (Ind) | Details | |
| Waikato | Jacqui Church (Ind) | Aksel Bech (Ind) | Jacqui Church (Ind) | Details | |
| Matamata-Piako | Adrienne Wilcock (Ind) | Ash Tanner (Ind) | Adrienne Wilcock (Ind) | Details | |
| Hamilton | Paula Southgate^{R} (Ind) | Tim Macindoe (Ind) | Sarah Thomson (Ind) | Details | |
| Waipā | Susan O'Regan (Ind) | Mike Pettit (Ind) | Susan O'Regan (Ind) | Details | |
| Ōtorohanga | Max Baxter^{R} (Ind) | Rodney Dow (Ind) | Cathy Prendergast (Ind) | Details | |
| South Waikato | Gary Petley (Ind) | | Zed Latinovic (Ind) | Details | |
| Waitomo | John Robertson (Ind) | | Janette Osborne (Ind) | Details | |
| Taupō | David Trewavas (Ind) | John Funnell (Ind) | Zane Cozens (Ind) | Details | |
^{R} did not run for re-election

=== Candidates ===
| Party / ticket | Mayors | | | | Councillors | | | |
| Party / ticket | 2022 | Candidates | Elected | +/− | 2022 | Candidates | Elected | +/− |
|---|---|---|---|---|---|---|---|---|
| Independent | 10 | 44 | 10 | 0 | 105 | 217 | 104 | ▼1 |
| Better Hamilton | (new) | 1 | 0 | 0 | (new) | 9 | 4 | ▲4 |
| Better Waipa | no candidates | | | | (new) | 6 | 1 | ▲1 |
| Let's Go Taupō | no candidates | | | | (new) | 3 | 1 | ▲1 |
| ACT Local | no candidates | | | | (new) | 6 | 0 | 0 |
| Constitution | 0 | 1 | 0 | 0 | 0 | 2 | 0 | 0 |
| Animal Justice | 0 | 1 | 0 | 0 | no candidates | | | |
| Independent Green | no candidates | | | | 1 | 2 | 0 | ▼1 |
| Team Integrity | no candidates | | | | 1 | 0 | 0 | ▼1 |
| Seats: | 10 | | 10 | 0 | 107 | | 110 | ▲3 |

== Thames-Coromandel District Council ==
2025 Thames-Coromandel District Council election
- 11 October 2025
- Turnout: 12,272 (48.11% ▼3.34 pp)
- Mayor
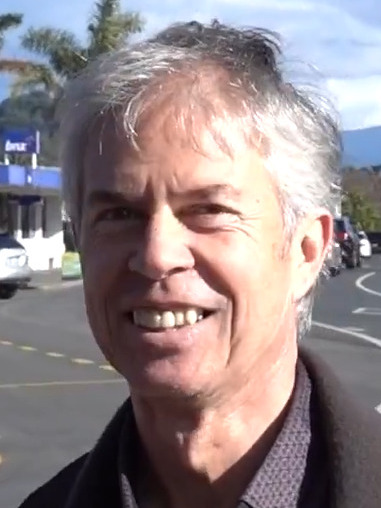
| | Ind | Ind |
| Candidate | Peter Revell | Patrick Kerr | Len Salt |
| Party | Independent | Independent | Independent |
| Popular vote | 3,724 | 3,116 | 3,035 |
| Percentage | 28.73% | 24.04% | 23.41% |
| | Ind | Ind |
| Candidate | Denise Messiter | Steve Hart |
| Party | Independent | Independent |
| Popular vote | 1,577 | 842 |
| Percentage | 12.17% | 6.50% |
Mayor before election
Len Salt
Independent
Elected mayor
Peter Revell
Independent
- Councillors
- 10 seats on the governing body of Thames-Coromandel District Council; 6 seats needed for a majority
| Party | Seats | +/– |
|---|---|---|
| Independent | 10 | +1 |
This lists parties that won seats. See the complete results below.
| Control before | Control after |
|---|---|
| No majority | No majority |

=== 2025 Thames-Coromandel mayoral election ===
2025 Thames-Coromandel mayoral election
| Party | Candidate | Votes | % | ±% |
|---|---|---|---|---|
| Independent | Peter Revell | 3,724 | 30.35 | (new) |
| Independent | Patrick Kerr | 3,116 | 25.39 | (new) |
| Independent | Len Salt^{†} | 3,035 | 24.73 | −14.81 |
| Independent | Denise Messiter | 1,577 | 12.85 | (new) |
| Independent | Steve Hart | 842 | 6.86 | −1.45 |
| Independent | James Subritzky | 415 | 3.38 | (new) |
| Informal votes | | 20 | 0.16 | +0.00 |
| Blank votes | | 234 | 1.91 | −0.21 |
| Turnout | | 12,272 | 48.11 | −3.34 |
| Registered electors | | 25,509 | | |
| Independent gain from Independent | | | | |
^{†} incumbent

=== Coromandel-Colville general ward ===
2025 Coromandel-Colville general ward election
| Party | Candidate | Votes | % | ±% |
|---|---|---|---|---|
| Independent | Robert Barry Ashman | 612 | 50.45 | (new) |
| Independent | John Reginald Morrissey^{†} | 568 | 46.83 | n/a |
| Informal votes | | 0 | 0.00 | n/a |
| Blank votes | | 33 | 2.72 | n/a |
| Turnout | | 1,213 | 55.49 | n/a |
| Registered electors | | 2,186 | | |
| Independent gain from Independent | | | | |
^{†} incumbent

=== Mercury Bay general ward ===
2025 Mercury Bay general ward election
| Party | Candidate | Votes | % | ±% |
|---|---|---|---|---|
| Independent | Flemming Rasmussen | 2,114 | 53.51 | (new) |
| Independent | John Kenneth Grant^{†} | 2,097 | 53.08 | +4.24 |
| Independent | Tony Brljevich | 2,040 | 51.63 | (new) |
| Independent | Rekha Giri-Percival^{†} | 1,946 | 49.25 | −13.51 |
| Independent | Deli Connell^{†} | 1,419 | 35.91 | −7.67 |
| Independent | Peter Haultain Wood | 327 | 8.28 | (new) |
| Informal votes | | 18 | 0.46 | −0.03 |
| Blank votes | | 90 | 2.28 | −0.14 |
| Turnout | | 3,951 | 49.82 | −3.91 |
| Registered electors | | 7,930 | | |
| Independent gain from Independent | | | | |
| Independent hold | | | | |
| Independent gain from Independent | | | | |
^{†} incumbent

=== South East general ward ===
2025 South East general ward election
| Party | Candidate | Votes | % | ±% |
|---|---|---|---|---|
| Independent | John William Freer | 1,245 | 36.95 | (new) |
| Independent | Alison Smith | 1,191 | 35.35 | (new) |
| Independent | Mark Drury | 1,142 | 33.90 | (new) |
| Independent | Neil Evans | 983 | 29.18 | (new) |
| Independent | Denis Beaver | 710 | 21.07 | (new) |
| Independent | Kurt Jarrett | 489 | 14.51 | (new) |
| Informal votes | | 17 | 0.50 | +0.42 |
| Blank votes | | 244 | 7.24 | +2.89 |
| Turnout | | 3,369 | 52.62 | −0.29 |
| Registered electors | | 6,403 | | |
| Independent gain from Independent | | | | |
| Independent gain from Independent | | | | |

=== Thames general ward ===
2025 Thames general ward election
| Party | Candidate | Votes | % | ±% |
|---|---|---|---|---|
| Independent | Greg Hampton | 1,932 | 51.67 | (new) |
| Independent | Robyn Sinclair^{†} | 1,691 | 45.23 | −18.49 |
| Independent | Martin Rodley^{†} | 1,406 | 37.60 | −16.42 |
| Independent | Kishan Raikwar | 1,215 | 32.50 | (new) |
| Independent | Cole Justin McDowell | 1,135 | 30.36 | (new) |
| Independent | Fiona Cameron | 874 | 23.38 | (new) |
| Independent | Scott Douglas Bright | 794 | 21.24 | (new) |
| Independent | Steve Hart | 520 | 13.91 | (new) |
| Independent | Steve Baker | 508 | 13.59 | (new) |
| Informal votes | | 39 | 1.04 | +0.66 |
| Blank votes | | 71 | 1.90 | −1.33 |
| Turnout | | 3,739 | 51.59 | +1.71 |
| Registered electors | | 7,248 | | |
| Independent gain from Independent | | | | |
| Independent hold | | | | |
| Independent hold | | | | |
^{†} incumbent

=== Te Tara o Te Ika Māori ward ===
2025 Te Tara o Te Ika Māori ward election
| Party | Candidate | Votes | % | ±% |
|---|---|---|---|---|
| Independent | Michael Barlow | elected unopposed | | |
| Registered electors | | 1,742 | | |
| Independent win (new seat) | | | | |

=== Referendum on Māori wards ===
| Choice | Votes | % |
|---|---|---|
| I vote to REMOVE Māori wards | 6,995 | 58.94 |
| I vote to KEEP Māori wards | 4,873 | 41.06 |
| Total | 11,868 | 100.00 |
| Valid votes | 11,868 | 91.55 |
| Invalid votes | 11 | 0.08 |
| Blank votes | 1,084 | 8.36 |
| Total votes | 12,963 | 100.00 |
| Registered voters/turnout | 25,509 | 50.82 |
Source: TCDC & MCERT

== Hauraki District Council ==
2025 Hauraki District Council election
- 11 October 2025
- Turnout: 6,120 (40.24% ▼0.32 pp)
- Mayor
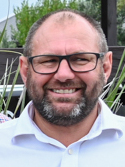
| | | Ind | Ind |
| Candidate | Toby Adams | Roman Jackson | Levi Burton |
| Party | Independent | Independent | Independent |
| Popular vote | 4,781 | 629 | 482 |
| Percentage | 78.12% | 10.28% | 7.88% |
Mayor before election
Toby Adams
Independent
Elected mayor
Toby Adams
Independent
- Councillors
- 13 seats on the governing body of Hauraki District Council; 7 seats needed for a majority
| Party | Seats | +/– |
|---|---|---|
| Independent | 13 | 0 |
This lists parties that won seats. See the complete results below.
| Control before | Control after |
|---|---|
| No majority | No majority |

=== 2025 Hauraki mayoral election ===
2025 Hauraki mayoral election
| Party | Candidate | Votes | % | ±% |
|---|---|---|---|---|
| Independent | Toby Adams^{†} | 4,781 | 78.12 | n/a |
| Independent | Roman Jackson | 629 | 10.28 | (new) |
| Independent | Levi Burton | 482 | 7.88 | (new) |
| Informal votes | | 18 | 0.29 | n/a |
| Blank votes | | 210 | 3.43 | n/a |
| Turnout | | 6,120 | 40.24 | n/a |
| Registered electors | | 15,210 | | |
| Independent hold | | | | |
^{†} incumbent

=== Paeroa general ward ===
2025 Paeroa general ward election
| Party | Candidate | Votes | % | ±% |
|---|---|---|---|---|
| Independent | Paul Armstrong Milner^{†} | 1,184 | 63.05 | −9.89 |
| Independent | Rino Lee Wilkinson^{†} | 1,103 | 58.73 | −12.01 |
| Independent | Jo Tilsley^{†} | 1,097 | 58.41 | −7.12 |
| Independent | Grant Michael Aitken | 998 | 53.14 | (new) |
| ACT Local | Michelle Elizabeth Magnus | 616 | 32.80 | (new) |
| Informal votes | | 4 | 0.21 | +0.11 |
| Blank votes | | 28 | 1.49 | +1.09 |
| Turnout | | 1,878 | 45.64 | +4.30 |
| Registered electors | | 4,115 | | |
| Independent hold | | | | |
| Independent hold | | | | |
| Independent hold | | | | |
^{†} incumbent

=== Plains general ward ===
2025 Plains general ward election
| Party | Candidate | Votes | % | ±% |
|---|---|---|---|---|
| Independent | Neil Gray^{†} | 1,366 | 79.37 | +9.15 |
| Independent | Stephen Crooymans^{†} | 1,262 | 73.33 | +23.94 |
| Independent | Ray Broad^{†} | 1,233 | 71.64 | +6.70 |
| Independent | Cynthia Bates | 772 | 44.86 | (new) |
| ACT Local | Andrew Pickford | 640 | 37.19 | (new) |
| Informal votes | | 2 | 0.12 | +0.12 |
| Blank votes | | 16 | 0.93 | +0.50 |
| Turnout | | 1,721 | 42.12 | +0.99 |
| Registered electors | | 4,086 | | |
| Independent hold | | | | |
| Independent hold | | | | |
| Independent hold | | | | |
| Independent gain from Independent | | | | |
^{†} incumbent

=== Waihī general ward ===
2025 Waihī general ward election
| Party | Candidate | Votes | % | ±% |
|---|---|---|---|---|
| Independent | Anne Marie Spicer^{†} | 1,663 | 79.42 | +10.42 |
| Independent | Austin Rattray^{†} | 1,305 | 62.32 | +5.74 |
| Independent | Amanda May Ryan | 1,284 | 61.32 | +28.23 |
| Independent | Sara Howell | 1,216 | 58.07 | +18.10 |
| Independent | Stuie Thompson | 685 | 32.71 | (new) |
| Independent | Roman Jackson | 483 | 23.07 | (new) |
| Independent | Levi Burton | 349 | 16.67 | (new) |
| Informal votes | | 3 | 0.14 | +0.01 |
| Blank votes | | 21 | 1.00 | +0.62 |
| Turnout | | 2,094 | 38.87 | −0.61 |
| Registered electors | | 5,387 | | |
| Independent hold | | | | |
| Independent hold | | | | |
| Independent gain from Independent | | | | |
| Independent gain from Independent | | | | |
^{†} incumbent

=== Te Pakikau o te Ika Māori ward ===
2025 Te Pakikau o te Ika Māori Ward election
| Party | Candidate | Votes | % | ±% |
|---|---|---|---|---|
| Independent | Rereahu Collie | elected unopposed | | |
| Independent | Desmond Tyler | elected unopposed | | |
| Registered electors | | 1,622 | | |
| Independent win (new seat) | | | | |
| Independent win (new seat) | | | | |

=== Referendum on Māori wards ===
| Choice | Votes | % |
|---|---|---|
| I vote to REMOVE Māori wards | 3,291 | 57.91 |
| I vote to KEEP Māori wards | 2,392 | 42.09 |
| Total | 5,683 | 100.00 |
| Valid votes | 5,683 | 92.86 |
| Invalid votes | 8 | 0.13 |
| Blank votes | 429 | 7.01 |
| Total votes | 6,120 | 100.00 |
| Registered voters/turnout | 15,210 | 40.24 |
Source: HDC & MCERT

== Waikato District Council ==
2025 Waikato District Council election
- 11 October 2025
- Turnout: 20,360 (35.03% ▲2.72 pp)
- Mayor
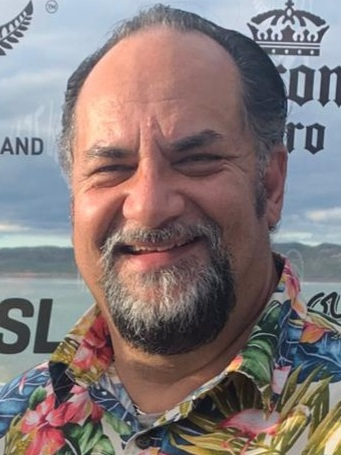
| | | Ind |
| Candidate | Aksel Bech | Jacqui Church |
| Party | Independent | Independent |
| Popular vote | 12,392 | 7,158 |
| Percentage | 60.86% | 35.16% |
Mayor before election
Jacqui Church
Independent
Elected mayor
Aksel Bech
Independent
- Councillors
- 13 seats on the governing body of Waikato District Council; 7 seats needed for a majority
| Party | Seats | +/– |
|---|---|---|
| Independent | 13 | 0 |
This lists parties that won seats. See the complete results below.
| Control before | Control after |
|---|---|
| No majority | No majority |

=== 2025 Waikato mayoral election ===
2025 Waikato mayoral election
| Party | Candidate | Votes | % | ±% |
|---|---|---|---|---|
| Independent | Aksel Bech | 12,392 | 60.86 | +24.75 |
| Independent | Jacqui Church^{†} | 7,158 | 35.16 | −6.12 |
| Informal votes | | 11 | 0.05 | −0.31 |
| Blank votes | | 799 | 3.92 | +1.76 |
| Turnout | | 20,360 | 35.03 | +2.72 |
| Registered electors | | 58,118 | | |
| Independent gain from Independent | | | | |
^{†} incumbent

=== Awaroa-Maramarua general ward ===
2025 Awaroa-Maramarua general ward election
| Party | Candidate | Votes | % | ±% |
|---|---|---|---|---|
| Independent | Peter Thomson^{†} | 930 | 71.05 | +32.51 |
| Independent | Amanda Rutherford | 330 | 25.21 | (new) |
| Informal votes | | 2 | 0.15 | −0.79 |
| Blank votes | | 47 | 3.59 | +1.16 |
| Turnout | | 1,309 | 32.27 | −0.35 |
| Registered electors | | 4,057 | | |
| Independent hold | | | | |
^{†} incumbent

=== Huntly general ward ===
2025 Huntly general ward election
| Party | Candidate | Votes | % | ±% |
|---|---|---|---|---|
| Independent | David Whyte^{†} | 854 | 58.25 | +13.17 |
| Independent | Michael Cresswell | 337 | 22.99 | (new) |
| Independent | Frank McInally | 246 | 16.78 | +8.70 |
| Informal votes | | 4 | 0.27 | −0.97 |
| Blank votes | | 24 | 1.64 | −0.05 |
| Turnout | | 1,466 | 35.24 | −2.38 |
| Registered electors | | 4,160 | | |
| Independent hold | | | | |
^{†} incumbent

=== Newcastle-Ngāruawāhia general ward ===
2025 Newcastle-Ngāruawāhia general ward election
| Party | Candidate | Votes | % | ±% |
|---|---|---|---|---|
| Independent | Grant Coombes | 1,977 | 61.40 | (new) |
| Independent | Eugene Patterson^{†} | 1,974 | 61.30 | −4.30 |
| Independent | Dianne Firth | 988 | 30.68 | (new) |
| Independent | Ganga Sudhan | 604 | 18.76 | (new) |
| Informal votes | | 6 | 0.19 | +0.16 |
| Blank votes | | 93 | 2.89 | +1.30 |
| Turnout | | 3,220 | 32.49 | +1.72 |
| Registered electors | | 9,910 | | |
| Independent gain from Independent | | | | |
| Independent hold | | | | |
^{†} incumbent

=== Tamahere-Woodlands general ward ===
2025 Tamahere-Woodlands general ward election
| Party | Candidate | Votes | % | ±% |
|---|---|---|---|---|
| Independent | Mike Keir^{†} | 2,140 | 55.98 | −3.27 |
| Independent | Crystal Beavis^{†} | 1,626 | 42.53 | −14.48 |
| ACT Local | Peter Mayall | 1,504 | 39.34 | (new) |
| Independent | Mark Manson | 754 | 19.72 | (new) |
| Independent | Anne Cao-Oulton | 733 | 19.17 | (new) |
| Informal votes | | 2 | 0.05 | +0.02 |
| Blank votes | | 60 | 1.57 | +0.46 |
| Turnout | | 3,823 | 39.06 | +3.64 |
| Registered electors | | 9,788 | | |
| Independent hold | | | | |
| Independent hold | | | | |
^{†} incumbent

=== Tuakau-Pōkeno general ward ===
2025 Tuakau-Pōkeno general ward election
| Party | Candidate | Votes | % | ±% |
|---|---|---|---|---|
| Independent | Vern Reeve^{†} | 1,338 | 45.88 | −10.47 |
| Independent | Fabio Rodrigues | 1,274 | 43.69 | (new) |
| Independent | Stephanie Henderson | 1,073 | 36.80 | (new) |
| Independent | Kandi Ngataki^{†} | 716 | 24.55 | −1.23 |
| Independent | Bronwyn Heath | 653 | 22.39 | (new) |
| Informal votes | | 2 | 0.07 | +0.07 |
| Blank votes | | 37 | 1.27 | +0.90 |
| Turnout | | 2,916 | 31.24 | +1.77 |
| Registered electors | | 9,335 | | |
| Independent hold | | | | |
| Independent gain from Independent | | | | |
^{†} incumbent

=== Waerenga-Whitikahu general ward ===
2025 Waeranga-Whitikahu general ward election
| Party | Candidate | Votes | % | ±% |
|---|---|---|---|---|
| Independent | Marlene Raumati^{†} | 982 | 56.76 | −17.78 |
| Independent | Denise Dickinson | 687 | 39.71 | +17.89 |
| Informal votes | | 5 | 0.29 | +0.29 |
| Blank votes | | 56 | 3.24 | −0.41 |
| Turnout | | 1,730 | 37.45 | +3.72 |
| Registered electors | | 4,620 | | |
| Independent hold | | | | |
^{†} incumbent

=== Western Districts general ward ===
2025 Western Districts general ward election
| Party | Candidate | Votes | % | ±% |
|---|---|---|---|---|
| Independent | Carolyn Eyre^{†} | elected unopposed | | |
| Registered electors | | 3,613 | | |
| Independent hold | | | | |
^{†} incumbent

=== Whāingaroa general ward ===
2025 Whāingaroa general ward election
| Party | Candidate | Votes | % | ±% |
|---|---|---|---|---|
| Independent | Lisa Thomson^{†} | 1,022 | 61.23 | −17.84 |
| Independent | Nicola Laboyrie | 605 | 36.25 | (new) |
| Informal votes | | 1 | 0.06 | +0.06 |
| Blank votes | | 41 | 2.46 | +0.23 |
| Turnout | | 1,669 | 39.80 | +2.27 |
| Registered electors | | 4,193 | | |
| Independent hold | | | | |
^{†} incumbent

=== Tai Raro Takiwaa Maaori ward ===
2025 Tai Raro Takiwaa Maaori ward election
| Party | Candidate | Votes | % | ±% |
|---|---|---|---|---|
| Independent | Endine Dixon-Harris | 521 | 37.06 | (new) |
| Independent | Donna Pokere-Phillips | 470 | 33.43 | (new) |
| Independent | Rosalie Ellis | 361 | 25.68 | (new) |
| Informal votes | | 8 | 0.57 | +0.57 |
| Blank votes | | 46 | 3.27 | −0.31 |
| Turnout | | 1,406 | 32.36 | +7.98 |
| Registered electors | | 4,345 | | |
| Independent gain from Independent | | | | |

=== Tai Runga Takiwaa Maaori ward ===
2025 Tai Runga Takiwaa Maaori election
| Party | Candidate | Votes | % | ±% |
|---|---|---|---|---|
| Independent | Tilly Turner^{†} | elected unopposed | | |
| Registered electors | | 4,097 | | |
| Independent hold | | | | |
^{†} incumbent

=== Referendum on Māori wards ===
| Choice | Votes | % |
|---|---|---|
| I vote to REMOVE Māori wards | 10,065 | 51.82 |
| I vote to KEEP Māori wards | 9,358 | 48.18 |
| Total | 19,423 | 100.00 |
| Registered voters/turnout | 58,118 | – |
Source: WDC & MCERT

== Matamata-Piako District Council ==
2025 Matamata-Piako District Council election
- 11 October 2025
- Turnout: 11,570 (45.85% ▲4.44 pp)
- Mayor
| | Ind | Ind | Ind |
| Candidate | Ash Tanner | Adrienne Wilcock | Roman Jackson |
| Party | Independent | Independent | Independent |
| Popular vote | 5,950 | 4,849 | 606 |
| Percentage | 51.43% | 41.91% | 5.24% |
Mayor before election
Adrienne Wilcock
Independent
Elected mayor
Ash Tanner
Independent
- Councillors
- 12 seats on the governing body of Matamata-Piako District Council; 7 seats needed for a majority
| Party | Seats | +/– |
|---|---|---|
| Independent | 12 | 0 |
This lists parties that won seats. See the complete results below.
| Control before | Control after |
|---|---|
| No majority | No majority |

=== 2025 Matamata-Piako mayoral election ===
2025 Matamata-Piako mayoral election
| Party | Candidate | Votes | % | ±% |
|---|---|---|---|---|
| Independent | Ash Tanner | 5,950 | 51.43 | (new) |
| Independent | Adrienne Wilcock^{†} | 4,849 | 41.91 | +0.68 |
| Independent | Roman Jackson | 606 | 5.24 | (new) |
| Informal votes | | 8 | 0.07 | −0.04 |
| Blank votes | | 157 | 1.36 | −0.51 |
| Turnout | | 11,570 | 45.85 | +4.44 |
| Registered electors | | 25,233 | | |
| Independent gain from Independent | | | | |
^{†} incumbent

=== Morrinsville general ward ===
2025 Morrinsville general ward election
| Party | Candidate | Votes | % | ±% |
|---|---|---|---|---|
| Independent | James Thomas^{†} | 2,730 | 69.77 | +0.53 |
| Independent | Grace Bonnar | 2,410 | 61.59 | (new) |
| Independent | Bruce Dewhurst^{†} | 2,259 | 57.73 | −1.65 |
| Independent | Dayne Horne^{†} | 1,950 | 49.83 | −4.10 |
| Independent | Sharon Dean^{†} | 1,854 | 47.38 | +9.31 |
| Independent | Wayne Aberhart | 1,635 | 41.78 | (new) |
| Informal votes | | 4 | 0.10 | +0.10 |
| Blank votes | | 56 | 1.43 | −0.34 |
| Turnout | | 3,913 | 44.82 | +3.13 |
| Registered electors | | 8,731 | | |
| Independent hold | | | | |
| Independent gain from Independent | | | | |
| Independent hold | | | | |
| Independent hold | | | | |
^{†} incumbent

=== Te Aroha general ward ===
2025 Te Aroha general ward election
| Party | Candidate | Votes | % | ±% |
|---|---|---|---|---|
| Independent | Andrew Peter McGiven | 1,718 | 63.84 | (new) |
| Independent | Greg Marshall | 1,210 | 44.96 | (new) |
| Independent | Tyrel Glass | 1,020 | 37.90 | (new) |
| Independent | Vicki Black | 947 | 35.19 | (new) |
| Independent | Paul Decker | 835 | 31.03 | (new) |
| Independent | Jill Taylor | 774 | 28.76 | −0.81 |
| Independent | Roman Jackson | 314 | 11.67 | (new) |
| Informal votes | | 4 | 0.15 | +0.07 |
| Blank votes | | 53 | 1.97 | −0.92 |
| Turnout | | 2,691 | 51.81 | +7.11 |
| Registered electors | | 5,194 | | |
| Independent gain from Independent | | | | |
| Independent gain from Independent | | | | |
| Independent gain from Independent | | | | |

=== Matamata general ward ===
2025 Matamata general ward election
| Party | Candidate | Votes | % | ±% |
|---|---|---|---|---|
| Independent | James Sainsbury^{†} | 3,189 | 78.51 | +12.68 |
| Independent | Sue Whiting^{†} | 2,764 | 68.05 | +5.51 |
| Independent | Vincent Andersen | 2,617 | 64.43 | (new) |
| Independent | Rewiti Vaimoso | 2,335 | 57.48 | (new) |
| Independent | Kevin Tappin^{†} | 2,048 | 50.42 | −11.65 |
| Independent | Mark S Ball | 1,090 | 26.83 | (new) |
| Independent | Caleb John Ansell^{†} | 979 | 24.10 | −2.92 |
| Informal votes | | 3 | 0.07 | −0.02 |
| Blank votes | | 67 | 1.65 | +0.14 |
| Turnout | | 4,062 | 44.14 | −3.49 |
| Registered electors | | 9,203 | | |
| Independent hold | | | | |
| Independent hold | | | | |
| Independent gain from Independent | | | | |
| Independent gain from Independent | | | | |
^{†} incumbent

=== Te Toa Horopū ā-Matamata-Piako Māori ward ===
2025 Te Toa Horopū ā-Matamata-Piako Māori ward election
| Party | Candidate | Votes | % | ±% |
|---|---|---|---|---|
| Independent | Gary Thompson^{†} | elected unopposed | | |
| Registered electors | | 1,975 | | |
| Independent hold | | | | |
^{†} incumbent

=== Referendum on Māori wards ===
| Choice | Votes | % |
|---|---|---|
| I vote to REMOVE Māori wards | 6,544 | 63.17 |
| I vote to KEEP Māori wards | 3,815 | 36.83 |
| Total | 10,359 | 100.00 |
| Valid votes | 10,359 | 89.53 |
| Invalid votes | 3 | 0.03 |
| Blank votes | 1,208 | 10.44 |
| Total votes | 11,570 | 100.00 |
| Registered voters/turnout | 25,233 | 45.85 |
Source: electionz.com & MCERT

== Hamilton City Council ==
2025 Hamilton City Council election
- 11 October 2025
- Turnout: 38,063 (32.97% ▲3.81 pp)
- Mayor
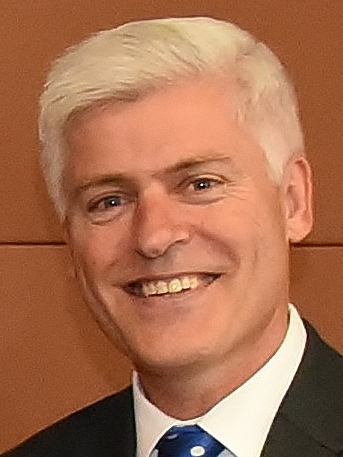

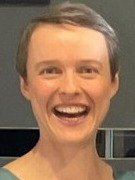
| Candidate | Tim Macindoe | Sarah Thomson |
| Party | Independent | Independent |
| Primary vote | 16,895 | 9,240 |
| Percentage | 44.39% | 24.28% |
| Final vote | 18,275 | 10,183 |
| Percentage | 50.30% | 28.03% |
| | Ind | Ind |
| Candidate | Maria Huata | Rachel Karalus |
| Party | Independent | Independent |
| Primary vote | 3,718 | 3,049 |
| Percentage | 9.77% | 8.01% |
| Final vote | 4,329 | 3,546 |
| Percentage | 11.91% | 9.76% |
Mayor before election
Paula Southgate
Independent
Elected mayor
Tim Macindoe
Independent
- Councillors
- 14 seats on the governing body of Hamilton City Council; 8 seats needed for a majority
| Party | Seats | +/– |
|---|---|---|
| Independent | 10 | −2 |
| Better Hamilton | 4 | +4 |
This lists parties that won seats. See the complete results below.
| Control before | Control after |
|---|---|
| No majority | No majority |

=== 2025 Hamilton mayoral election ===
2025 Hamilton mayoral election
| Party | Candidate | Primary votes | % | ±% | Iteration | |
| Party | Candidate | Primary votes | % | ±% | # | Votes |
|---|---|---|---|---|---|---|
| Independent | Tim Macindoe | 16,895 | 44.39 | (new) | 9th | 18,275 |
| Independent | Sarah Thomson | 9,240 | 24.28 | (new) | 9th | 10,183 |
| Independent | Maria Huata | 3,718 | 9.77 | (new) | 9th | 4,329 |
| Independent | Rachel Karalus | 3,049 | 8.01 | (new) | 9th | 3,546 |
| Independent | Rudi Du Plooy | 1,427 | 3.75 | (new) | 8th | 1,692 |
| Independent | Dave Taylor | 818 | 2.15 | (new) | 7th | 1,047 |
| Better Hamilton | John McDonald | 657 | 1.73 | (new) | 6th | 759 |
| Animal Justice | Lily Carrington | 632 | 1.66 | (new) | 5th | 681 |
| Constitution | Roman Tupaea-Warren | 310 | 0.81 | (new) | 4th | 347 |
| Independent | Jack Gielen | 271 | 0.71 | −0.89 | 3rd | 292 |
| Independent | Roger Stratford | 214 | 0.56 | (new) | 2nd | 220 |
| Independent | Guy Wayne Temoni-Syme | 212 | 0.56 | (new) | 1st | 212 |
| Quota | | 18,722 | 49.19 | n/a | | |
| Informal votes | | 210 | 0.55 | −0.12 | | |
| Blank votes | | 410 | 1.08 | −0.20 | | |
| Turnout | | 38,063 | 32.97 | +3.81 | | |
| Registered electors | | 115,433 | | | | |
| Independent gain from Independent on 9th iteration | | | | | | |

=== West general ward ===
2025 West general ward election
| Party | Candidate | Primary votes | % | ±% | Iteration | |
| Party | Candidate | Primary votes | % | ±% | # | Votes |
|---|---|---|---|---|---|---|
| Independent | Geoff Taylor^{†} | 2,628 | 17.85 | −16.41 | 1st | 2,628 |
| Independent | Sarah Thomson^{†} | 2,882 | 19.58 | +6.13 | 1st | 2,882 |
| Better Hamilton | Graeme Mead | 1,566 | 10.64 | (new) | 10th | 2,035 |
| Better Hamilton | Mesh MacDonald | 1,106 | 7.51 | (new) | 16th | 2,324 |
| Independent | Angela O'Leary^{†} | 1,024 | 6.96 | −8.94 | 18th | 1,936 |
| Independent | Emma Pike^{†} | 710 | 4.82 | −9.22 | 21st | 1,868 |
| Independent Green | Louise Hutt^{†} | 989 | 6.72 | −5.94 | 21st | 1,733 |
| Better Hamilton | Mark Alexander Flyger | 712 | 4.84 | (new) | 15th | 1,335 |
| Better Hamilton | Michael West | 541 | 3.68 | −6.55 | 11th | 908 |
| Independent | Dave Taylor | 524 | 3.56 | (new) | 9th | 785 |
| ACT Local | Nidhita Gosai | 543 | 3.69 | (new) | 7th | 630 |
| Independent | Allan James McKie | 416 | 2.83 | (new) | 6th | 516 |
| Independent | Matthew James Peter Beveridge | 408 | 2.77 | (new) | 5th | 484 |
| Independent | Paul Alforque | 188 | 1.28 | (new) | 3rd | 212 |
| Independent | Roderick John Young | 58 | 0.39 | (new) | 2nd | 65 |
| Quota | | 2,042 | 13.87 | n/a | | |
| Informal votes | | 175 | 1.19 | −1.83 | | |
| Blank votes | | 249 | 1.69 | +0.45 | | |
| Turnout | | 14,719 | 32.47 | +2.40 | | |
| Registered electors | | 45,336 | | | | |
| Independent hold on 1st iteration | | | | | | |
| Independent hold on 1st iteration | | | | | | |
| Better Hamilton gain from Independent on 10th iteration | | | | | | |
| Better Hamilton gain from Independent Green on 16th iteration | | | | | | |
| Independent hold on 18th iteration | | | | | | |
| Independent hold on 21st iteration | | | | | | |
^{†} incumbent

=== East general ward ===
2025 East general ward election
| Party | Candidate | Primary votes | % | ±% | Iteration | |
| Party | Candidate | Primary votes | % | ±% | # | Votes |
|---|---|---|---|---|---|---|
| Independent | Rachel Karalus | 2,288 | 11.96 | (new) | 15th | 2,607 |
| Better Hamilton | Andrew Bydder^{†} | 1,916 | 10.02 | −2.66 | 17th | 2,561 |
| Independent | Anna Casey-Cox^{†} | 1,593 | 8.33 | −8.16 | 21st | 2,744 |
| Independent | Jamie Strange | 1,511 | 7.90 | (new) | 23rd | 2,535 |
| Better Hamilton | Leo Liu | 1,320 | 6.90 | (new) | 24th | 2,588 |
| Independent | Sue Moroney | 1,326 | 6.93 | (new) | 25th | 2,431 |
| Independent | Marie Hamilton | 1,135 | 5.93 | (new) | 25th | 2,104 |
| Independent | Rudi Du Plooy | 872 | 4.56 | (new) | 22nd | 1,317 |
| Independent | Maxine Joy Van Oosten^{†} | 848 | 4.43 | −9.03 | 20th | 1,142 |
| Independent | Rachel Afeaki | 773 | 4.04 | (new) | 18th | 1,053 |
| ACT Local | Preet Raj Singh Dhaliwal | 645 | 3.37 | (new) | 16th | 796 |
| Independent Green | Danielle Marks | 555 | 2.90 | (new) | 15th | 718 |
| Better Hamilton | John McDonald | 525 | 2.74 | (new) | 14th | 647 |
| Independent | Jackie Talbot | 491 | 2.57 | (new) | 13th | 558 |
| Independent | Jenny Nand | 457 | 2.39 | −4.10 | 12th | 520 |
| Better Hamilton | Stuart David Aitken | 438 | 2.29 | (new) | 11th | 484 |
| Independent | Peter Humphreys | 376 | 1.97 | (new) | 10th | 440 |
| Better Hamilton | Horiana Adrienne Henderson | 273 | 1.43 | −3.52 | 9th | 298 |
| Independent | Jason Jonassen | 229 | 1.20 | −2.22 | 8th | 248 |
| Independent | Jono Ng | 185 | 0.97 | (new) | 7th | 191 |
| Independent | Tim Hunt | 142 | 0.74 | (new) | 6th | 147 |
| Independent | Jack Gielen | 140 | 0.73 | −1.50 | 5th | 146 |
| Independent | Alexander Bruce McConnochie | 84 | 0.44 | (new) | 4th | 84 |
| Constitution | Suhair Sabah Hassan | 73 | 0.38 | (new) | 3rd | 82 |
| Constitution | Louise Rachel Harvey | 46 | 0.24 | (new) | 2nd | 47 |
| Independent | Turi Robinson | 29 | 0.15 | (new) | 1st | 29 |
| Independent | Tim Macindoe^{†} | 0 | 0.00 | (new) | 1st | 0 |
| Quota | | 2,610 | 13.64 | n/a | | |
| Informal votes | | 386 | 2.02 | −2.42 | | |
| Blank votes | | 183 | 0.96 | −0.75 | | |
| Turnout | | 19,131 | 34.94 | +2.47 | | |
| Registered electors | | 54,748 | | | | |
| Independent gain from Independent on 15th iteration | | | | | | |
| Better Hamilton gain from Team Integrity on 17th iteration | | | | | | |
| Independent hold on 21st iteration | | | | | | |
| Independent gain from Independent on 23rd iteration | | | | | | |
| Better Hamilton gain from Independent on 24th iteration | | | | | | |
| Independent gain from Independent on 25th iteration | | | | | | |
^{†} incumbent

=== Kirikiriroa Maaori ward ===
2025 Kirkiriroa Maaori ward election
| Party | Candidate | Primary votes | % | ±% | Iteration | |
| Party | Candidate | Primary votes | % | ±% | # | Votes |
|---|---|---|---|---|---|---|
| Independent | Maria Huata^{†} | 2,620 | 62.19 | (new) | 1st | 2,620 |
| Independent | Robbie Neha | 511 | 12.13 | (new) | 5th | 1,163 |
| Independent | Jahvaya Watene Wheki | 383 | 9.09 | (new) | 5th | 1,013 |
| Independent | Jarrad Gallagher | 350 | 8.31 | (new) | 4th | 550 |
| Independent | Lawrence Jensen | 189 | 4.49 | (new) | 3rd | 317 |
| Independent | Andrew Lewis Pope | 20 | 0.47 | (new) | 2nd | 31 |
| Quota | | 1,358 | 32.23 | n/a | | |
| Informal votes | | 71 | 1.69 | +0.10 | | |
| Blank votes | | 69 | 1.64 | −2.10 | | |
| Turnout | | 4,213 | 27.45 | +12.72 | | |
| Registered electors | | 15,349 | | | | |
| Independent hold on 1st iteration | | | | | | |
| Independent gain from Independent on 5th iteration | | | | | | |
^{†} incumbent

=== Referendum on Māori wards ===
| Choice | Votes | % |
|---|---|---|
| I vote to KEEP Māori wards | 19,190 | 54.04 |
| I vote to REMOVE Māori wards | 16,320 | 45.96 |
| Total | 35,510 | 100.00 |
| Valid votes | 35,510 | 93.29 |
| Invalid votes | 18 | 0.05 |
| Blank votes | 2,535 | 6.66 |
| Total votes | 38,063 | 100.00 |
| Registered voters/turnout | 115,433 | 32.97 |
Source: HCC & MCERT

== Waipā District Council ==
2025 Waipā District Council election
- 11 October 2025
- Turnout: 17,411 (42.27% ▼1.89 pp)
- Mayor

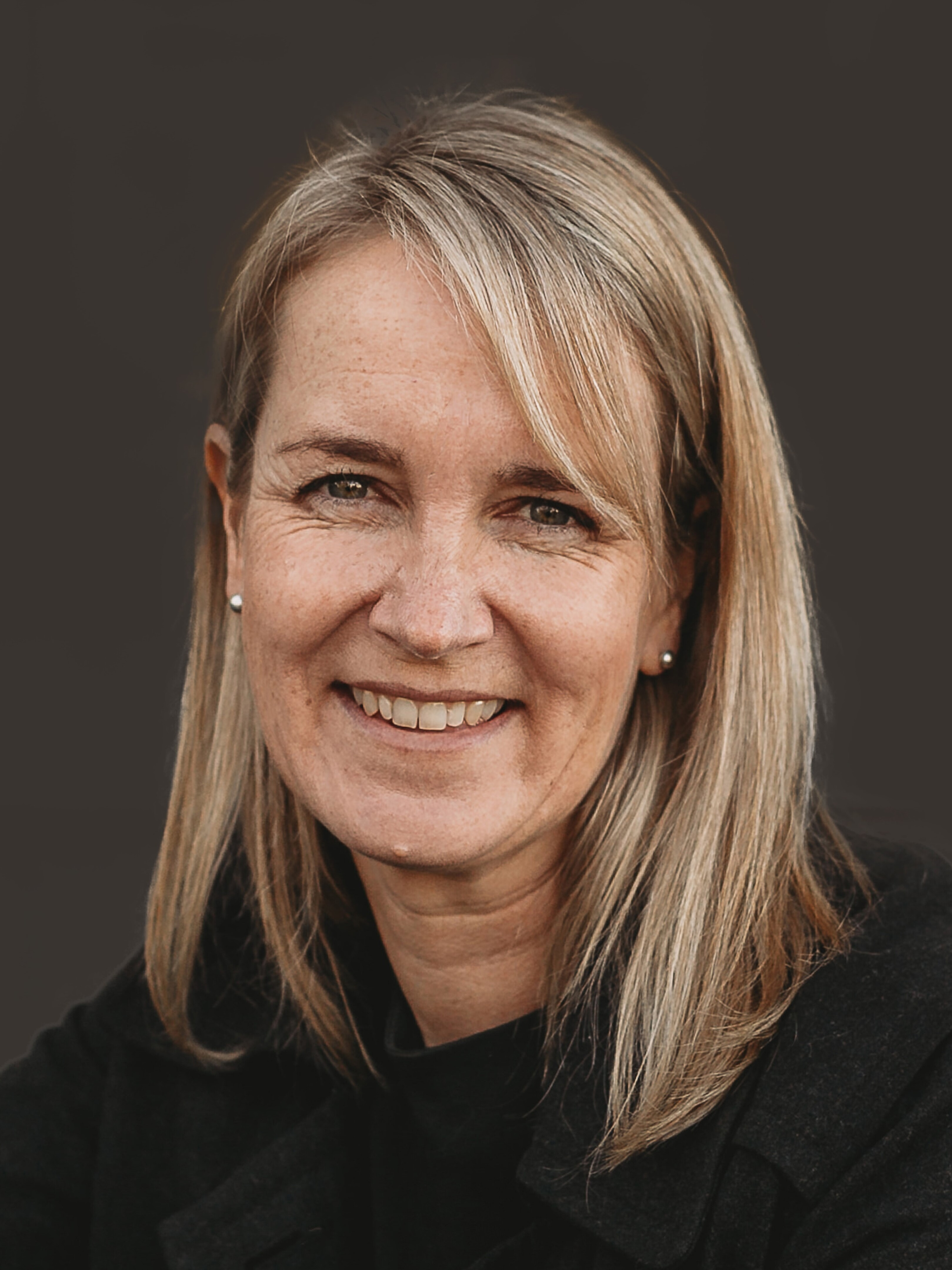
| | | | Ind |
| Candidate | Mike Pettit | Susan O'Regan | Clare St Pierre |
| Party | Independent | Independent | Independent |
| Popular vote | 7,216 | 5,968 | 3,838 |
| Percentage | 41.45% | 34.28% | 22.04% |
Mayor before election
Susan O'Regan
Independent
Elected mayor
Mike Pettit
Independent
- Councillors
- 11 seats on the governing body of Waipā District Council; 6 seats needed for a majority
| Party | Seats | +/– |
|---|---|---|
| Independent | 10 | −1 |
| Better Waipa | 1 | +1 |
This lists parties that won seats. See the complete results below.
| Control before | Control after |
|---|---|
| No majority | No majority |

=== 2025 Waipā mayoral election ===
2025 Waipā mayoral election
| Party | Candidate | Votes | % | ±% |
|---|---|---|---|---|
| Independent | Mike Pettit | 7,216 | 41.45 | (new) |
| Independent | Susan O'Regan^{†} | 5,968 | 34.28 | −8.87 |
| Independent | Clare St Pierre | 3,838 | 22.04 | (new) |
| Informal votes | | 9 | 0.05 | −0.08 |
| Blank votes | | 380 | 2.18 | +0.64 |
| Turnout | | 17,411 | 42.27 | +1.89 |
| Registered electors | | 41,188 | | |
| Independent gain from Independent | | | | |
^{†} incumbent

=== Pirongia and Kakepuku general ward ===
2025 Pirongia and Kakepuku general ward election
| Party | Candidate | Votes | % | ±% |
|---|---|---|---|---|
| Independent | Clare St Pierre^{†} | 1,932 | 61.61 | −5.67 |
| Better Waipa | Les Bennett | 1,582 | 50.45 | (new) |
| Independent | Naomi Pocock | 1,374 | 43.81 | (new) |
| Informal votes | | 0 | 0.00 | +0.00 |
| Blank votes | | 79 | 2.52 | −1.50 |
| Turnout | | 3,136 | 38.95 | +0.60 |
| Registered electors | | 8,052 | | |
| Independent hold | | | | |
| Better Waipa gain from Independent | | | | |
^{†} incumbent

=== Cambridge general ward ===
2025 Cambridge general ward election
| Party | Candidate | Votes | % | ±% |
|---|---|---|---|---|
| Independent | Jo Davies-Colley | 4,040 | 54.45 | (new) |
| Independent | Roger Gordon^{†} | 2,728 | 36.77 | −22.74 |
| Independent | Aidhean Camson | 2,140 | 28.84 | (new) |
| Independent | Pip Kempthorne | 2,032 | 27.39 | (new) |
| Independent | Dave Marinkovich | 1,996 | 26.90 | (new) |
| Better Waipa | Hope Spooner | 1,943 | 26.19 | (new) |
| Independent | Barry Quayle | 1,902 | 25.64 | (new) |
| Better Waipa | Mike Cater | 1,895 | 25.54 | (new) |
| ACT Local | Stuart Hylton | 1,621 | 21.85 | (new) |
| Independent | Philip Coles^{†} | 1,482 | 19.98 | −31.26 |
| Independent | Donna Sanders | 1,479 | 19.94 | −18.99 |
| Better Waipa | Ian Hayton | 1,263 | 17.02 | (new) |
| Independent | Karla Lugatiman | 584 | 7.87 | (new) |
| Independent | Stuart Matthews | 332 | 4.47 | (new) |
| Informal votes | | 18 | 0.24 | +0.19 |
| Blank votes | | 154 | 2.08 | +0.33 |
| Turnout | | 7,419 | 45.84 | +3.41 |
| Registered electors | | 16,186 | | |
| Independent gain from Independent | | | | |
| Independent hold | | | | |
| Independent gain from Independent | | | | |
| Independent gain from Independent | | | | |
^{†} incumbent

=== Maungatautari general ward ===
2025 Maungatautari general ward election
| Party | Candidate | Votes | % | ±% |
|---|---|---|---|---|
| Independent | Mike Montgomerie^{†} | elected unopposed | | |
| Registered electors | | 3,437 | | |
| Independent hold | | | | |
^{†} incumbent

=== Te Awamutu and Kihikihi general ward ===
2025 Te Awamutu and Kihikihi general ward election
| Party | Candidate | Votes | % | ±% |
|---|---|---|---|---|
| Independent | Shane Walsh | 2,276 | 53.48 | (new) |
| Independent | Dean Taylor | 2,182 | 51.27 | (new) |
| Independent | Marcus Gower^{†} | 1,659 | 38.98 | −20.67 |
| Independent | Lou Brown^{†} | 1,411 | 33.15 | −26.12 |
| Better Waipa | Bernard Westerbaan | 1,283 | 30.15 | −3.68 |
| Better Waipa | Lyn Hunt | 1,268 | 29.79 | (new) |
| Independent | Graham Jull | 1,164 | 27.35 | (new) |
| Informal votes | | 26 | 0.61 | +0.20 |
| Blank votes | | 68 | 1.60 | −0.76 |
| Turnout | | 4,256 | 39.70 | −2.35 |
| Registered electors | | 10,720 | | |
| Independent gain from Independent | | | | |
| Independent gain from Independent | | | | |
| Independent hold | | | | |
^{†} incumbent

=== Waipā Māori ward ===
2025 Waipā Māori ward election
| Party | Candidate | Votes | % | ±% |
|---|---|---|---|---|
| Independent | Dale-Maree Morgan | 523 | 52.40 | (new) |
| Independent | Yvonne Waho | 439 | 43.99 | (new) |
| Informal votes | | 1 | 0.10 | −0.07 |
| Blank votes | | 35 | 3.51 | +0.54 |
| Turnout | | 998 | 35.73 | +12.06 |
| Registered electors | | 2,793 | | |
| Independent gain from Independent | | | | |

=== Referendum on Māori wards ===
| Choice | Votes | % |
|---|---|---|
| I vote to REMOVE Māori wards | 9,290 | 57.20 |
| I vote to KEEP Māori wards | 6,950 | 42.80 |
| Total | 16,240 | 100.00 |
| Valid votes | 16,240 | 93.27 |
| Invalid votes | 1 | 0.01 |
| Blank votes | 1,170 | 6.72 |
| Total votes | 17,411 | 100.00 |
| Registered voters/turnout | 41,188 | 42.27 |
Source: electionz.com & MCERT

== Ōtorohanga District Council ==
2025 Ōtorohanga District Council election
- 11 October 2025
- Turnout: 3,168 (49.90% ▲4.74 pp)
- Mayor
| | Ind | Ind | Ind |
| Candidate | Rodney Dow | Cathy Prendergast | Jaimee Tamaki |
| Party | Independent | Independent | Independent |
| Popular vote | 2,011 | 605 | 523 |
| Percentage | 63.48% | 19.10% | 16.51% |
Mayor before election
Max Baxter
Independent
Elected mayor
Rodney Dow
Independent
- Councillors
- 9 seats on the governing body Ōtorohanga District Council; 6 seats needed for a majority
| Party | Seats | +/– |
|---|---|---|
| Independent | 9 | 0 |
This lists parties that won seats. See the complete results below.
| Control before | Control after |
|---|---|
| No majority | No majority |

=== 2025 Ōtorohanga mayoral election ===
2025 Ōtorohanga mayoral election
| Party | Candidate | Votes | % | ±% |
|---|---|---|---|---|
| Independent | Rodney Dow | 2,011 | 63.48 | (new) |
| Independent | Cathy Prendergast | 605 | 19.10 | (new) |
| Independent | Jaimee Tamaki | 523 | 16.51 | (new) |
| Informal votes | | 1 | 0.03 | +0.03 |
| Blank votes | | 28 | 0.88 | −0.52 |
| Turnout | | 3,168 | 49.90 | +4.74 |
| Registered electors | | 6,349 | | |
| Independent gain from Independent | | | | |

=== Kāwhia-Tihiroa general ward ===
2025 Kāwhia-Tihiroa general ward election
| Party | Candidate | Votes | % | ±% |
|---|---|---|---|---|
| Independent | Jo Butcher | elected unopposed | | |
| Independent | C.E. (Kit) Jeffries^{†} | elected unopposed | | |
| Registered electors | | 1,717 | | |
| Independent gain from Independent | | | | |
| Independent hold | | | | |
^{†} incumbent

=== Waipā general ward ===
2025 Waipā general ward election
| Party | Candidate | Votes | % | ±% |
|---|---|---|---|---|
| Independent | Michael Woodward | 212 | 50.72 | (new) |
| Independent | Steve Hughes | 197 | 47.13 | (new) |
| Informal votes | | 0 | 0.00 | +0.00 |
| Blank votes | | 9 | 2.15 | +1.10 |
| Turnout | | 418 | 57.03 | +6.43 |
| Registered electors | | 733 | | |
| Independent gain from Independent | | | | |

=== Kio Kio-Korakonui general ward ===
2025 Kio Kio-Korakonui general ward election
| Party | Candidate | Votes | % | ±% |
|---|---|---|---|---|
| Independent | Andrew Barker | elected unopposed | | |
| Registered electors | | 61 | | |
| Independent gain from Independent | | | | |

=== Ōtorohanga general ward ===
2025 Ōtorohanga general ward election
| Party | Candidate | Votes | % | ±% |
|---|---|---|---|---|
| Independent | Katrina Christison^{†} | 561 | 72.57 | +7.25 |
| Independent | Tayla Barclay | 483 | 62.48 | (new) |
| Independent | Robbie Neha | 184 | 23.80 | (new) |
| Informal votes | | 0 | 0.00 | +0.00 |
| Blank votes | | 30 | 3.88 | +2.00 |
| Turnout | | 773 | 50.99 | +2.11 |
| Registered electors | | 1,516 | | |
| Independent hold | | | | |
| Independent gain from Independent | | | | |
^{†} incumbent

=== Wharepūhunga general ward ===
2025 Wharepūhunga general ward election
| Party | Candidate | Votes | % | ±% |
|---|---|---|---|---|
| Independent | Shane Carr | elected unopposed | | |
| Registered electors | | 542 | | |
| Independent gain from Independent | | | | |

=== Rangiātea Māori ward ===
2025 Rangiātea Māori ward election
| Party | Candidate | Votes | % | ±% |
|---|---|---|---|---|
| Independent | Tennille Kete | 341 | 61.00 | (new) |
| Independent | Jaimee Tamaki^{†} | 327 | 58.50 | +11.00 |
| Independent | Wikitōria Tāne | 175 | 31.31 | +3.56 |
| Independent | Thomas Tai | 83 | 14.85 | (new) |
| Independent | Maxine Morgan-Wind | 43 | 7.69 | (new) |
| Informal votes | | 1 | 0.18 | −0.32 |
| Blank votes | | 8 | 1.43 | −1.57 |
| Turnout | | 559 | 51.76 | +10.14 |
| Registered electors | | 1,080 | | |
| Independent gain from Independent | | | | |
| Independent hold | | | | |
^{†} incumbent

=== Referendum on Māori wards ===
| Choice | Votes | % |
|---|---|---|
| I vote to REMOVE Māori wards | 1,531 | 52.06 |
| I vote to KEEP Māori wards | 1,410 | 47.94 |
| Total | 2,941 | 100.00 |
| Valid votes | 2,941 | 92.83 |
| Invalid votes | 0 | 0.00 |
| Blank votes | 227 | 7.17 |
| Total votes | 3,168 | 100.00 |
| Registered voters/turnout | 6,349 | 49.90 |
Source: electionz.com & MCERT

== South Waikato District Council ==
2025 South Waikato District Council election
- 11 October 2025
- Turnout: 7,596 (46.05% ▲2.89 pp)
- Mayor
| | Ind | Ind |
| Candidate | Gary Petley | Zed Latinovic |
| Party | Independent | Independent |
| Popular vote | 2,275 | 2,159 |
| Percentage | 29.95% | 28.42% |
| | Ind | Ind |
| Candidate | Sandra Wallace | Jeremy Hall |
| Party | Independent | Independent |
| Popular vote | 1,981 | 421 |
| Percentage | 26.08% | 5.54% |
Mayor before election
Gary Petley
Independent
Elected mayor
Gary Petley
Independent
- Councillors
- 10 seats on the governing body of South Waikato District Council; 5 seats needed for a majority
| Party | Seats | +/– |
|---|---|---|
| Independent | 10 | 0 |
This lists parties that won seats. See the complete results below.
| Control before | Control after |
|---|---|
| No majority | No majority |

=== 2025 South Waikato mayoral election ===
2025 South Waikato mayoral election
| Party | Candidate | Votes | % | ±% |
|---|---|---|---|---|
| Independent | Gary (Puku) Petley^{†} | 2,275 | 29.95 | −23.76 |
| Independent | Zed Latinovic | 2,159 | 28.42 | (new) |
| Independent | Sandra Wallace | 1,981 | 26.08 | (new) |
| Independent | Jeremy Hall | 421 | 5.54 | (new) |
| Independent | David Henry Barnes | 256 | 3.37 | (new) |
| Independent | Greg Marks | 255 | 3.36 | (new) |
| Independent | Joshua Michael Smith-Holley | 187 | 2.46 | (new) |
| Informal votes | | 8 | 0.11 | +0.05 |
| Blank votes | | 54 | 0.71 | −2.72 |
| Turnout | | 7,596 | 46.05 | +2.89 |
| Registered electors | | 16,495 | | |
| Independent hold | | | | |
^{†} incumbent

=== Tīrau ward ===
2025 Tīrau ward election
| Party | Candidate | Votes | % | ±% |
|---|---|---|---|---|
| Independent | Kerry Purdy^{†} | elected unopposed | | |
| Registered electors | | 1,646 | | |
| Independent hold | | | | |
^{†} incumbent

=== Putāruru ward ===
2025 Putāruru ward election
| Party | Candidate | Votes | % | ±% |
|---|---|---|---|---|
| Independent | Sandra Wallace^{†} | 1,491 | 59.31 | −9.82 |
| Independent | Dave Shaw | 1,222 | 48.61 | (new) |
| Independent | Zed Latinovic | 1,184 | 47.10 | (new) |
| Independent | Hans Nelis^{†} | 853 | 33.93 | −19.37 |
| Independent | Sapphire Marama | 809 | 32.18 | (new) |
| Independent | George Dixon | 677 | 26.93 | (new) |
| Independent | Danny Scott | 433 | 17.22 | (new) |
| Informal votes | | 1 | 0.04 | −0.05 |
| Blank votes | | 10 | 0.40 | −0.06 |
| Turnout | | 2,514 | 53.65 | +6.19 |
| Registered electors | | 4,686 | | |
| Independent hold | | | | |
| Independent gain from Independent | | | | |
| Independent gain from Independent | | | | |
^{†} incumbent

=== Tokoroa ward ===
2025 Tokoroa ward election
| Party | Candidate | Votes | % | ±% |
|---|---|---|---|---|
| Independent | Maria Te Kanawa^{†} | 2,290 | 52.79 | +5.75 |
| Independent | Michael Thomas | 2,023 | 46.63 | (new) |
| Independent | Ani Lipscombe (Ratu) | 2,021 | 46.59 | (new) |
| Independent | Elvisa Van Der Leden | 1,727 | 39.81 | (new) |
| Independent | Thomas Lee^{†} | 1,626 | 37.48 | −7.55 |
| Independent | Josiah Teokotai^{†} | 1,608 | 37.07 | −0.97 |
| Independent | Hamish Daine^{†} | 1,501 | 34.60 | −10.76 |
| Independent | Tony Herlihy | 1,474 | 33.98 | −0.67 |
| Independent | Bill Machen^{†} | 1,303 | 30.04 | −12.97 |
| Independent | Peter Schulte | 1,202 | 27.71 | (new) |
| Independent | Ray Adlam | 1,082 | 24.94 | (new) |
| Independent | Nick Portas | 1,075 | 24.78 | (new) |
| Independent | Gordon Wilson | 919 | 21.18 | (new) |
| Independent | David Henry Barnes | 917 | 21.14 | (new) |
| Independent | Joshua Michael Smith-Holley | 682 | 15.72 | (new) |
| Independent | Frank McIsaac | 523 | 12.06 | (new) |
| Informal votes | | 11 | 0.25 | +0.04 |
| Blank votes | | 17 | 0.39 | −0.58 |
| Turnout | | 4,338 | 42.68 | +0.46 |
| Registered electors | | 10,163 | | |
| Independent hold | | | | |
| Independent gain from Independent | | | | |
| Independent gain from Independent | | | | |
| Independent gain from Independent | | | | |
| Independent hold | | | | |
| Independent hold | | | | |
^{†} incumbent

== Waitomo District Council ==
2025 Waitomo District Council election
- 11 October 2025
- Turnout: 2,761 (46.15% ▲2.13 pp)
- Mayor
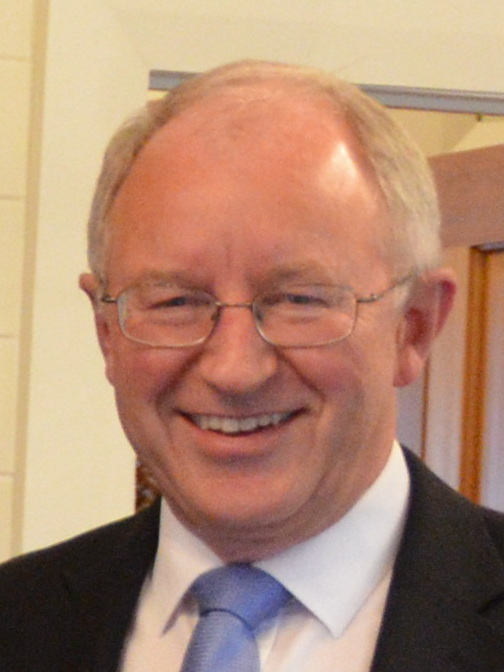
| | | Ind |
| Candidate | John Robertson | Janette Osborne |
| Party | Independent | Independent |
| Popular vote | 1,571 | 555 |
| Percentage | 56.90% | 20.10% |
| | Ind | Ind |
| Candidate | Natasha Willison-Reardon | Ross Richard |
| Party | Independent | Independent |
| Popular vote | 446 | 169 |
| Percentage | 16.15% | 6.12% |
Mayor before election
John Robertson
Independent
Elected mayor
John Robertson
Independent
- Councillors
- 6 seats on the governing body of Waitomo District Council; 4 seats needed for a majority
| Party | Seats | +/– |
|---|---|---|
| Independent | 6 | 0 |
This lists parties that won seats. See the complete results below.
| Control before | Control after |
|---|---|
| No majority | No majority |

=== 2025 Waitomo mayoral election ===
2025 Waitomo mayoral election
| Party | Candidate | Votes | % | ±% |
|---|---|---|---|---|
| Independent | John Robertson^{†} | 1,571 | 56.90 | +4.93 |
| Independent | Janette Osborne | 555 | 20.10 | (new) |
| Independent | Natasha Willison-Reardon | 446 | 16.15 | (new) |
| Independent | Richard Ross | 169 | 6.12 | (new) |
| Informal votes | | 1 | 0.04 | +0.00 |
| Blank votes | | 19 | 0.69 | −1.41 |
| Turnout | | 2,761 | 46.15 | +2.13 |
| Registered electors | | 5,983 | | |
| Independent hold | | | | |
^{†} incumbent

=== Waitomo Rural ward ===
2025 Waitomo Rural ward election
| Party | Candidate | Votes | % | ±% |
|---|---|---|---|---|
| Independent | Olivia Buckley | 875 | 57.91 | (new) |
| Independent | Allan Goddard^{†} | 754 | 49.90 | +3.30 |
| Independent | Janette Osborne^{†} | 694 | 45.93 | −14.67 |
| Independent | Gavin Todd^{†} | 679 | 44.94 | −3.66 |
| Independent | Natasha Willison-Reardon | 398 | 26.34 | (new) |
| Independent | Nichola Painter | 292 | 19.32 | (new) |
| Informal votes | | 2 | 0.13 | +0.13 |
| Blank votes | | 13 | 0.86 | −1.61 |
| Turnout | | 1,511 | 45.83 | −0.37 |
| Registered electors | | 3,297 | | |
| Independent gain from Independent | | | | |
| Independent hold | | | | |
| Independent hold | | | | |
^{†} incumbent

=== Te Kuiti ward ===
2025 Te Kuiti ward election
| Party | Candidate | Votes | % | ±% |
|---|---|---|---|---|
| Independent | Eady Tanirau Manawaiti^{†} | 639 | 51.12 | −5.86 |
| Independent | Dan Tasker^{†} | 561 | 44.88 | −12.36 |
| Independent | Isaiah Wallace | 515 | 41.20 | (new) |
| Independent | Ata Te Kanawa | 448 | 35.84 | (new) |
| Independent | Richard Ross | 368 | 29.44 | (new) |
| Independent | Ross O'Halloran | 363 | 29.04 | (new) |
| Independent | Faye Thomas | 348 | 27.84 | (new) |
| Informal votes | | 0 | 0.00 | +0.00 |
| Blank votes | | 24 | 1.92 | −0.82 |
| Turnout | | 1,250 | 46.54 | +5.02 |
| Registered electors | | 2,686 | | |
| Independent hold | | | | |
| Independent hold | | | | |
| Independent gain from Independent | | | | |
^{†} incumbent

== Taupō District Council ==
2025 Taupō District Council election
- 11 October 2025
- Turnout: 15,866 (56.13% ▲8.86 pp)
- Mayor
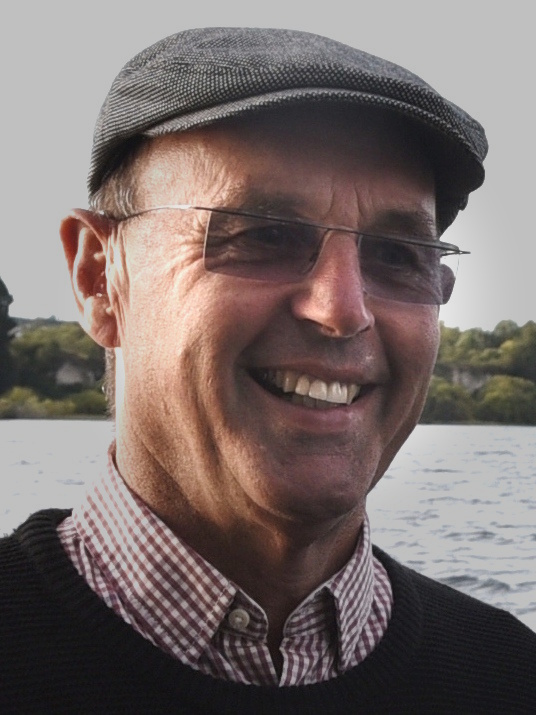
| | | Ind |
| Candidate | John Funnell | Zane Cozens |
| Party | Independent | Independent |
| Popular vote | 5,600 | 4,245 |
| Percentage | 35.30% | 26.75% |
| | Ind | Ind |
| Candidate | David Trewavas | Kevin Taylor |
| Party | Independent | Independent |
| Popular vote | 2,985 | 2,866 |
| Percentage | 18.81% | 18.06% |
Mayor before election
David Trewavas
Independent
Elected mayor
John Funnell
Independent
- Councillors
- 12 seats on the governing body Taupō District Council; 7 seats needed for a majority
| Party | Seats | +/– |
|---|---|---|
| Independent | 11 | −1 |
| Let's Go Taupō | 1 | +1 |
This lists parties that won seats. See the complete results below.
| Control before | Control after |
|---|---|
| No majority | No majority |

=== 2025 Taupō mayoral election ===
2025 Taupō mayoral election
| Party | Candidate | Votes | % | ±% |
|---|---|---|---|---|
| Independent | John Funnell | 5,600 | 35.30 | (new) |
| Independent | Zane Cozens | 4,245 | 26.76 | (new) |
| Independent | David James Trewavas^{†} | 2,985 | 18.81 | −32.50 |
| Independent | Kevin Taylor | 2,866 | 18.06 | (new) |
| Informal votes | | 6 | 0.04 | +0.02 |
| Blank votes | | 164 | 1.03 | −0.59 |
| Turnout | | 15,866 | 56.13 | +8.86 |
| Registered electors | | 28,269 | | |
| Independent gain from Independent | | | | |
^{†} incumbent

=== Mangakino-Pouakani general ward ===
2025 Mangakino-Pouakani general ward election
| Party | Candidate | Votes | % | ±% |
|---|---|---|---|---|
| Let's Go Taupō | Hope Woodward | 327 | 48.09 | (new) |
| Independent | Marlene Johnson | 320 | 47.06 | (new) |
| Informal votes | | 0 | 0.00 | n/a |
| Blank votes | | 33 | 4.85 | n/a |
| Turnout | | 680 | 50.90 | n/a |
| Registered electors | | 1,336 | | |
| Let's Go Taupō gain from Independent | | | | |

=== Taupō general ward ===
2025 Taupō general ward election
| Party | Candidate | Votes | % | ±% |
|---|---|---|---|---|
| Independent | Christine Rankin^{†} | 5,562 | 51.37 | −6.45 |
| Independent | Kevin Taylor^{†} | 5,398 | 49.86 | +0.14 |
| Independent | Rachel Shepherd^{†} | 5,233 | 48.33 | +10.40 |
| Independent | Yvonne Westerman^{†} | 5,031 | 46.47 | −9.15 |
| Independent | Duncan Campbell^{†} | 4,893 | 45.19 | +9.69 |
| Independent | Nicola De Lautour | 4,881 | 45.08 | (new) |
| Independent | Steve Manunui | 4,279 | 39.52 | (new) |
| Independent | Barry Owen Delany | 4,282 | 39.55 | (new) |
| Independent | Julie Yeoman | 4,115 | 38.01 | (new) |
| Independent | Belinda Walker | 3,935 | 36.34 | (new) |
| Let's Go Taupō | Ann Tweedie | 3,032 | 28.00 | (new) |
| Independent | Steve Punter | 2,810 | 25.95 | (new) |
| Independent | Bill Clarke | 2,671 | 24.67 | (new) |
| Independent | Richard Cade | 1,810 | 16.72 | (new) |
| Independent | David Freeman | 1,357 | 12.53 | −9.88 |
| Independent | Mark Wynyard | 734 | 6.78 | (new) |
| Independent | Katrin Wilson | 434 | 4.01 | (new) |
| Informal votes | | 28 | 0.26 | −0.08 |
| Blank votes | | 132 | 1.22 | −0.27 |
| Turnout | | 10,827 | 58.54 | +5.85 |
| Registered electors | | 18,496 | | |
| Independent hold | | | | |
| Independent hold | | | | |
| Independent hold | | | | |
| Independent hold | | | | |
| Independent hold | | | | |
| Independent gain from Independent | | | | |
| Independent gain from Independent | | | | |
^{†} incumbent

=== Tūrangi-Tongariro general ward ===
2025 Tūrangi-Tongariro general ward election
| Party | Candidate | Votes | % | ±% |
|---|---|---|---|---|
| Independent | Sandra Greenslade^{†} | 959 | 57.84 | +17.37 |
| Independent | Alan Rafferty (Raff) | 505 | 30.46 | (new) |
| Independent | David Livingstone | 151 | 9.11 | (new) |
| Informal votes | | 6 | 0.36 | −0.27 |
| Blank votes | | 37 | 2.23 | −0.19 |
| Turnout | | 1,658 | 65.90 | +14.43 |
| Registered electors | | 2,516 | | |
| Independent hold | | | | |
^{†} incumbent

=== Taupō East Rural general ward ===
2025 Taupō East Rural general ward election
| Party | Candidate | Votes | % | ±% |
|---|---|---|---|---|
| Independent | Kylie Leonard^{†} | 501 | 57.45 | n/a |
| Let's Go Taupō | Rebecca Stafford | 316 | 36.24 | (new) |
| Informal votes | | 0 | 0.00 | n/a |
| Blank votes | | 55 | 6.31 | n/a |
| Turnout | | 872 | 51.87 | n/a |
| Registered electors | | 1,681 | | |
| Independent hold | | | | |
^{†} incumbent

=== Te Papamārearea Māori ward ===
2025 Te Papamārearea Māori ward election
| Party | Candidate | Votes | % | ±% |
|---|---|---|---|---|
| Independent | Wahine Murch | 1,150 | 62.88 | (new) |
| Independent | Ngāhuia Foreman (née Asher) | 881 | 48.17 | (new) |
| Independent | Danny Aperahama Loughlin^{†} | 866 | 47.35 | n/a |
| Informal votes | | 0 | 0.00 | n/a |
| Blank votes | | 37 | 2.02 | n/a |
| Turnout | | 1,829 | 43.14 | n/a |
| Registered electors | | 4,240 | | |
| Independent gain from Independent | | | | |
| Independent gain from Independent | | | | |
^{†} incumbent

=== Referendum on Māori wards ===
| Choice | Votes | % |
|---|---|---|
| I vote to REMOVE Māori wards | 9,047 | 59.89 |
| I vote to KEEP Māori wards | 6,058 | 40.11 |
| Total | 15,105 | 100.00 |
| Valid votes | 15,105 | 95.20 |
| Invalid votes | 2 | 0.01 |
| Blank votes | 759 | 4.78 |
| Total votes | 15,866 | 100.00 |
| Registered voters/turnout | 28,269 | 56.13 |
Source: electionz.com & MCERT

== See also ==
- 2025 Waikato Regional Council election
