= Te Miro =

- Village
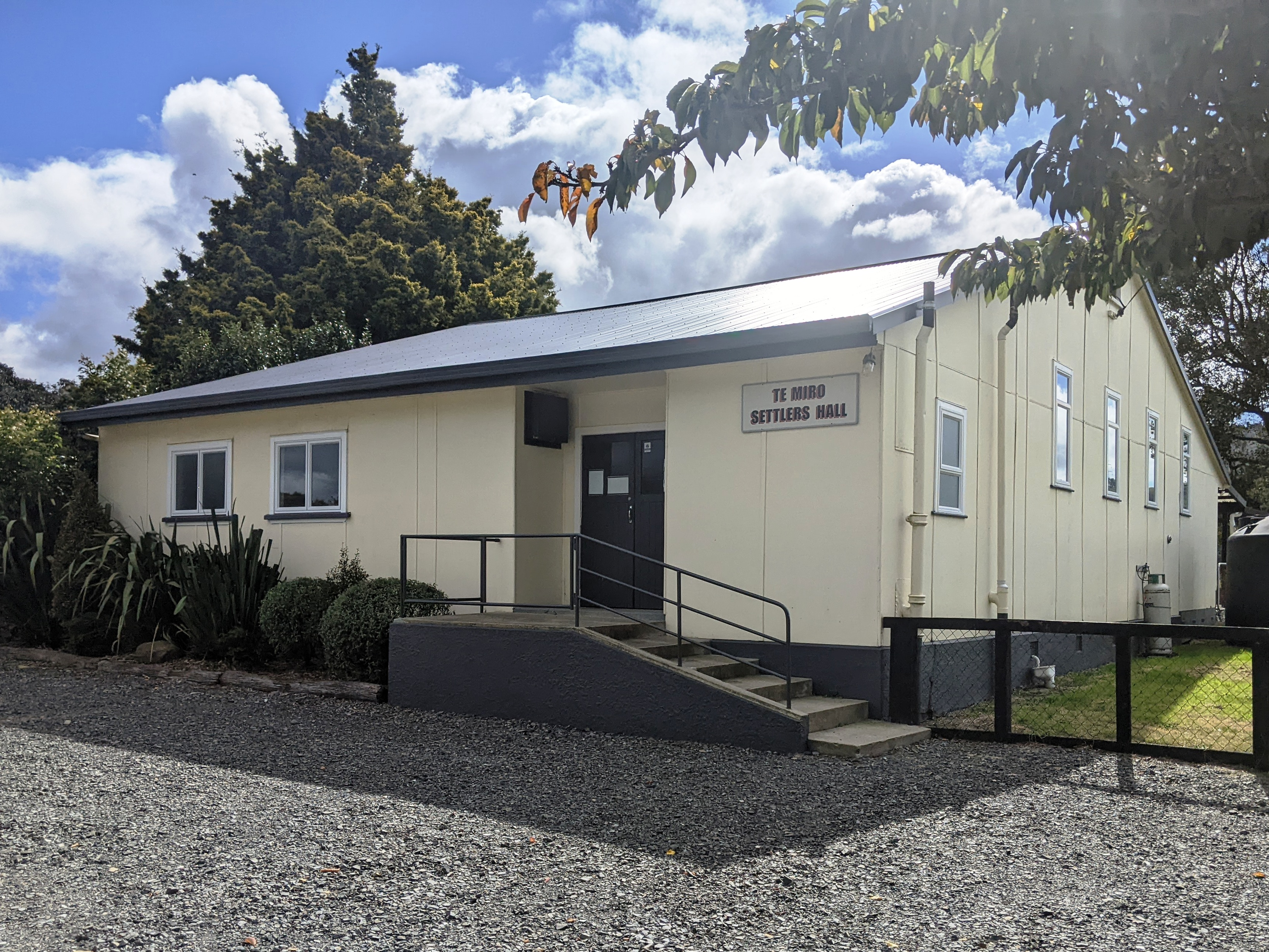
- Te Miro Settlers Hall
- Interactive map of Te Miro
- Coordinates: 37°48′27″S 175°32′44″E
- Country: New Zealand
- Region: Waikato
- Territorial authority: Waipā District
- Ward: Maungatautari General Ward
- Community: Cambridge Community
- Electorates: Waikato; Hauraki-Waikato (Māori)

Government
  - Territorial Authority: Waipā District Council
  - Regional council: Waikato Regional Council
  - Mayor of Waipa: Mike Pettit
  - Waikato MP: Tim van de Molen
  - Hauraki-Waikato MP: Hana-Rawhiti Maipi-Clarke

Area
  - Total: 67.11 km^{2} (25.91 sq mi)

Population (2023 Census)
  - Total: 690
  - Density: 10/km^{2} (27/sq mi)
- Postcode: 3496

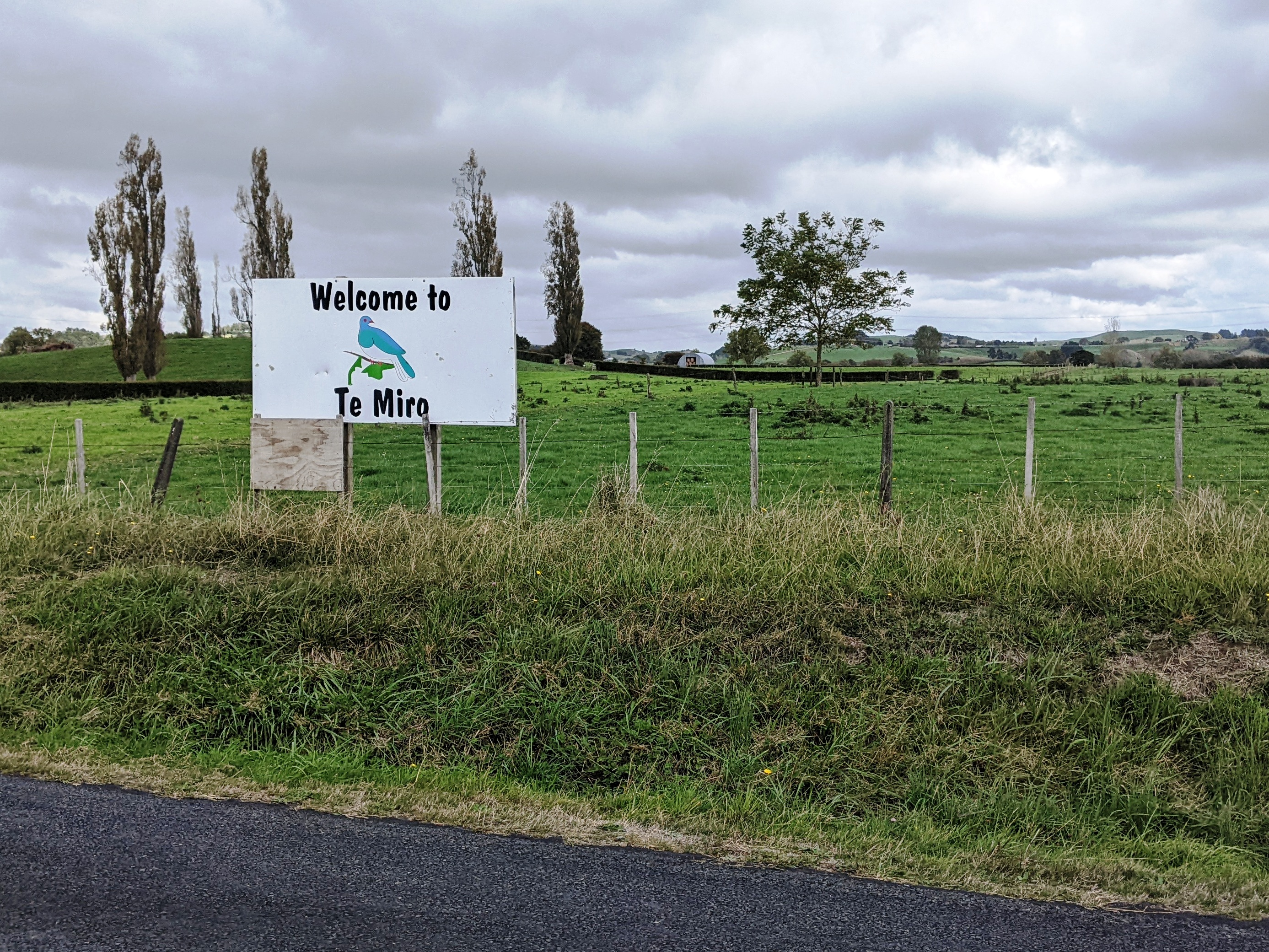
Te Miro welcome sign

Te Miro is an area in the Waipā District of the Waikato Region of the North Island of New Zealand. Te Miro is situated 31 kilometres east southeast of Hamilton, and 24 kilometres northeast of Cambridge.

== History ==
The name Te Miro for the area first became used in 1916, when it was surveyed and developed for European settlement. Translations of the Maori word miro are a twist, or alternatively a torrent of water, which may have originated from the many streams that twist through the hills of the area.

The arrival of the first missionaries in New Zealand in 1814 eventually led to European settlers arriving in the Waikato. In the 1850s missionaries and farmers from Britain settled in the Te Miro area and introduced modern farming practices to local Maori, helping them set up two flour mills and importing grinding wheels from England and France. During this time, wheat was a profitable crop, but when merchants in Auckland began purchasing cheaper grain from Australia the market went into decline. In 1868, Daniel Thornton was the first settler to buy land near Te Miro, and around 1894, his widow established a large residence at what is now known as Sanatorium Hill.

In 1916, the government purchased most of the 12,000 acre farm of James Taylor, which was surveyed, named the Te Miro Settlement, and opened up to settlement after the First World War. 72 newly surveyed sections, ranging in size from 1 to 323 acres, were balloted to returning servicemen. The new settlement initially used Maungakawa Road (south of the village and formerly called Taylor Road) to access Cambridge via Sanitorium Hill, but eventually Te Miro Road (west of the village, and formerly known as Valley Road) was linked at the bottom of the hill to Flume Road, and that route has now become the main access road. The focal village of Te Miro (37 48 35; 175 32 50) township was surveyed at the intersection of present day Te Miro and upper Maungakawa roads, with an initial 20 small lots and a designated school reserve site. A school was built on the designated school reserve in 1920, and a post office started operating out of a back room in a local residence in 1921. The first industry was a Rimu sawmill, located in the bush above the school, which was supported by a bush tramway. A community hall was built in 1956. Much of the original balloted farmland required scrub clearing, and for the new settlers, there was little financial support from the government for the settlers. A plague of rabbits, and the depression of 1921 caused many of the initial soldier-settlers to abandon their allotments. However, some persisted, and established farms which have survived and prospered, and passed down through the generations.

In 2020, Te Miro celebrated its centennial, and a history of the school and district was published. It is presently a community of approximately 280 properties, made up of several dozen dairy and drystock farms over 50 acres in size, around 40 lifestyle blocks of between 2 and 50 acres, and the balance residences on less than 2 acres.

== Demographics ==
Te Miro locality covers 67.11 km^{2} (25.91 sq mi). It is part of the larger Karapiro statistical area.

Historical population
Year	Pop.	±% p.a.
2006	411	—
2013	570	+4.78%
2018	627	+1.92%
2023	690	+1.93%
The 2006 population is for a smaller area of 47.81 km^{2}. Source:

Te Miro had a population of 690 in the 2023 New Zealand census, an increase of 63 people (10.0%) since the 2018 census, and an increase of 120 people (21.1%) since the 2013 census. There were 348 males and 345 females in 243 dwellings. 2.2% of people identified as LGBTIQ+. There were 144 people (20.9%) aged under 15 years, 93 (13.5%) aged 15 to 29, 366 (53.0%) aged 30 to 64, and 78 (11.3%) aged 65 or older.

People could identify as more than one ethnicity. The results were 96.5% European (Pākehā), 6.5% Māori, 0.9% Pasifika, 2.6% Asian, and 3.5% other, which includes people giving their ethnicity as "New Zealander". English was spoken by 97.8%, Māori by 0.4%, and other languages by 9.1%. No language could be spoken by 2.2% (e.g. too young to talk). New Zealand Sign Language was known by 0.4%. The percentage of people born overseas was 21.7, compared with 28.8% nationally.

Religious affiliations were 25.7% Christian, 0.4% Hindu, 0.9% New Age, and 0.9% other religions. People who answered that they had no religion were 67.4%, and 5.7% of people did not answer the census question.

Of those at least 15 years old, 165 (30.2%) people had a bachelor's or higher degree, 288 (52.7%) had a post-high school certificate or diploma, and 96 (17.6%) people exclusively held high school qualifications. 117 people (21.4%) earned over $100,000 compared to 12.1% nationally. The employment status of those at least 15 was 318 (58.2%) full-time, 87 (15.9%) part-time, and 6 (1.1%) unemployed.

== Geography ==
The most visible point in the Te Miro district is the extinct volcanic cone known as Ruru (37 47 45; 175 34 50), which is 482 metres high. A 59-metre telecommunications tower is situated on the top of Ruru. From Ruru, two other extinct volcanic cones, Maungakawa (496 metres) (37 48 50; 175 36 40), and Te Tapui (495 metres) (37 50 30; 175 34 50) extend in a south easterly direction for approximately 10 kilometres. The contour of the district is gently rolling hills, from 40 to 496 metres above sea level. Land use is mainly pastoral and dairy farming, some areas of native bush and reserves, and some small blocks of Radiata pine forestry plantations. There is negligible industrial or commercial land use.

== Geology ==
There are three main rock types in the Te Miro area, which are Greywacke (sediments deposited on the ocean floor about 140 million years ago); Andesite (lava flow from volcanic cones such as Mt Ruru, which erupted 6.2 million years ago); and Ignimbrite (consolidated volcanic ash from the Mangakino caldera complex, from about 1 million years ago). The soil on top of the rock is largely yellow brown earth, a clay rich soil with coverings of volcanic ash. The bush regions are rich in fertile black loam.

== Governance ==
Te Miro is administered by the Waipā District Council, which has its seat at Te Awamutu. Te Miro is part of the Waikato general parliamentary electorate and the Hauraki-Waikato Māori electorate.

== Economy ==
Te Miro's main sources of local employment and income today come from dairy and drystock farming. Most other residents commute to jobs in Cambridge and Hamilton.

== Transport ==
The main access to Te Miro is from Te Miro Road, which provides access through Cambridge to the Waikato Expressway, a 4 lane motorway to Auckland. State Highway 1 south of Cambridge connects to Tauranga, Rotorua and Taupō in the southeast. Hamilton Airport, 25 minutes drive from Te Miro, is the nearest airport and provides daily flights to all New Zealand's main centres. Auckland International Airport is about a 2-hour drive from Te Miro.

== Media ==
Cambridge has two local newspapers, the Cambridge News and the Cambridge Edition. There is a Facebook page that is used to share and request information and resources.

== Sport ==
Te Miro is the home of the Te Miro Mountain Bike Park which provides 7 kilometres of mountain bike and jogging trails of various levels of difficulty.

== Education ==
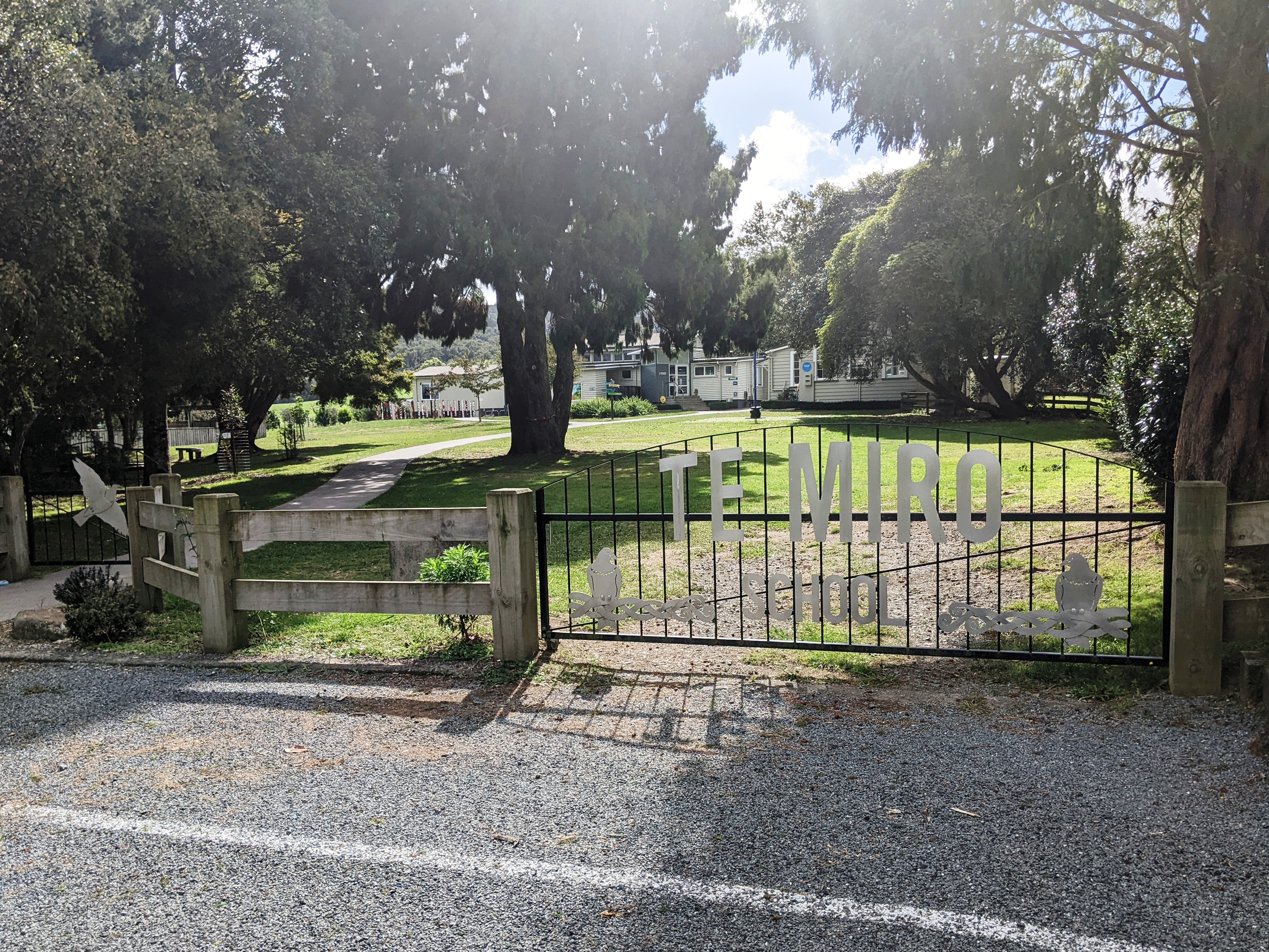
Te Miro School

Te Miro School is a co-educational state primary school located in Te Miro Village.

The school was built in 1920. It currently has three classes: a junior class (years 0–2 named "Rata"), an intermediate class (years 3-4 named "Kowhai") and a senior class (years 5–8 named "Rimu"). The combined roll is 57 as of July 2026.

Two secondary schools are located in Cambridge, serviced by school buses from Te Miro.

The University of Waikato and Wintec are major tertiary institutions in nearby Hamilton.

== Notable residents ==
Past or present residents include:

- Wiremu Tamihana, Ngati Haua chief
- King Tawhiao, Waikato King Movement
- Dick Tonks, Olympic medalist rower, Olympic rowing coach
- Sarah Cowley, Track and field athlete, TV presenter
