= 2025 Hauraki District Council election =

- 11 October 2025
- Turnout: 6,120 (40.24% ▼0.32 pp)
- Mayor
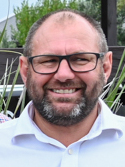
		Ind	Ind
Candidate	Toby Adams	Roman Jackson	Levi Burton
Party	Independent	Independent	Independent
Popular vote	4,781	629	482
Percentage	78.12%	10.28%	7.88%
Mayor before election
Toby Adams
Independent
Elected mayor
Toby Adams
Independent
- Councillors
- 13 seats on the governing body of Hauraki District Council; 7 seats needed for a majority
Party	Seats	+/–
Independent	13	0
This lists parties that won seats. See the complete results below.

The 2025 Hauraki District Council election was a local election held from 9 September to 11 October in the Hauraki District of New Zealand, as part of that year's territorial authority elections and other local elections held nation-wide.

Voters elected the mayor of Hauraki and 13 district councillors for the 2025–2028 term of the Hauraki District Council. Postal voting and the first-past-the-post voting system were used.

Incumbent mayor Toby Adams won re-election to a third term.

In the prior term, the council voted to introduce a Māori ward for the term following this election; in a referendum on its future held at this election (as part of a nation-wide series of referendums) voters elected to remove the Māori ward.

== Key dates ==
- 4 July 2025: Nominations for candidates opened
- 1 August 2025: Nominations for candidates closed at 12 pm
- 9 September 2025: Voting documents were posted and voting opened
- 11 October 2025: Voting closed at 12 pm and progress/preliminary results were published
- 16–19 October 2025: Final results were declared.

== Background ==
=== Positions up for election ===
Voters in the district elected 13 councillors across 4 wards, and also the mayor of Hauraki. They also elected members of the Waikato Regional Council. (Note: 2 members partially elected from the district in the Waihou general constituency.; 1 member partially elected from the district in the Thames-Coromandel general constituency.; 1 member partially elected from the district in the Ngā Tai ki Uta Māori constituency.)

== List of candidates ==
=== Incumbents not seeking re-election ===
- Phillip Buckthought, incumbent councillor for the Plains ward
- Carole Daley, incumbent councillor for the Paeroa ward
- Sarah Holmes, incumbent councillor for the Waihī ward
- Josh Martyn, incumbent councillor for the Waihī ward
- Bhavesh Ranchhod, incumbent councillor for the Waihī ward

=== Mayor ===
The incumbent Mayor of Hauraki, Toby Adams, who was first elected in 2019, sought re-election in 2025.

Candidate	Photo	Affiliation (Note: A candidate may leave their affiliation blank, run as an independent, or run with an affiliation to an organisation, local body ticket or political party. Hauraki District Council does not allow whānau, hapū, or iwi details to be used for the affiliation.)	Notes
Toby Adams		None	Incumbent mayor since 2019
Levi Burton		Independent	Also ran to be a councillor in the Waihi general ward
Roman Jackson		None	Also ran to be a councillor in the Waihi general ward

=== Councillors ===
==== Plains ward ====
The Plains ward returned four councillors to the district council.

Candidate	Affiliation	Notes
Cynthia Bates	Independent	
Ray Broad	None	Incumbent councillor
Stephen Crooymans	None	Incumbent councillor
Neil Gray	None	Incumbent councillor
Andrew Pickford	ACT Local	Former international airline captain

==== Paeroa ward ====
The Paeroa ward returned three councillors to the district council.

Candidate	Affiliation	Notes
Grant Aitken	None	Former Paeroa College Principal
Michelle Magnus	ACT Local	Caregiver and business executive
Paul Milner	None	Incumbent councillor
Jo Tilsley	None	Incumbent councillor
Rino Lee Wilkinson	None	Incumbent councillor

==== Waihi ward ====
The Waihi ward returned four councillors to the district council.

Candidate	Affiliation	Notes
Levi Burton	None	Also ran for mayor
Sara Howell	None	Previously ran for council in 2022
Roman Jackson	None	Also ran for mayor
Austin Rattray	Independent	Incumbent councillor
Amanda May Ryan	None	Previously ran for council in 2022
Stuie Thompson	Independent	
Anne Marie Spicer	Independent	Incumbent councillor

==== Te Pakikau o te Ika Māori ward ====
Te Pakikau o te Ika Māori ward returned two councillors to the district council.

Candidate	Affiliation	Notes
Rereahu Collier	Independent	
Desmond Tyler	None	

== Results ==
=== Mayor ===
2025 Hauraki mayoral election
Party	Candidate	Votes	%	±%
Independent	Toby Adams^{†}	4,781	78.12	n/a
Independent	Roman Jackson	629	10.28	(new)
Independent	Levi Burton	482	7.88	(new)
Informal votes		18	0.29	n/a
Blank votes		210	3.43	n/a
Turnout		6,120	40.24	n/a
Registered electors		15,210		
Independent hold				
^{†} incumbent

=== Council ===
==== Paeroa general ward ====
2025 Paeroa general ward election
Party	Candidate	Votes	%	±%
Independent	Paul Armstrong Milner^{†}	1,184	63.05	−9.89
Independent	Rino Lee Wilkinson^{†}	1,103	58.73	−12.01
Independent	Jo Tilsley^{†}	1,097	58.41	−7.12
Independent	Grant Michael Aitken	998	53.14	(new)
ACT Local	Michelle Elizabeth Magnus	616	32.80	(new)
Informal votes		4	0.21	+0.11
Blank votes		28	1.49	+1.09
Turnout		1,878	45.64	+4.30
Registered electors		4,115		
Independent hold				
Independent hold				
Independent hold				
^{†} incumbent

==== Plains general ward ====
2025 Plains general ward election
Party	Candidate	Votes	%	±%
Independent	Neil Gray^{†}	1,366	79.37	+9.15
Independent	Stephen Crooymans^{†}	1,262	73.33	+23.94
Independent	Ray Broad^{†}	1,233	71.64	+6.70
Independent	Cynthia Bates	772	44.86	(new)
ACT Local	Andrew Pickford	640	37.19	(new)
Informal votes		2	0.12	+0.12
Blank votes		16	0.93	+0.50
Turnout		1,721	42.12	+0.99
Registered electors		4,086		
Independent hold				
Independent hold				
Independent hold				
Independent gain from Independent				
^{†} incumbent

==== Waihī general ward ====
2025 Waihī general ward election
Party	Candidate	Votes	%	±%
Independent	Anne Marie Spicer^{†}	1,663	79.42	+10.42
Independent	Austin Rattray^{†}	1,305	62.32	+5.74
Independent	Amanda May Ryan	1,284	61.32	+28.23
Independent	Sara Howell	1,216	58.07	+18.10
Independent	Stuie Thompson	685	32.71	(new)
Independent	Roman Jackson	483	23.07	(new)
Independent	Levi Burton	349	16.67	(new)
Informal votes		3	0.14	+0.01
Blank votes		21	1.00	+0.62
Turnout		2,094	38.87	−0.61
Registered electors		5,387		
Independent hold				
Independent hold				
Independent gain from Independent				
Independent gain from Independent				
^{†} incumbent

==== Te Pakikau o te Ika Māori ward ====
2025 Te Pakikau o te Ika Māori Ward election
Party	Candidate	Votes	%	±%
Independent	Rereahu Collie	elected unopposed		
Independent	Desmond Tyler	elected unopposed		
Registered electors		1,622		
Independent win (new seat)				
Independent win (new seat)				

=== Māori wards poll ===
Choice	Votes	%
I vote to keep the Māori ward	2,392	42.09
I vote to remove the Māori ward	3,291	57.91
Total	5,683	100.00
Valid votes	5,683	92.86
Invalid/blank votes	437	7.14
Total votes	6,120	100.00

== See also ==
- 2025 Hamilton City Council election
