= Hauraki District Council =

Territorial authority in New Zealand

Coordinates: 37.3339864°S 175.5257313°E

Type
- Term limits: None

History
- Founded: 6 March 1989

Leadership
- Mayor: Toby Adams
- Deputy mayor: Paul Milner
- CEO: David Speirs

Structure
- Seats: 14 seats (1 mayor, 13 ward seats)
- Political groups: Independent (14)
- Length of term: 3 years

Elections
- Last election: 2025
- Next election: 2028

Website
- hauraki-dc.govt.nz

Hauraki District Council is the territorial authority for the Hauraki District of New Zealand's North Island. It serves as the district's local government, with the Waikato Regional Council serving as the regional authority. It has existed since the 1989 reforms to local government.

The council has 13 councillors and is chaired by the mayor of Hauraki (currently Toby Adams since 2019).

In 2026 15,324 were registered to vote in the District.

== Composition ==
The council currently consists of a mayor elected at-large and 13 councillors, elected from four wards. Two councillors are returned from Te Pakikau o te Ika Māori ward, which covers the entire district, four from Plains general ward, three from Paeroa general ward, and four from Waihī general ward.

The current mayor is Toby Adams. Adams was re-elected unopposed in 2022 for a further three-year term. He was re-elected again in 2025 by a substantial majority.

=== Current council ===
The present council was elected in the 2025 local elections:

Hauraki District Council, 2025–2028
Position	Name	Ward	Affiliation
Mayor	Toby Adams	At-large	Independent
Deputy mayor	Paul Milner	Paeroa	Independent
Councillor	Jo Tilsley	Paeroa	Independent
Councillor	Rino Wilkinson	Paeroa	Independent
Councillor	Cynthia Bates	Plains	Independent
Councillor	Ray Broad	Plains	Independent
Councillor	Stephen Crooymans	Plains	Independent
Councillor	Neil Gray	Plains	Independent
Councillor	Sara Howell	Waihī	Independent
Councillor	Austin Rattray	Waihī	Independent
Councillor	Amanda Ryan	Waihī	Independent
Councillor	Anne Marie Spicer	Waihī	Independent
Councillor	Rereahu Collier	Te Pakikau o te Ika	Independent
Councillor	Des Tyler	Te Pakikau o te Ika	Independent

== History ==
The council was established in 1989 from the merger of Waihi Borough Council (established in 1902), Paeroa Borough Council (established in 1915), and Hauraki Plains County Council (established in 1920).

== Elections ==
- 1989
- 1992
- 1995
- 1998
- 2001
- 2004
- 2007
- 2010
- 2013
- 2016
- 2019
- 2022
- 2025
