= Susan O'Regan =

New Zealand politician (born 1972)

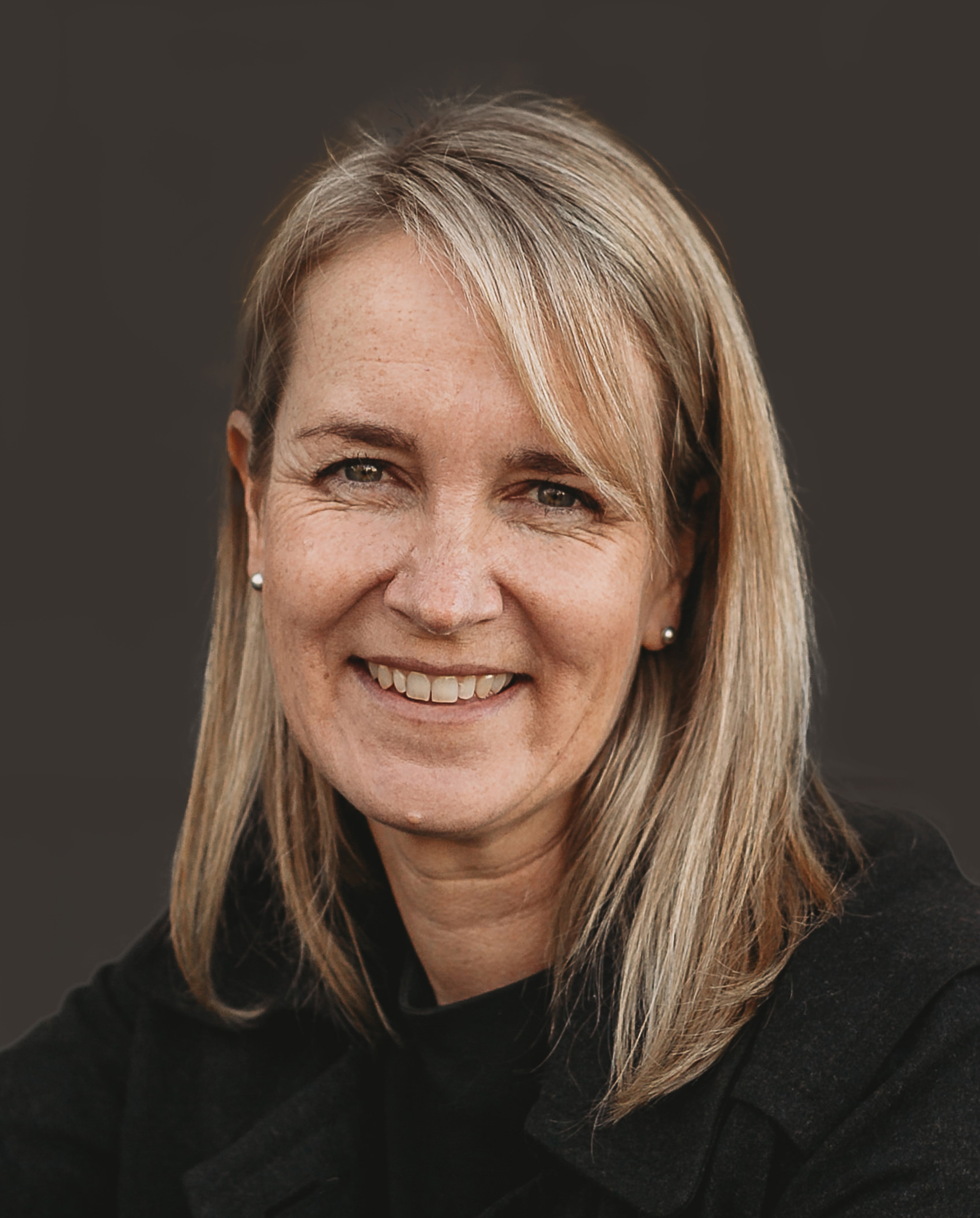

5th Mayor of Waipa
- In office 2022–2025
- Preceded by: Jim Mylchreest
- Succeeded by: Mike Pettit

Personal details
- Born: Susan Catherine O'Regan; 26 April 1972 Rukuhia, New Zealand
- Party: National
- Spouse: John Hayward
- Parent(s): Katherine O'Regan; Neil O'Regan
- Education: University of Otago

Susan Catherine O'Regan (born 1972) is a New Zealand politician who served as the mayor of Waipa from 2022 to 2025.

== Early life ==
O'Regan was born and raised in Rukuhia. Her mother was Katherine O'Regan, a National MP who represented Waipa. She boarded at Waikato Diocesan School in Hamilton and King's College in Auckland, and later graduated from the University of Otago with a Bachelor of Laws and Bachelor of Arts. She briefly worked for Murray McCully as a ministerial assistant in parliament before starting a legal career in Auckland, being admitted to the bar in 1996. After marrying a farmer, she ended her legal career in 2010 to focus on family and farming. Their farm, Judge Valley Dairies, has won multiple awards at the Waikato Farm Environment Awards.

== Political career ==
O'Regan was asked to run for the Taranaki-King Country electorate in the 2014 election after Shane Ardern announced his retirement, but she turned it down after becoming pregnant. In 2016, she was elected to the Kakepuku ward of the Waipa District Council. She was re-elected unopposed in 2019 and chaired the council's Strategic Planning and Policy Committee.

In April 2022, O'Regan announced that despite speculation that she would run for mayor like her mother had in 1995, she was retiring from politics to work for DairyNZ. She also ruled out contesting the parliamentary by-election for Tauranga, an electorate her mother had unsuccessfully run for twice after her own Waipa seat was abolished. However, in June she changed her mind, staking her political career on an "all or nothing" campaign for mayor. In October, she defeated the incumbent Jim Mylchreest, becoming the first female mayor of the district and the first to oust an incumbent.

In 2025 O'Regan became the second incumbent mayor to be ousted, being defeated by Mike Pettit.
