= Mayor of Hauraki =

Head of the municipal government of Hauraki District, New Zealand

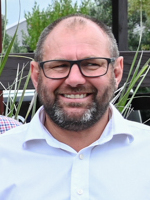
- Incumbent; Toby Adams since 2019
- Style: His/Her Worship
- Seat: Paeroa
- Term length: 3 years, renewable
- Formation: 1989
- First holder: Basil Morrison
- Deputy: Paul Milner
- Salary: $128,976
- Website: Official website

The mayor of Hauraki is the elected head of local government in the Hauraki District of New Zealand's North Island; one of 67 mayors in the country. The largest town in the district is Waihi and the council is based in Paeroa. The mayor presides over the Hauraki District Council and is directly elected using the first-past-the-post method.

The current mayor is Toby Adams, first elected in October 2019 during that year's local elections. He was re-elected in 2022.

== List of mayors ==
	Name	Portrait	Term	Affiliation
1	Basil Morrison		1989–2004	Independent
2	John Tregidga		2004–2019	Independent
3	Toby Adams		2019–present	Independent
